= List of sports =

The following is a list of sports and games, divided by category. According to the World Sports Encyclopaedia (2003), there are 8,000 known indigenous sports and sporting games. A sport is a physical activity or game, often competitive and organised, that maintains or improves physical ability and skills. Sport may provide enjoyment to participants and entertainment to spectators. The number of participants in a particular sport can vary from hundreds of people to a single individual. A game is an activity defined by a challenge and a set of rules, typically done for enjoyment, competition, or development. Games may be played informally or in professional competitive settings before audiences. Popular formats include board games, card games, video games, and sports, distinguished from unstructured play by having rules. Scholars have long debated the essence of games, with no single definition achieving universal acceptance.

== Acrobatic arts ==
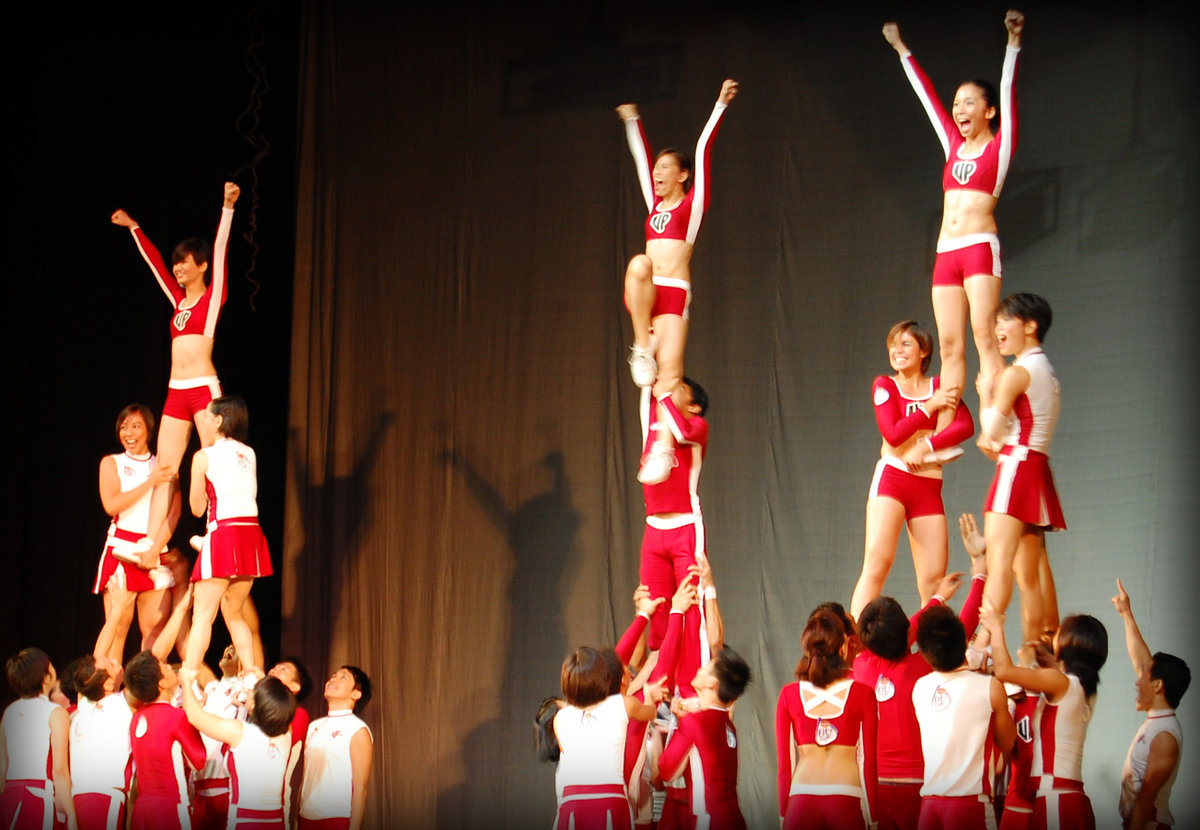
Cheerleading

- Acrobatics
  - Acrobalance
    - Adagio
  - Acro dance
  - Acroyoga
- Artistic cycling
- Color guard (flag spinning)
- Dancing
  - Dancesport
    - Ballroom dancing
      - Standard
      - Latin
      - Salsa
    - Breakdancing
    - Acrobatic rock and roll
    - Wheelchair dancesport
  - Dragon dance and Lion dance
  - Gloving
- Cheerleading
- Figure skating
- High kick
- Motorcycle stunt riding
- Paragliding
- Pole sports
  - Pole dance
- Quadrobics
- Slackwire
- Slacklining
- Tightrope walking
- Trampolining

=== Parkour/Freerunning ===
Sport Parkour and Freerunning are empirically measured competitions of skill, speed or style on an obstacle based course. Self expression, demonstration of control and power are measured.

- Freerunning
- Martial Arts Tricking
- Ninja Warrior
- Obstacle racing (OCR)
- Parkour
- World Chase Tag

== Air sports ==
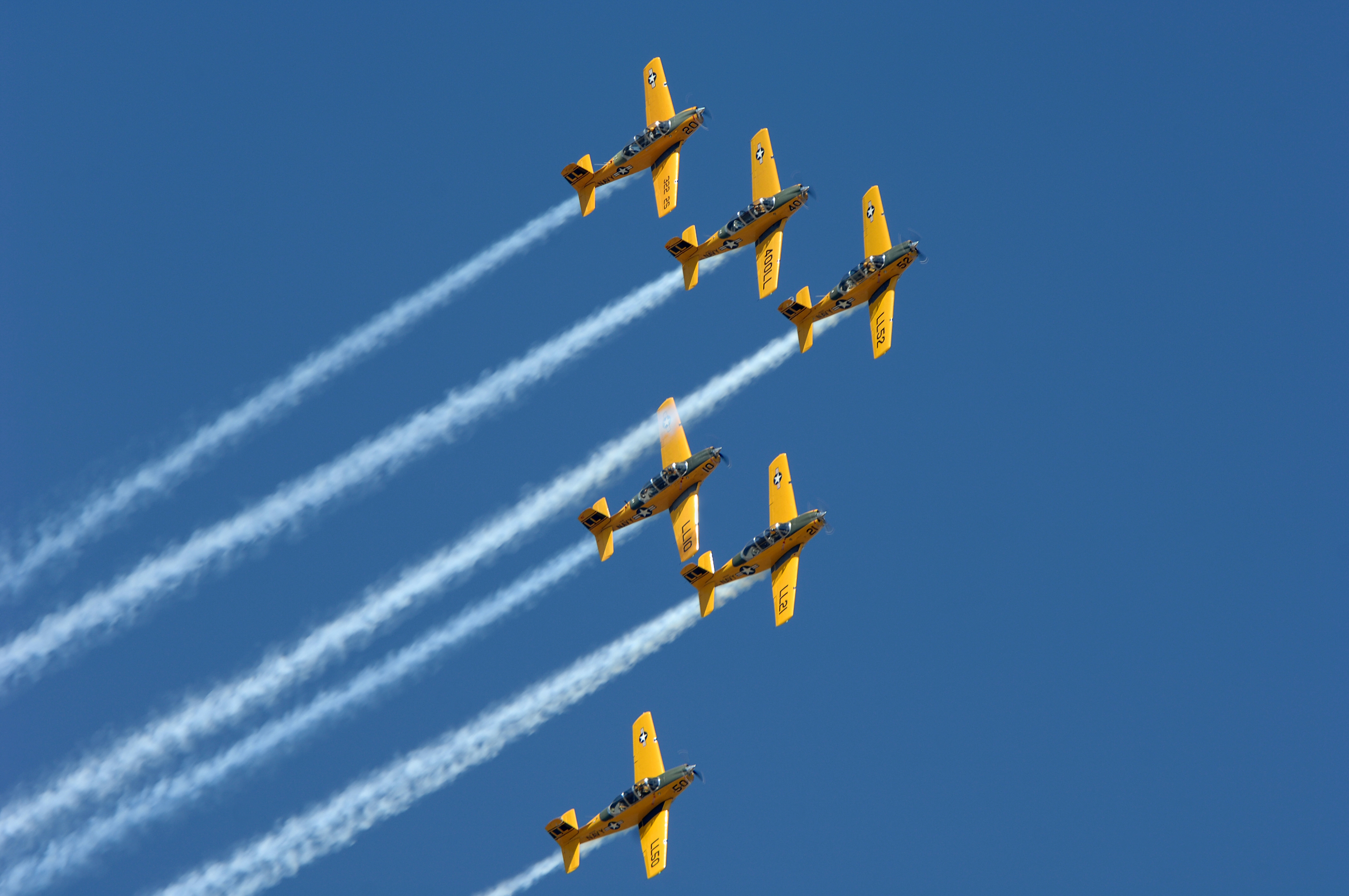
Lima Lima aerobatics team performing over Louisville.

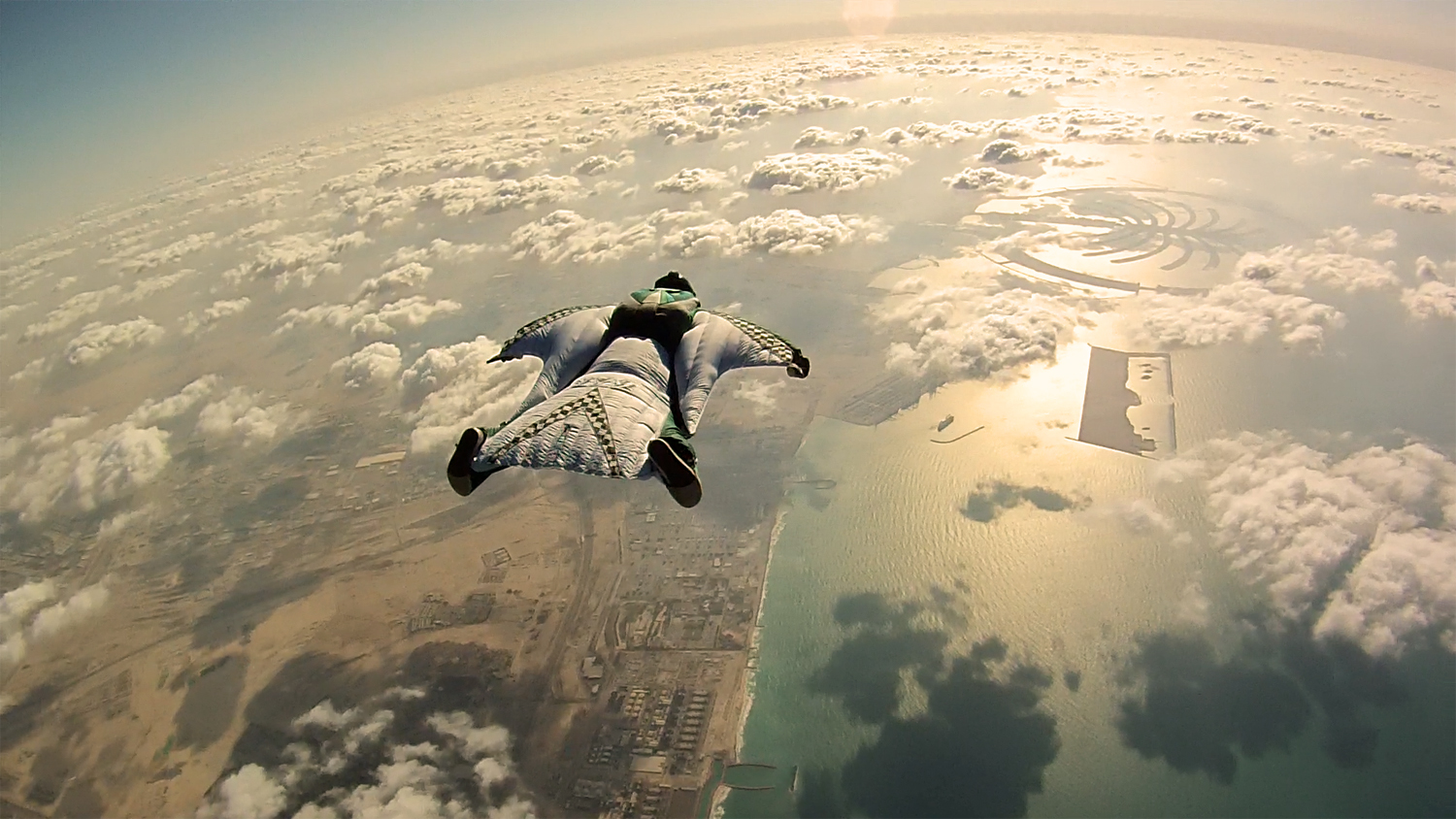
Wingsuit flying

- Aerobatics
  - 3D Aerobatics
  - Competition aerobatics
- Air racing
  - Drone racing
  - Airspeeder
  - Formula One Air Racing
  - Formula V Air Racing
  - Red Bull Air Race World Championship
  - Hot air ballooning
    - Cluster ballooning
    - Hopper ballooning
- Gliding
- Hang gliding
  - Powered hang glider
- Human-powered aircraft
- Kiteboarding
- Model aircraft
- Parachuting
  - BASE jumping
  - Canopy piloting
  - Skysurfing
  - Wingsuit flying
    - Airplane wingsuit formation
  - Bodyflight (indoor skydiving)
- Paragliding
  - Powered paragliding (paramotoring)
- Ultralight aviation

== Animal sports ==
=== Bovines ===
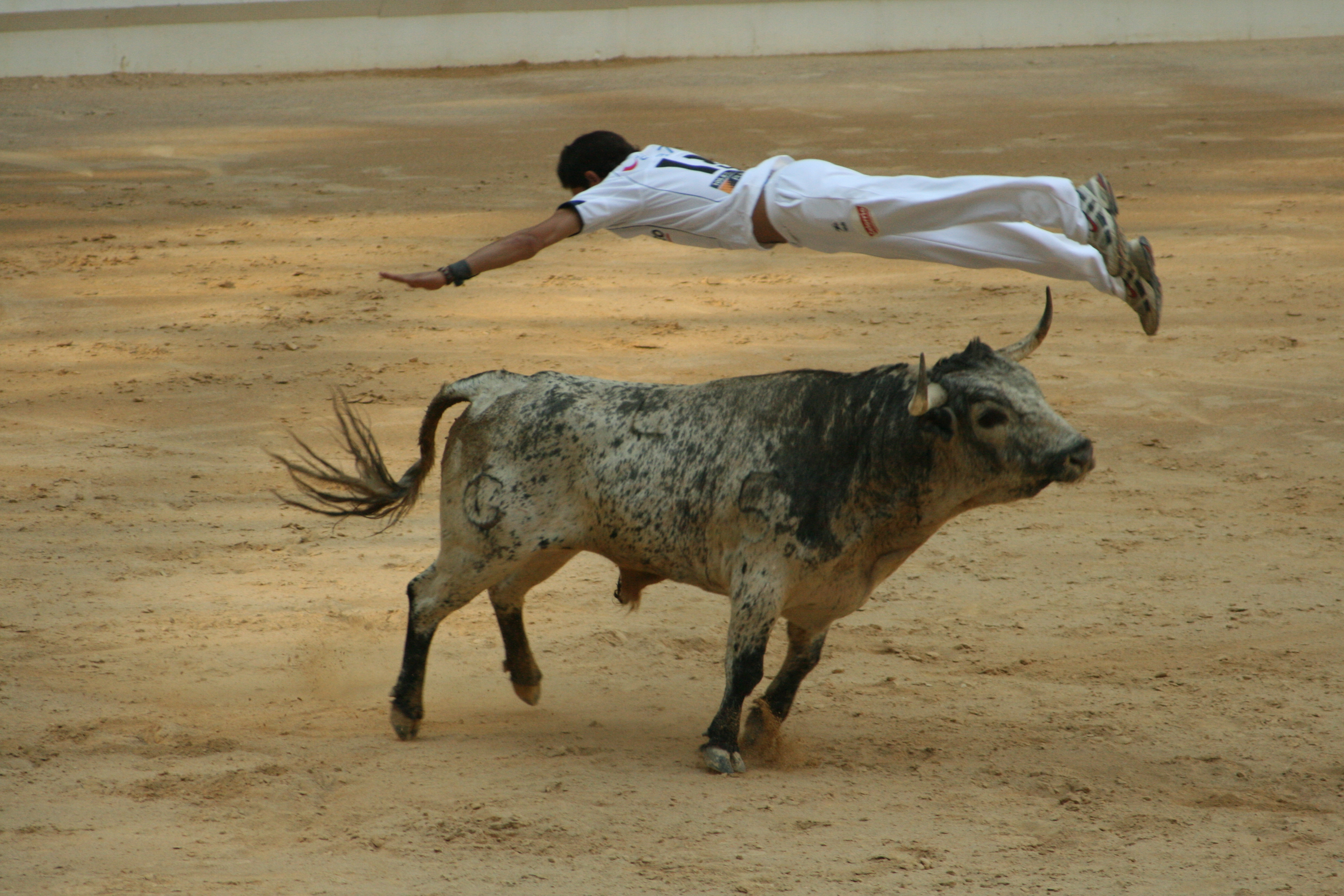
Recortes

- Bull-leaping
  - Course landaise
  - Jallikattu
  - Recortes
- Bull wrestling
  - Bataille de Reines
  - Combat de Reines
  - Tōgyū
- Idi probak
- Kambala
- Pacu jawi
- Running of the bulls
- Yak polo
- Yak racing
- Yak skiing

=== Dog sports ===
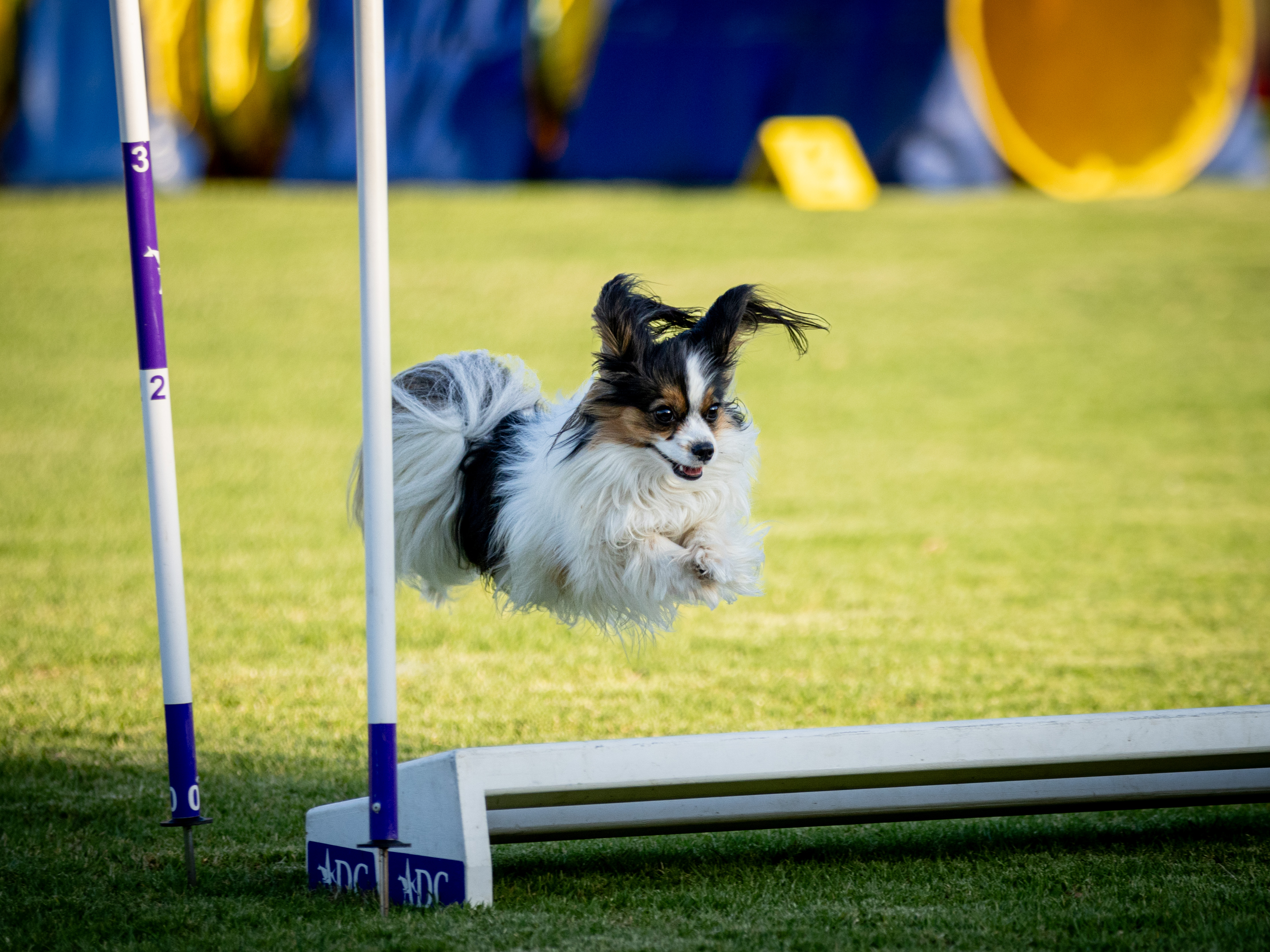
Agility running

Sports in which dogs participate.

- Baiting
- Dog fighting
- Venatio
- Hog-dog rodeo
- Sheepdog trial
- Treibball
- Heelwork to music
- Musical canine freestyle
- Obedience trial
- Rally obedience
- Schutzhund
- Bikejoring
- Canicross
- Carting
- Dog scootering
- Mushing
- Skijoring
- Weight pulling
- Dachshund racing
- Greyhound racing
- Shepherd's Shemozzle
- Sled dog racing
- Terrier racing
- Beagling
- Coon hunting
- Coursing
- Drag hunting
- Earthdog trial
- Field trial
- Fox hunting
- Hare coursing
- Hound trailing
- Hunting the clean boot
- Lure coursing
- Nosework
- Tracking trial
- Trail hunting
- Dock jumping
- Dog surfing
- Agility
- Dog show
- Dog skateboarding
- Disc dog
- Flyball
- Junior showmanship
- Puppy Bowl

=== Equines ===
Sports using a horse.

Horse racing at Arlington Park, 2007

- Buzkashi
- Barrel racing
- Campdrafting
- Cirit
- Charreada
- Chilean rodeo
- Chuckwagon racing
- Cross country
- Cutting
- Dressage
- Endurance riding
- English pleasure
- Equitation
- Eventing
- Equestrian vaulting
- Gymkhana
- Harness racing
- Hobby horse polo
- Trick riding
- Horse racing
- Horse polo, or polo
- Horseball
- Jineteada gaucha
- Jousting
- Mounted games
- Mounted archery
- Organized horse fighting
- Pato
- Pleasure driving
- Reining
- Rodeo
- Show hunter (British)
- Show jumping
- Steeplechase
- Sur-papakh
- Team penning
- Tent pegging
- Western pleasure

=== Fishing ===
- Angling
- Big-game fishing
- Casting
- Noodling
- Spearfishing
- Sport fishing
- Surf fishing
- Rock fishing
- Fly fishing
- Ice fishing
- Bass fishing

=== Hunting ===
Sometimes considered blood sports.

- Beagling
- Big game hunting
- Boar hunting
- Hunting by cheetah
- Deer hunting
- Fox hunting
- Wolf hunting

=== Rodeo-originated ===
Sports that have originated from rodeos in the old Western Americas.

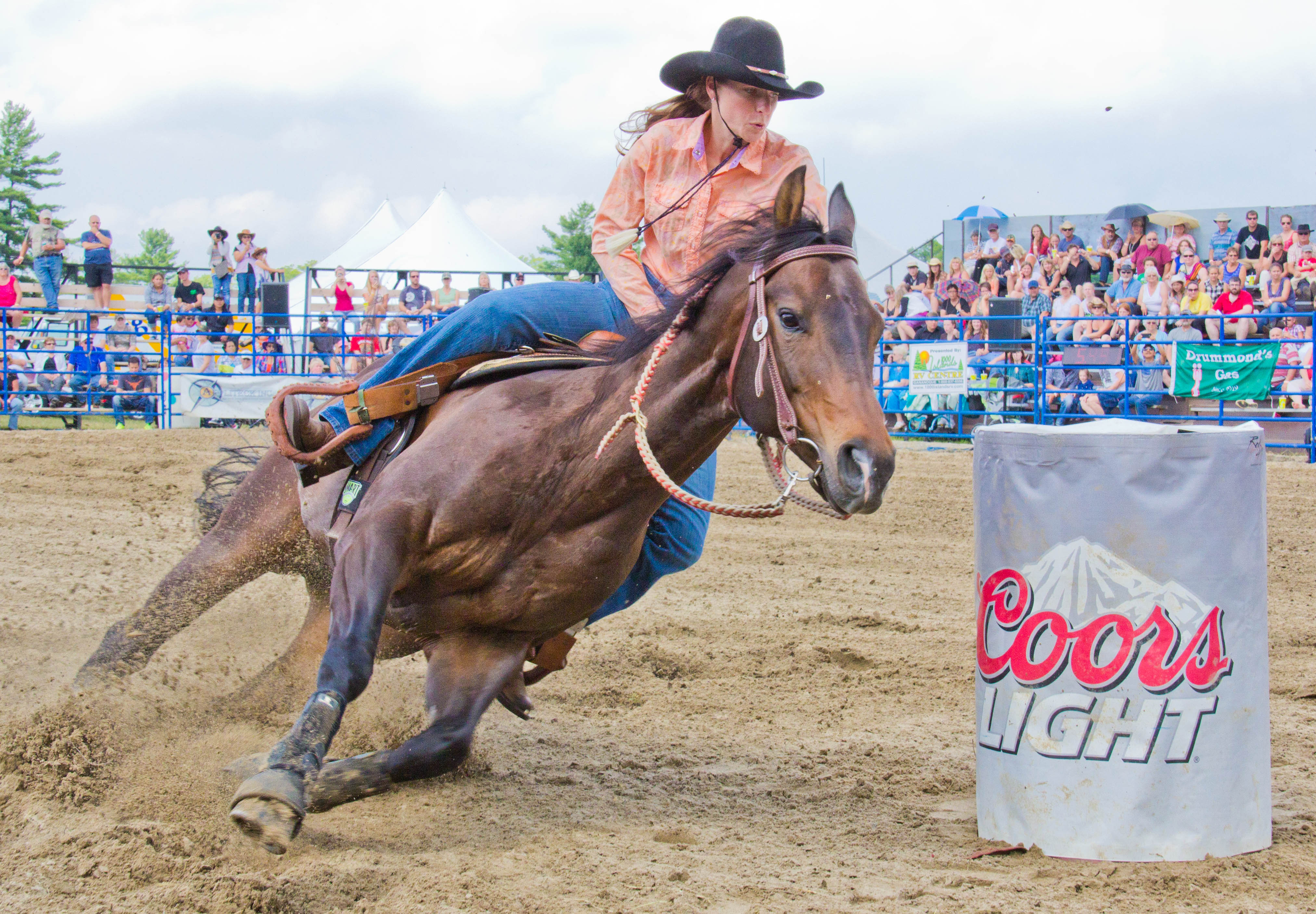
Barrel racing

- Barrel racing
- Bronc riding
  - Saddle Bronc Riding
  - Bareback Bronc Riding
- Bull riding
  - Miniature Bull Riding
- Charrería
  - Jaripeo
- Chilean rodeo
- Goat tying
- Indian rodeo
- Pole bending
- Roping
  - Breakaway Roping
  - Tie-down Roping
  - Team roping
  - Steer roping
- Steer riding
- Steer wrestling

=== Others ===
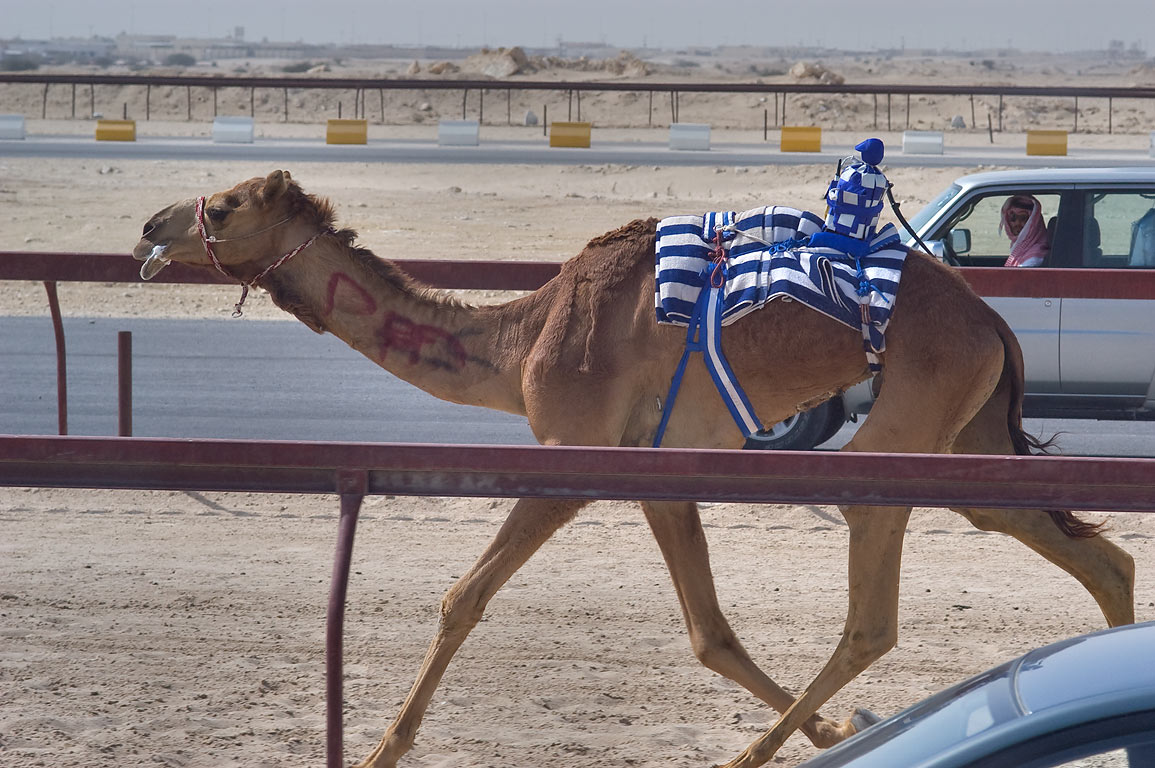
Camel racing with robot jockey

- Elephants
  - Elephant football
  - Elephant polo
  - Elephant racing
- Camel
  - Camel racing
    - Robot jockey
  - Camel polo
  - Camel wrestling
- Other ungulates
  - Goat racing
  - Pig racing
  - Ram fighting
- Small mammals
  - Cat agility
  - Ferret-legging
  - Hamster racing
  - Rabbit show jumping
  - Rat agility
  - Squirrel fishing
- Birds
  - Bird singing contest
  - Cockfighting
  - Flying duck race
  - Ostrich racing
  - Pigeon racing
  - Pigeon-shooting
  - Vinkensport
- Herpetiles
  - Alligator wrestling
  - Frog jumping contest
  - Rattlesnake round-up
  - Toad Day Out
  - Turtle racing
- Invertebrates
  - Cricket-spitting
  - Insect fighting
    - Cricket fighting
  - Snail racing
  - Spider fighting
  - Worm charming

== Athletics ==
Track and field

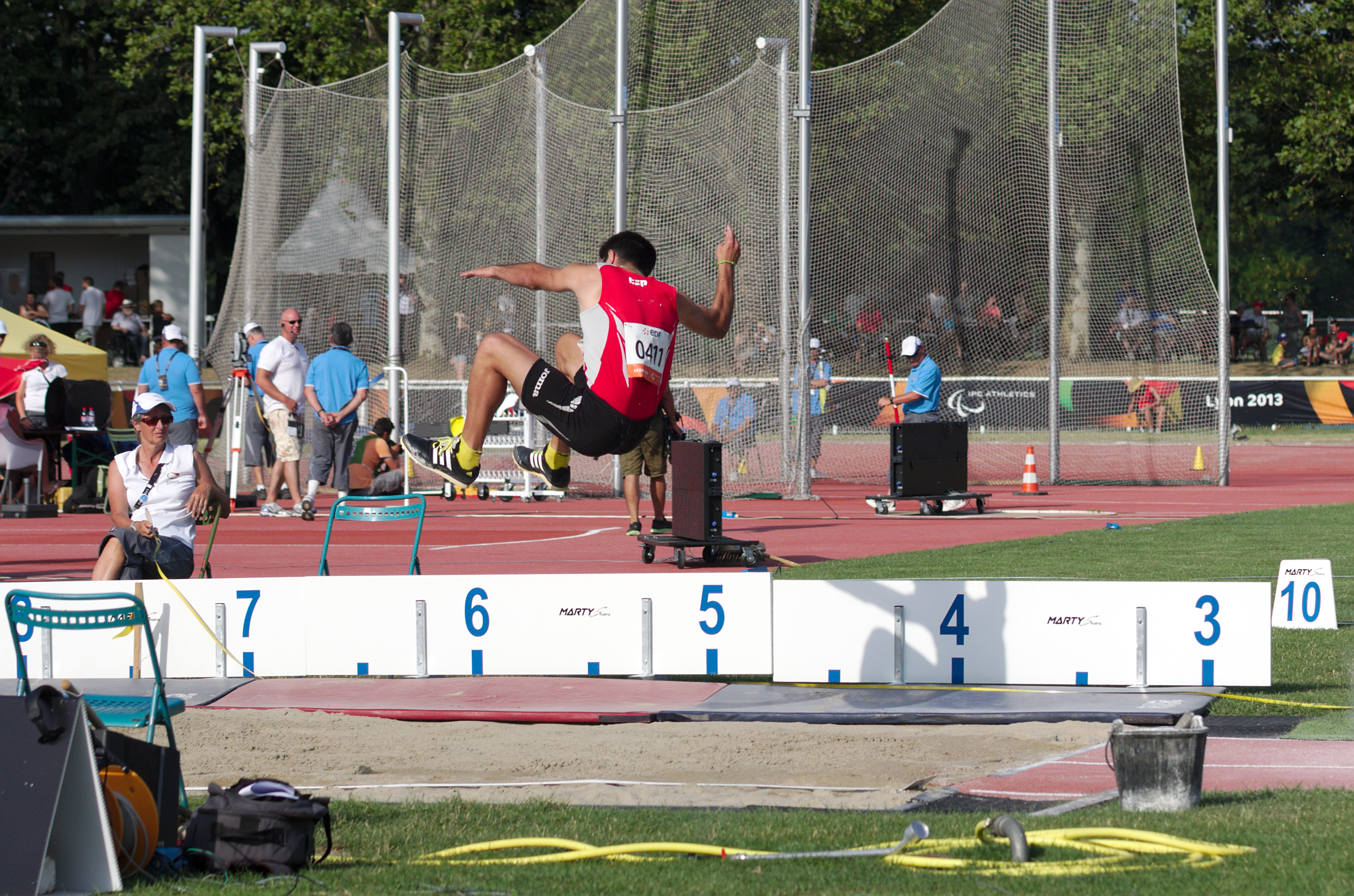
Long jump

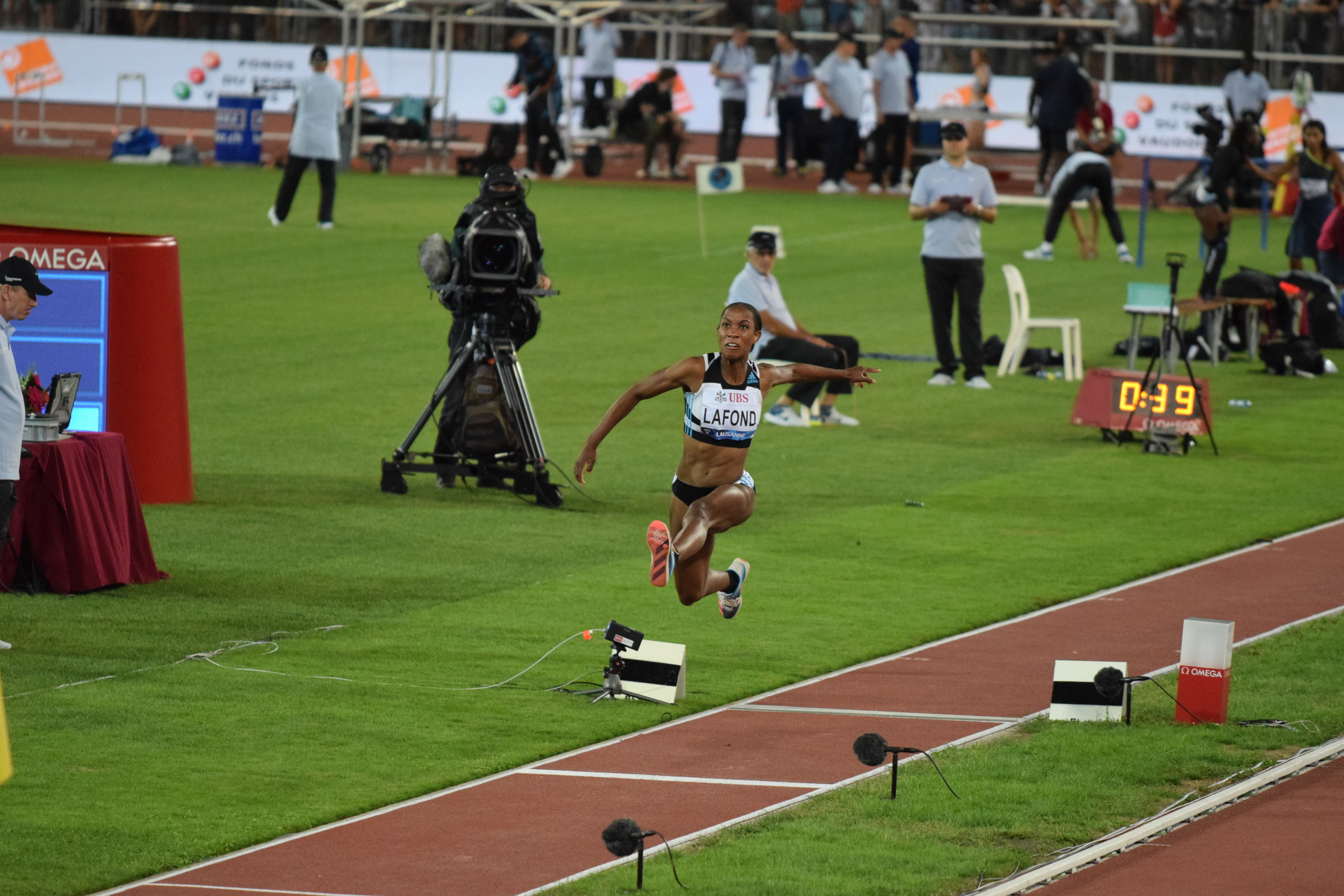
Triple jump

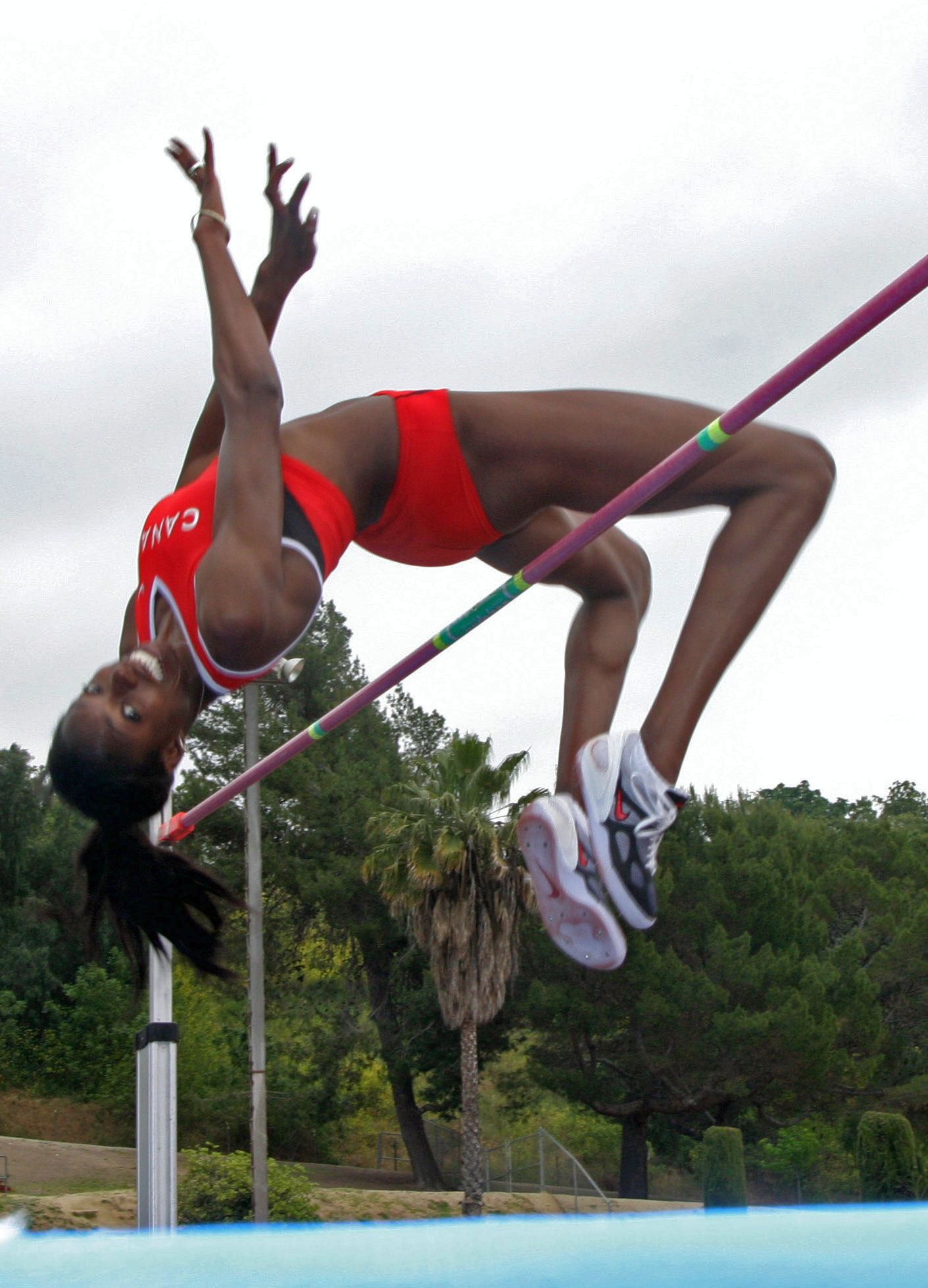
High jump

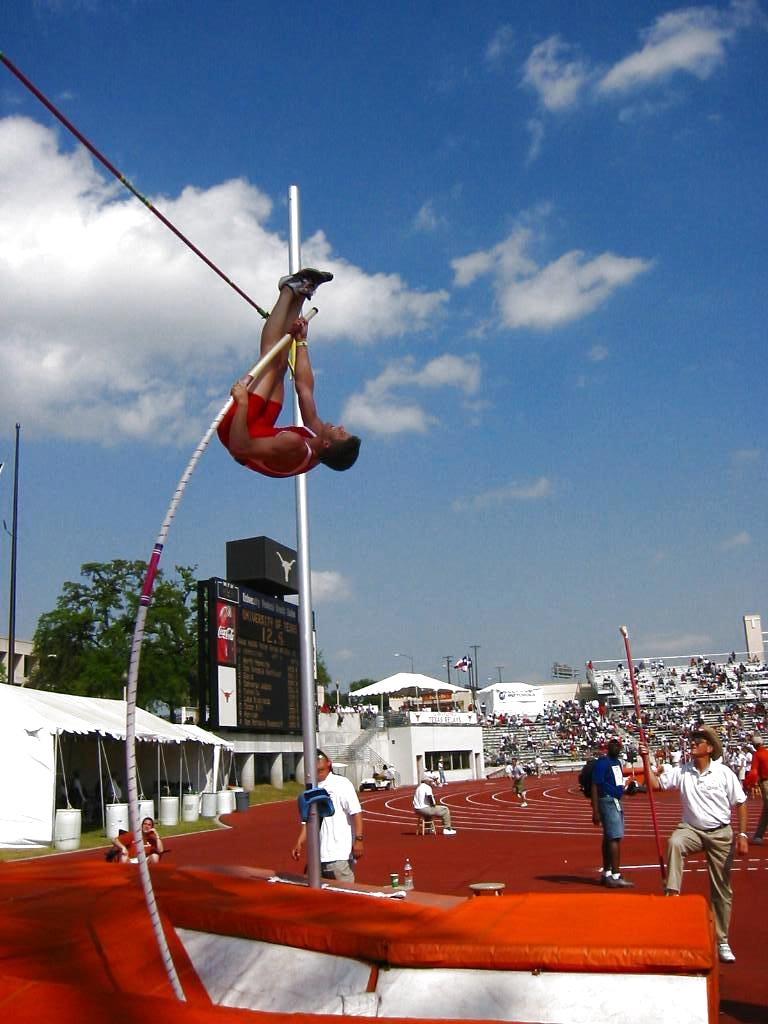
Pole vault

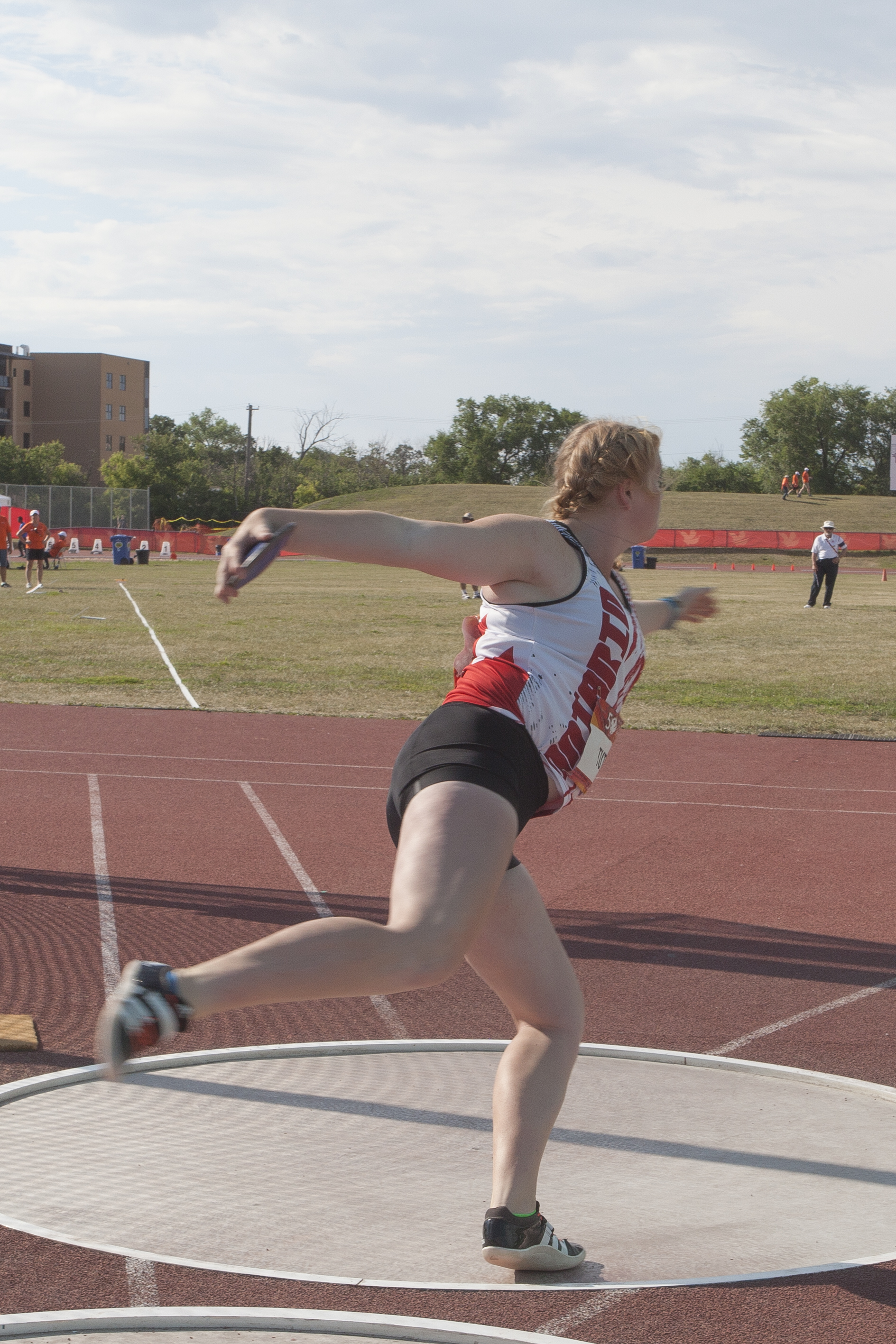
Discus throw

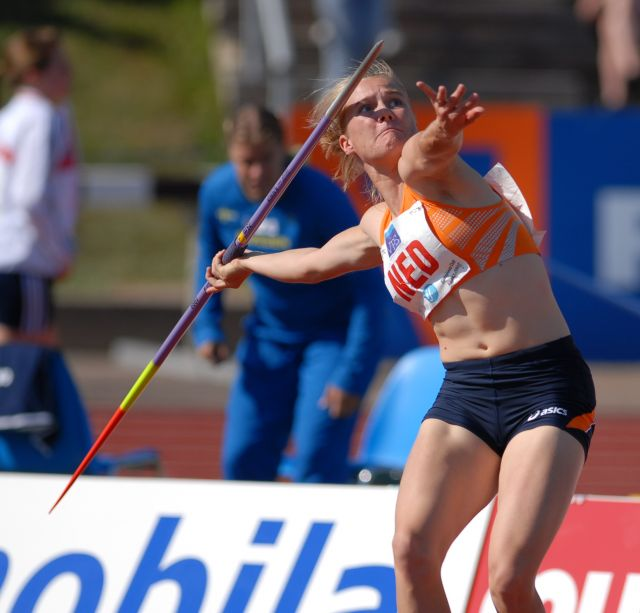
Javelin throw

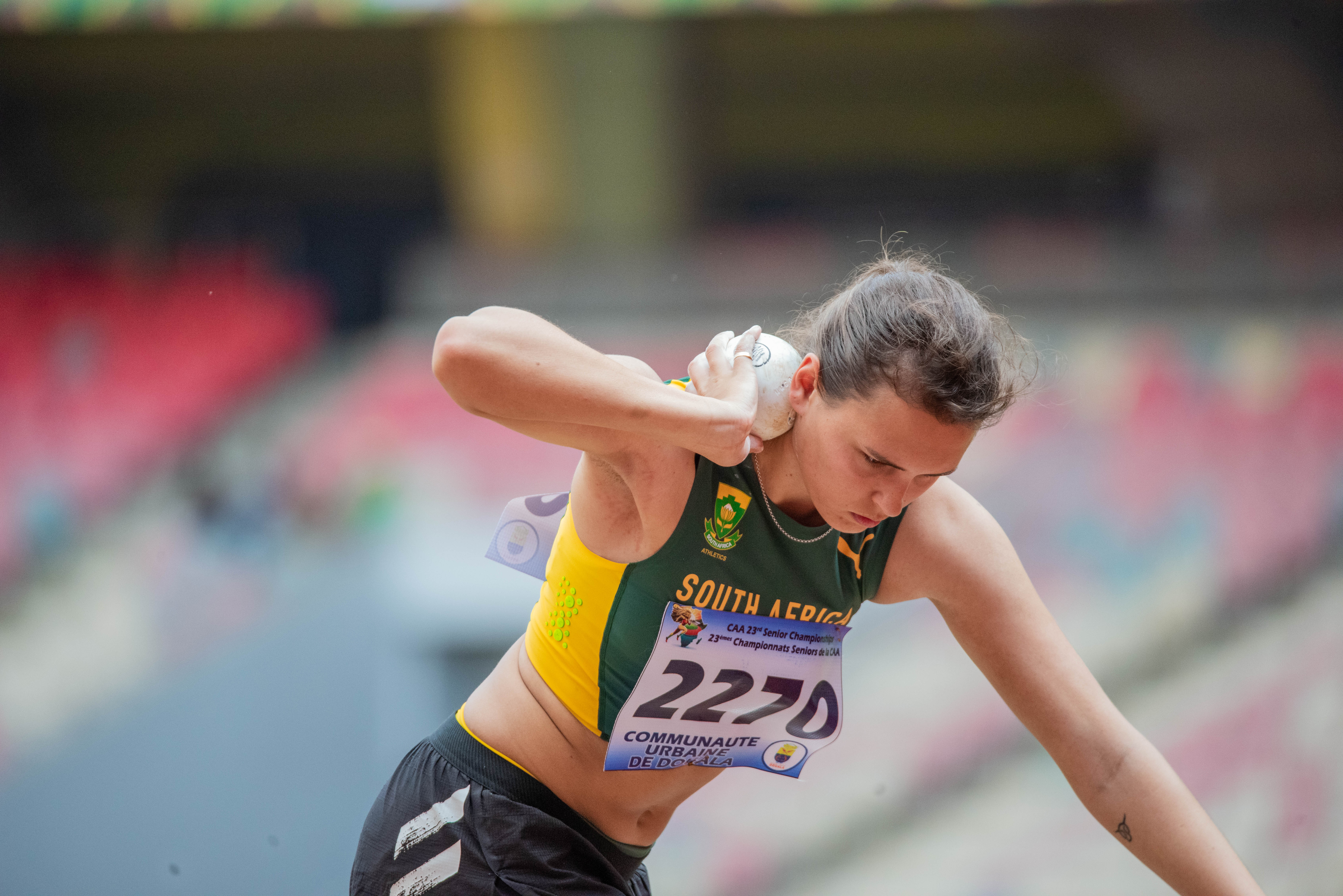
Shot put

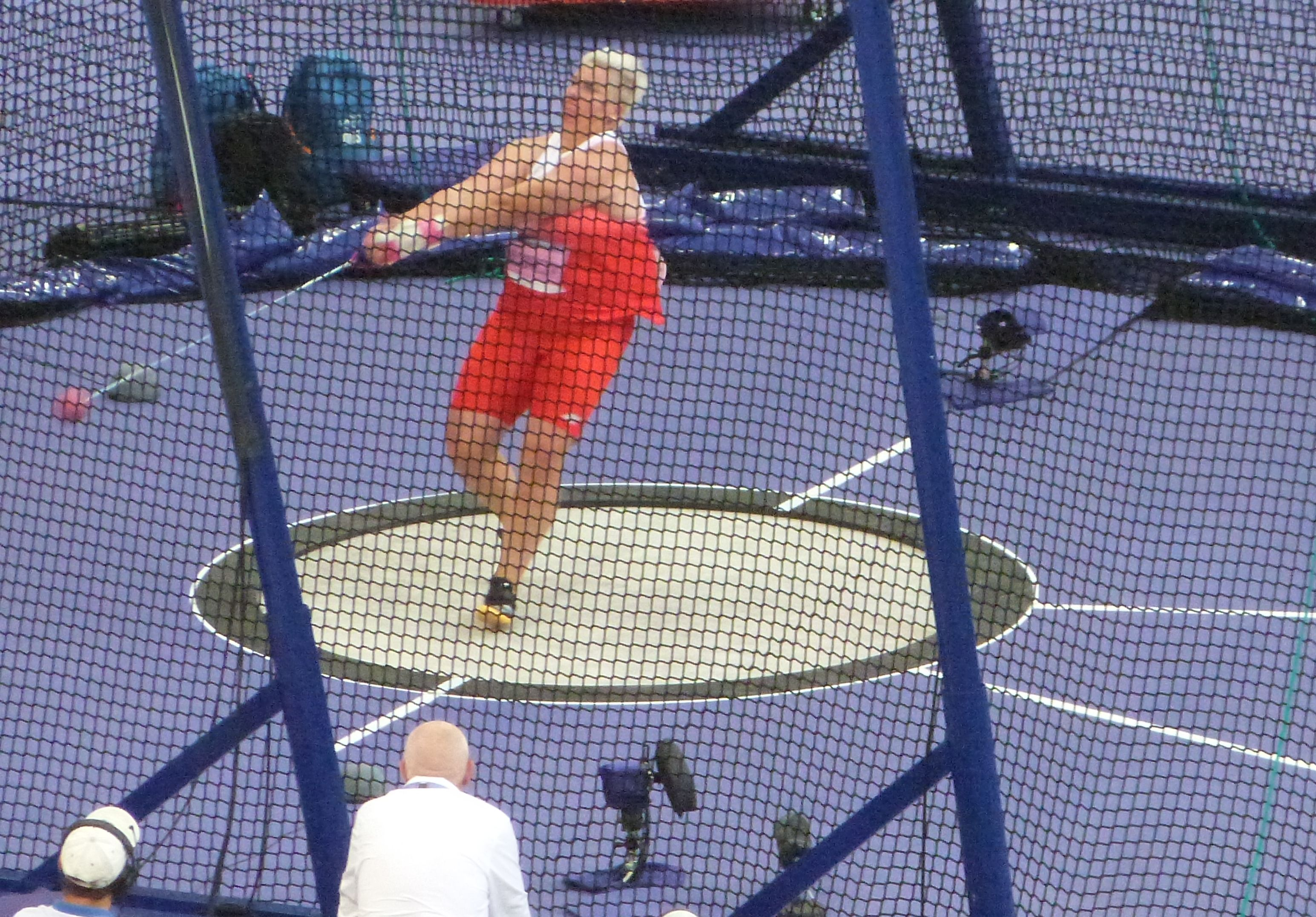
Hammer throw

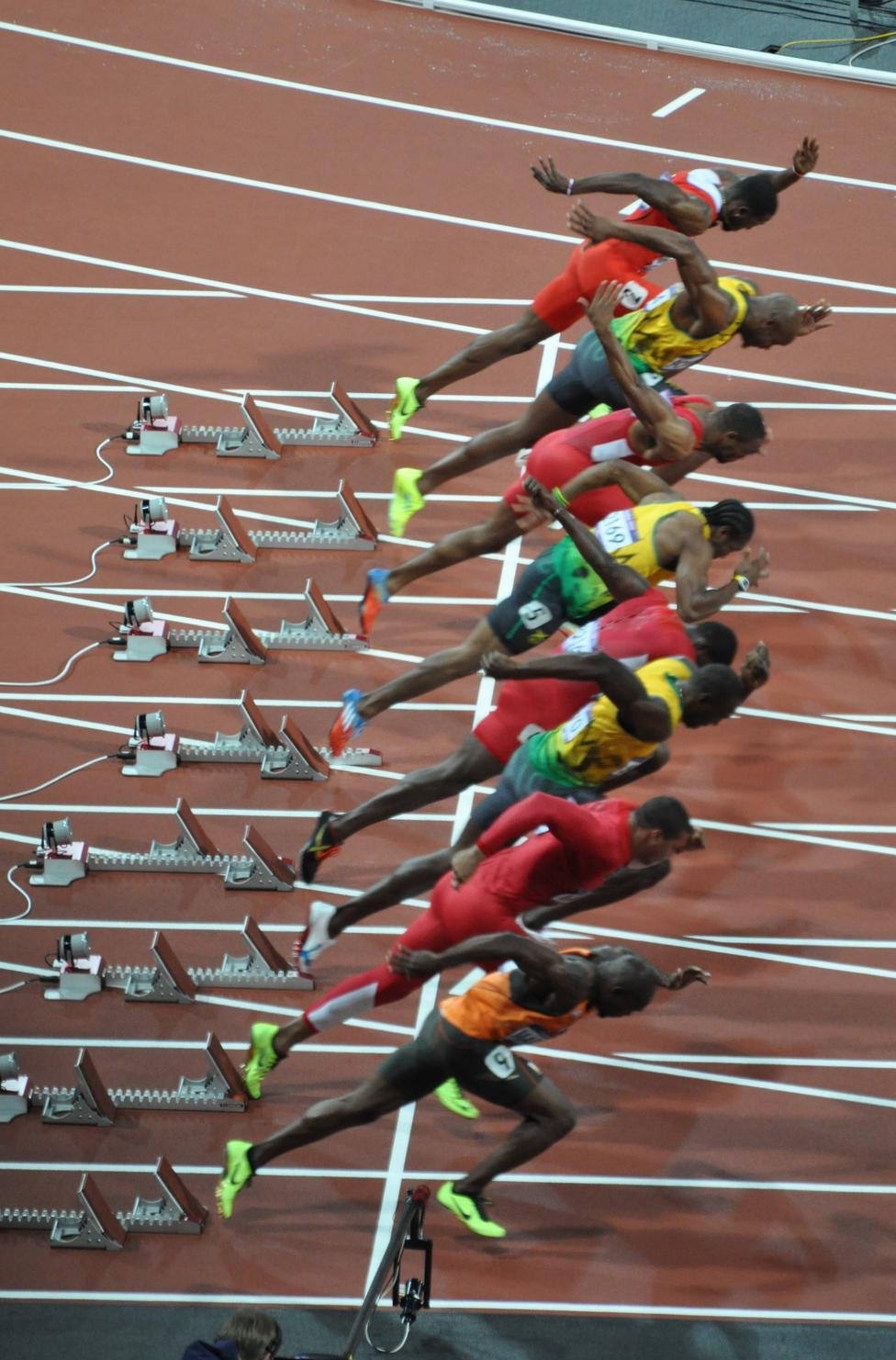
100 meters

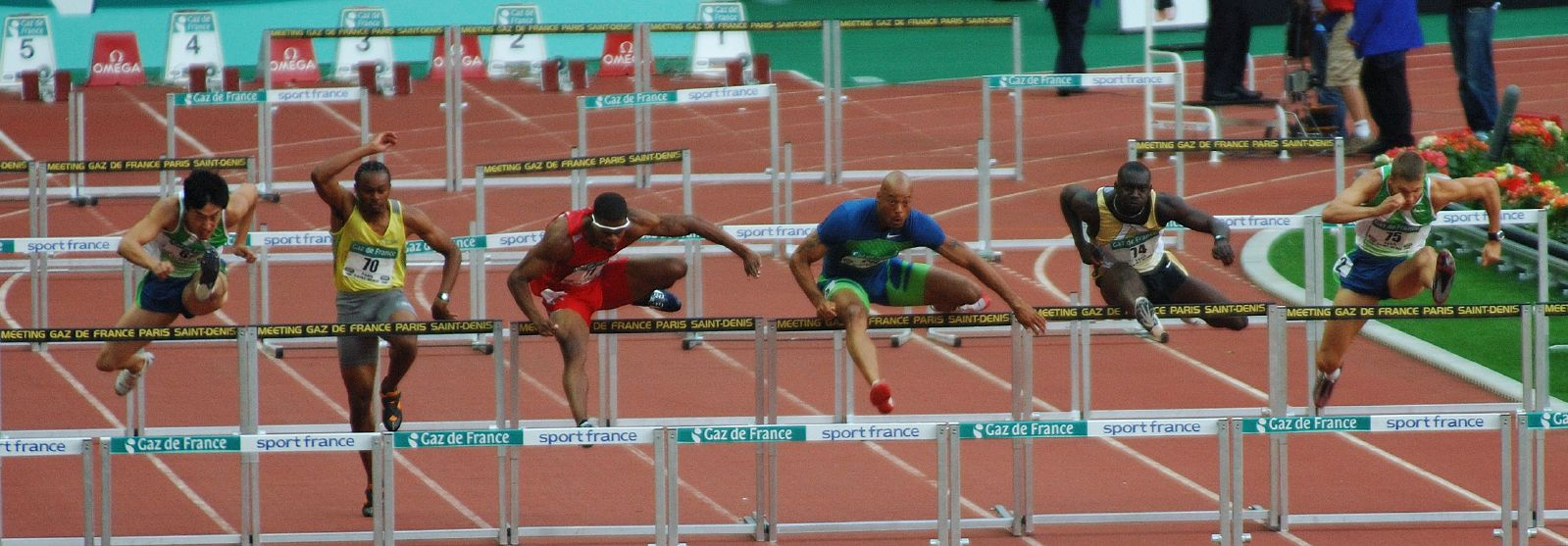
110 meters hurdles

The three activities in Track and field, from top-bottom rows: jumping, throwing and running.

=== Jumping ===
- Long jump
  - Standing long jump
- Triple jump
  - Standing triple jump
- High jump
  - Standing high jump
- Pole vault
- Vertical jump

=== Throwing ===
- Boomerang
- Discus
- Hammer throw
- Javelin
- Shot put
- Parasports
  - Club throw
  - Softball throw
- Throws pentathlon
- Traditional
  - Keg-tossing
  - Weight over bar
  - Weight throw

=== Running ===
- Endurance
  - Middle-distance
    - 500 metres
    - 600 metres
    - 800 metres
    - 1000 metres
    - 1500 metres
    - 1600 meters
    - Mile run
    - 2000 metres
    - 3000 metres
    - 3200 meters
    - Two miles
  - Long-distance
    - 5000 metres
    - 10,000 metres
    - 20,000 metres
    - Road running
      - Marathon
      - Half marathon
      - Ultramarathon
      - 5K run
      - 10K run
      - 15K run
      - 20K run
      - 25K run
      - 10-mile run
      - One hour run
    - Cross country running
  - Tower running
  - Snowshoe running
  - Fell running
  - Trail running
  - Mountain running
  - Racewalking
    - Mile walk
    - 3000 metres
    - 5000 metres
    - 10,000 metres
    - 20,000 metres
    - 35 kilometres
    - 50 kilometres
    - 50 miles
    - 100 kilometres
  - Skyrunning
- Sprint
  - 60 metres
  - 100 metres
  - 200 metres
    - 200 metres straight
  - 400 metres
  - 50 metres
  - 55 metres
  - 60-yard dash
  - 100-yard dash
  - 440-yard dash
  - 150 metres
  - 300 metres
  - Historic
    - Stadion
    - Diaulos
- Relay race
  - 4 × 100
  - 4 × 200
  - 4 × 400
  - 4 × 800
  - 4 × 1500
  - 4 × mile
  - Sprint medley relay
  - Distance medley relay
  - Swedish relay
  - Marathon race walk mixed relay
  - Ekiden
  - River to River Relay
- Hurdles
  - 60 metres
  - 100 metres
  - 110 metres
  - 400 metres
  - 300 metres
  - 80 metres
  - Low hurdles
  - Steeplechase
    - 2000 metres steeplechase
    - 3000 metres steeplechase
- Shuttle hurdle relay

=== Combined ===
- Pentathlon
  - Throws pentathlon
  - Women pentathlon
- Hexathlon
- Heptathlon
- Octathlon
- Decathlon
- Tetradecathlon
- Icosathlon

== Ball games ==
=== Bat-and-ball games (safe haven games) ===
Games in which the objective of the offensive team is to reach safe havens to score runs, and of the defense to prevent it.

Major Bat and ball games

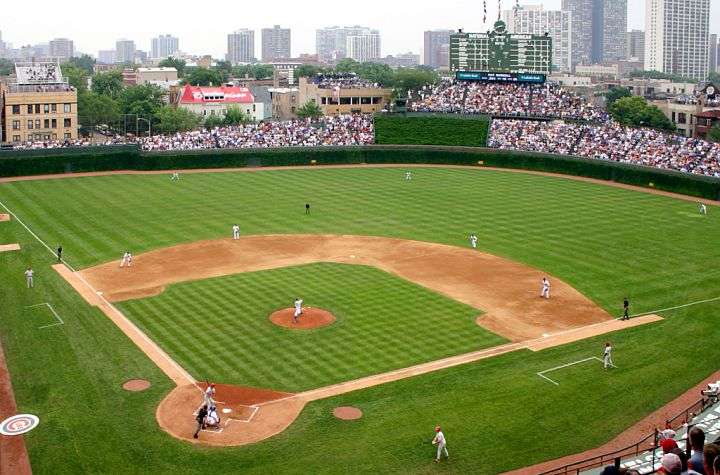
Baseball

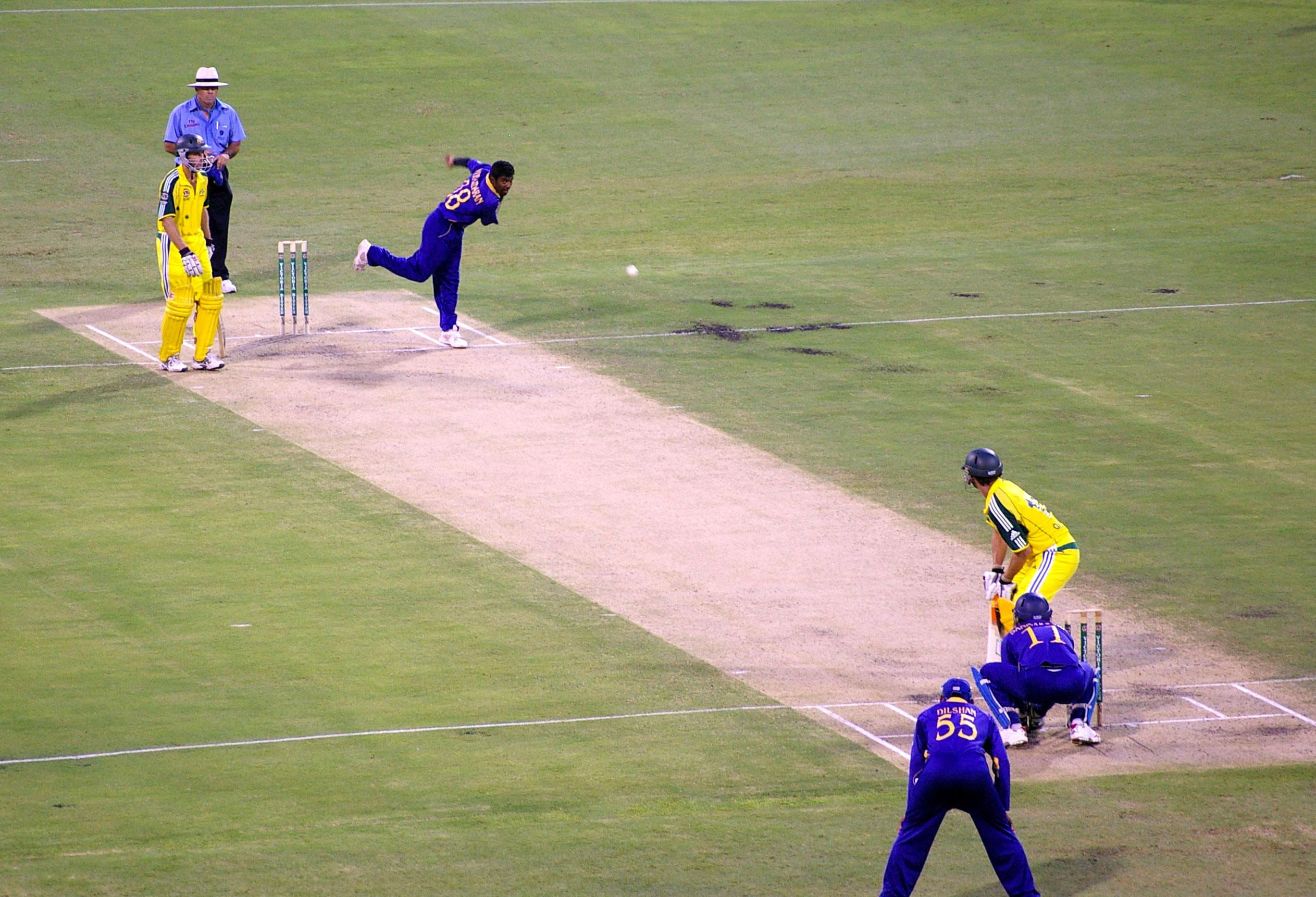
Cricket

Baseball-like (roundball)

- Baseball
  - Barnstorming
    - Banana Ball
    - Cosmic baseball
  - Beeball
  - Blind baseball
    - Beep baseball
  - Chapitas
  - College baseball
  - Extreme Baseball
  - Half-rubber
  - Historic
    - Knickerbocker Rules
    - The Massachusetts Game – four bases
    - Town ball – variable
    - Vintage base ball
  - Indian Ball
  - Japanese-style baseball
  - No base running
    - Corkball – four bases
      - Fuzzball (sport)
    - Wiffleball
  - Over-the-line
  - Sandlot ball
  - Sans bat
    - Baseball5
    - Bolita de cancha
    - Cuatro esquinas
    - Hotbox
    - Kickball
      - Matball
    - Pelotica de goma
    - Punchball
    - Rigoball
    - Stoop ball
    - Wireball
  - Scrub baseball – four bases (not a team game per se)
  - Snow baseball
  - Softball
    - 16-inch softball
    - Fast-pitch softball
  - Stickball – variable
    - Vitilla – three bases
  - Tee-ball
  - Women baseball
- Brännboll – four bases
- British baseball (Pêl-Fas) – four posts
- Elle
- Pesäpallo – four bases
- Rap7 ball
- Rounders – four bases or posts
  - GAA rounders
- Thèque

Cricket-like

- Cricket – two creases
  - Backyard cricket
  - Club cricket
  - First-class cricket
    - Test cricket
      - Timeless Test
  - French cricket
  - Ice cricket
  - Indoor cricket
    - Indoor cricket (UK variant)
  - Kilikiti
  - Kwik cricket
  - Last man stands cricket
  - Limited overs cricket
    - List A cricket
      - ODI
    - Short form cricket
      - 100-ball cricket
      - T10 cricket
      - Twenty20
        - T20I
  - Parasports
    - Blind cricket
    - Deaf cricket
    - One-armed versus one-legged cricket
    - Table Cricket
  - Sans bat
    - Kick-it cricket
    - Leg cricket
  - Single wicket
    - Continuous cricket
      - Tip-and-Run cricket
  - Softball cricket
  - Tennis ball cricket
    - Tape ball cricket
  - Trobriand cricket
  - Windball cricket
  - Women cricket
    - Women Test
    - Women ODI
    - Women T20
- Bete-ombro
- Crocker
- Plaquita
- Stoolball – two stools
- Vigoro – two wickets
- Wicket

Longball

- Danish longball
- Lapta – two salos (bases)
- Oină
- Palant
- Schlagball

Other games

- Bat and trap
- Gillidanda
- Old cat – variable
- Pärk

=== Billiards ===
==== Cue sports ====
Cue sports main families

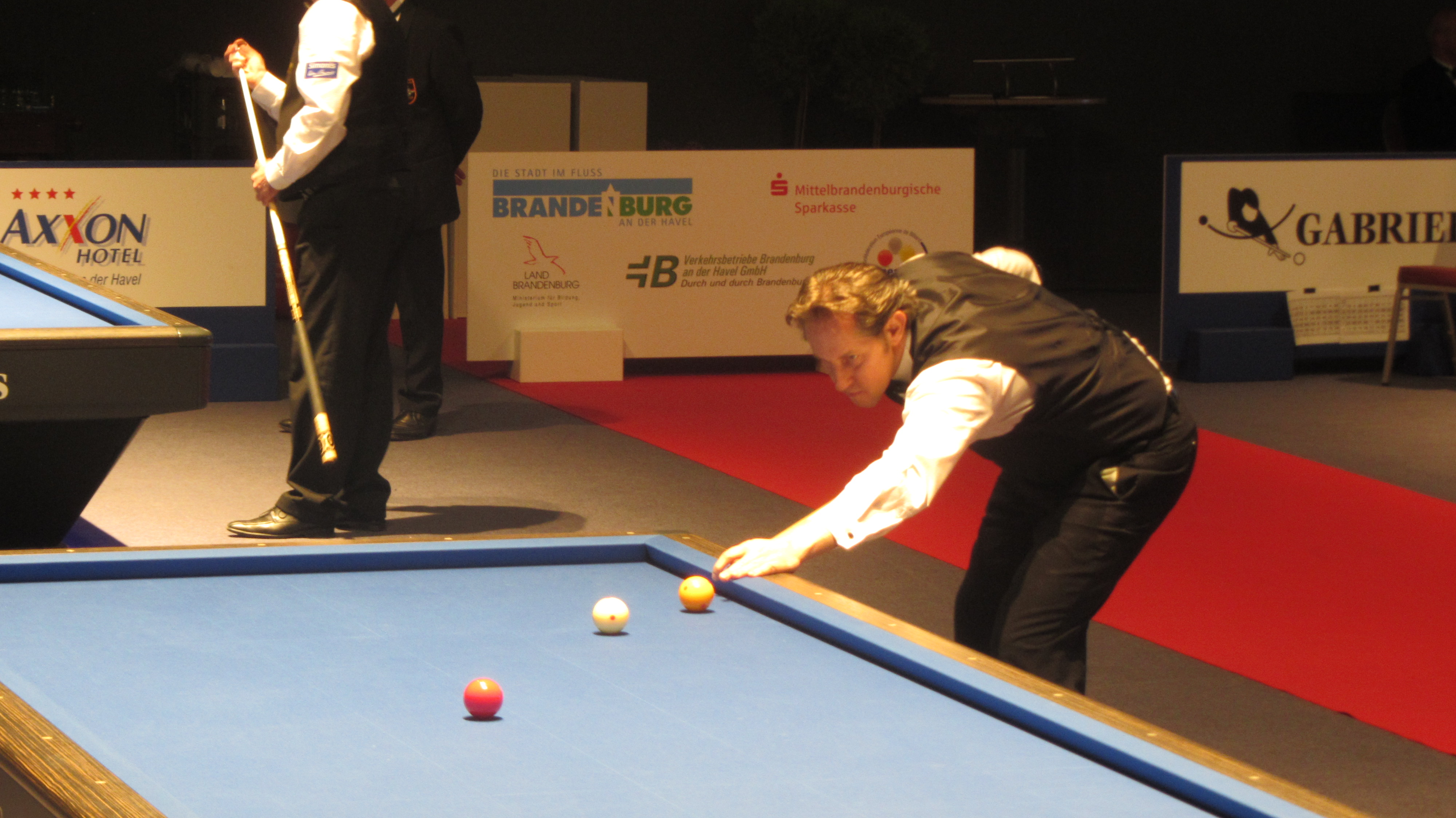
Carom

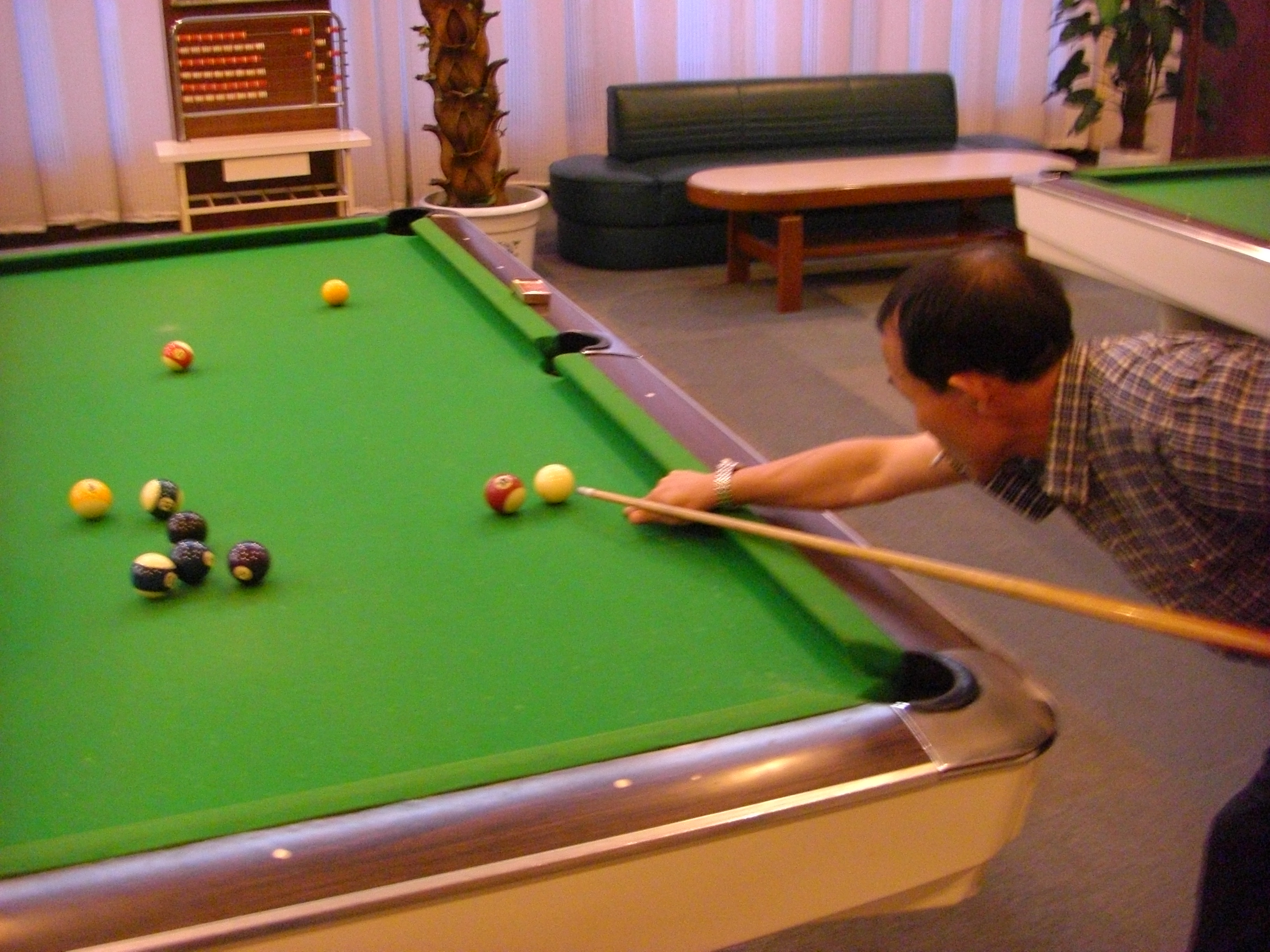
Pool

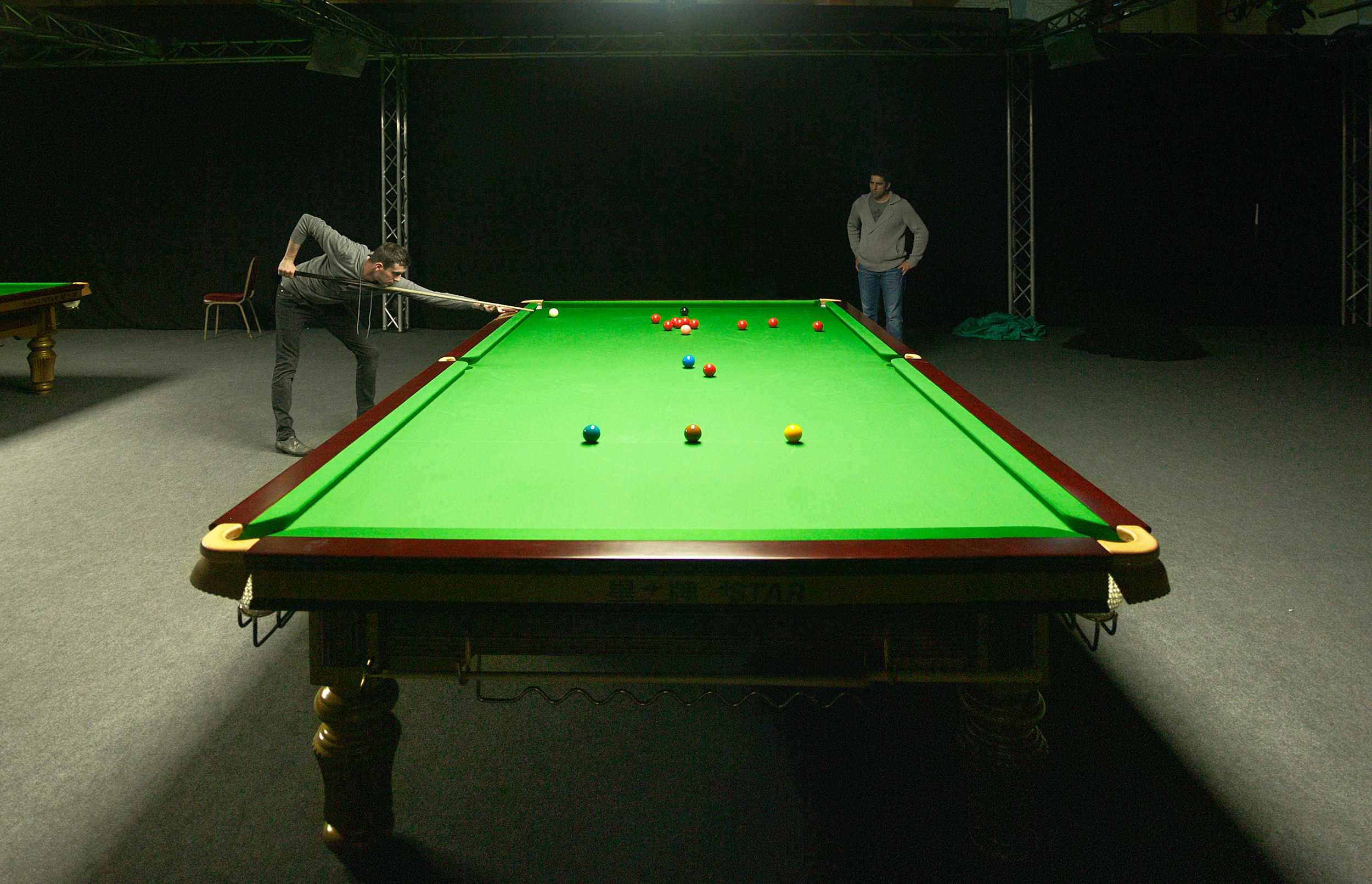
Snooker

- Pocket games
  - Carrom
    - Novuss
    - Pichenotte
      - Pitchnut
  - Pool
    - Eight-ball
    - Blackball (a.k.a. British eight-ball pool)
    - Nine-ball
    - Straight pool (14.1 continuous)
    - One-pocket
    - Three-ball
    - Seven-ball
    - Ten-ball
    - Rotation
    - Baseball pocket billiards
    - Cribbage (pool)
    - Bank pool
    - Artistic pool
    - Trick shot competition
    - Speed pool
    - Bowlliards
    - Chicago
    - Honolulu
    - Kelly pool
    - Cutthroat
    - Killer
    - Russian pyramid
  - Snooker
    - American snooker
    - Black pool
    - Crud
    - Golf pool
    - Life pool
    - Power Snooker
    - Pyramid pool
    - Fifteen-ball pool
    - Sinuca brasileira
    - Six-red snooker
    - Snooker plus
    - Snooker Shoot Out
    - Tenball
- Carom billiards
  - Straight rail
  - Balkline
  - One-cushion carom
  - Three-cushion billiards
  - Five-pins
    - Boccette
  - Four-ball
  - Artistic billiards
- Hybrid carom–pocket games
  - English billiards
  - Bottle pool
  - Cowboy
  - Kaisa
  - Slosh
- Obstacle variations
  - Bagatelle
  - Bar billiards
  - Bumper pool
  - Pin billiards
    - Danish pin billiards
    - Goriziana

==== Ground billiards ====
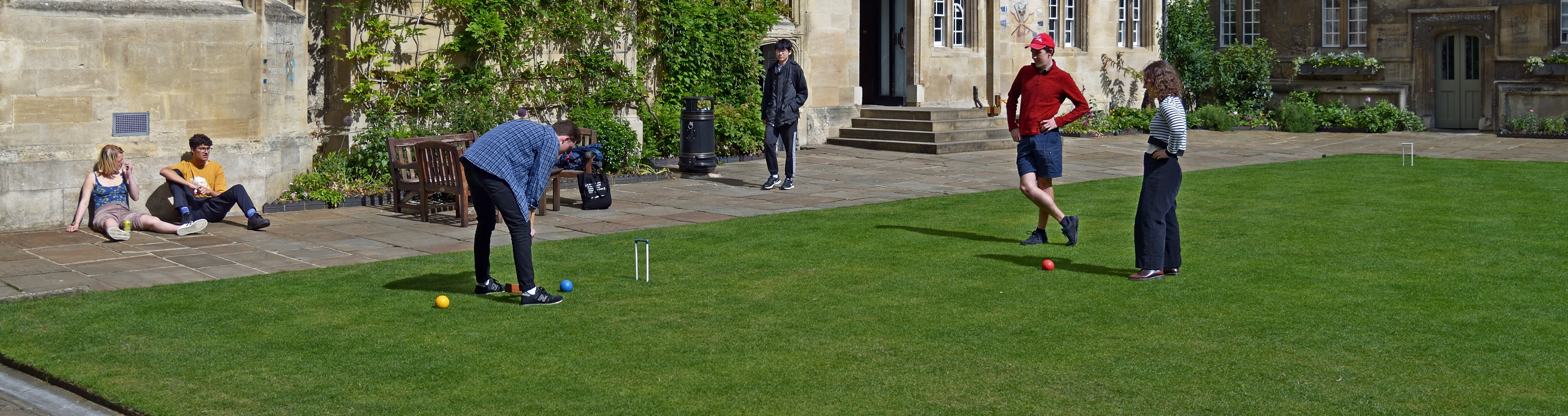
Croquet

- Pall-mall
  - Croquet
    - Roque
- Gateball
- Trucco
- Woodball

=== Boules sports ===
Games which the objective is to throw, roll or slide balls as closely as possible to a jack or target.

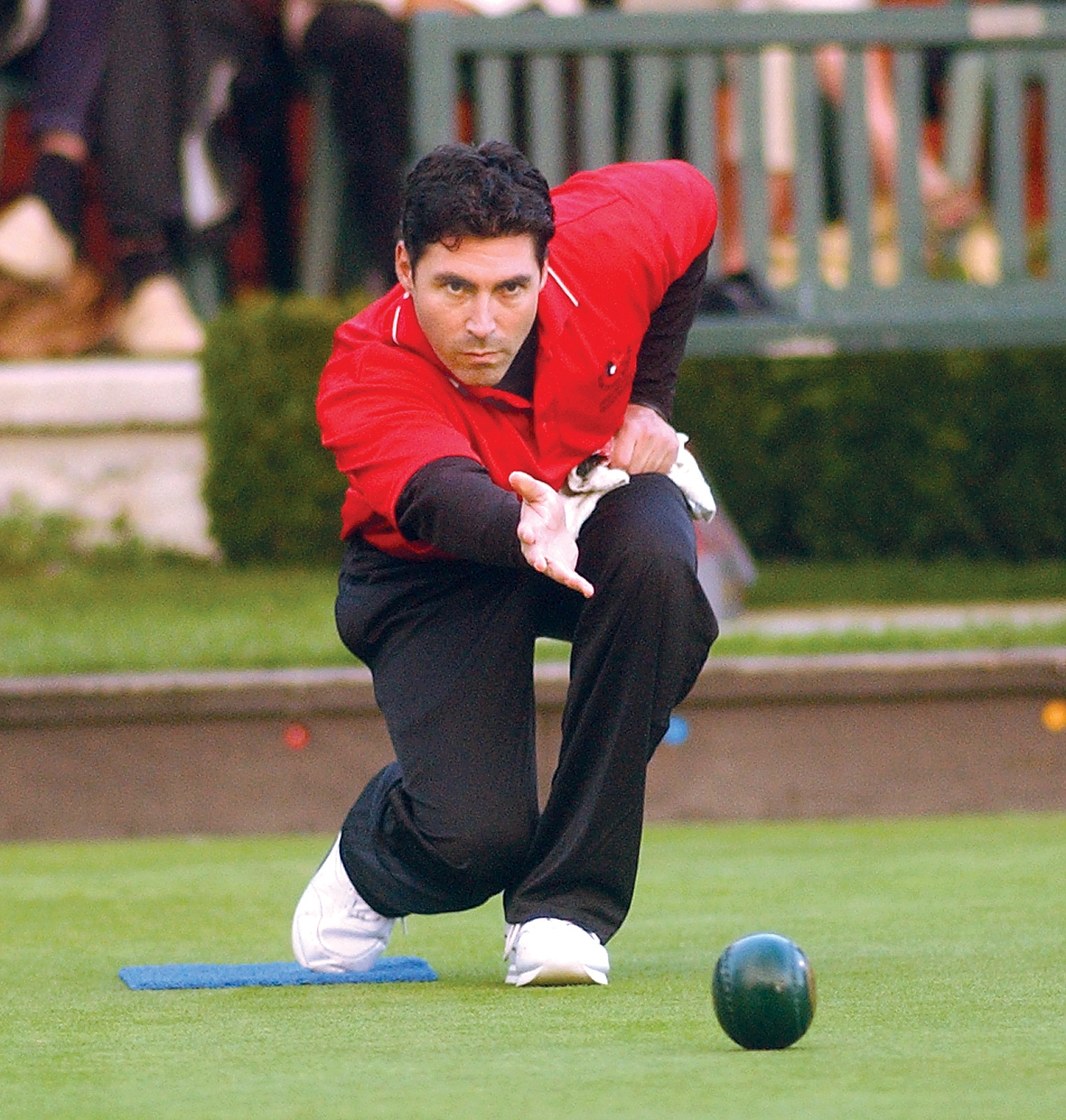
Lawn bowls

- Bocce
- Bocce volo
- Boccia
- Bolas criollas
- Boules
- Bowls a.k.a. lawn bowls
  - New Zealand Indoor Bowls
- Curling
  - Crokicurl
  - Wheelchair curling
- Ice stock sport
- Jeu provençal (boule lyonnaise)
- Marbles
- Pétanque
  - Taistelupetankki
- Raffa
- Shuffleboard

=== Bowling ===
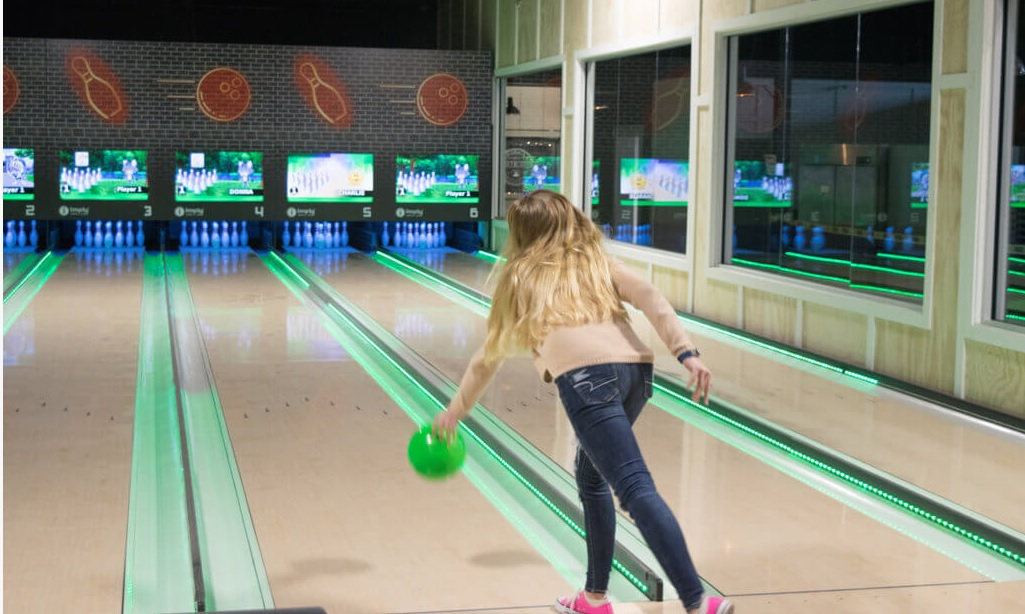
Bowling

- Candlepin bowling
- Duckpin bowling
- Five-pin bowling
- Nine-pin bowling
- Ten-pin bowling
- Trick bowling
- Turkey bowling
- Basque bowls
  - Bolo palma
- Fowling
- Skittles
  - Finnish skittles
  - Mölkky
  - Table skittles
    - Devil among the tailors

=== Dodgeball ===
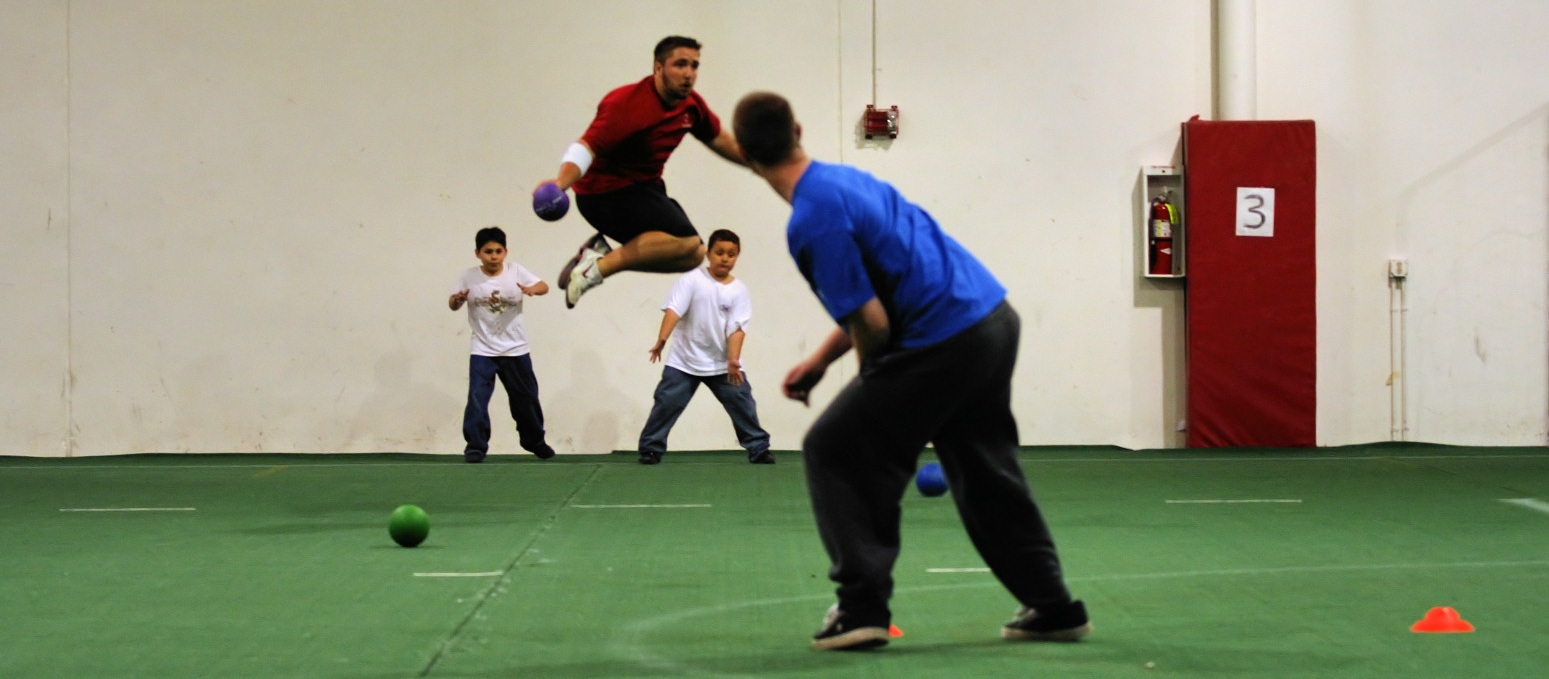
Dodgeball

- Beach dodgeball
- Extreme Dodgeball
- Dandy shandy
- Gaga
- Maram Pitti
- Prisonball
- Seven stones
- Spud

=== Golf ===
Sports which score is counted in reference to par

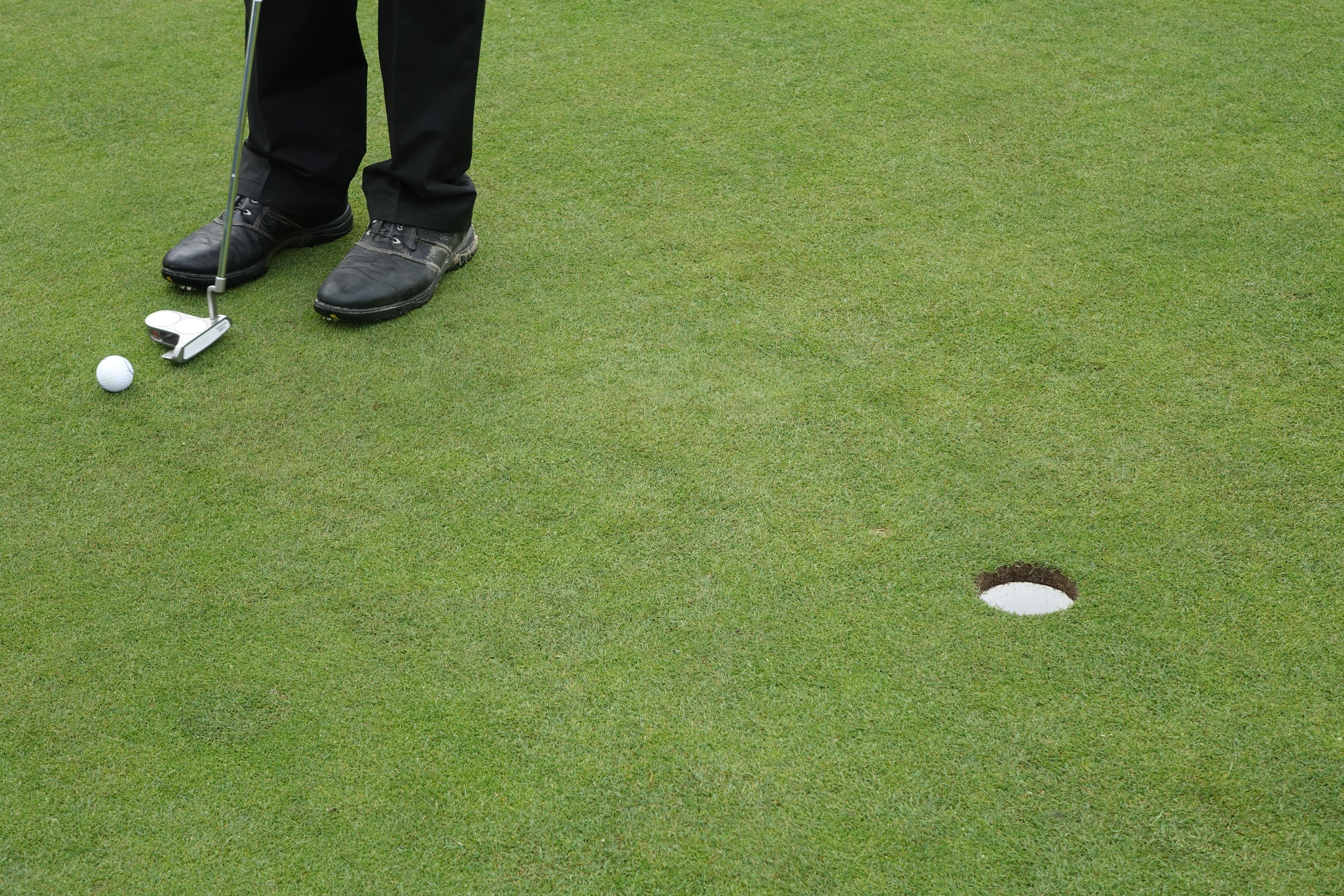
Golf player using a putter to score

- Backyard golf
- Beach golf
- Chuiwan
- Clock golf
- Codeball
- Dart golf
- Disc golf
- Farmersgolf
- Footgolf
- Four-ball golf
- Foursomes
- Fungo golf
- GolfCross
- Ground golf
- Hickory golf
- Indoor golf
- Long drive
- Match play
- Miniature golf
- Park golf
- Pitch and putt
- PowerPlay Golf
- Sholf
- Shotgun start
- Skins game
- Snow golf
- Speed golf
- Stableford
- Stroke play
  - Par
- Swingolf
- Topgolf
- Urban golf

=== Invasion games ===
Sports in which the method of scoring is through goals.

==== Basketball ====
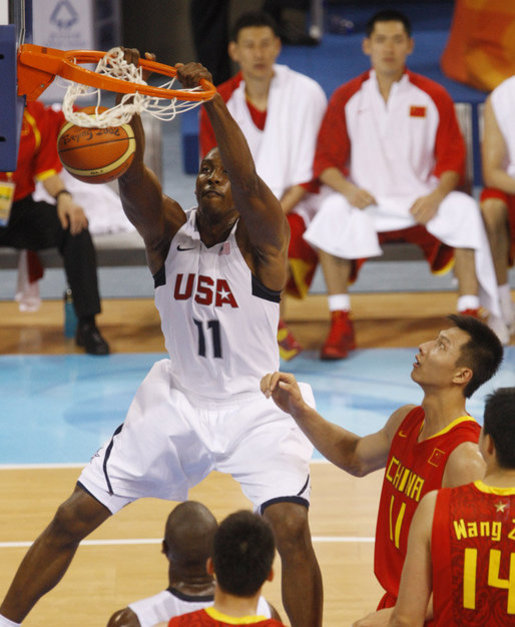
Basketball player Dwight Howard making a slam dunk at the 2008 Summer Olympics.

- Basketball
  - 3x3 basketball
  - Beach basketball
  - Biddy Basketball
  - College basketball
  - Deaf basketball
  - Donkey basketball
  - Hotshot
  - One-on-one
  - Piterbasket
  - Pop-A-Shot
  - Rezball
  - Roller basketball
  - Six-on-six basketball
  - Slamball
  - Streetball
  - Super Shot
  - Twenty-one
  - Unicycle basketball
  - Water basketball
  - Wheelchair basketball
  - Netball
    - Fast5 netball
    - Indoor netball
    - Walking netball
    - Wheelchair netball
    - Varsity netball
- Canoe polo
- Cestoball
- Dueball
- Flickerball
- Korfball
  - Beach korfball
- Pato
  - Horseball
- Ringball

==== Football ====
Main football codes

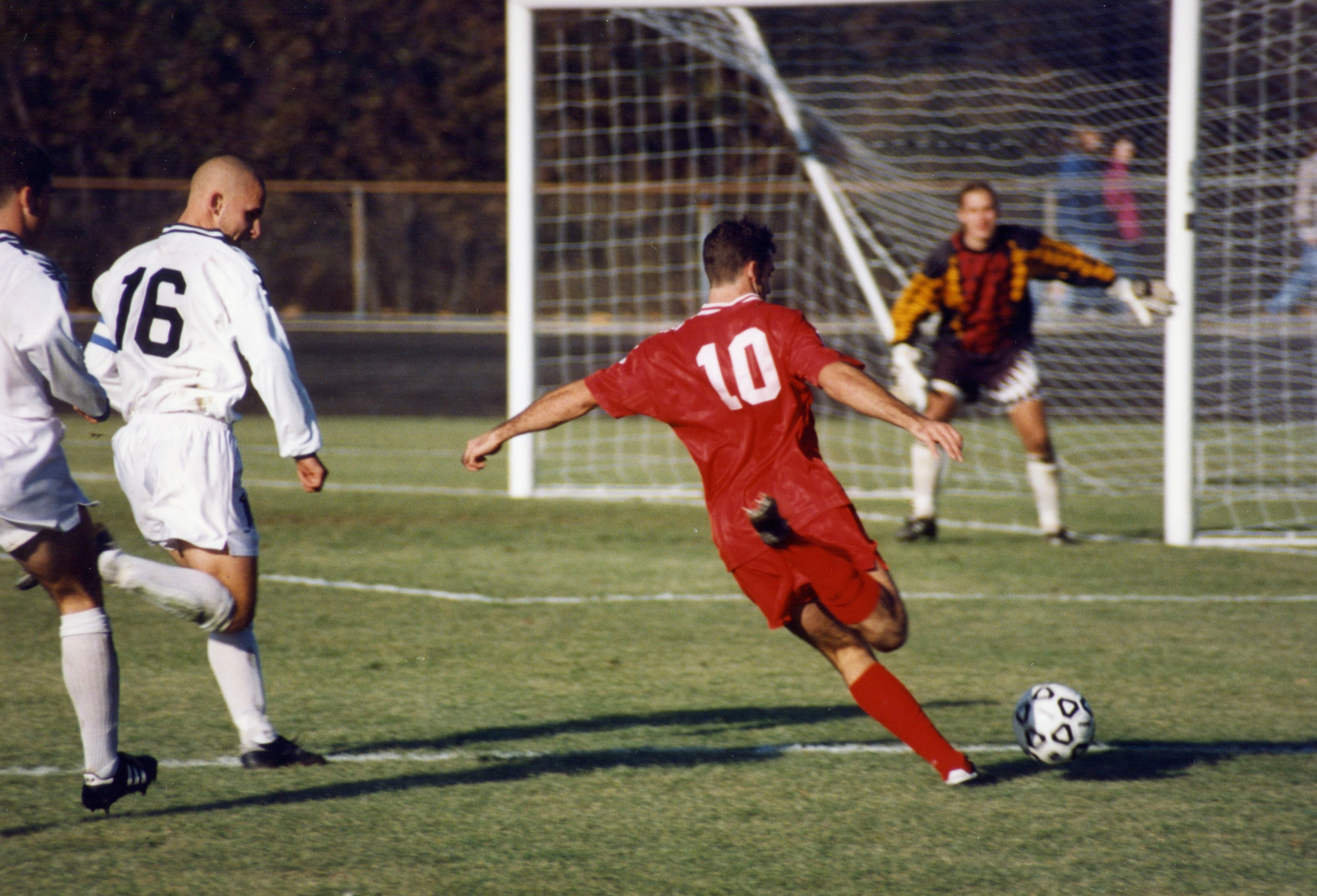
Association football (soccer)

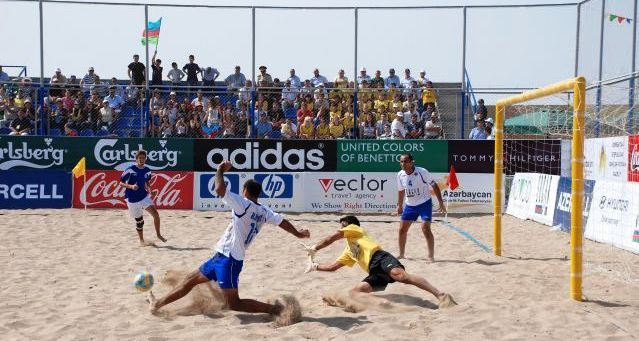
Association football (beach)

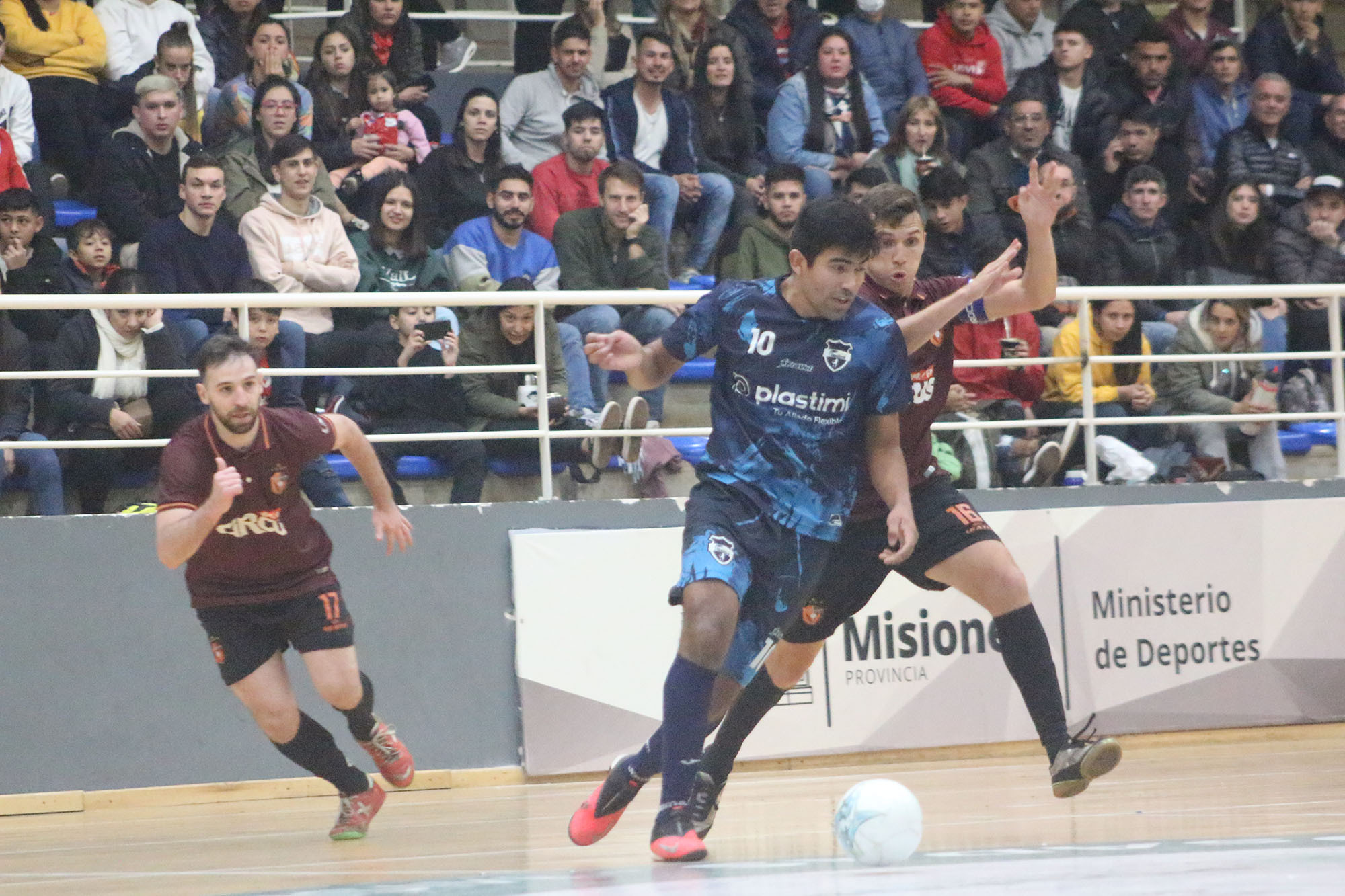
Association football (Futsal)

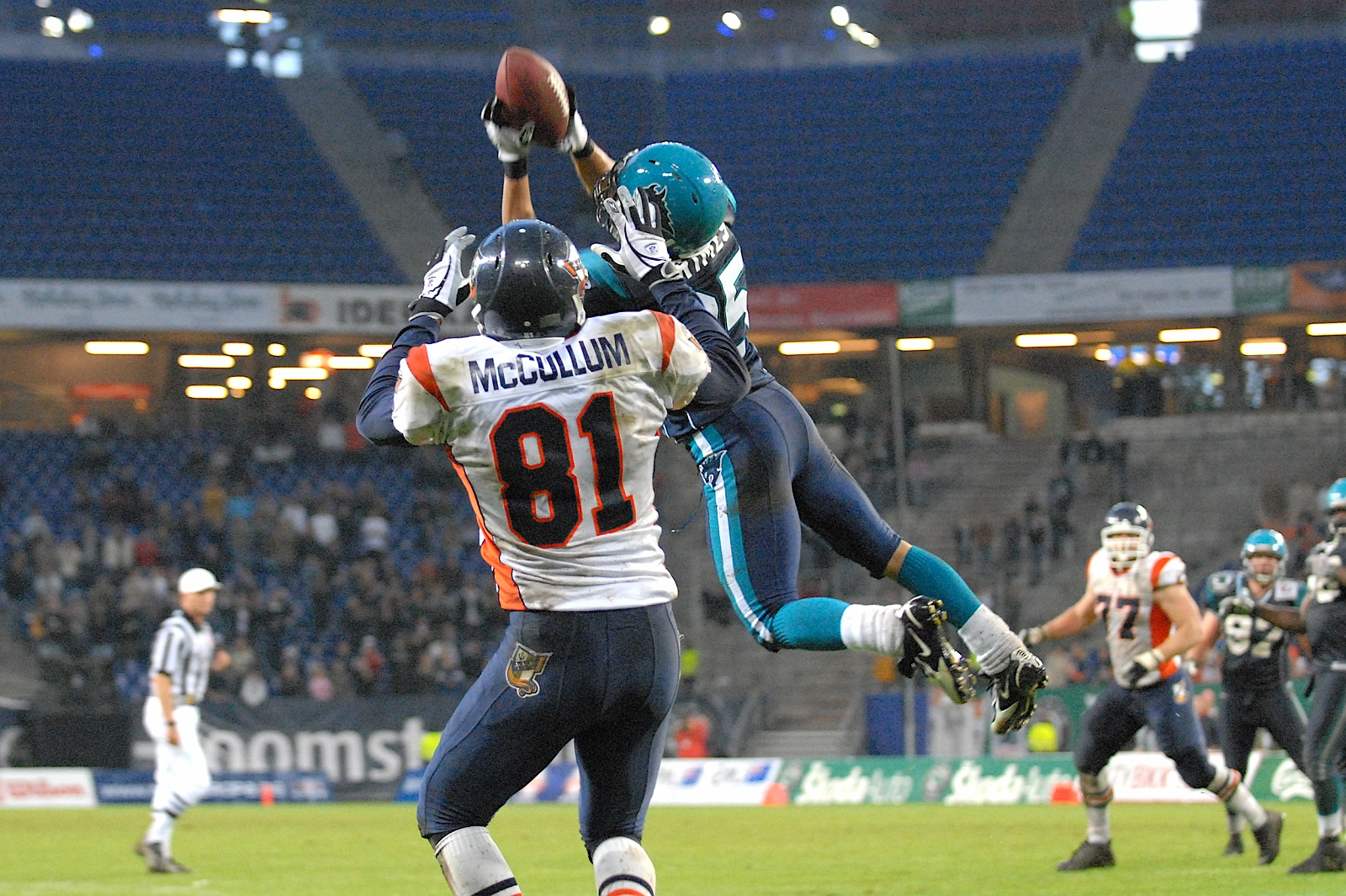
Gridiron football (American)

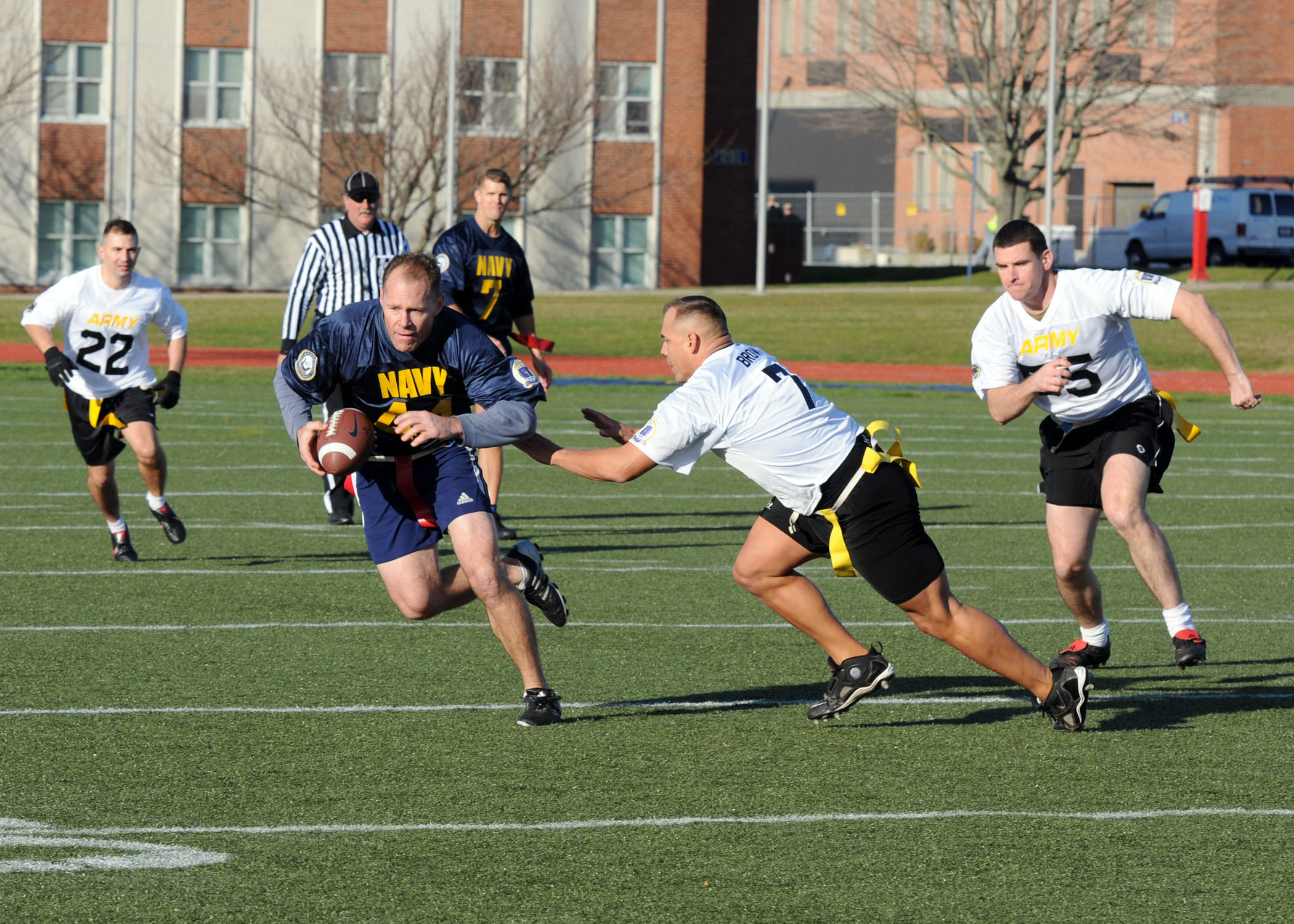
Gridiron football (Flag)

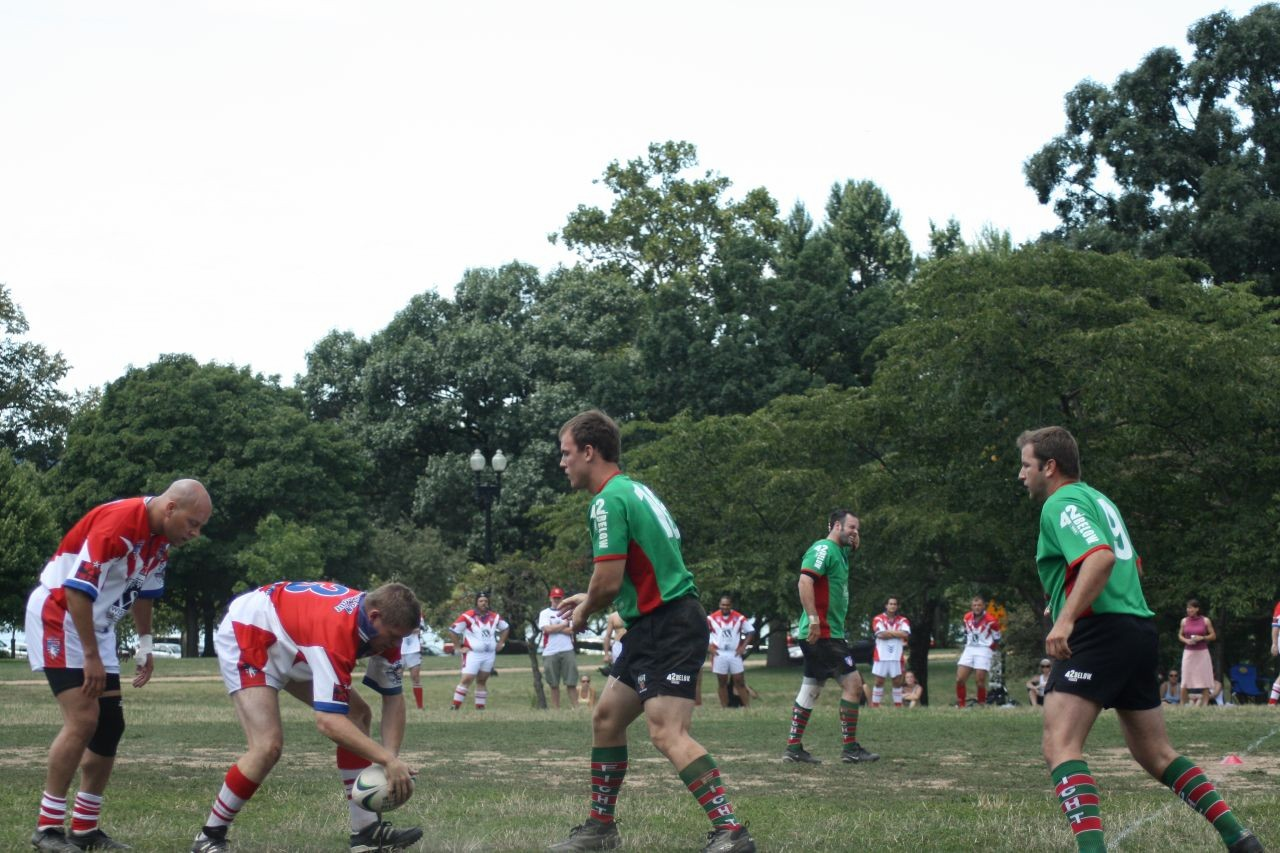
Rugby football (League)

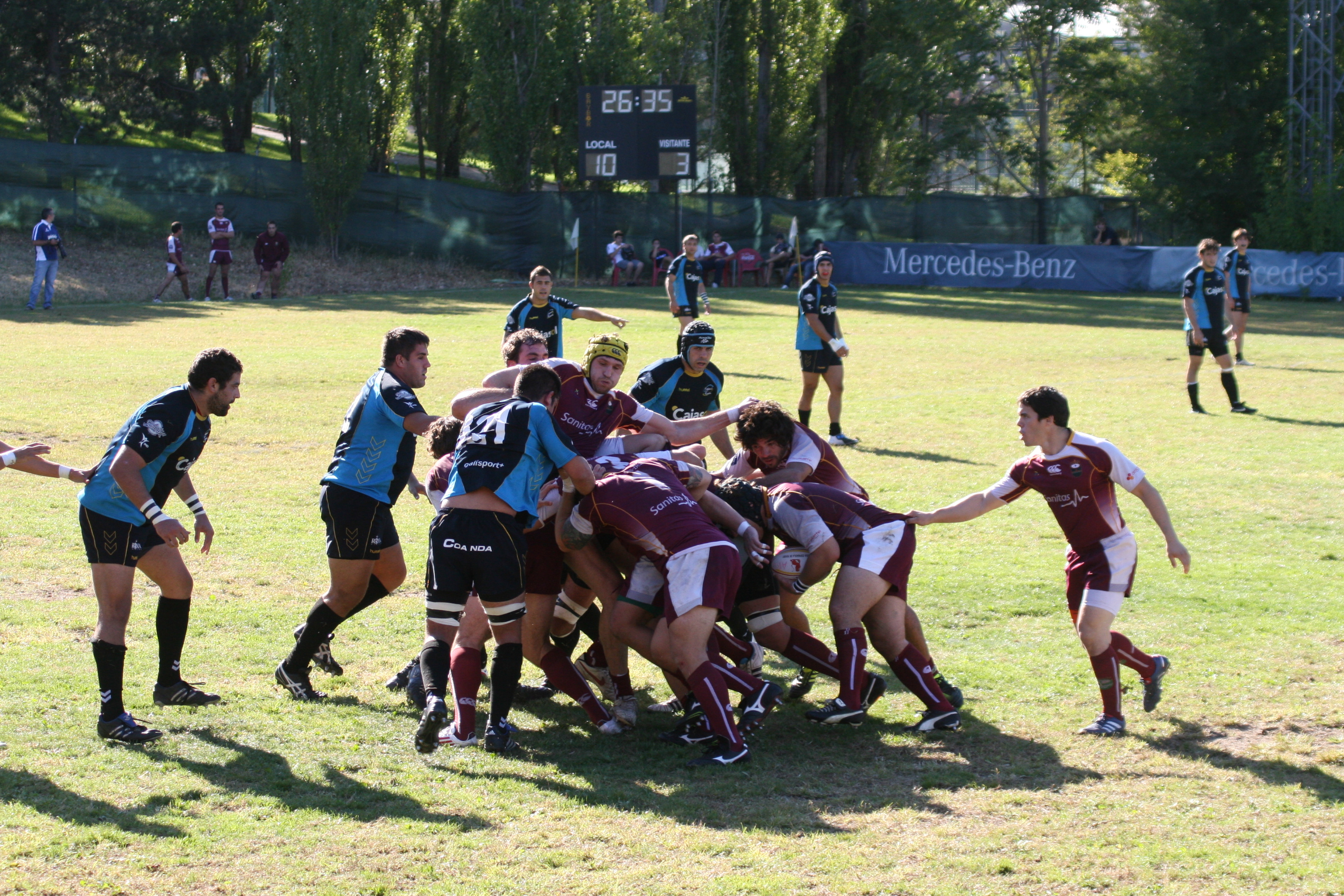
Rugby football (Union)

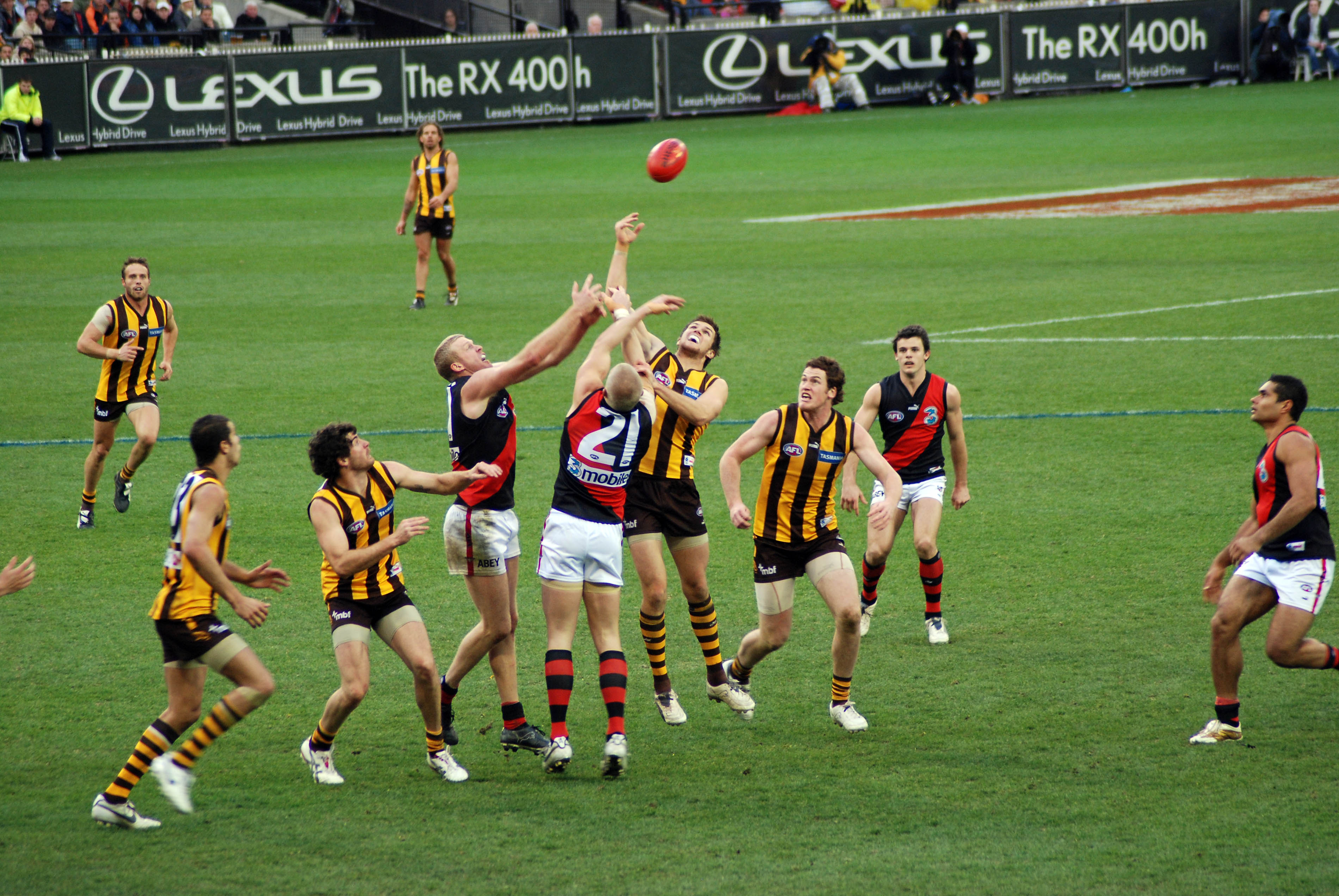
Australian rules football

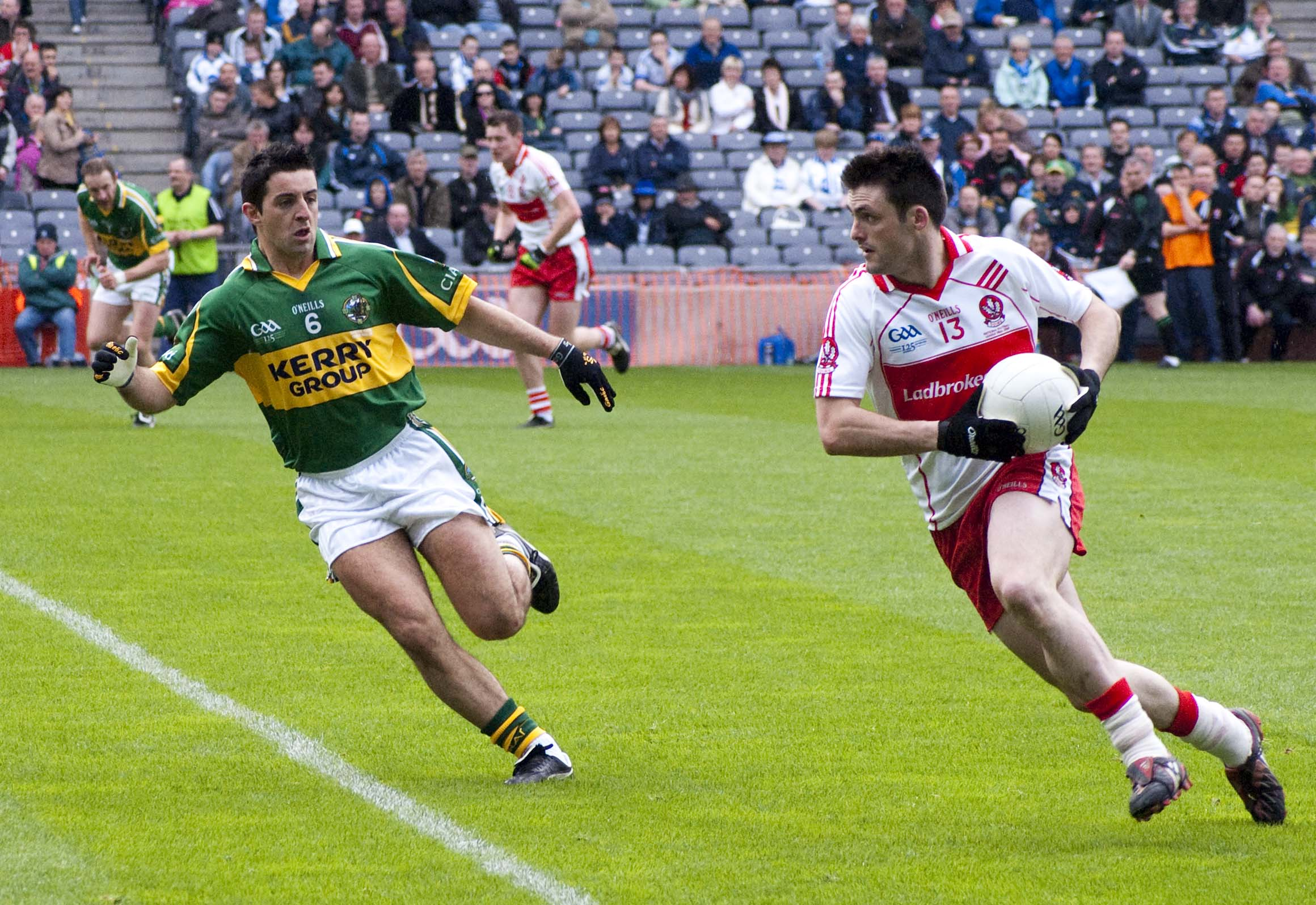
Gaelic football

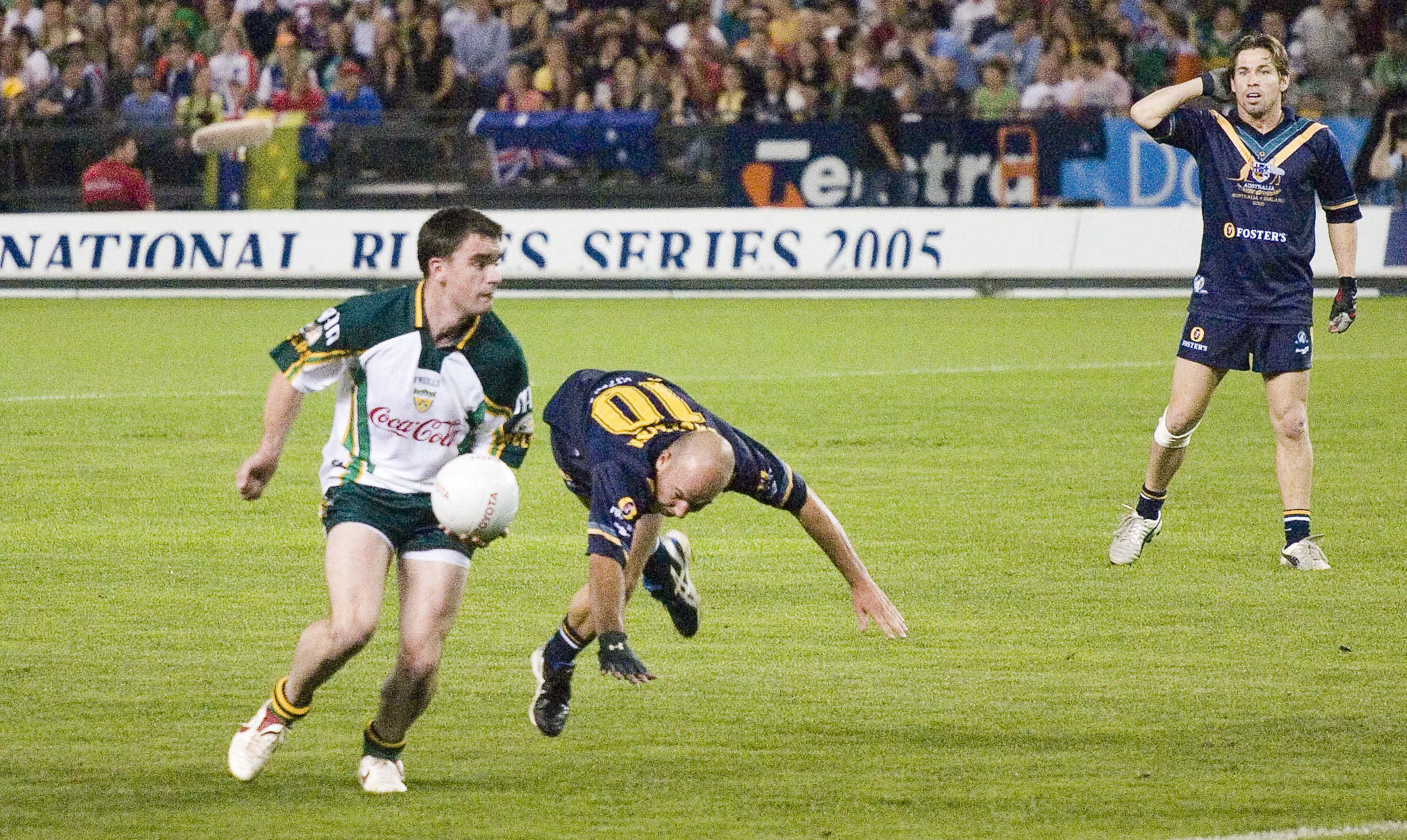
International rules football

Historical

- Ancient games
  - Aqsaqtuk
  - Chinlone
  - Cuju
  - Episkyros
  - Harpastum
  - Kemari
  - Ki-o-rahi
  - Marn Grook
  - Pasuckuakohowog
  - Phaininda
  - Tepuk
  - Woggabaliri
  - Yubi lakpi
- Medieval football
  - Ba game
    - Kirkwall Ba' Game
  - Bottle-kicking
  - Caid
  - Calcio Fiorentino
  - Camping (game)
  - Cnapan
  - Cornish hurling
  - Haxey Hood
  - Knattleikr
  - La soule
  - Lelo burti
  - Mob football
  - Shrove Tuesday games
    - Atherstone Ball Game
    - Royal Shrovetide Football
    - Scoring the Hales
    - Sedgefield Ball Game
    - Shrove Tuesday Football Ceremony of the Purbeck Marblers
  - Uppies and Downies
- English school games
  - Eton College
    - Field game
    - Wall game
  - Harrow football
  - Winchester College football

Modern codes

- Association football
  - Bubble football
  - Circle rules football
  - College soccer
  - Jorkyball
  - Old rules
    - Cambridge rules
    - Sheffield Rules
  - Paralympic football
    - Amputee football
    - Blind football
    - CP football
    - Wheelchair soccer
      - Powerchair Football
  - Reduced variants
    - 3v3 Soccer
    - Beach soccer
    - Cageball
    - Crab soccer
    - Fireball
    - Five-a-side football
    - Futsal
    - Ice football
    - Indoor soccer
    - Masters Football
    - Minifootball
    - Papi fut
    - Roller soccer
    - Rush goalie
    - Seven-a-side football
      - Kings League
      - Sevens football
    - Socca
    - Walking football
  - Street football
    - Keepie uppie
      - Freestyle football
      - Hacky sack
  - Swamp football
  - Three sided football
    - Omegaball
  - Women's association football
- Rugby football
  - Rugby league
    - Masters Rugby League
    - Mod league
    - Non tackle variants
      - American flag rugby
      - League tag
      - OzTag
      - Tag rugby
      - Touch rugby league
    - Reduced variants
      - Rugby league nines
      - Rugby league sevens
    - Wheelchair rugby league
    - Women's rugby league
  - Rugby union
    - Barette
    - Beach rugby
    - Mini rugby
    - Non tackle variants
      - Tag rugby
        - Tambo rugby
      - Touch rugby
    - Reduced variants
      - Rugby sevens
        - Rugby X
      - Rugby tens
    - Snow rugby
    - Student rugby union
    - Women's rugby union
  - Underwater rugby
  - Wheelchair rugby
  - Gridiron football
    - American football
      - Non tackle variants
        - Flag football
          - College flag football
        - Touch american football
      - Reduced variants
        - Eight-man football
        - Arena football
        - Nine-man football
        - Six-man football
      - College american football
      - High school American football
      - Sprint football
      - Street football (American)
      - Unicycle football
      - Wheelchair american football
      - UFL rules football (2024)
    - Canadian football
    - Underwater football
    - Women's gridiron football
- Australian football
  - AFLX
  - Auskick
  - Footy 9s
  - Kick-to-kick
  - Lightning football
  - Metro footy
  - Nine-a-side footy
  - Rec footy (no tackle allowed)
  - Wheelchair Australian rules football
  - Women's Australian rules football
- Gaelic football
  - Ladies' Gaelic football
  - Sevens
- Hybrid codes
  - Austus
  - Boston game
  - Forceback
  - Freeflyball
  - Fullball
  - International rules football
  - Kronum
  - Samoa rules
  - Speedball
  - Swedish football
  - Universal football
  - Vertiball
  - Volata

==== Handball ====
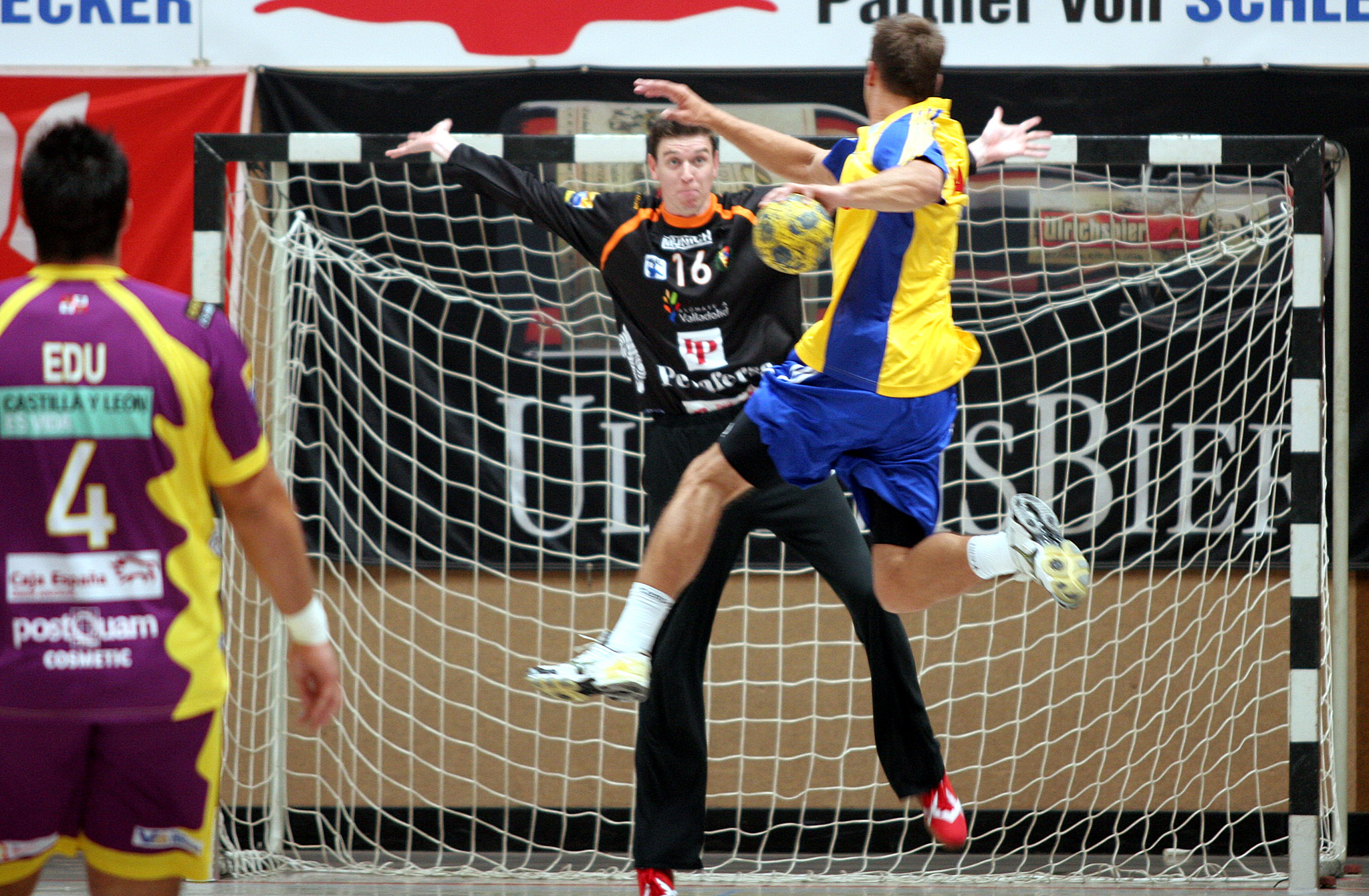
Indoor handball

- Czech handball
- Field handball
  - Indoor handball
    - Beach handball
    - Wheelchair handball
    - One goal 4x4
- Rollball
- Visual impaired
  - Goalball
  - Torball
- Water polo
  - Inner tube water polo
  - Beach water polo

==== Stick and Ball ====
Sports that use some kind of sticks for scoring goals.

- Bando

===== Hockey =====
Main hockey variants

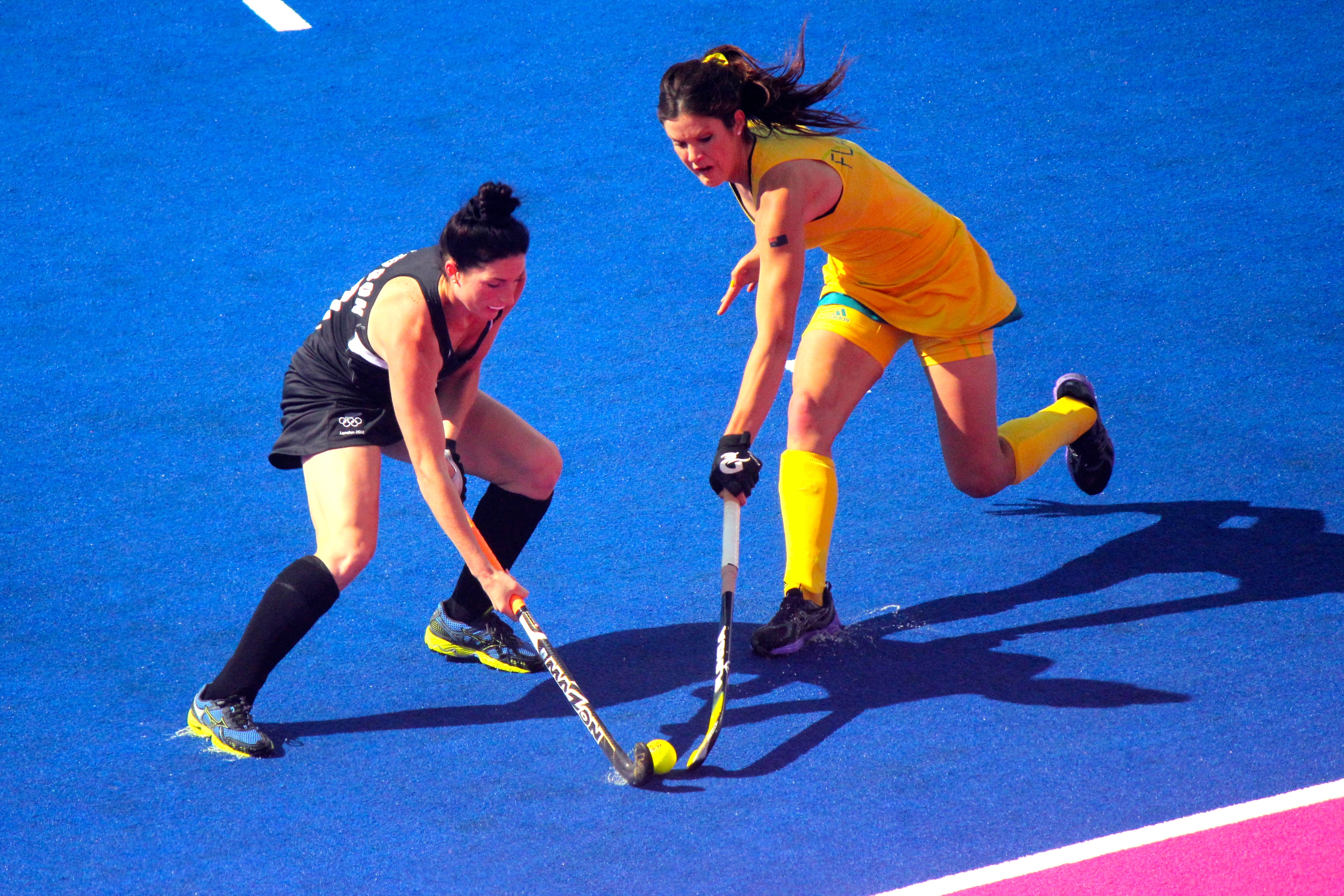
Field hockey

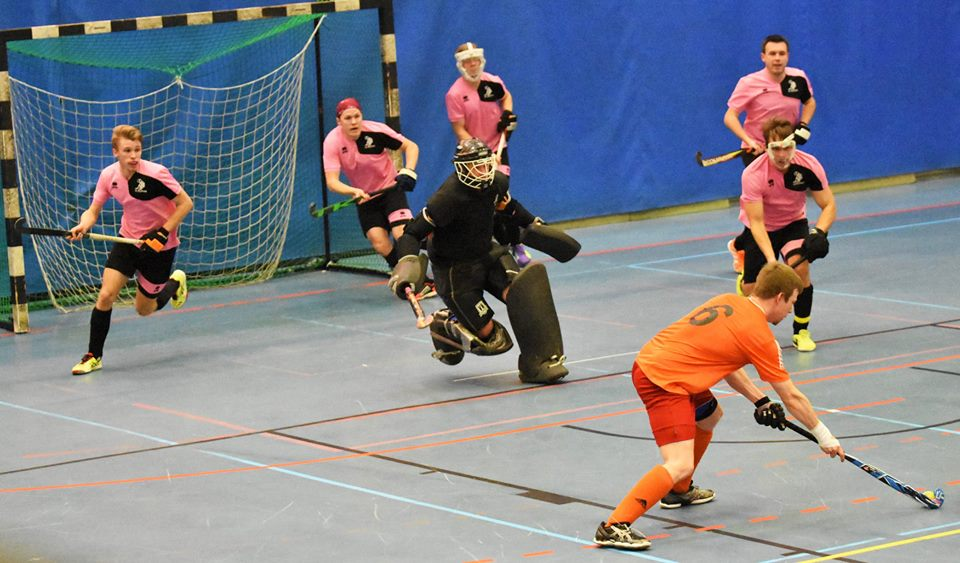
Indoor hockey

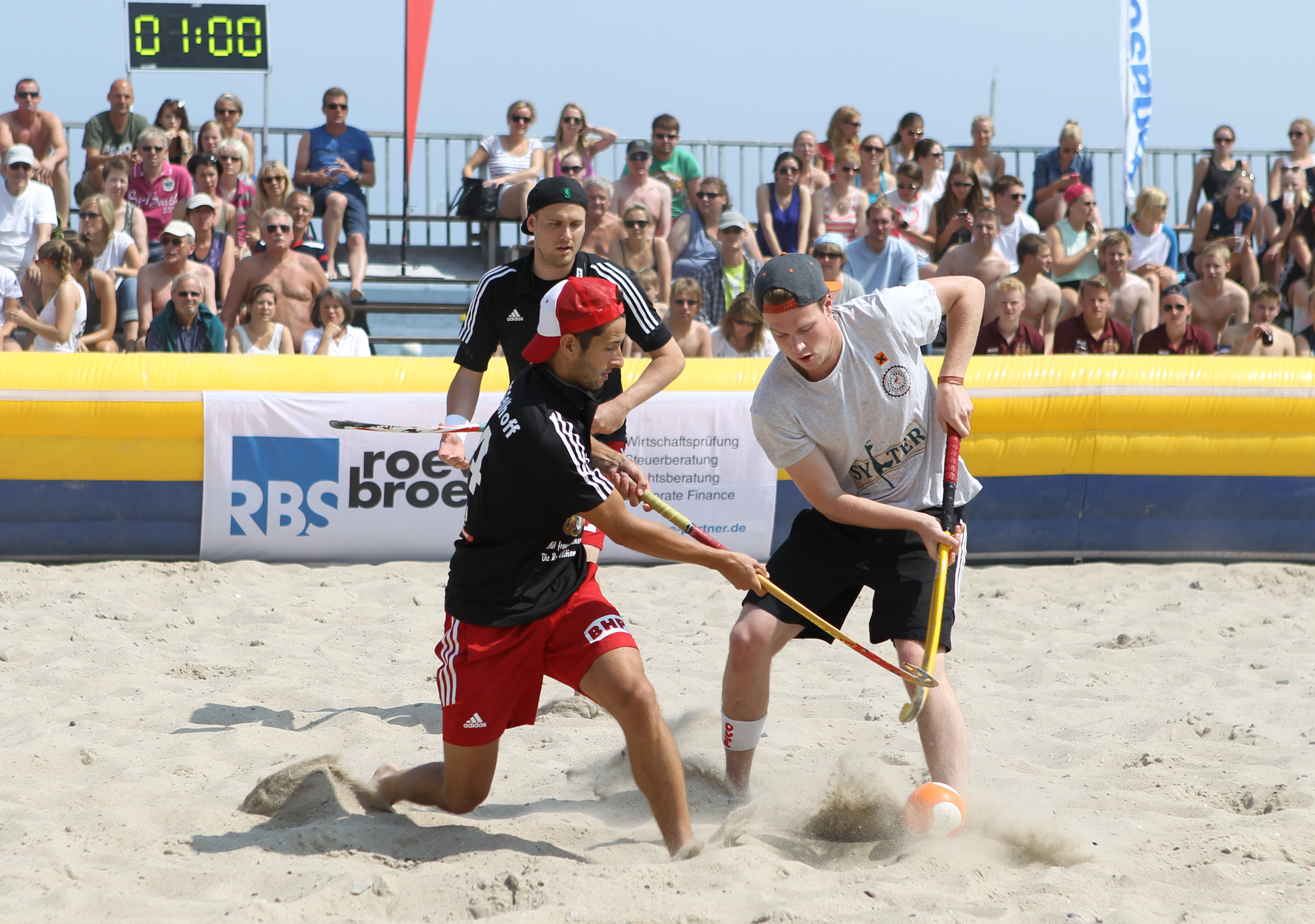
Beach hockey

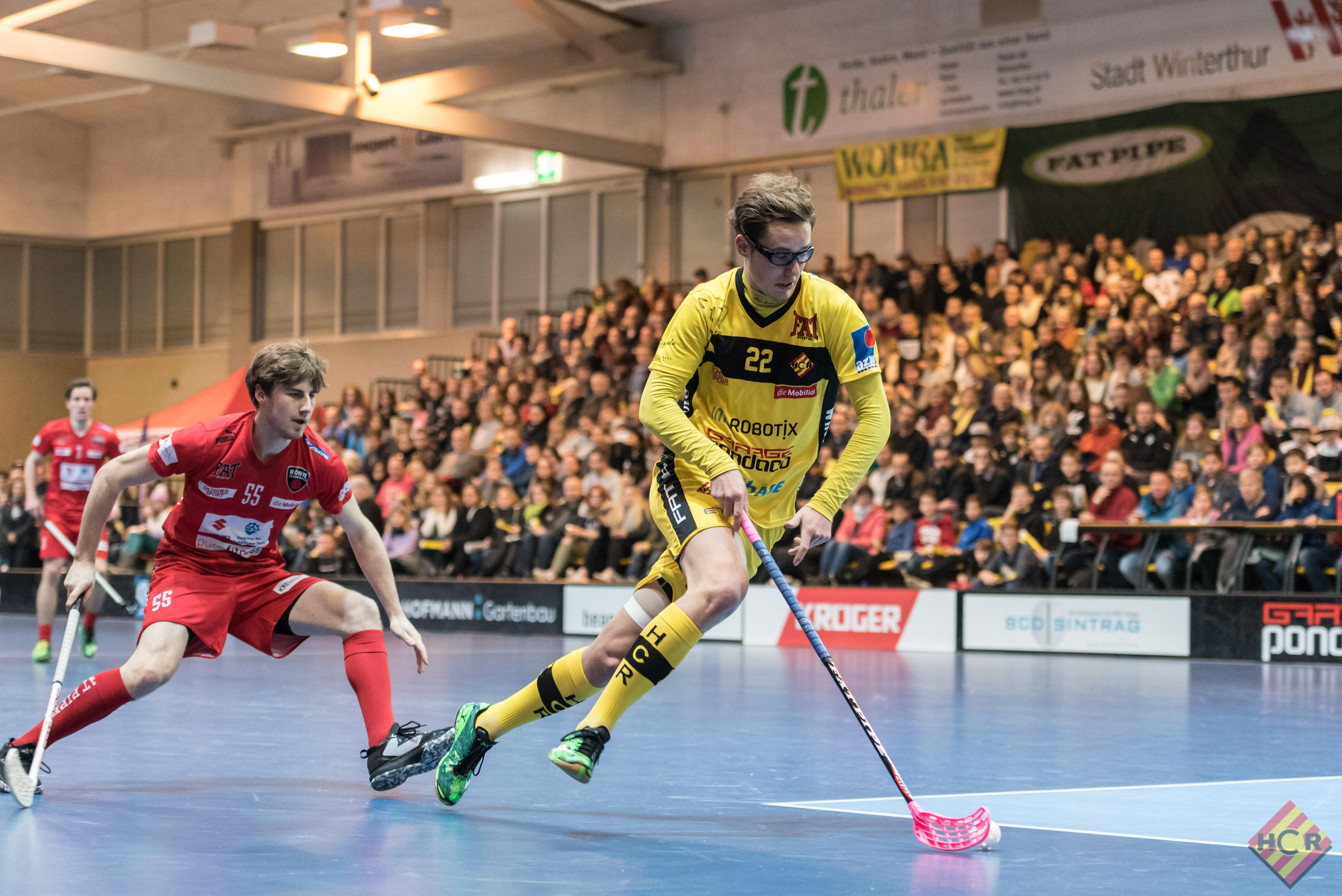
Floorball

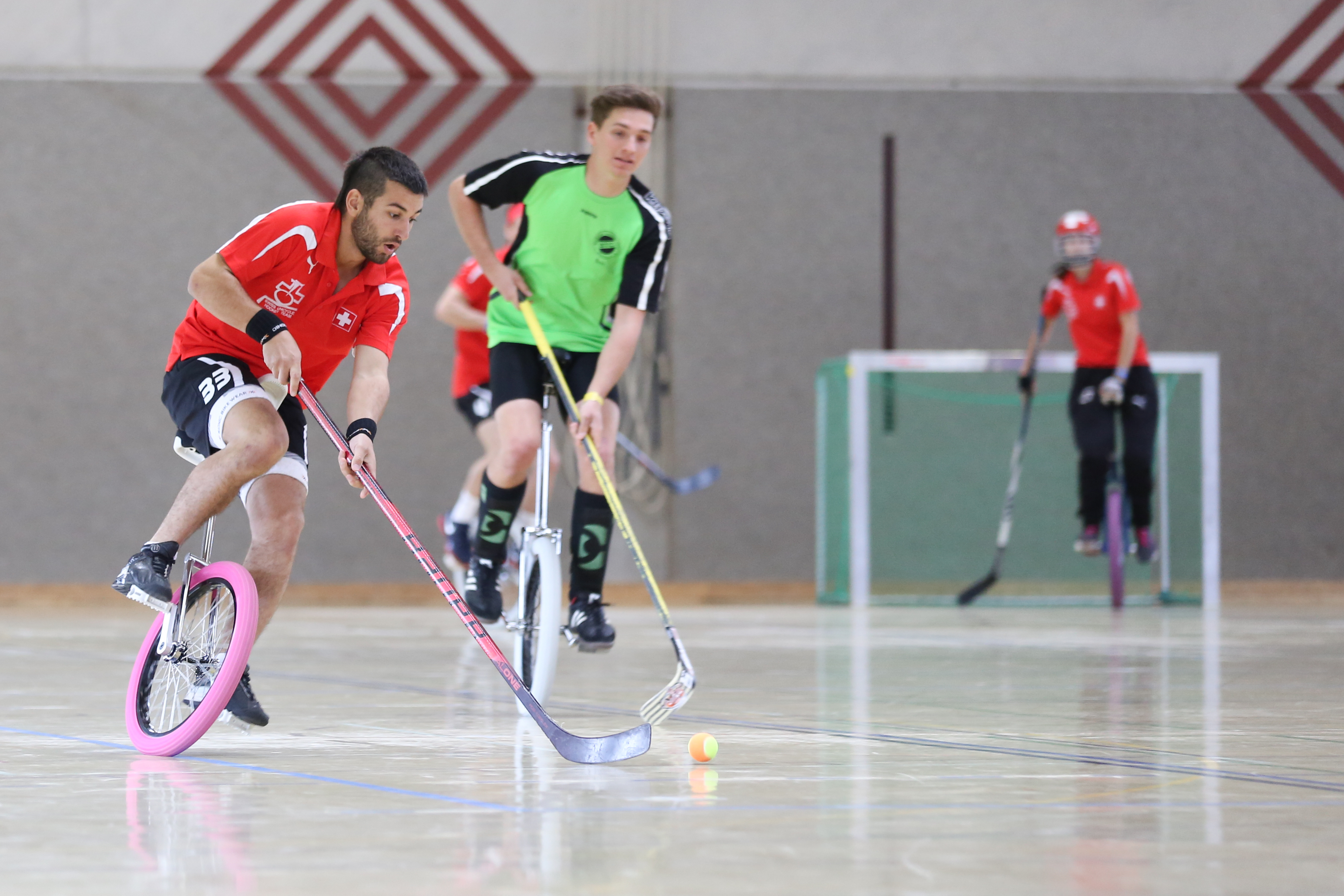
Unicycle hockey

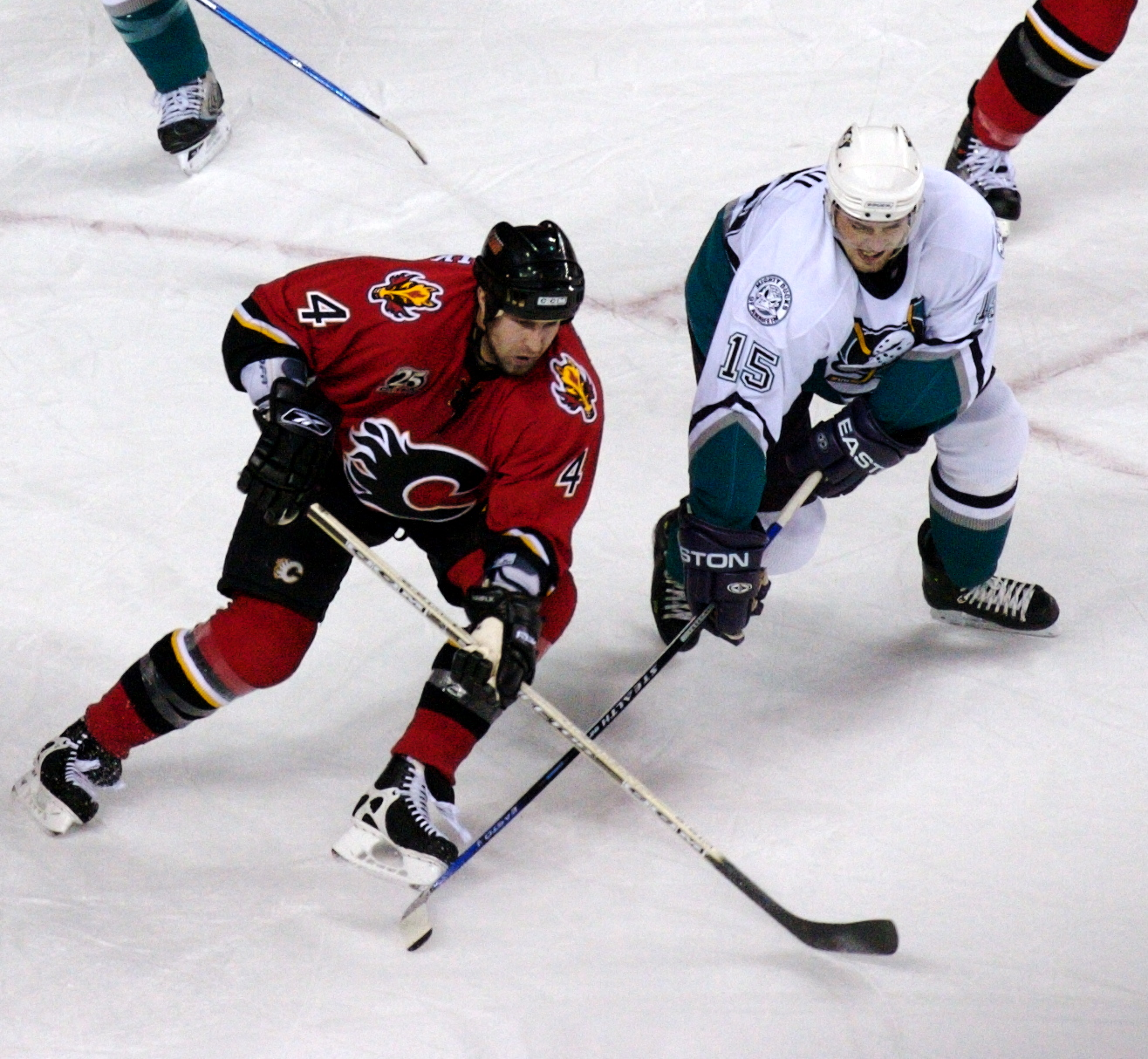
Ice hockey

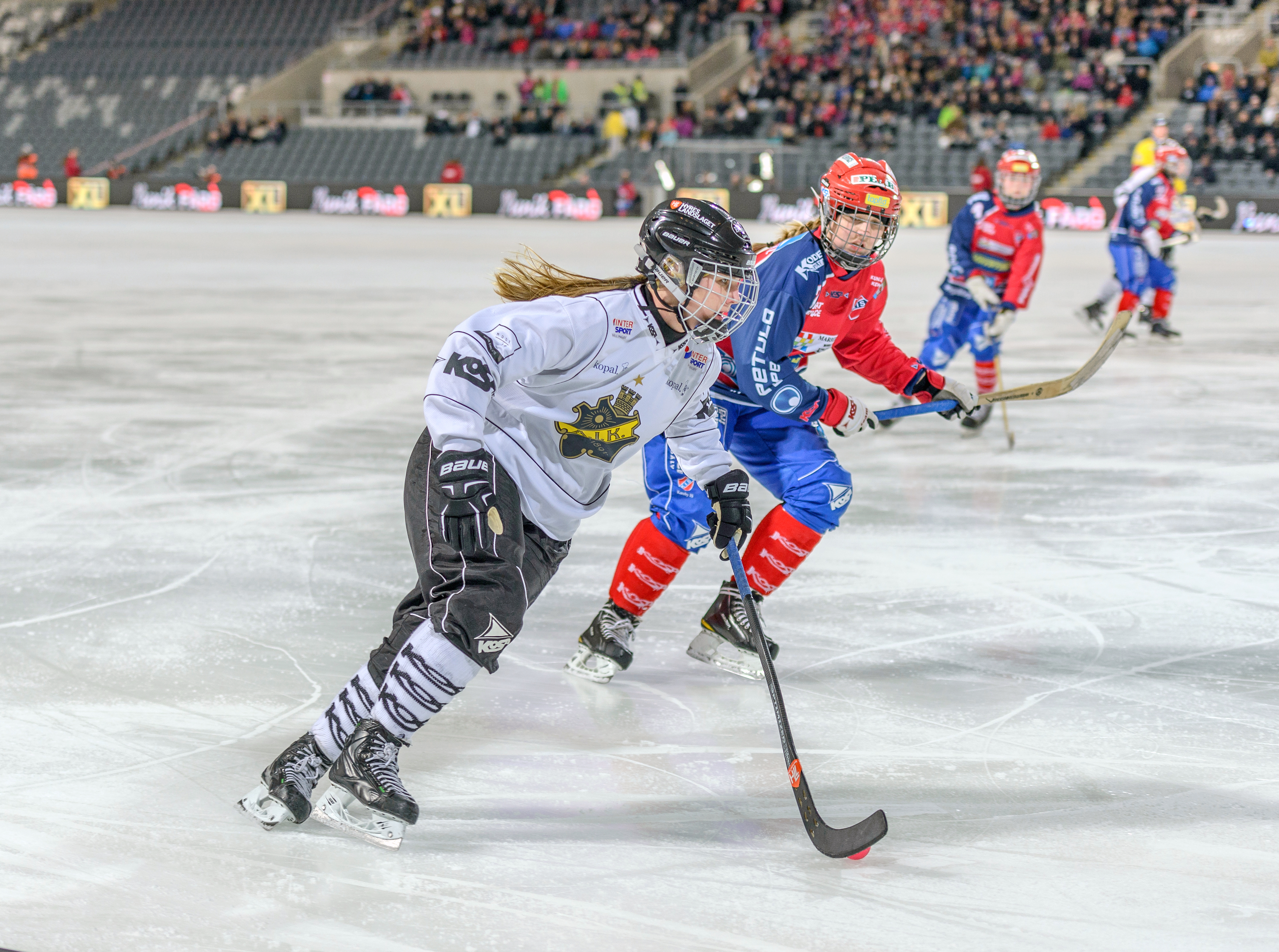
Bandy

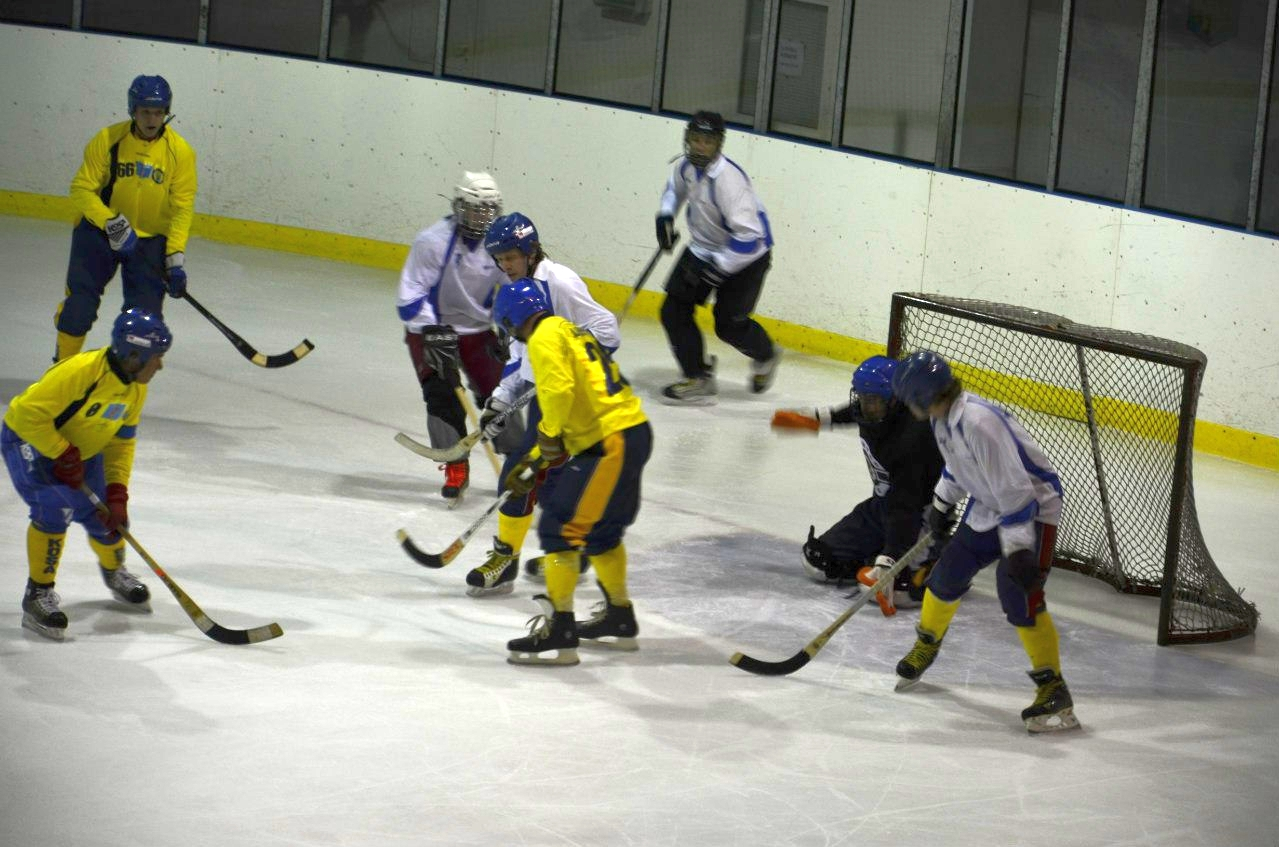
Bandy (Rink)

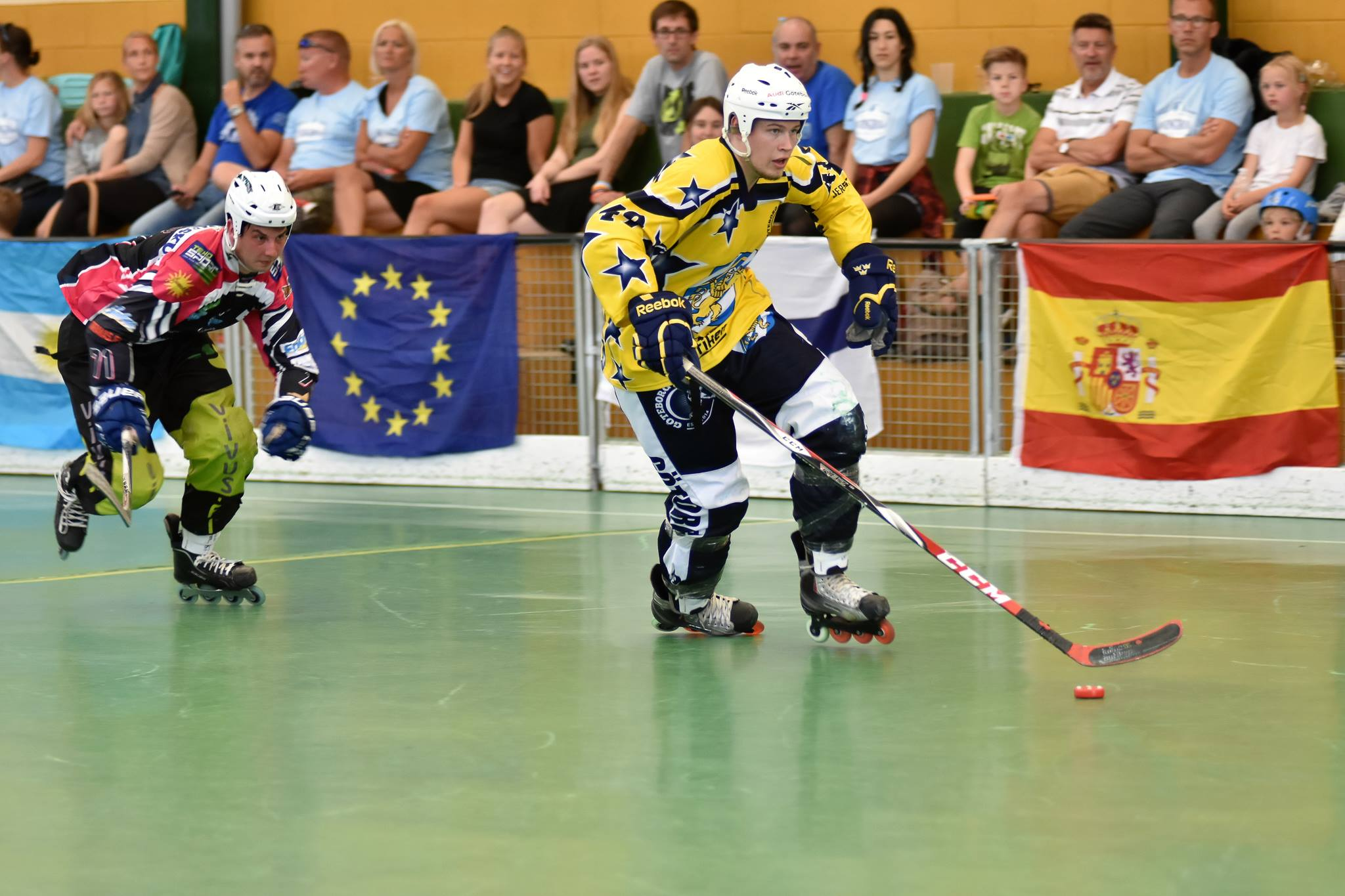
Roller hockey (inline)

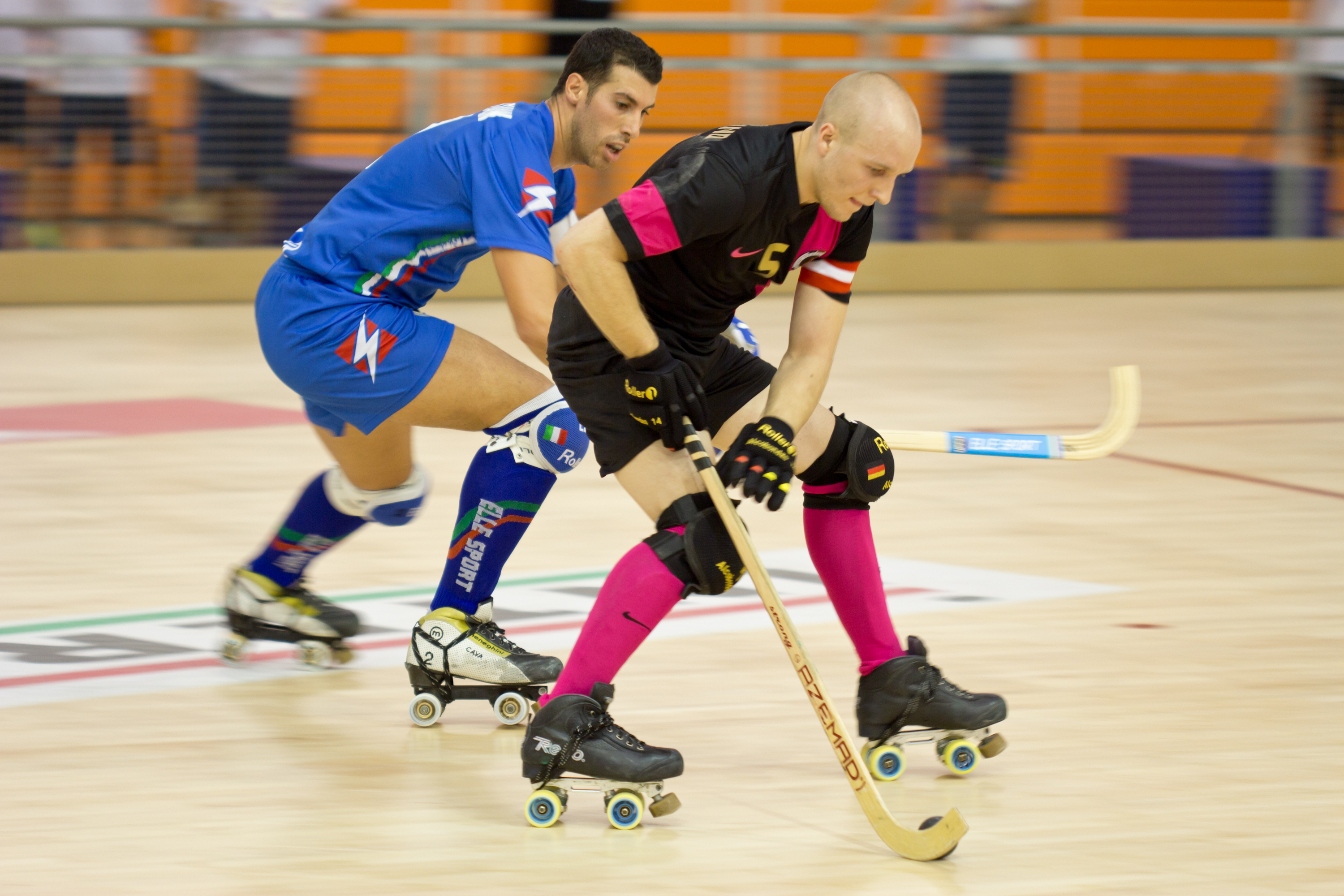
Roller hockey (quad)

- Traditional/historic
  - Beikou
  - Chueca
  - Khong kangjei
  - Palin
  - Pelota purépecha
- Field hockey
  - Beach hockey
  - Hockey5s
  - Hockey 9s
  - Indoor hockey
  - Minkey
- Floor hockey
  - Ball hockey
  - Floorball
- Foot hockey
- Hoverboard hockey
- On ice
  - Ice skates
    - Bandy
      - Rink bandy
      - Rinkball
    - Ice hockey
      - Blind hockey
      - Pond hockey
      - Shinny
      - Sledge hockey
      - Special hockey
      - College ice hockey
    - Ringette
  - Sans skates
    - Broomball
      - Moscow broomball
    - Spongee
- Power hockey
- Ring-goal
- Roller hockey
  - Inline hockey
    - Blind inline hockey
    - Inline sledge hockey
  - Quad hockey
- Rossall Hockey
- Street hockey
- Ultiglockey
- Underwater
  - Underwater hockey
  - Underwater ice hockey
- Unicycle hockey

===== Hurling and shinty =====
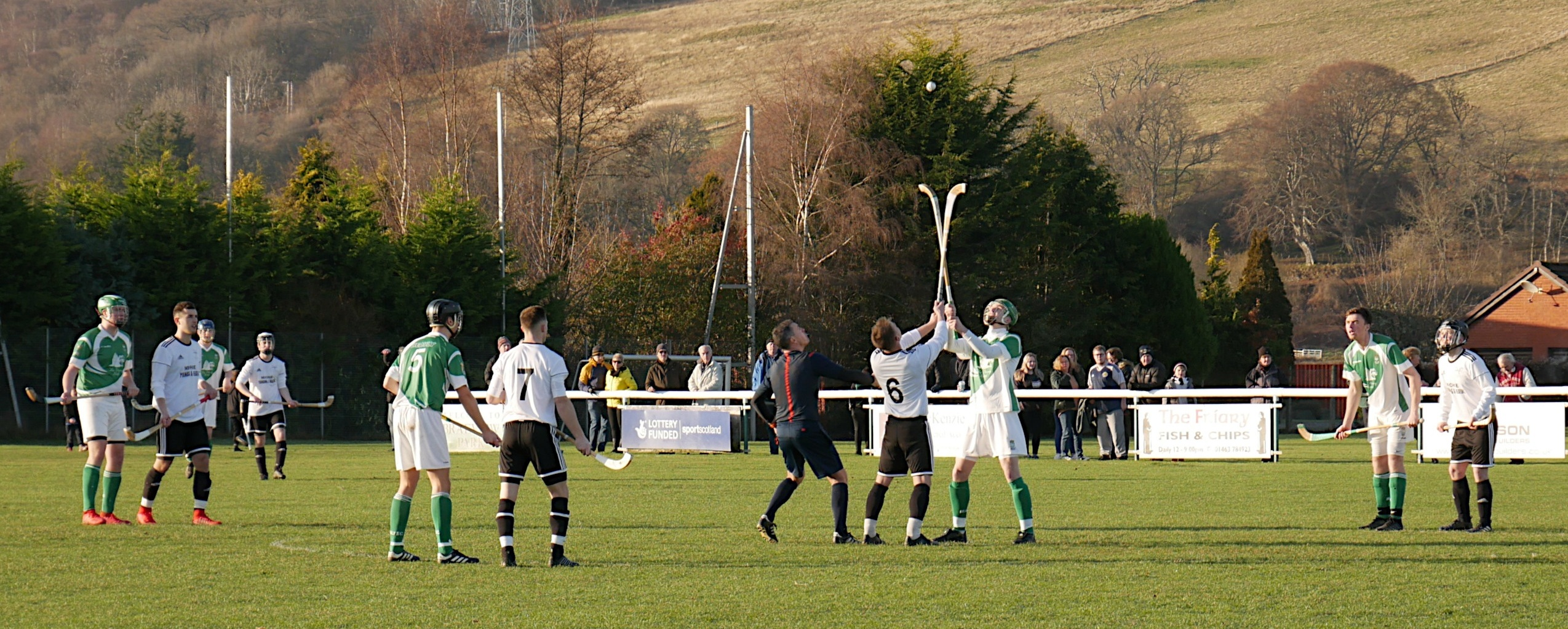
Shinty

- Cammag
- Hurling
  - Camogie
- Shinty
  - Women's shinty
- Composite rules shinty-hurling
  - Iomain

===== Lacrosse =====
Lacrosse variants

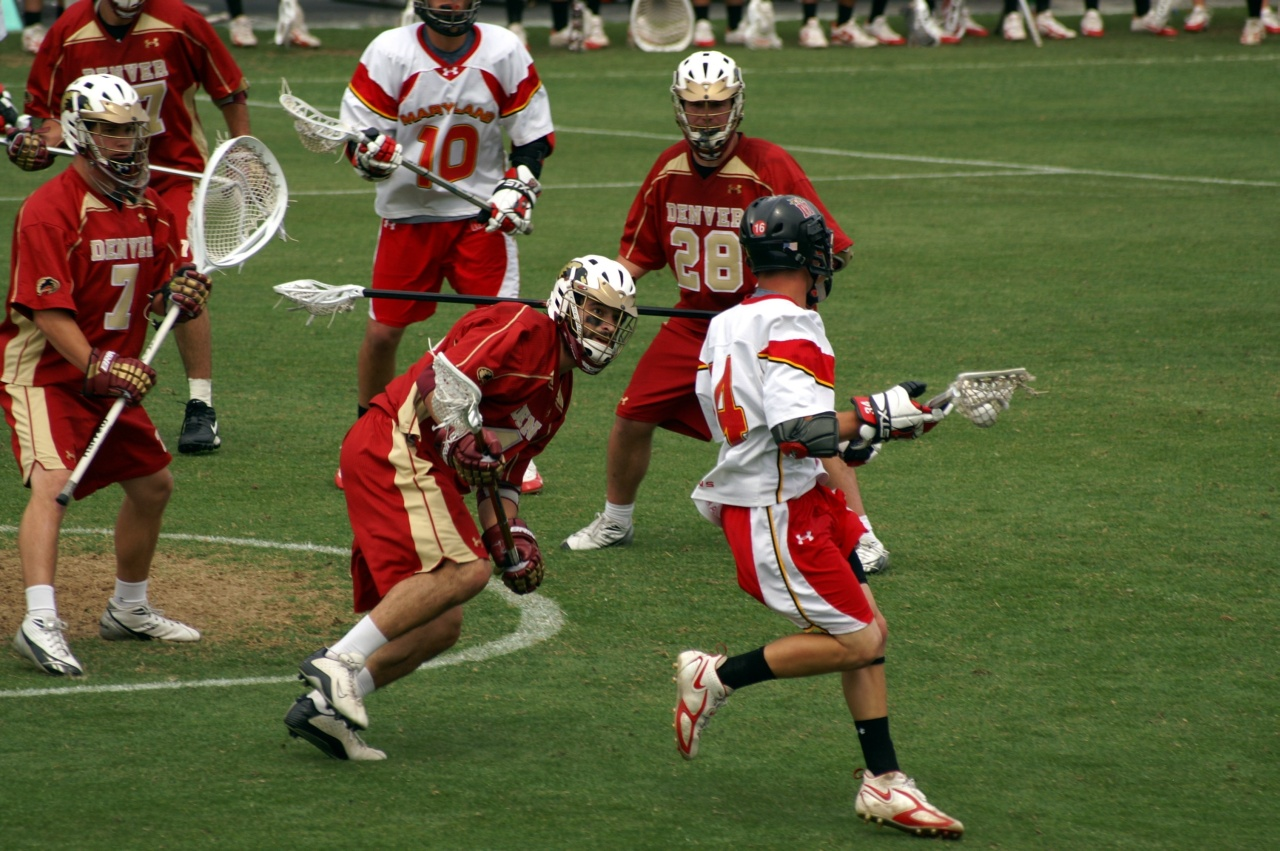
Field

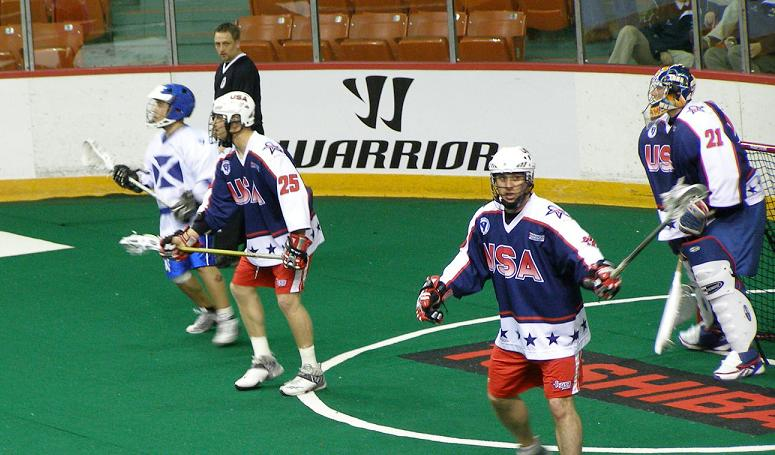
Box

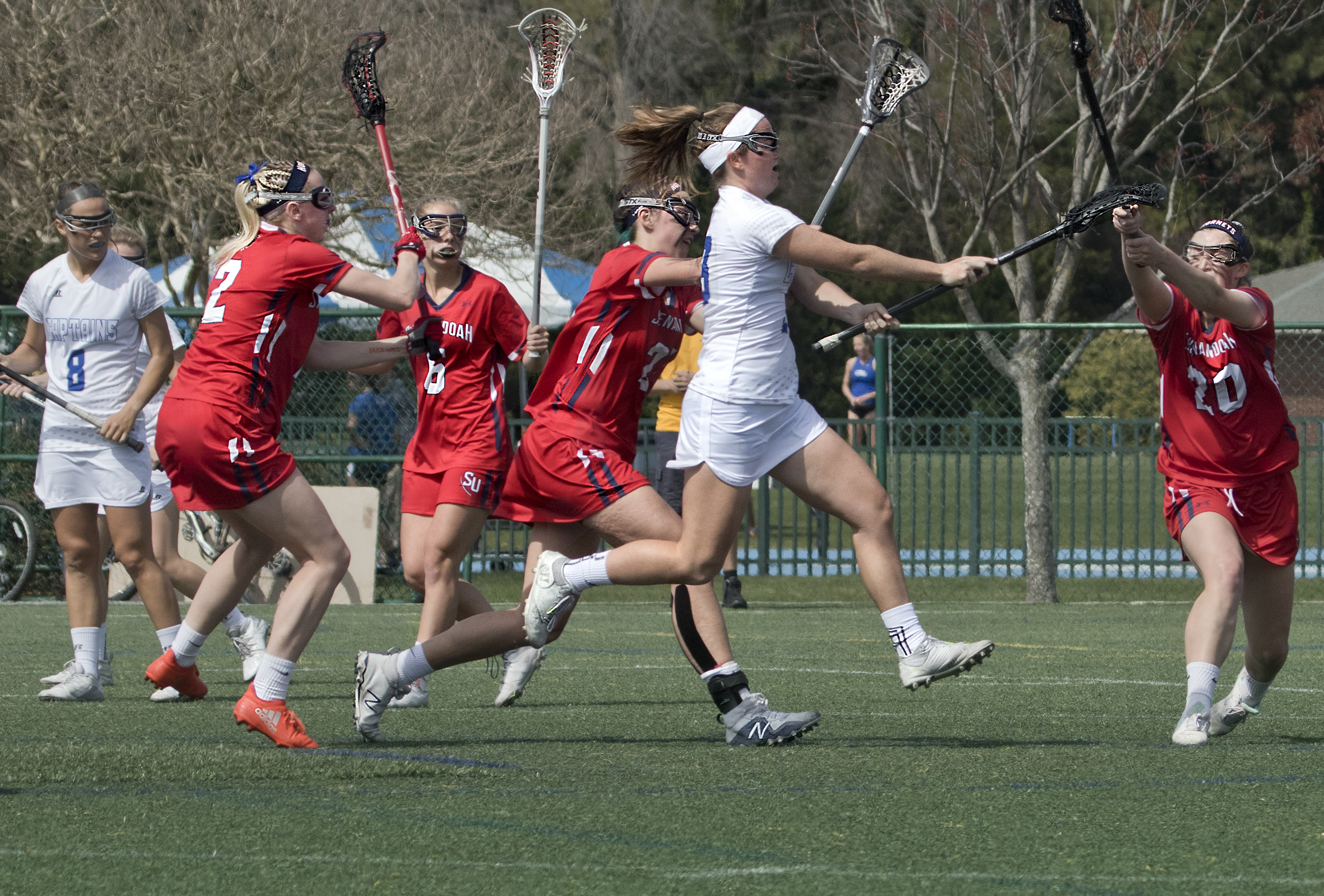
Women

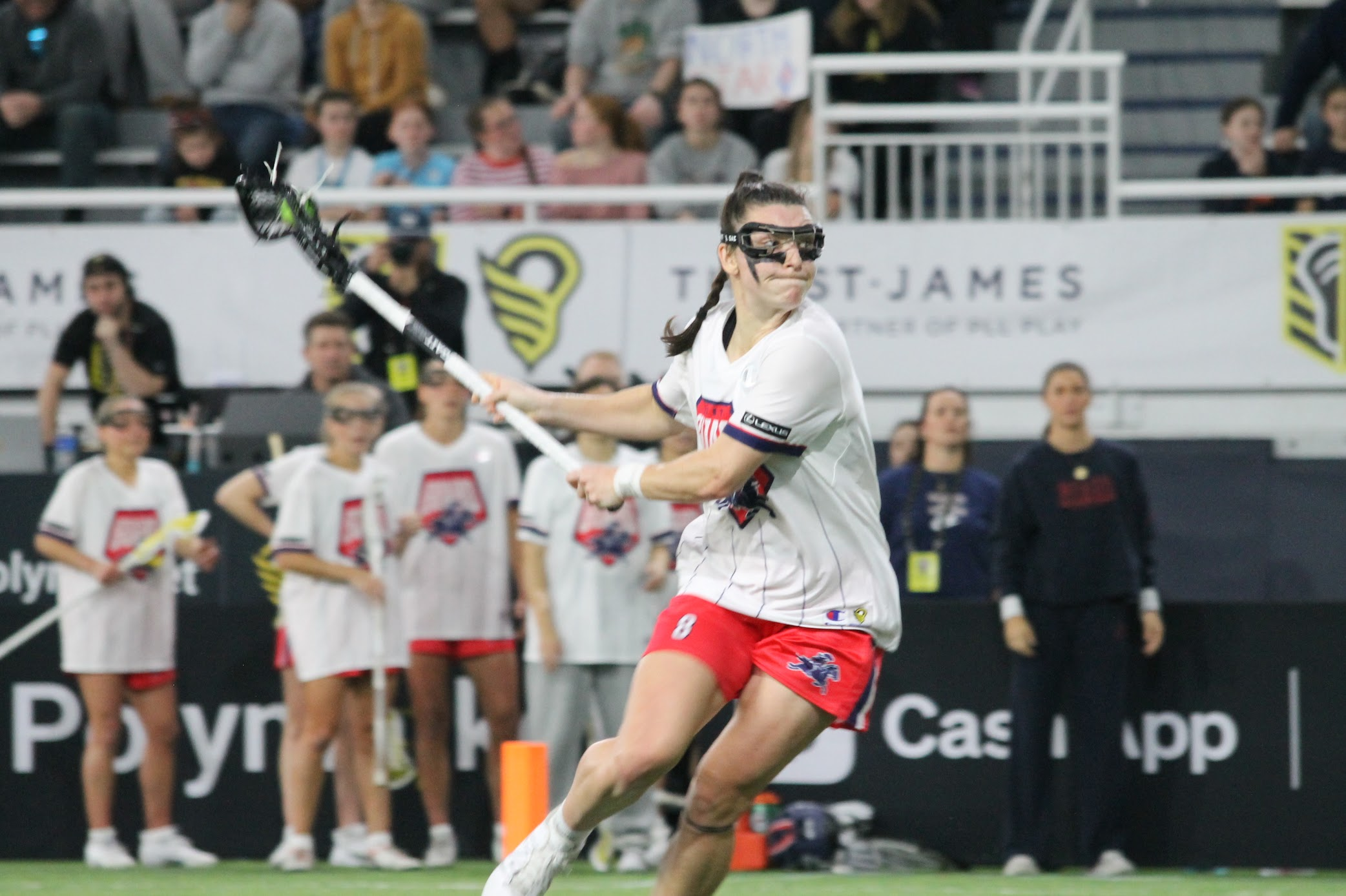
Sixes

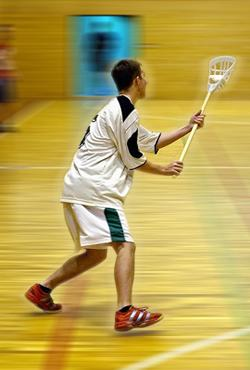
Pop

- Indigenous North American stickball
- Field lacrosse
  - Box lacrosse
  - Women's lacrosse
  - Lacrosse sixes
  - Intercrosse
  - Wheelchair lacrosse
  - College lacrosse
- Polocrosse
- Segway rugpolocrosse

===== Polo =====
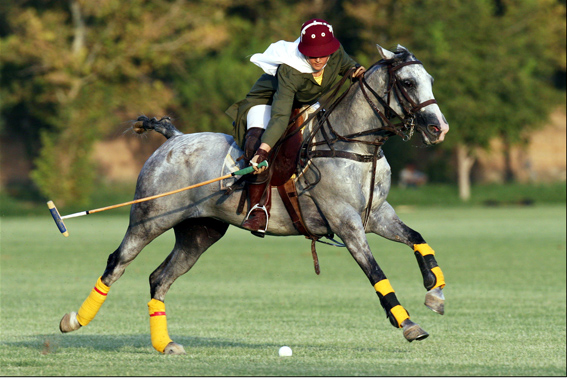
A polo player.

- Auto polo
- Chovgan
- Sagol kāngjei
- Arena polo
  - Beach polo
- Bicycle polo
  - Hardcourt Bike Polo
- Camel polo
- Cowboy polo
- Elephant polo
- Hobby horse polo
- Roda Polo
- Segway polo
- Snow polo
- Unicycle polo
- Yak polo

==== Other goal sports ====
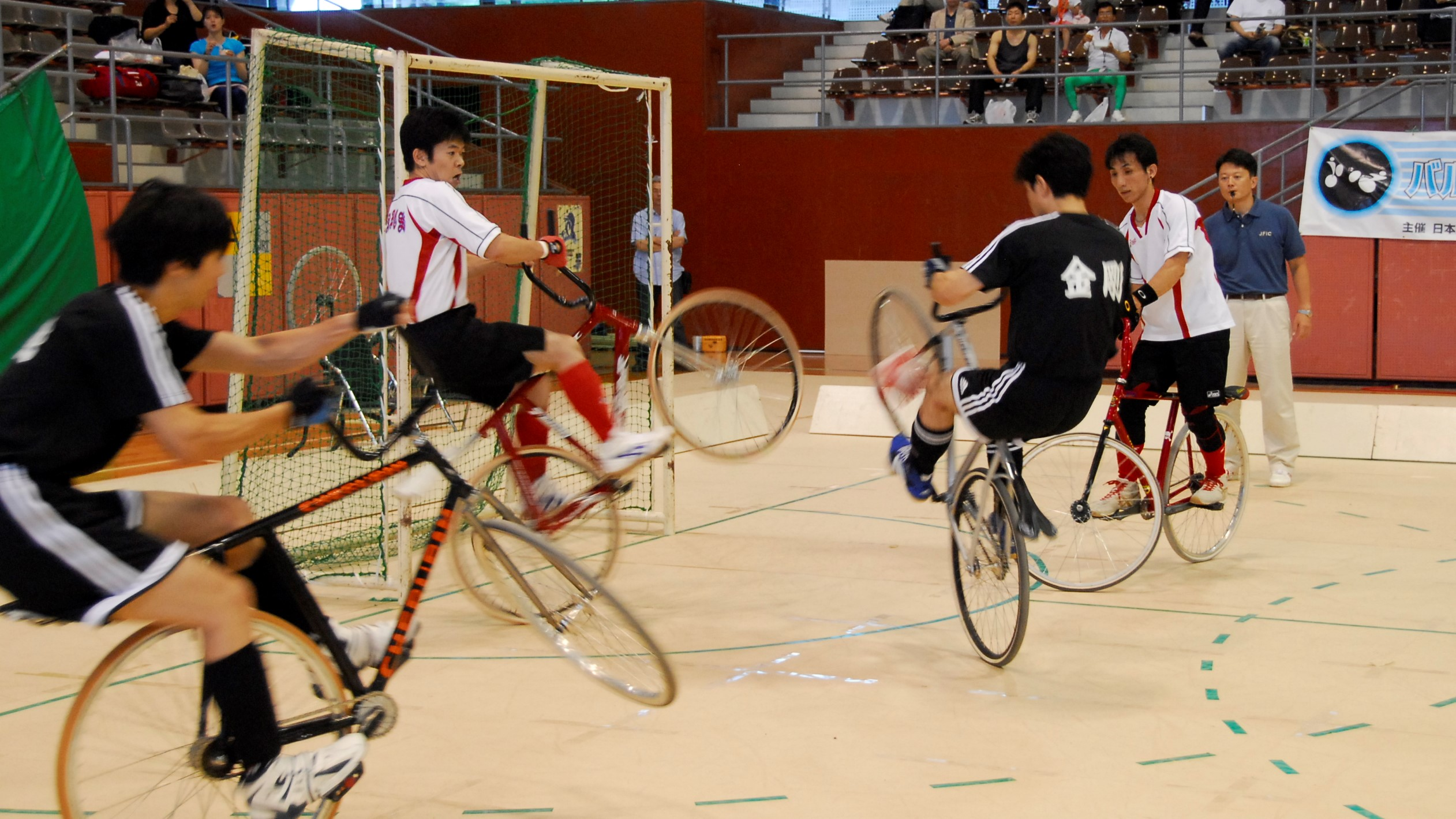
Cycle ball

- Anejodi
  - Angleball
- Autoball
- Cycleball
- Elephant football
- Foobaskill
- Home Ball
- Motoball
- Nashball
- Pearl ball
- Pushball
- Quidditch
- Tennis polo
- Treibball
- Whirlyball

=== Net and wall games ===
Sports when players/teams score whenever the opponent fails to return validly the possession of ball/bird back.

Games involving opponents hitting/throwing a ball over a net using a racket, or other piece of equipment, or merely the body:
Badminton; AirBadminton; Ball badminton; Para-badminton; Fistball; Footbag net; Football tennis; Jianzi; Jokgu; Jollyball; Loofball; Miniten; Peteca; Pickleball; Qianball; Rocball; Sepak takraw; Sipa; Table tennis; Hardbat; Headis; Para table tennis; Tambourelli; Te ano; Tennikoit; Tennis; Beach tennis; Deck tennis; Fast4 Tennis; Paddle tennis; Parasports; Adaptive Standing Tennis; Wheelchair tennis; Road tennis; Soft tennis; Sphairee; Team tennis; Tie Break Tens; Touchtennis; Turbo Tennis; Teqball; Teqvoly; Throwball; Volleyball; 9-man; Beach volleyball; Beach volleyball 4x4; Bossaball; Crossnet; Ecuavolley; Footvolley; Hooverball; Newcomb ball; Parasports; Sitting volleyball; Standing volleyball; Beach ParaVolley; Snow volleyball; Water volleyball; Biribol	Volleyball. Tennis
Games involving opponents hitting/throwing a ball against walls or any rebounding surface using a racket, or other piece of equipment, or merely the body:
360ball; Foot Table; Hemsball; Basque pelota; Frontball; Frontenis; Jai alai; Paleta frontón; Downside ball game; Paddle ball; Four wall paddleball; One wall paddleball; Rackets; Racquetball; Roundnet; Squash; Squash Doubles; Hardball squash; Squash tennis; Women squash; Tchoukball; Wallball; American handball; Australian handball; Butts Up; Chinese handball; Downball; Fives; Eton fives; Rugby fives; Gaelic handball; One-wall handball; Patball; Suicide (game); Valencian frontó; Wallball (children's game); Welsh handball	A game of squash One-wall handball
Games that use both walls and net:
Escala i corda; Jeu de paume; Real Tennis; Padbol; Padel; Platform tennis; Squalleyball; Squash-volleyball; Stické; Table squash; Wallyball	Padbol
Games that use neither walls nor net:
Chaza; Crossminton (previously "Speedminton" or "Speed badminton"); Four square; Russian four square; Frisian handball; Gain-ground; Balle à la main; Ballon au poing; International game; Longue paume; Kin-Ball; Nadan panthu kali; Speed-ball; Tamburello; Tipong; Totem tennis	Crossminton

==== Pilota family ====
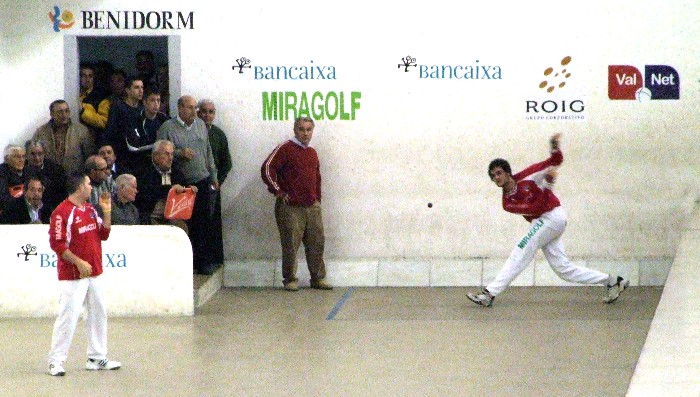
Valencian pilota.

- American handball
- Australian handball
- Basque pelota
  - Jai alai
- Chaza
- Downball
- Fives
  - Eton fives
  - Rugby fives
- Frisian handball
- Four square or FS Handball
- Gaelic handball
- Gain-ground
  - Balle à la main
  - Ballon au poing
  - International game
  - Llargues
- Jeu de paume
  - Longue paume
- One-wall handball
- Palla
- Pallone
  - Tamburello
    - Tambourelli
- Patball
- Roundnet
- Schoolyard handball
- Valencian pilota
  - Escala i corda
  - Galotxa
  - Raspall
  - Valencian frontó
- Welsh handball

==== Racket (or racquet) sports ====
- Racketlon (a series of other racket and paddle sports)

===== Sports that use a netted racket =====
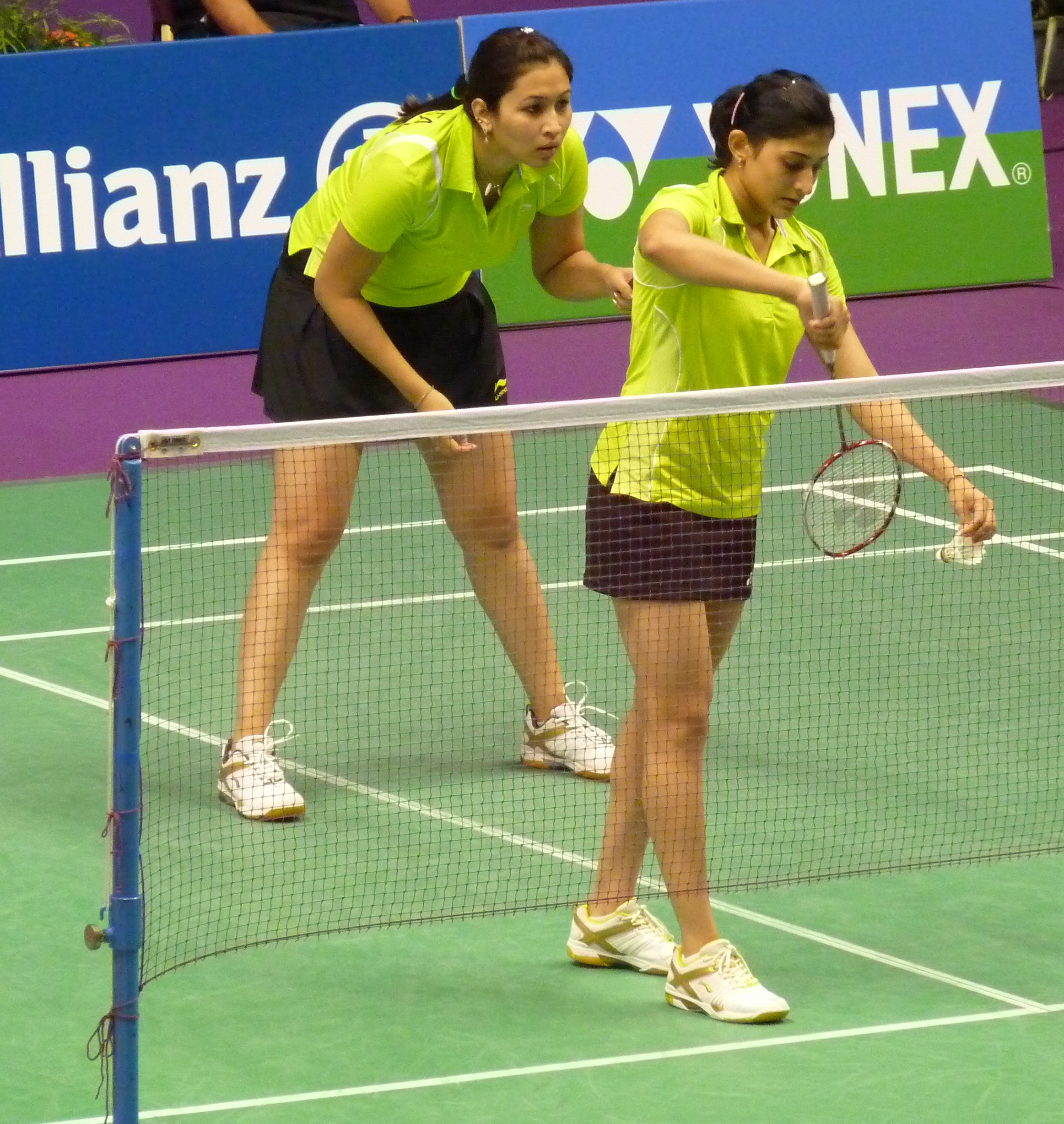
Badminton

- Badminton
  - Ball badminton
- Frontenis
- Battledore and shuttlecock
- Crossminton
- Qianball
- Rackets
- Racquetball
- Real tennis
- Road tennis
- Soft tennis
- Speed-ball
- Squash
  - Hardball squash
  - Squash tennis
- Stické
- Tennis
  - Wheelchair tennis
- Touchtennis

===== Sports that use a non-netted racket, or paddle =====
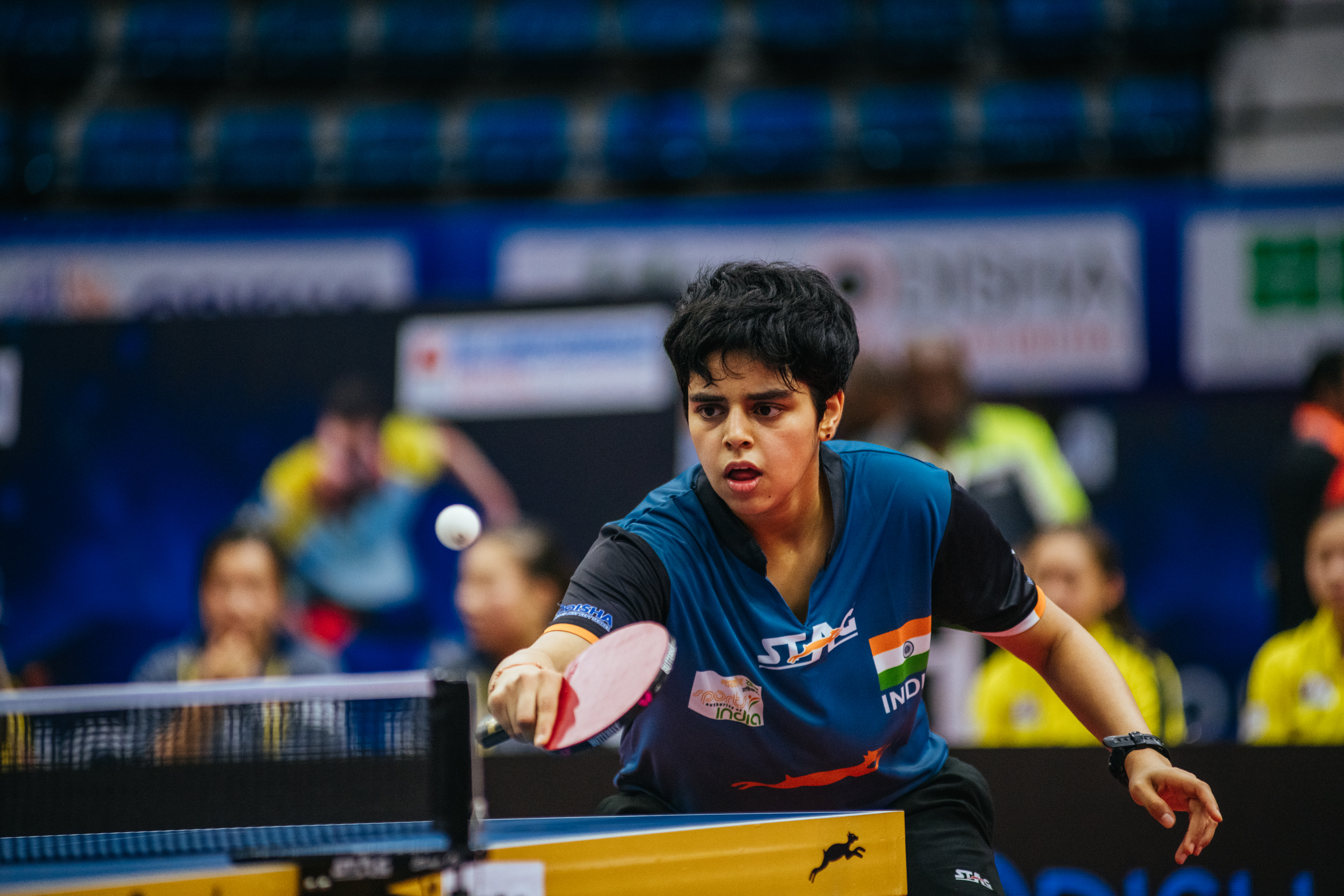
Table tennis

- Basque pelota
- Beach tennis
- Downside ball game
- Four wall paddleball
- Frescobol
- Hanetsuki
- Jombola
- Matkot
- Miniten
- One wall paddleball
- Paddle ball
- Paddle tennis
- Padel
- Paleta frontón
- Pang Pong
- Pelota mixteca
- Pickleball
- Platform tennis
- Sphairee
- Table squash
- Table tennis (Ping Pong)
  - Para table tennis

=== Other ball sports ===
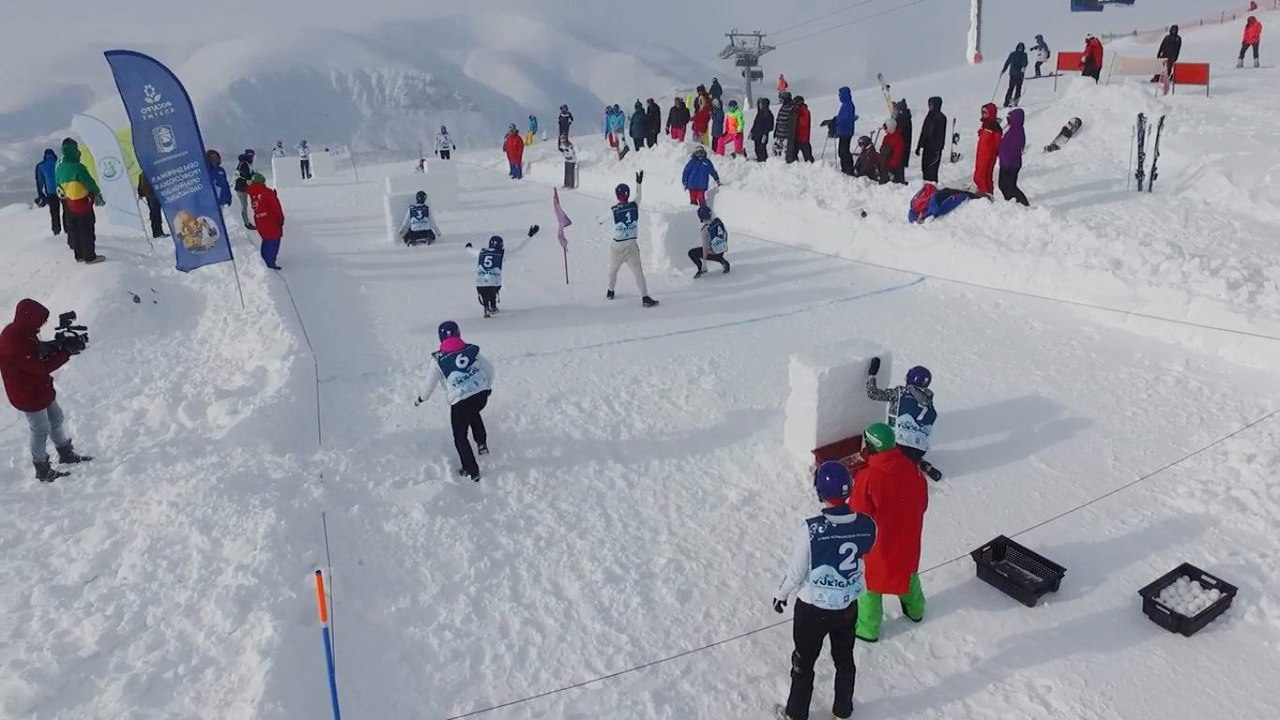
Yukigassen

- 500
- Catch
- Hornussen
- IJscolf
- Jeu de mail
- Keep away
  - Rondo
- Kolf
- Ritinis
- Snookball
- Yukigassen
- Klootschieten
  - Irish road bowling

== Board sports ==
Sports that are played with some sort of board as the primary equipment.

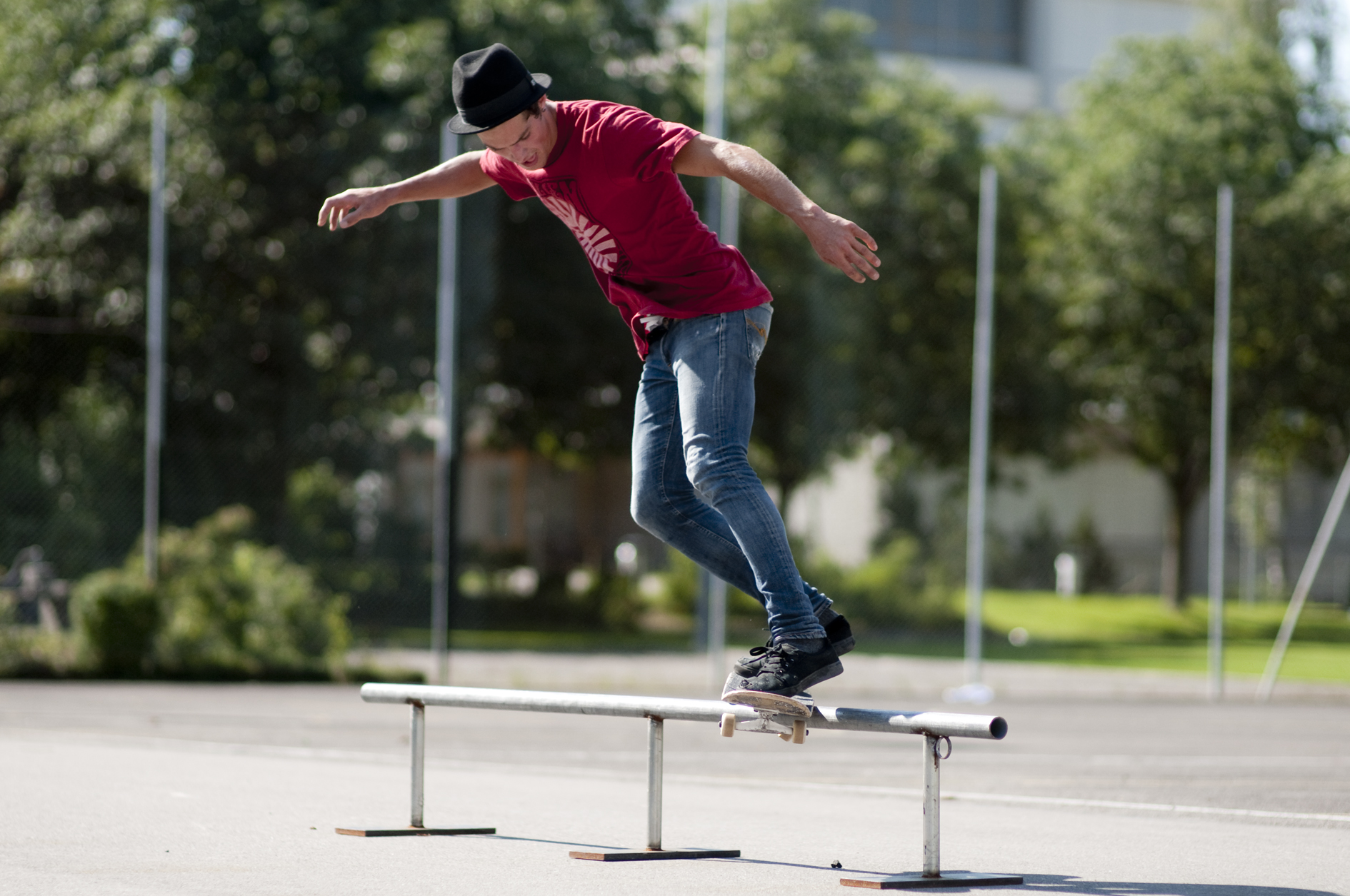
Skateboarding

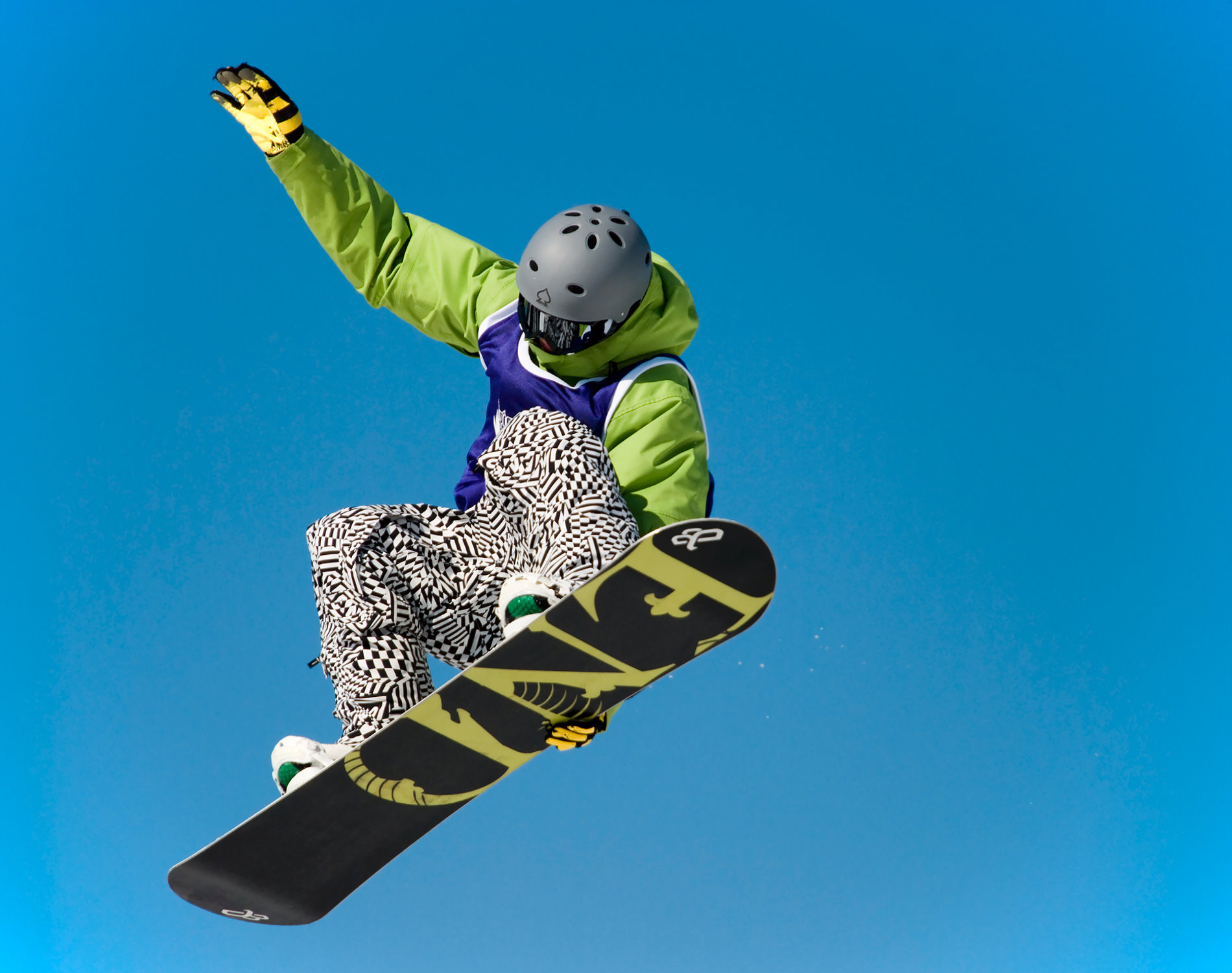
Snowboard figure at the 2008 Shakedown

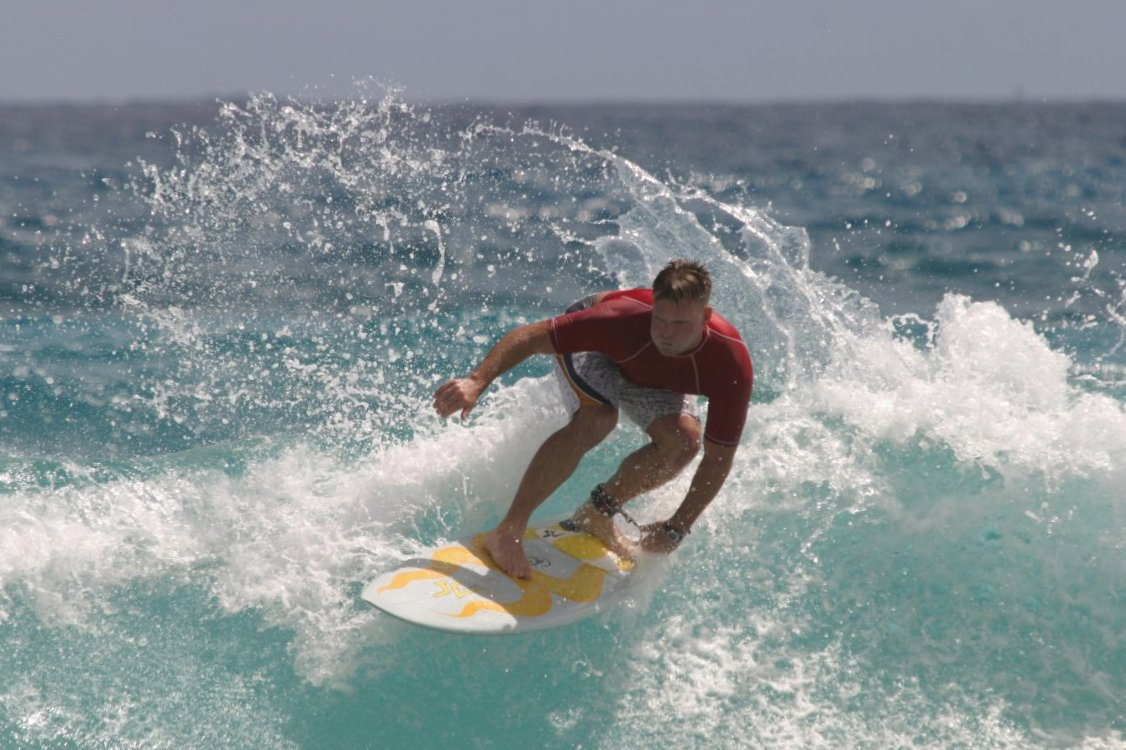
Surfing in Hawaii

- Hoverboarding
- Kite landboarding
- Land sailing
  - Land windsurfing
- Skateboarding
  - Casterboarding
  - Freeboard (skateboard)
  - Freestyle skateboarding
  - Longboarding
  - Mountainboarding
  - Snakeboarding
  - Streetboarding
  - Streetluge
- Scootering
- Skysurfing
- Skwal
- Snowboarding
  - Para snowboard
  - Sandboarding
  - Snowboard cross
  - Snowkiting
  - Snowskating
- Surfing
  - Bodyboarding
  - Dog surfing
  - Kiteboarding
  - Riverboarding
  - Skimboarding
  - Standup paddleboarding
  - Wakesurfing
  - Windsurfing
- Wakeboarding
  - Kneeboarding
- Paddleboarding

== Climbing ==
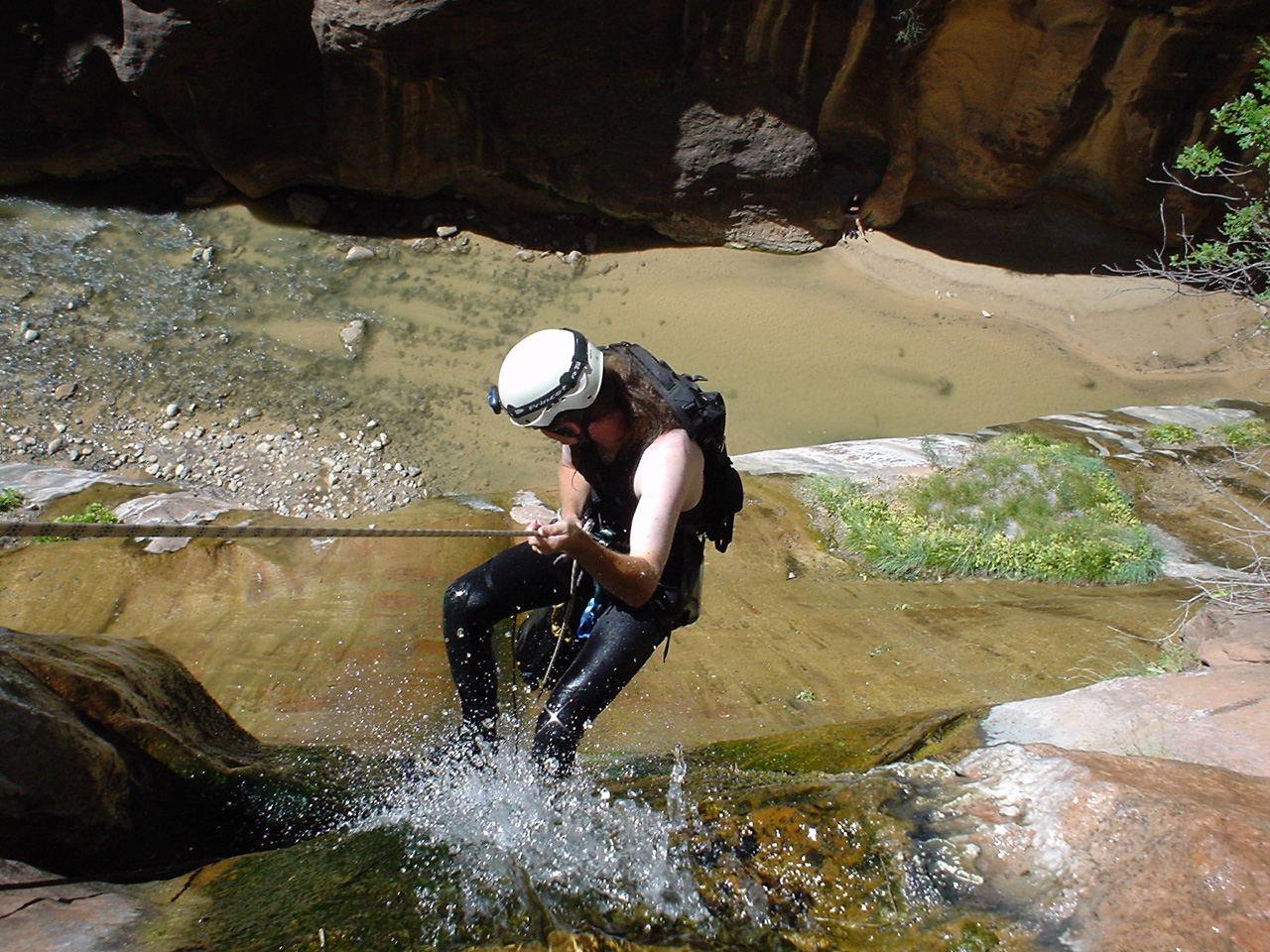
Canyoning

- Competition climbing
  - Competition bouldering
  - Competition ice climbing
  - Competition lead climbing
  - Competition speed climbing
- Ice climbing
  - Dry-tooling
  - Mixed climbing
- Mountaineering
  - Alpine climbing
  - Expedition climbing
- Paraclimbing
- Rock climbing
  - Aid climbing
  - Big wall climbing
  - Bouldering
  - Deep-water soloing
  - Multi-pitch climbing
  - Sport climbing
  - Traditional climbing
  - Speed climbing
- Solo climbing
  - Free solo climbing
  - Rope solo climbing
- Top rope climbing
- Other
  - Canyoning (Canyoneering)
  - Coasteering
  - Hiking
  - Pole climbing
  - Rope climbing
  - Sawanobori

== Combat sports: wrestling and martial arts ==
A combat sport is a competitive contact sport where two combatants fight against each other using certain rules of engagement.

=== Grappling ===
Grappling match

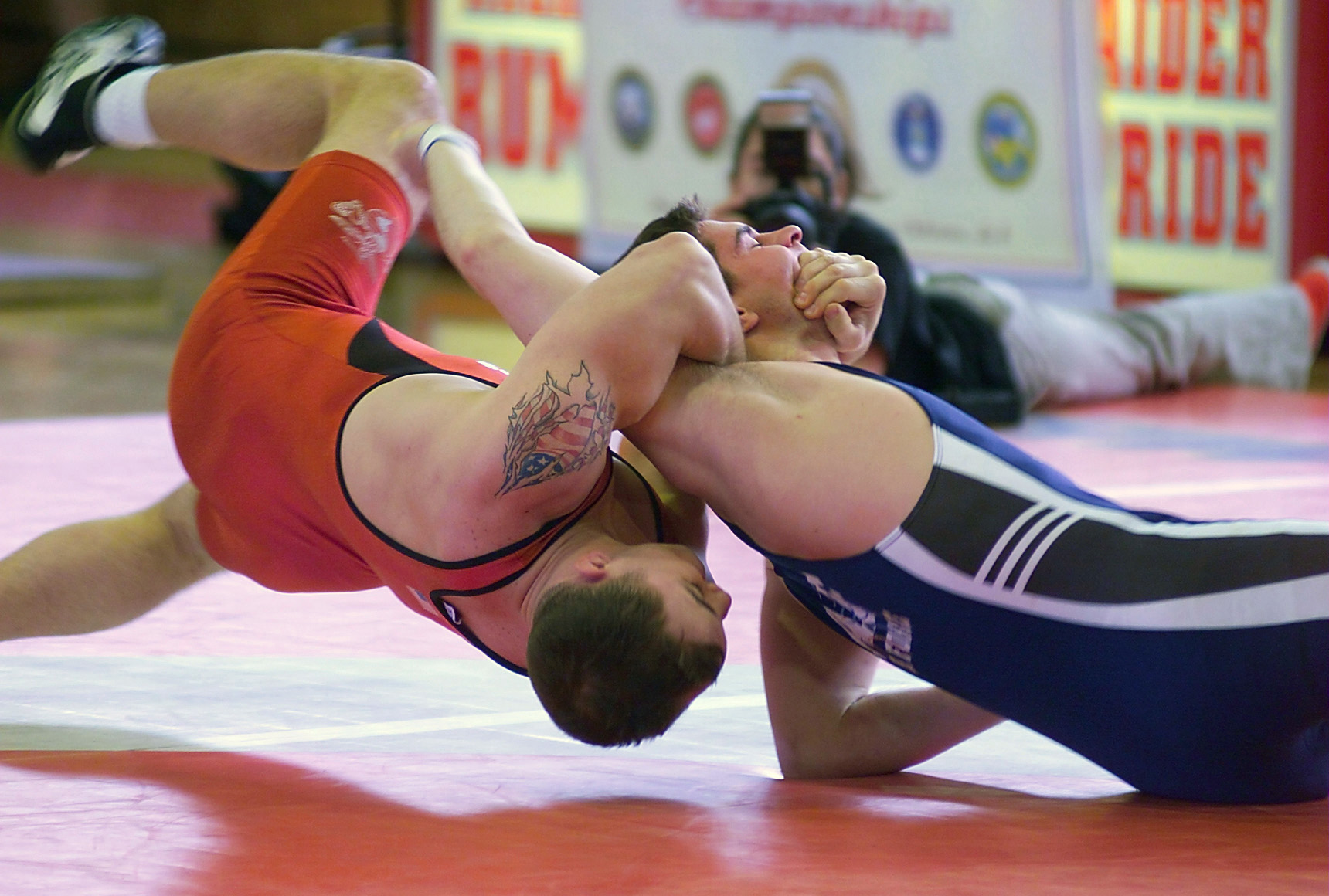
Two men compete in freestyle wrestling.

- Aiki-jūjutsu
  - Aikido
- Aquathlon (underwater wrestling)
- Arm Wrestling
- Leg wrestling
- Jujutsu
  - Brazilian jiu-jitsu
    - 10th Planet Jiu Jitsu
  - Gyokushin-ryū Jujutsu
  - Hakkō-ryū
  - Car-Jitsu
  - Judo
    - Kosen judo
    - Para judo
- Sambo (martial art)
- Sumo
- Wrestling
  - Amateur wrestling
    - Backyard wrestling
    - Greco-Roman wrestling
    - Freestyle wrestling
    - Collegiate wrestling
    - Scholastic wrestling
  - Beach wrestling
  - Belt wrestling
  - Catch wrestling
  - Folk wrestling
    - Alysh
    - Scottish backhold
    - Barróg
    - Bokh
    - Boli Khela
    - Bultong
    - Buno
    - Canarian wrestling
    - Collar-and-elbow
    - Cornish wrestling
    - Cumberland and Westmorland wrestling
    - Devon wrestling
    - Dumog
    - Gatta Gusthi
    - Glima
    - Gouren
    - Huka-huka
    - Karakucak
    - Kene
    - Kurash
    - Lancashire wrestling
    - Leonese wrestling
    - Lutte Traditionnelle
    - Malakhra
    - Malla-yuddha
    - Mongolian wrestling
    - Mukna
    - Naban
    - Narodno rvanje
    - Pehlwani
    - Ringen
    - Ristynės
    - Schwingen
    - Shuai jiao
    - Ssireum
    - Tegumi
    - Varzesh-e Pahlavani
    - Yağlı Güreş
  - Greek wrestling
  - Jacket wrestling
  - Mud wrestling
  - Professional wrestling
  - Submission wrestling
    - International grappling

=== Striking ===
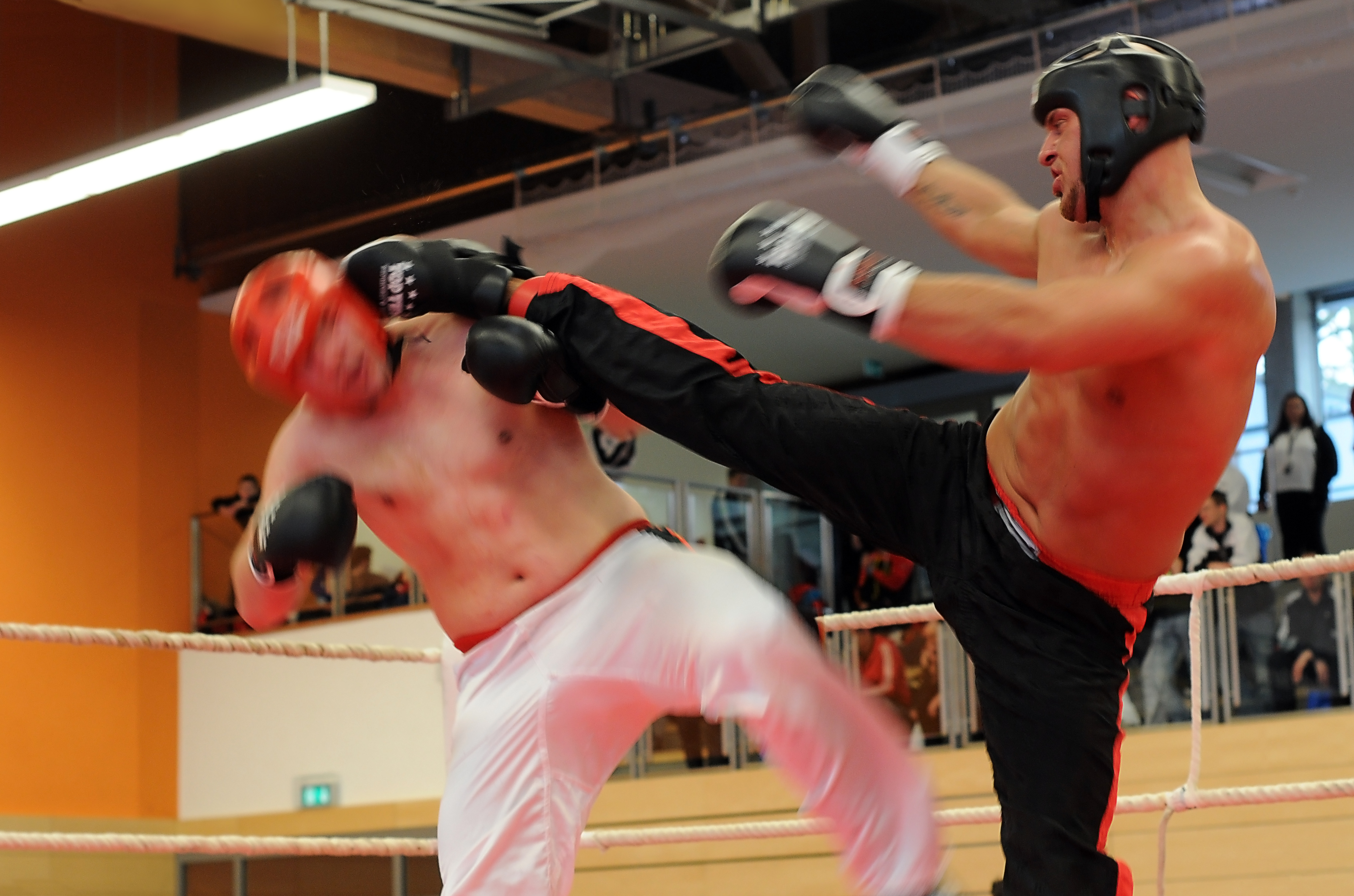
A kick in kickboxing.

- Adimurai
- Bajiquan
- Bokator
- Boxing
  - Amateur boxing
  - Ancient Greek boxing
  - Bare-knuckle boxing
  - Chess boxing
  - Chivarreto boxing
  - Russian boxing
- Engolo
  - Danmyé
  - Knocking and kicking
  - Capoeira
    - Capoeira carioca
    - Capoeira Angola
    - Capoeira Regional
- Choi Kwang-Do
- Dambe
- Fujian White Crane
- Karate
- Kenpō
- Kickboxing
  - Musti-yuddha
  - Lethwei
  - Muay boran
    - Muay Chaiya
    - Muay Thai
  - Muay Lao
  - Kun Khmer
  - Savate
- Shaolin kung fu
- Shin-kicking
- Sikaran
- Silat
- Slap fighting
- Subak
- Taekkyeon
- Taekwondo
  - Para taekwondo
- Taidō
- Tang Soo Do
- Vovinam
- Wing Chun

=== Mixed or hybrid ===
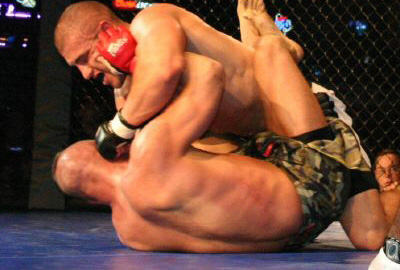
Ground fighting in MMA.

- American Kenpo
- ARB
- Baguazhang
- Bando
- Bartitsu
- Bujinkan
- Hapkido
- Chun Kuk Do
- Hwa Rang Do
- Jeet Kune Do
- Kajukenbo
- Kalaripayattu
- Krav Maga
- Kuk Sool Won
- Luta livre
- Marine Corps Martial Arts Program
- Mixed martial arts
- Medieval MMA
- Northern Praying Mantis
- Ninjutsu
- Pankration
- Pencak Silat
- Sanda
- Shidōkan Karate
- Shōrin-ryū Shidōkan
- Shooto
- Shoot boxing
- Shootfighting
- Shoot wrestling
- Shorinji Kempo
- Systema
- Tai chi
- Unifight
- Vajra-mushti
- Vale tudo
- Xingyiquan
- Zen Bu Kan Kempo

=== Weapons ===
Valid targets in fencing disciplines

Sabre

Foil

Epee

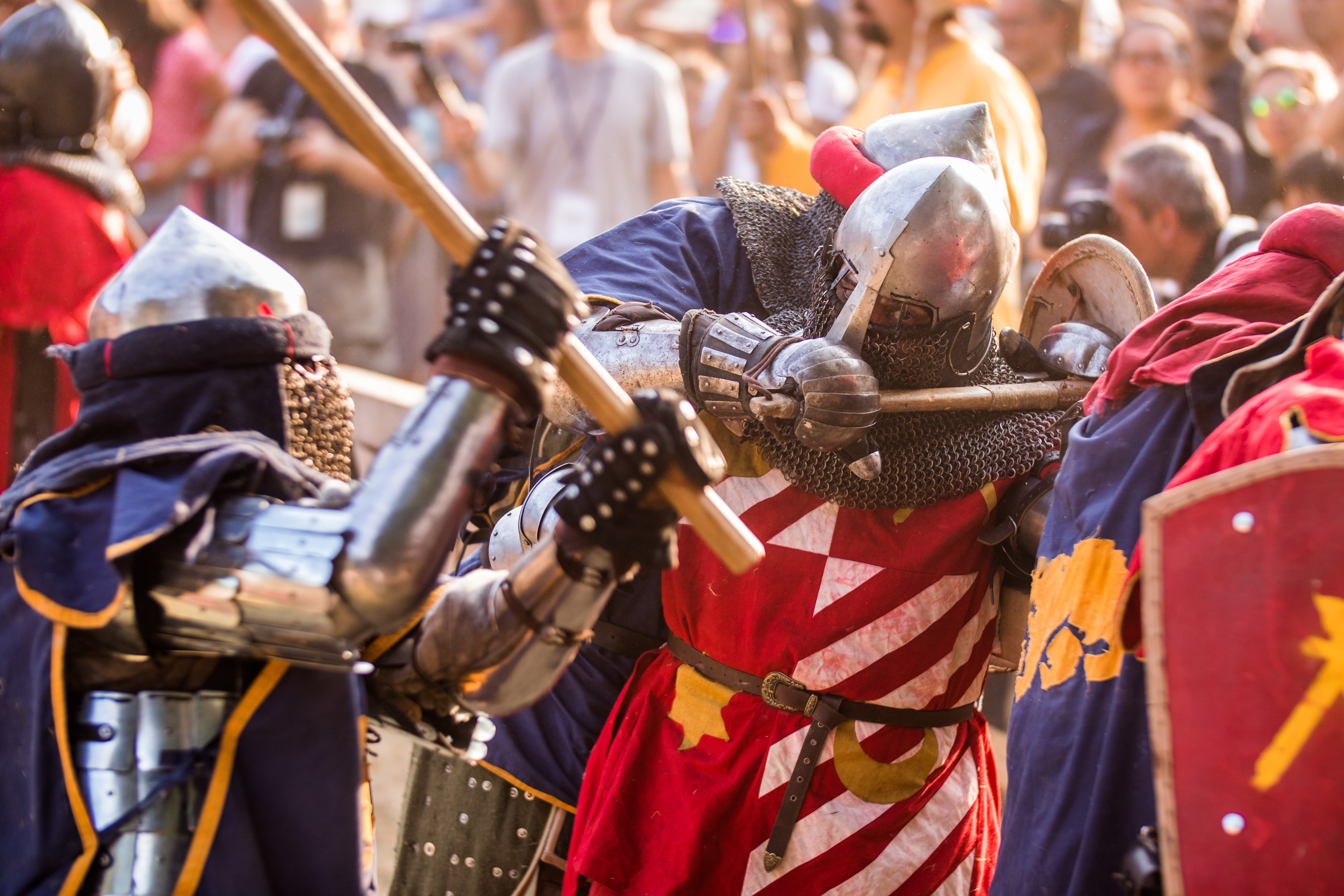
Armored combat mass battle

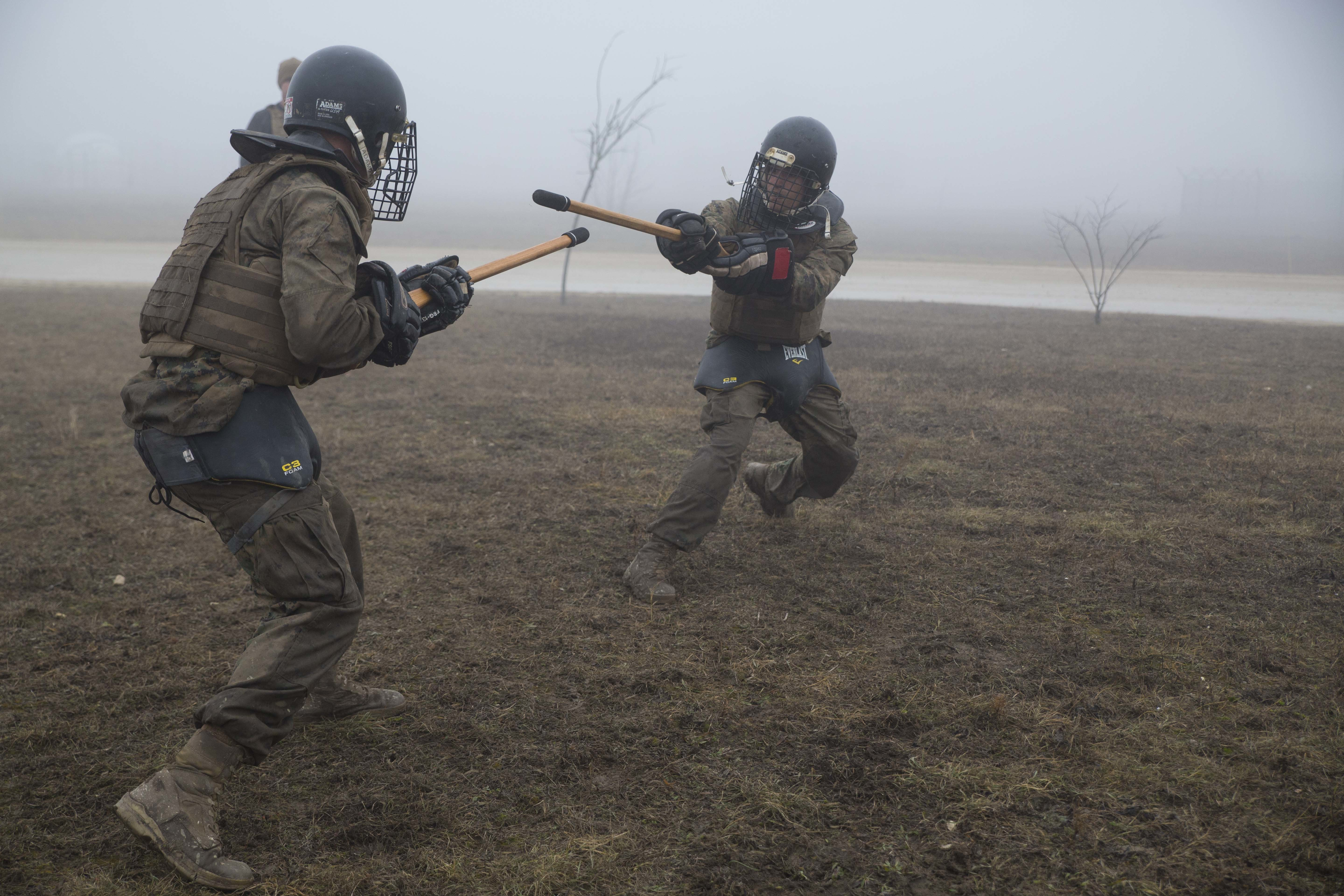
Bayonet techniques

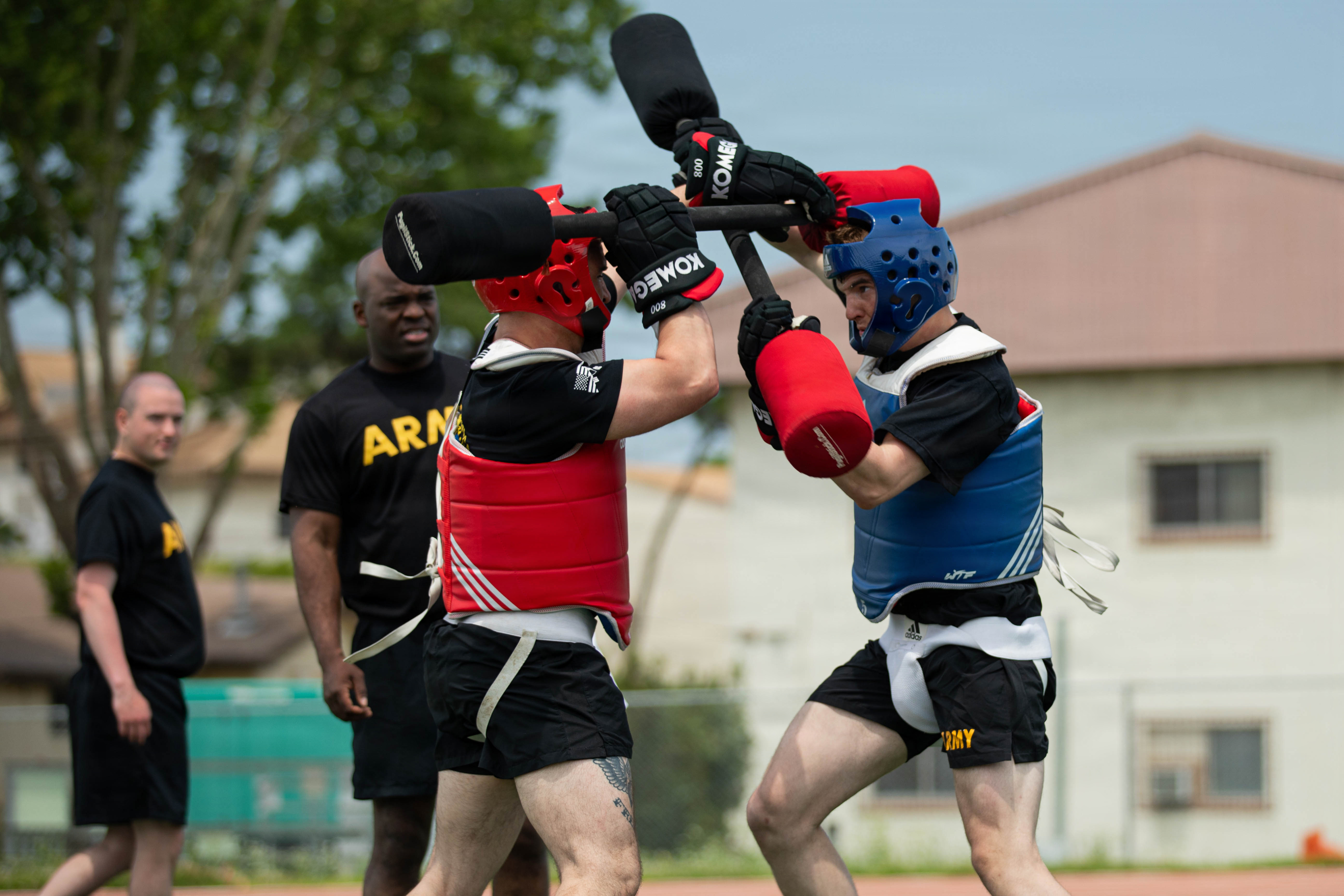
Pugil stick bout

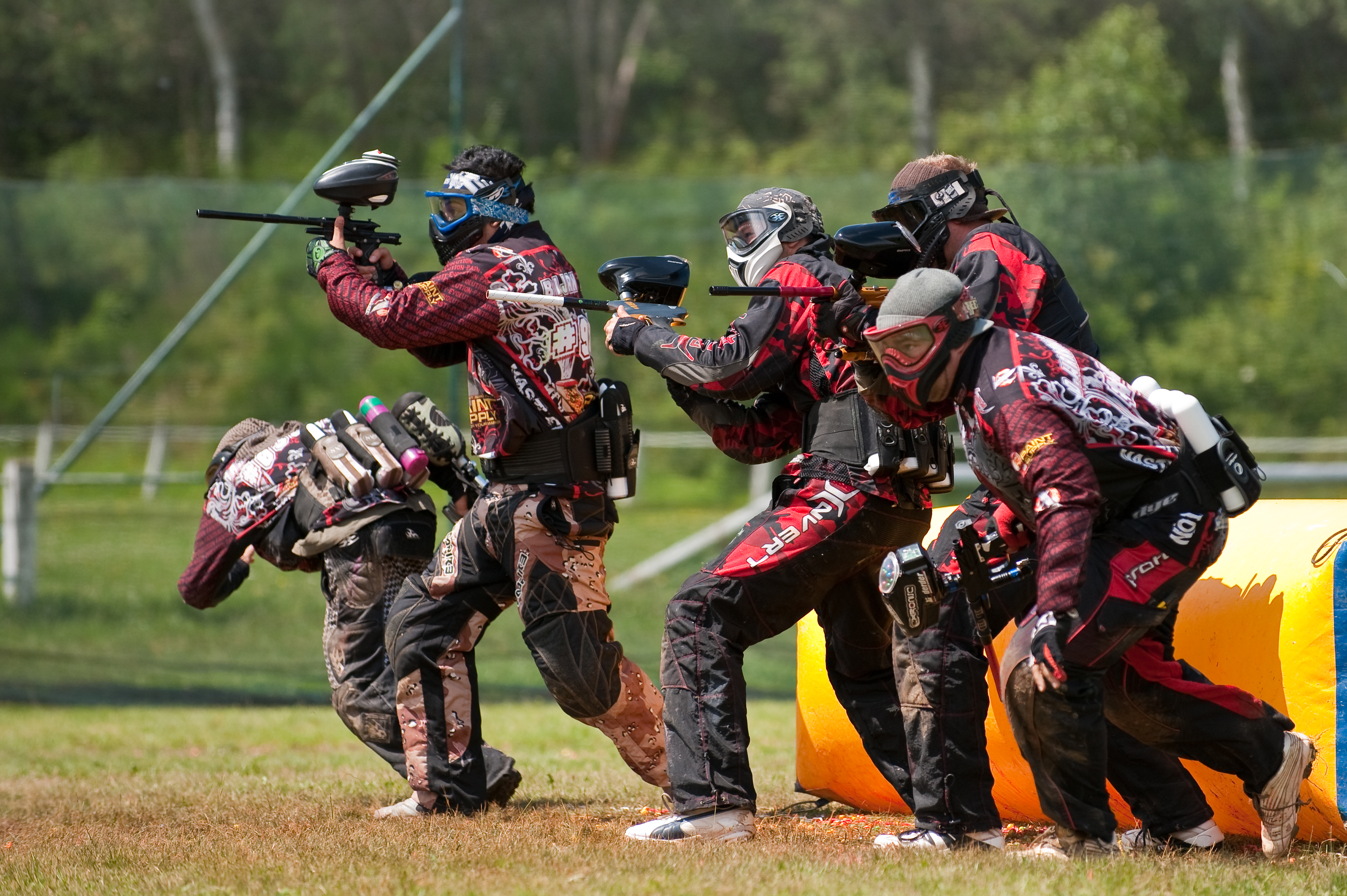
Paintball

- Armored combat (sport)
- Boffer fighting
- Cardboard Tube Fighting
- Combat archery
- Eskrima
  - Modern Arnis
- German school of fencing
- Guns
  - Airsoft
  - Laser tag
  - Paintball
    - Scenario paintball
    - Speedball
    - Woodsball
- Historical European martial arts
- Hojōjutsu
- Iaido
- Iaijutsu
- Jieitaikakutōjutsu
- Jittejutsu
- Jousting
- Kapap
- Kendo
- Kenjutsu
- Krabi–krabong
- Kumdo
- Kung fu
- Kyūdō
- Kyūjutsu
- Naginatajutsu
- Okinawan kobudō
- Pillow Fight Championship
- Qwan Ki Do
- Shurikenjutsu
- Silambam
- Sōjutsu
- Sports Chanbara
- Stick-fighting
  - Bartitsu
  - Bōjutsu
  - Canne de combat
  - Egyptian stick fencing
  - Gatka
  - Jōdō
  - Jogo do pau
  - Jūkendō
  - lathi khela
  - Nguni stick-fighting
  - Quarterstaff
  - Singlestick
- Swords
  - Academic fencing
  - Classical fencing
  - Fencing
    - Epee
    - Foil
    - Sabre
    - High school fencing
    - Wheelchair fencing
  - Battōjutsu
- Vajra-mushti
- Wing Chun
- Wushu

== Exercising ==
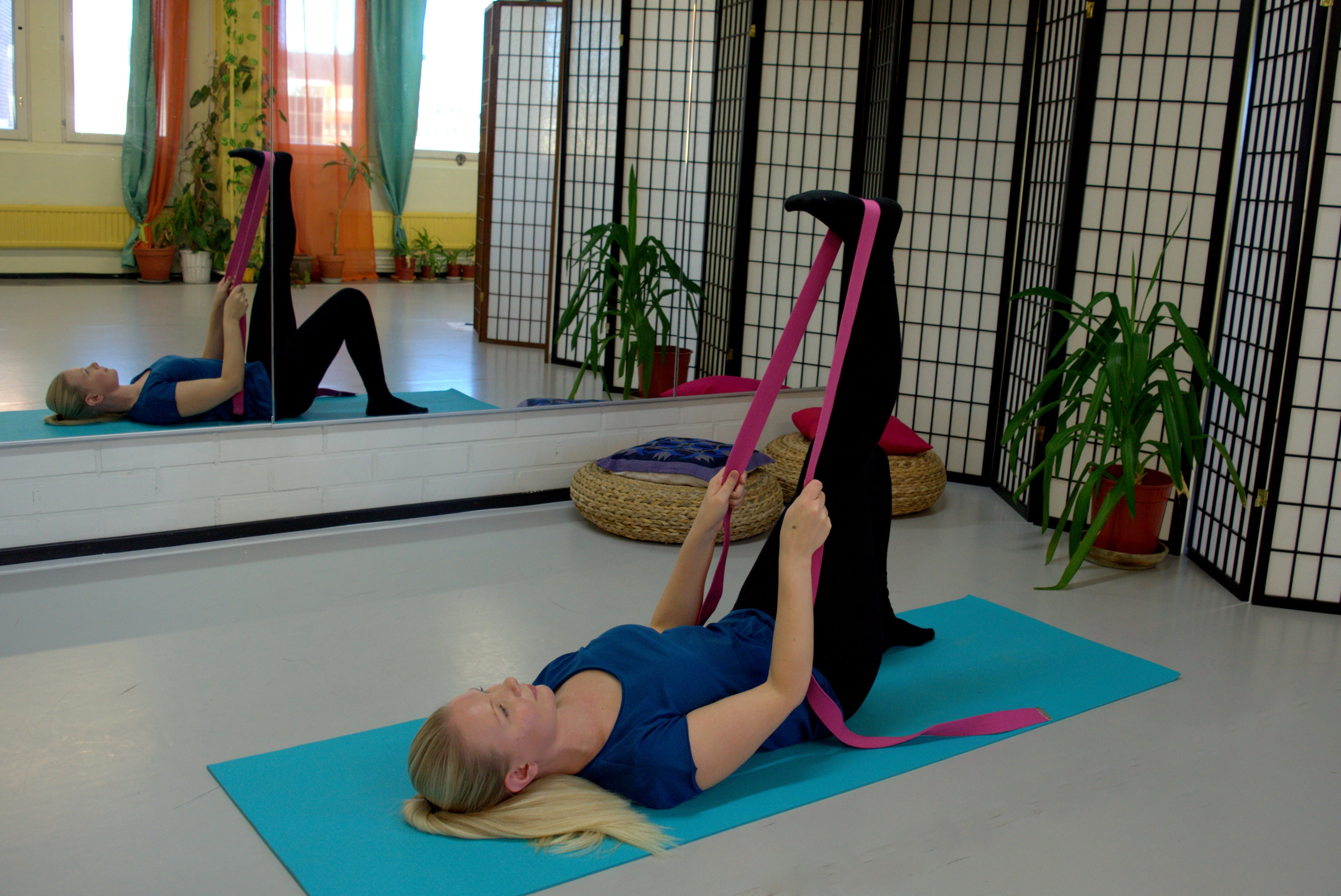
Pilates

- Aerobics
  - Aerobic exercise
    - Water aerobics
- Anaerobic exercise
- Calisthenics
  - Street workout
- Indoor cycling
- Pilates
- Yoga as exercise
  - Acroyoga
  - Competitive yoga

== Flying disc sports ==
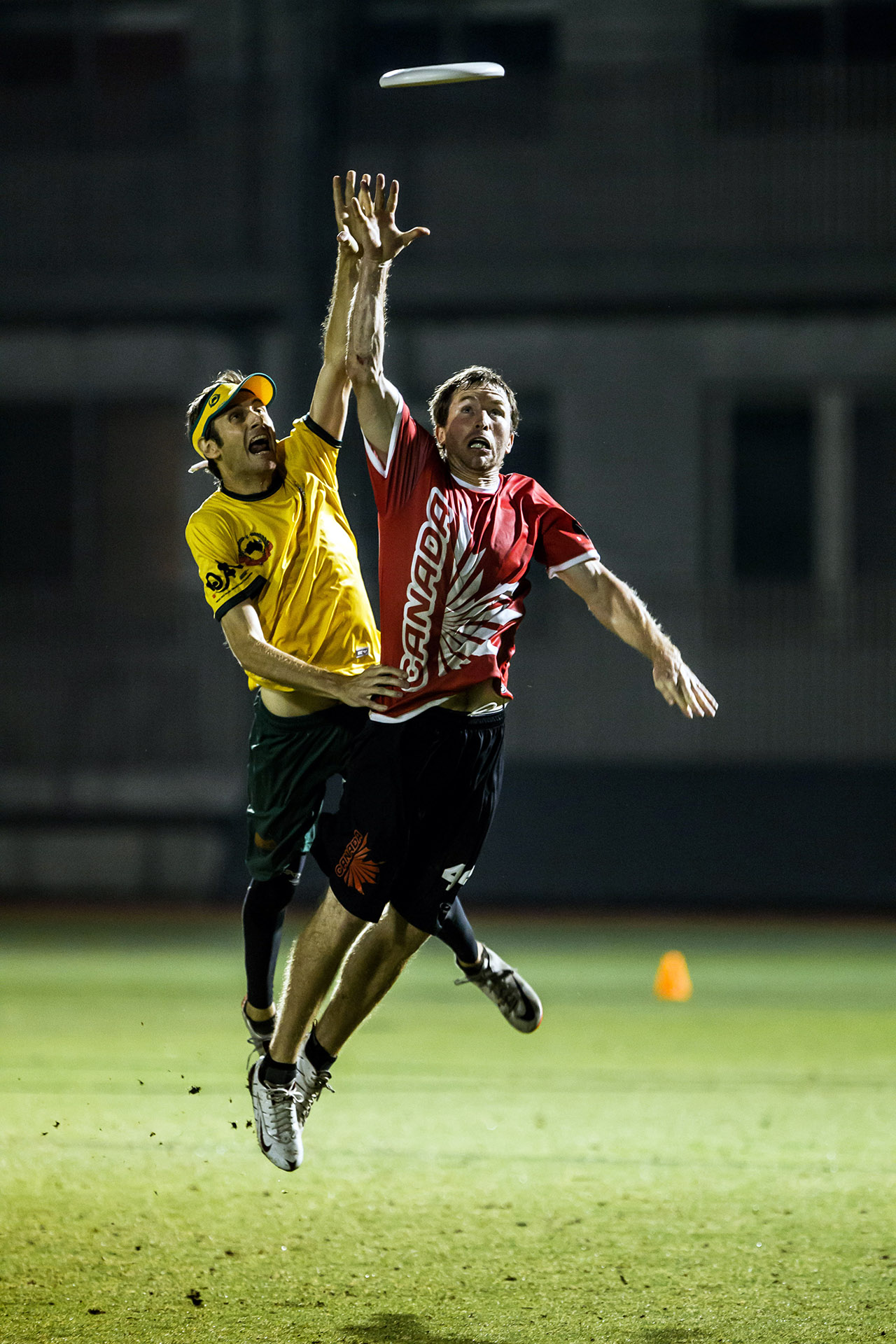
Australia vs Canada ultimate players WUGC 2012 in Japan. Ultimate Canada

- 500
- Crossbee
- Disc dog
- Disc golf
  - Disc golf (urban)
- Double disc court
- Freestyle
- Fricket
- Frisbee
- Guts
  - Dodge disc
  - Flutterguts
- KanJam
- Polish horseshoes
- Ultimate
  - Goaltimate
  - Hot box
  - KanJam
  - Schtick

== Gymnastics ==
Artistic gymnastics apparatuses

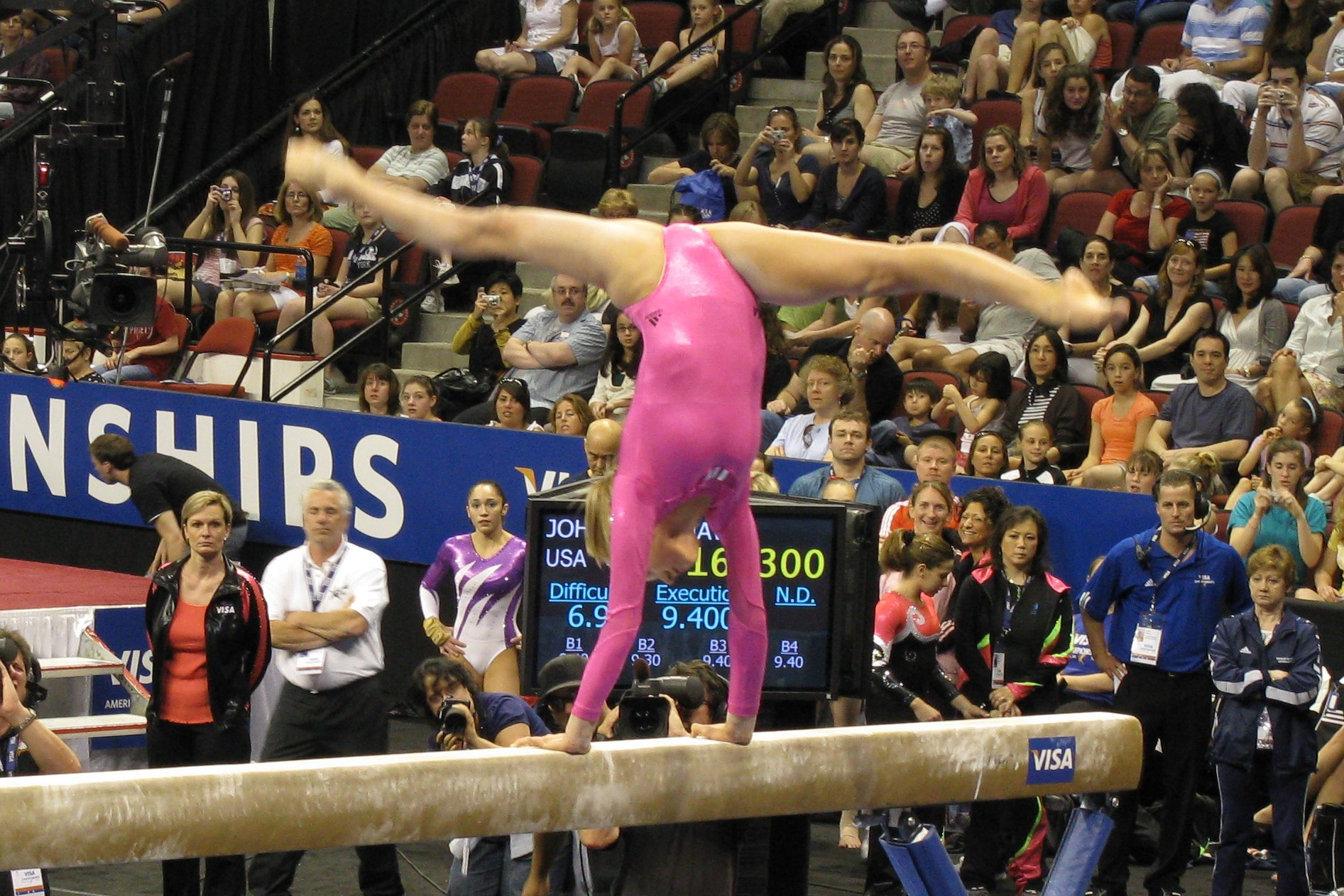
Balance beam

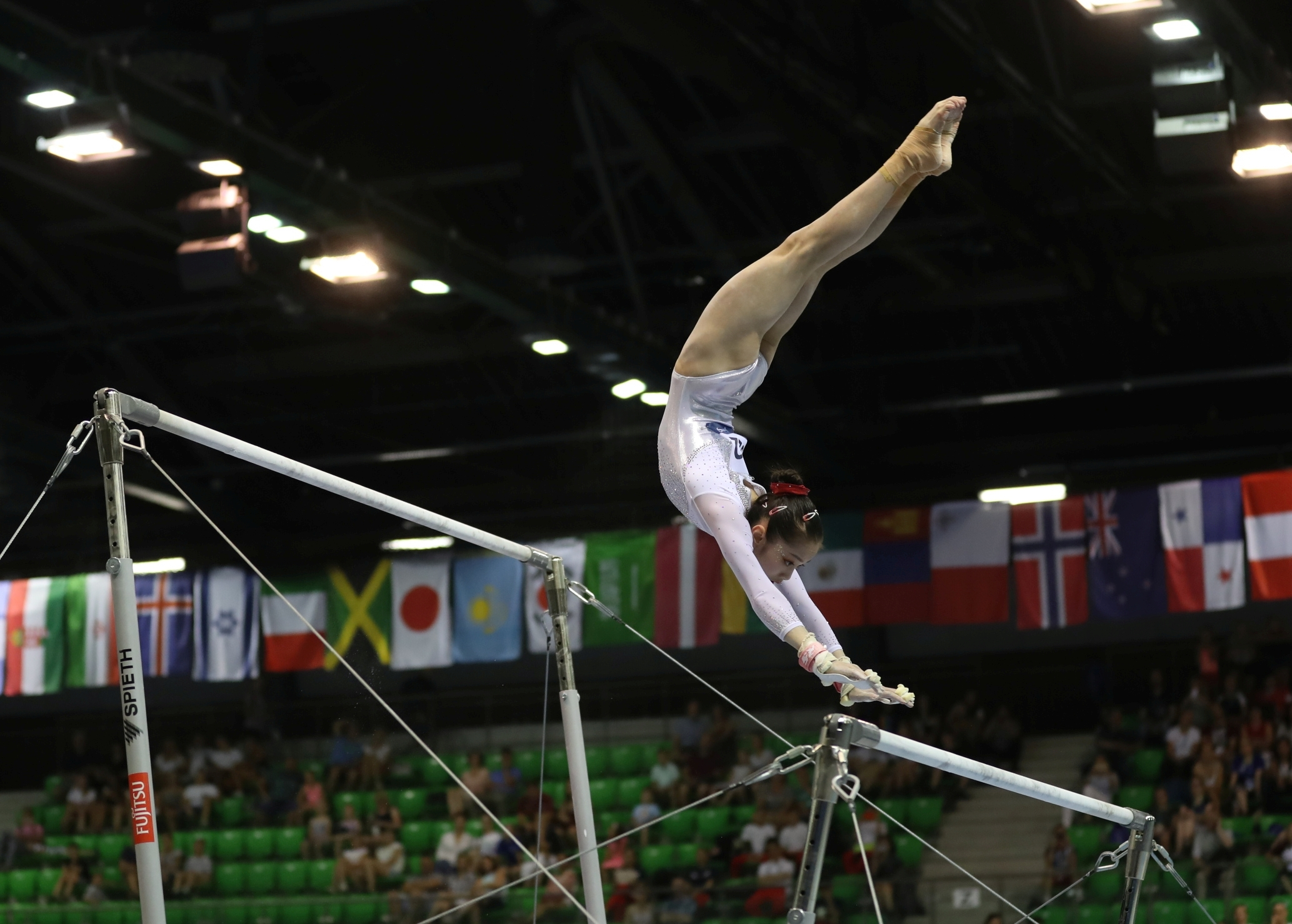
Uneven bars

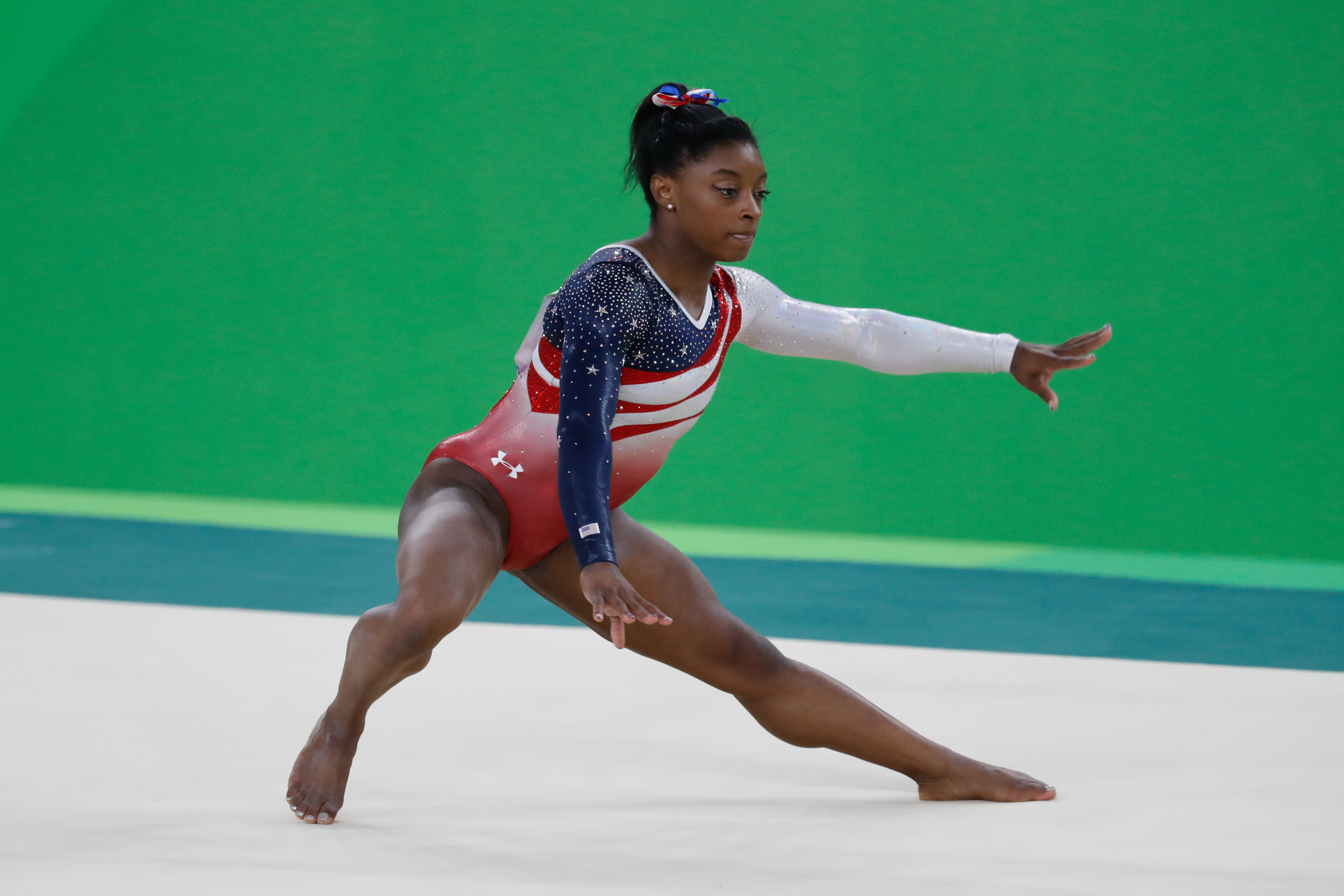
Floor

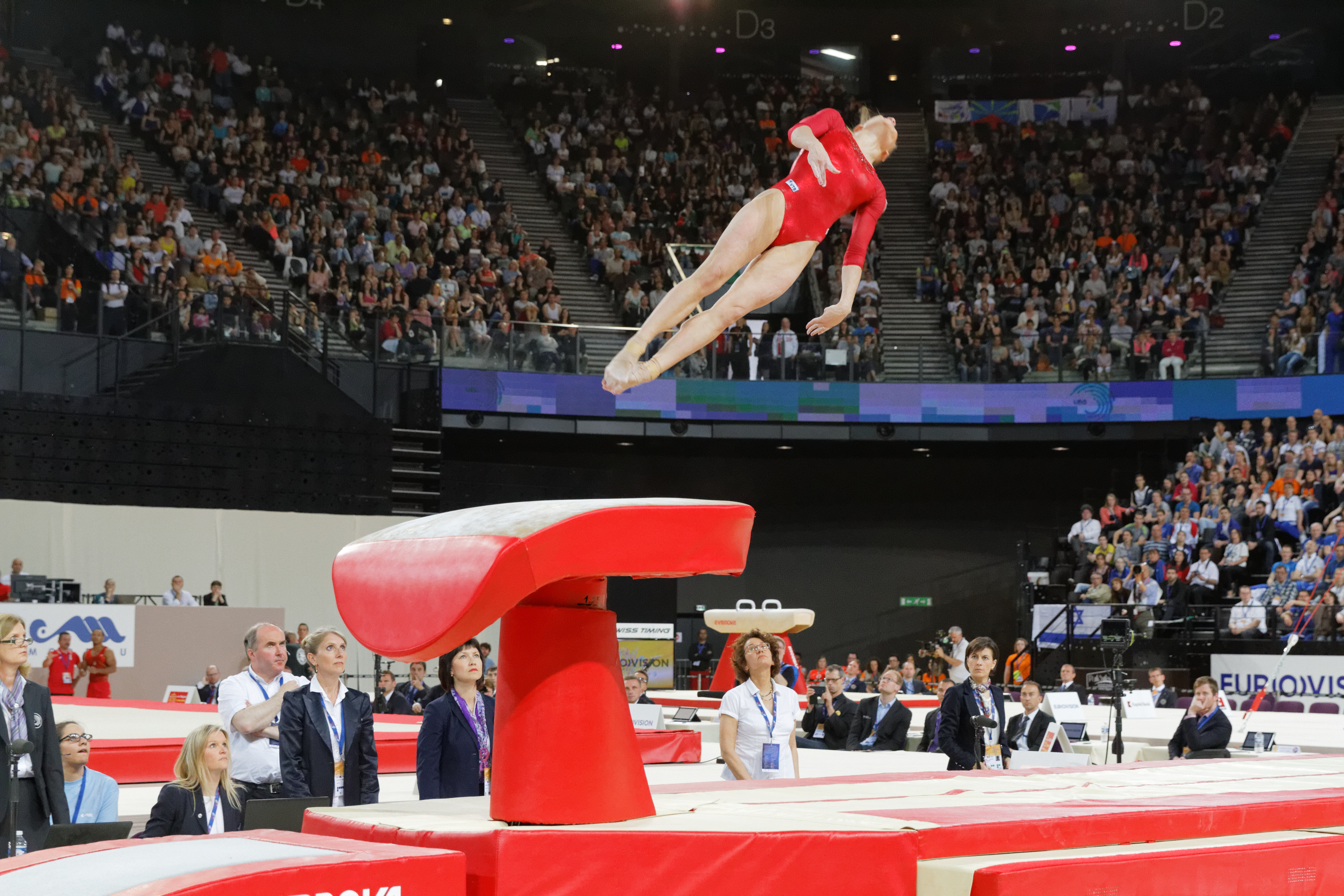
Vault

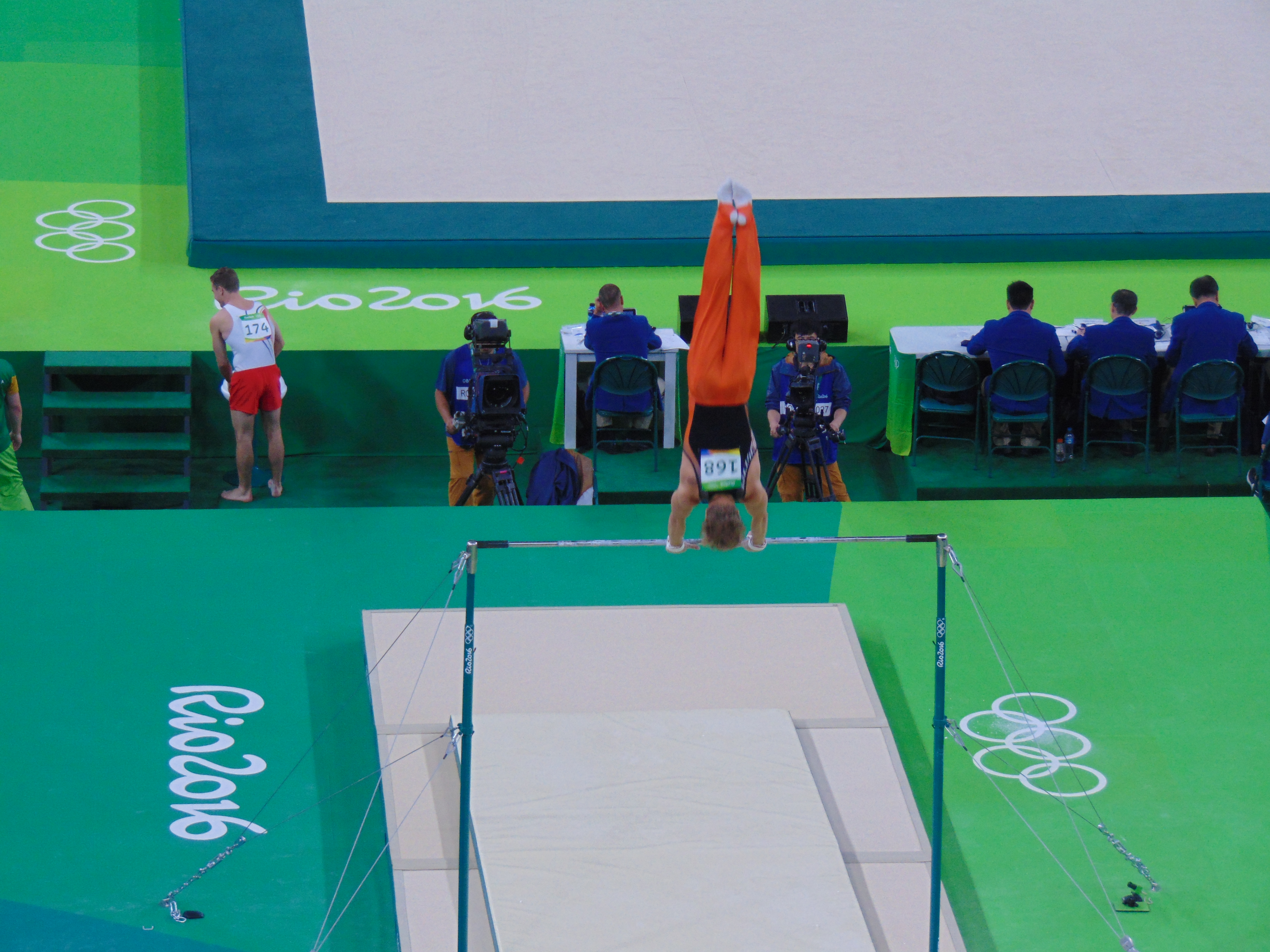
Horizontal bar

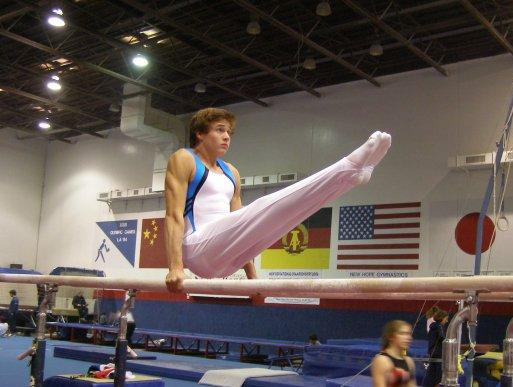
Parallel bars

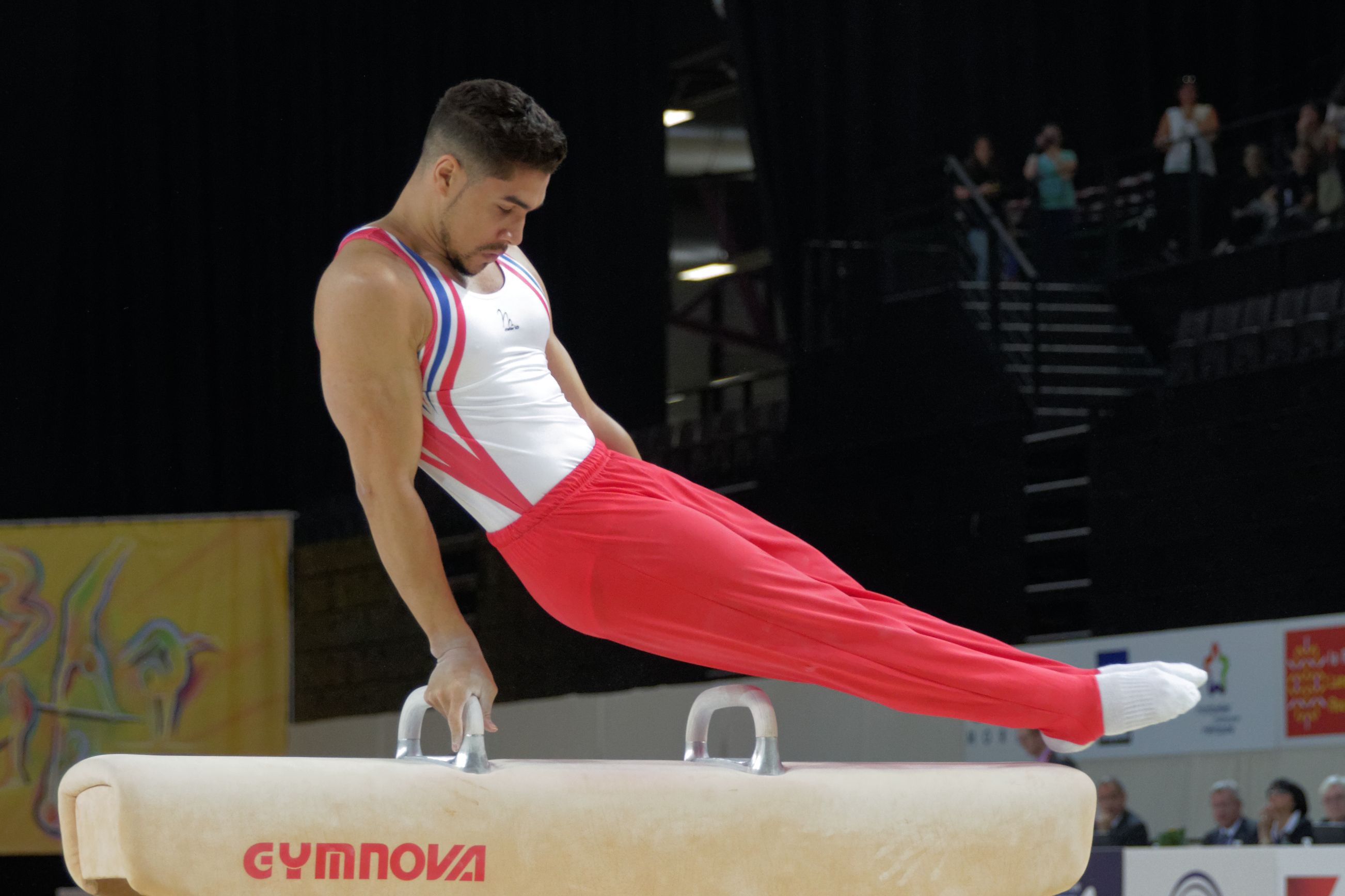
Pommel horse

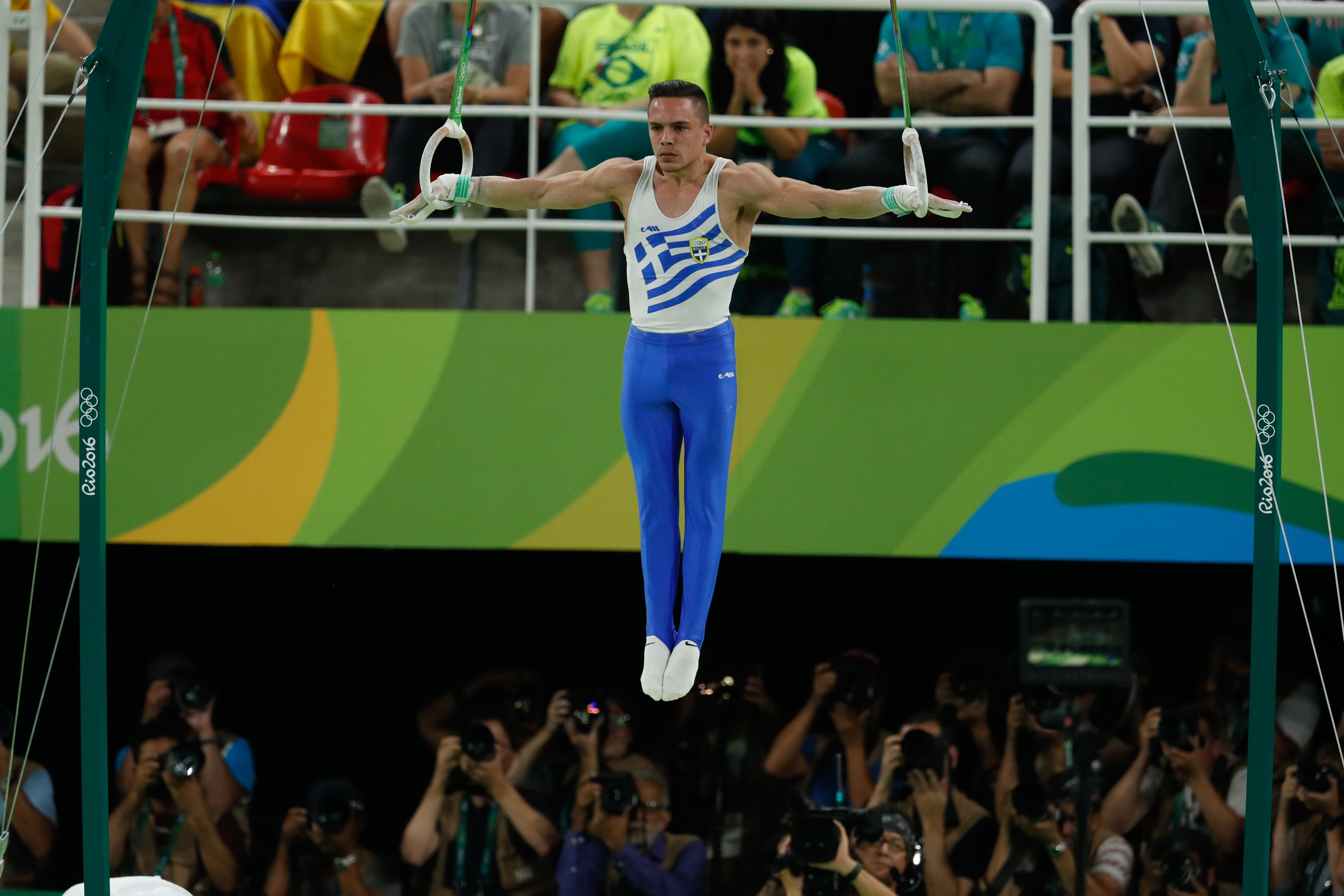
Still rings

Rhythmic gymnastics apparatuses

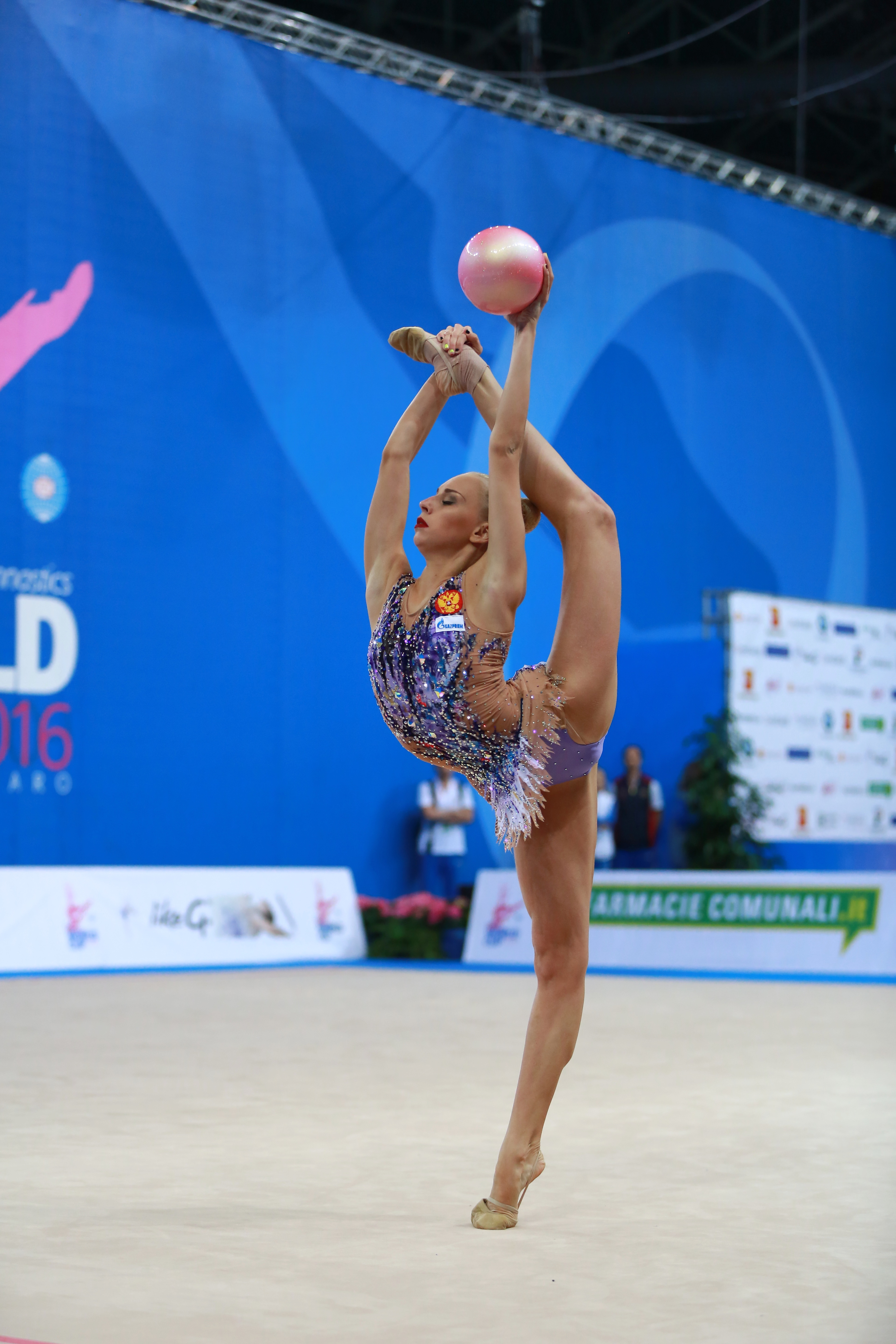
Ball

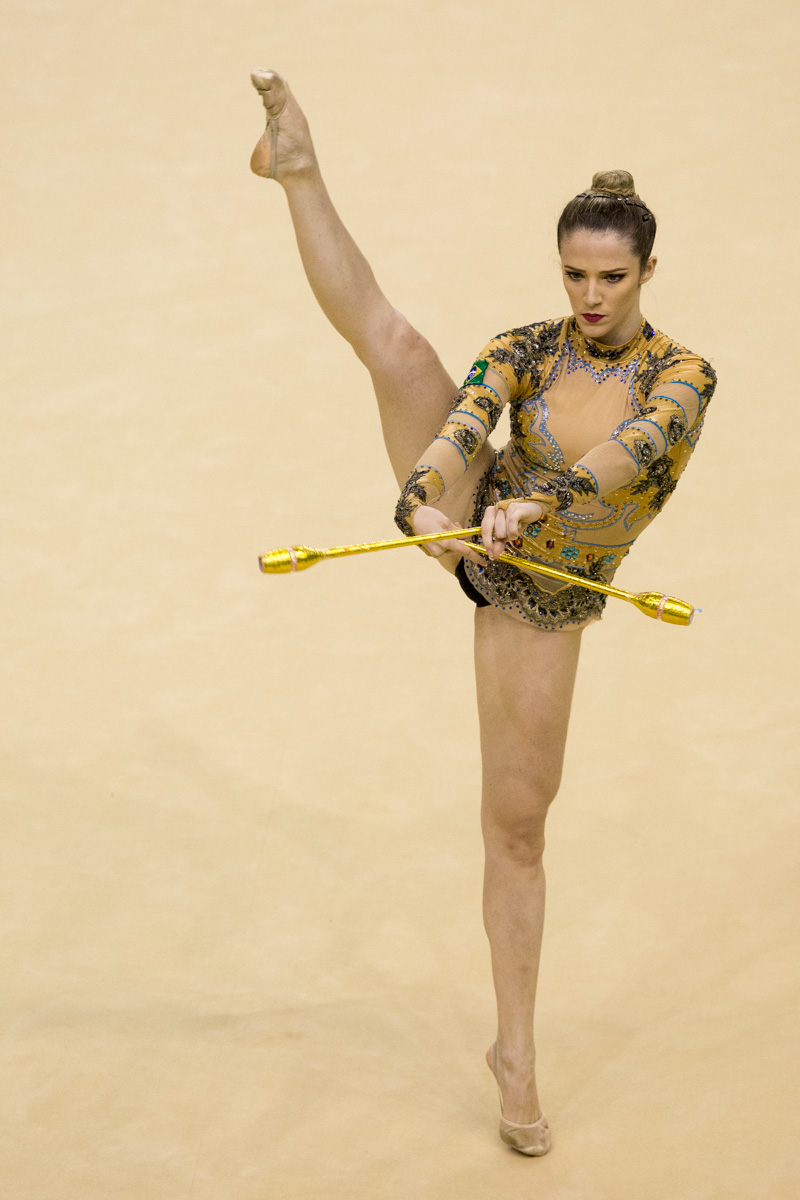
Clubs

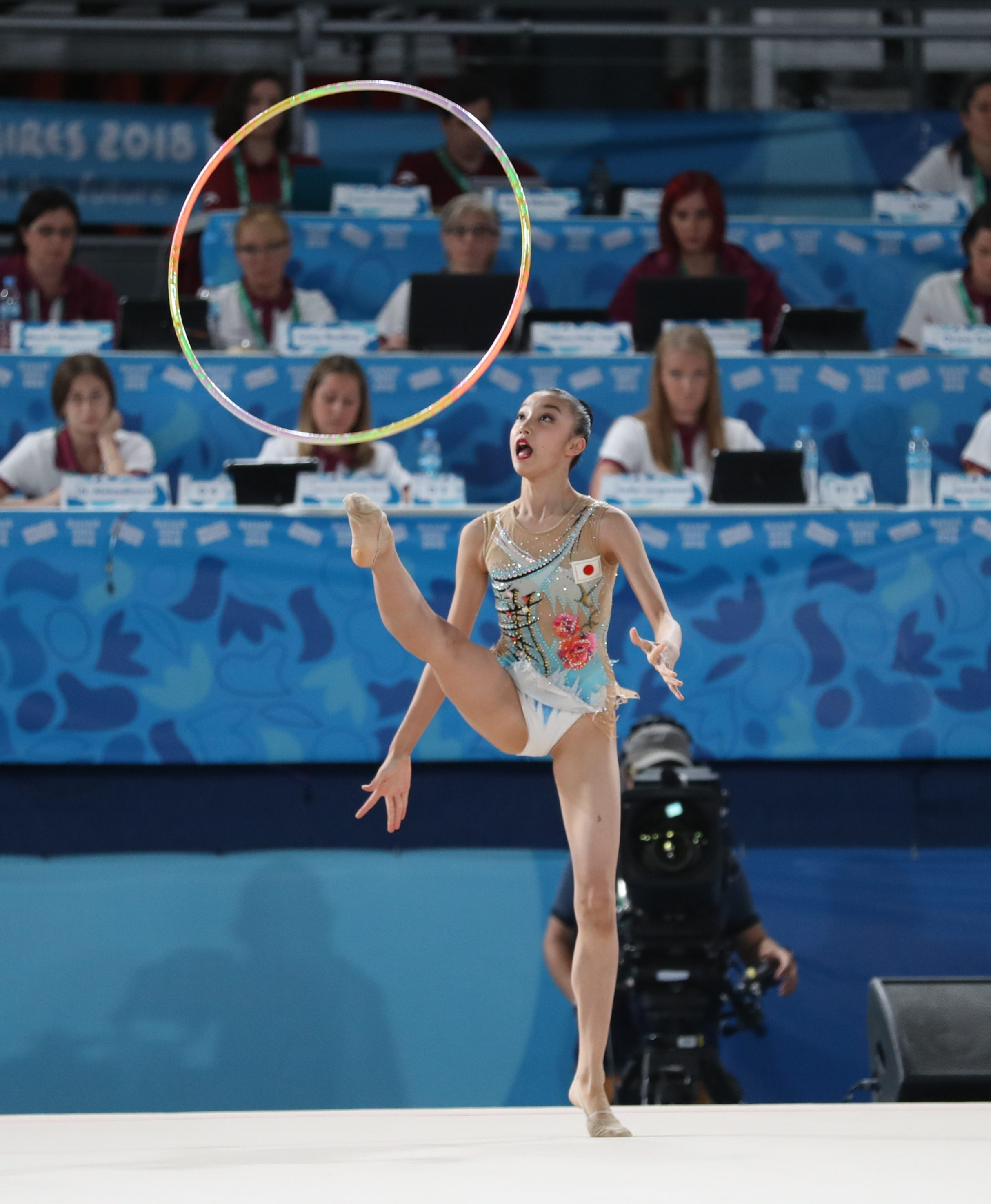
Hoop

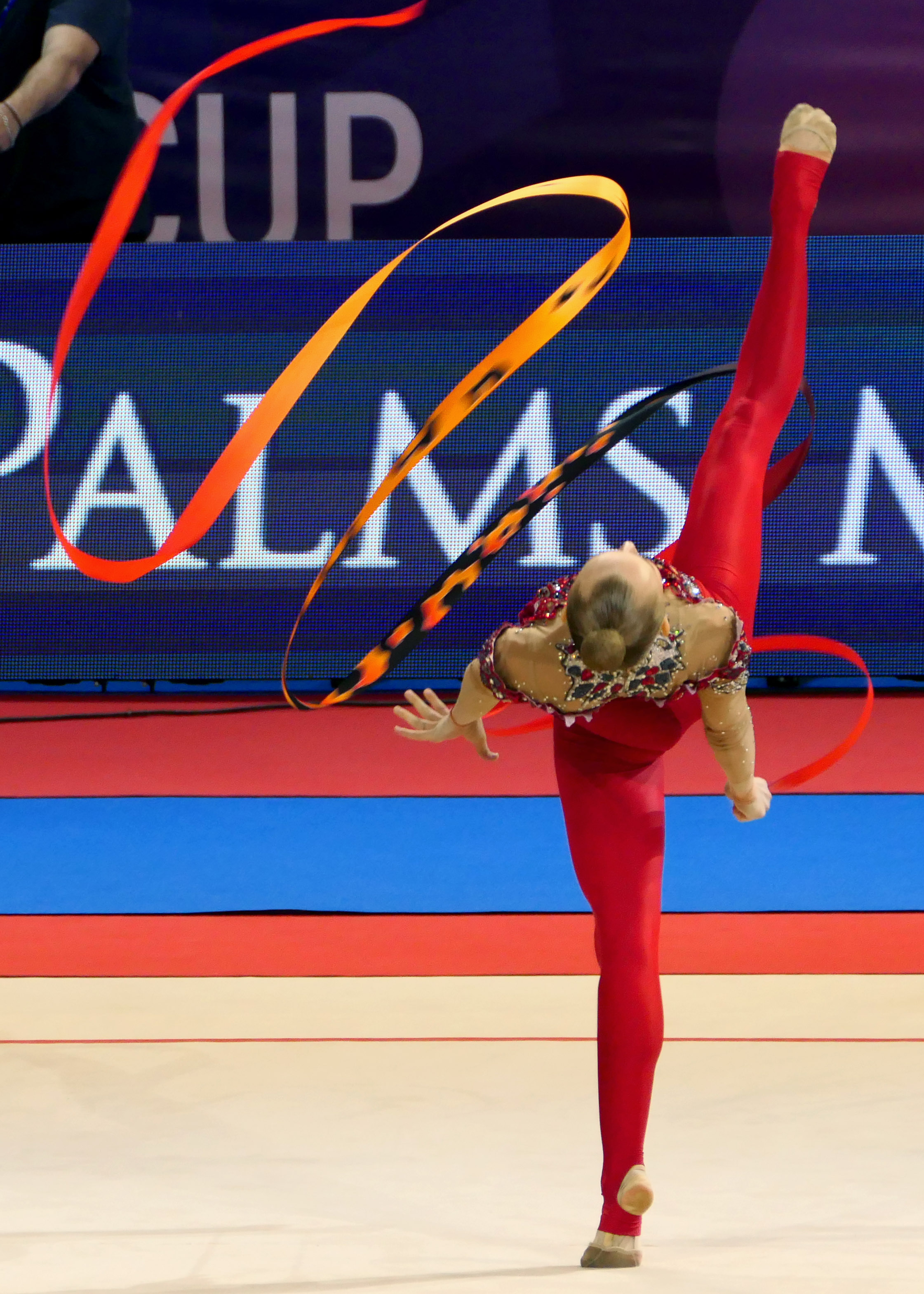
Ribbon

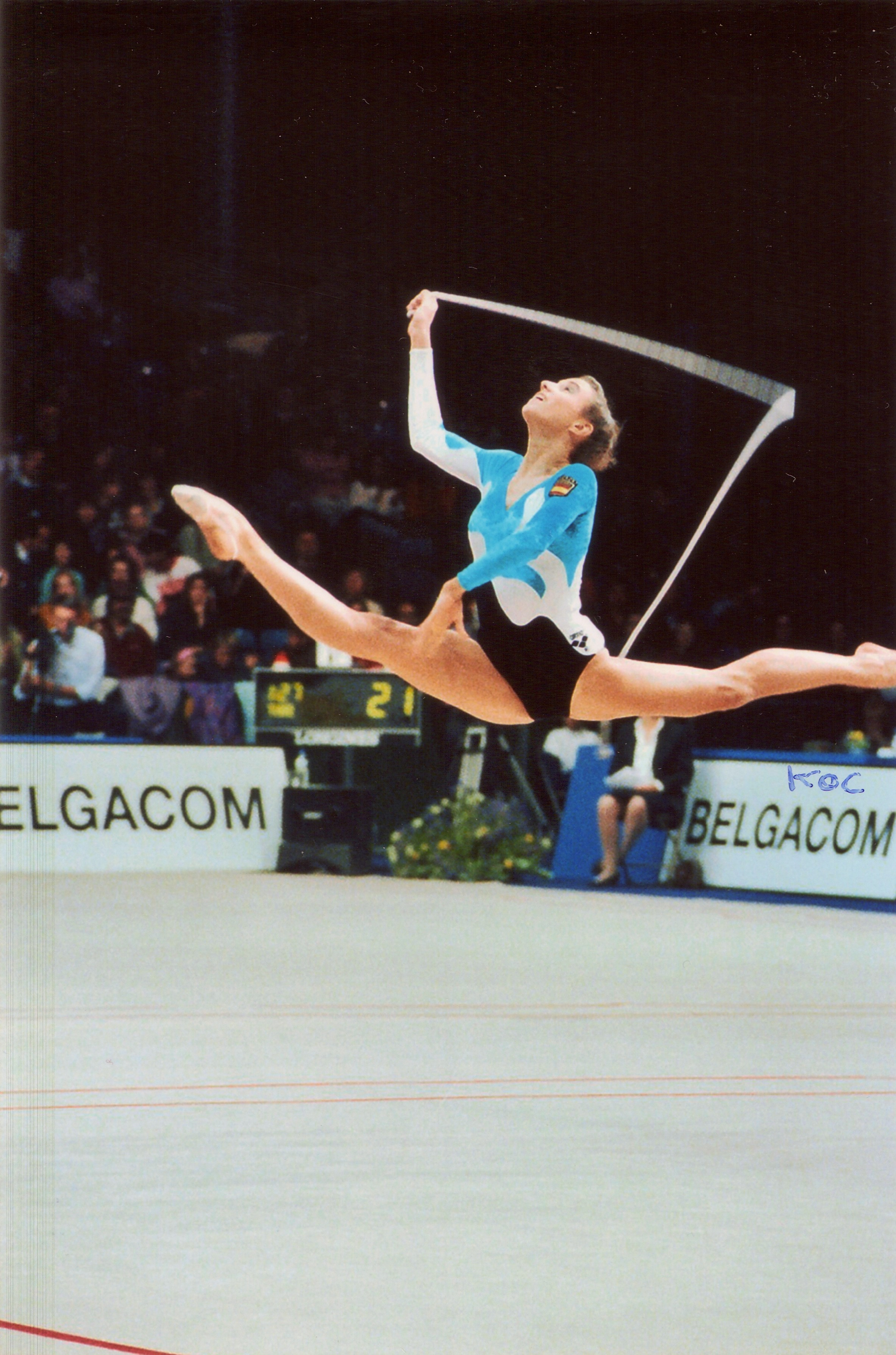
Rope

- Artistic gymnastics
  - Only men
    - High bar
    - Parallel bars
    - Pommel horse
    - Still rings
  - Only women
    - Balance beam
    - Uneven bars
  - Both men and women
    - Floor
    - Vault
  - Former
    - Flying rings
    - Rope climbing
- Rhythmic gymnastics
  - Ball
  - Clubs
  - Hoop
  - Ribbon
  - Rope
- Trampolining
  - Double mini trampoline
- Acrobalance
  - Adagio
- Acrobatic gymnastics
- Acro dance
- Aerial hoop
- Aerial silks
- Aerobic gymnastics
- Aesthetic group gymnastics
- Baton twirling
- Juggling
- Para-gymnastics
- Parkour
  - Freerunning
- Pole sports
  - Mallakhamba
  - Pole dance
- Rope jumping
- Slacklining
- TeamGym
- Trapeze
  - Flying trapeze
  - Static trapeze
- Tumbling
- Tricking
- Wheel gymnastics
  - Cyr wheel

== Kite sports ==
- Hang gliding
- Kite buggy
- Kite fighting
- Kite ice skating
- Kite landboarding
- Kitesurfing
- Parasailing
- Snowkiting
- Sport kite (Stunt kite)

== Motorsports ==
Sports involving manned motorized vehicles

=== Aircraft ===
Aerobatic maneuver

- Aerobatics
  - Competition aerobatics
- Air racing
  - Formula One Air Racing
  - Formula V Air Racing
- Powered gliding
  - Powered hang gliding
  - Powered paragliding
- Stunt flying
  - Barnstorming
  - Wing walking

=== Motorboat ===
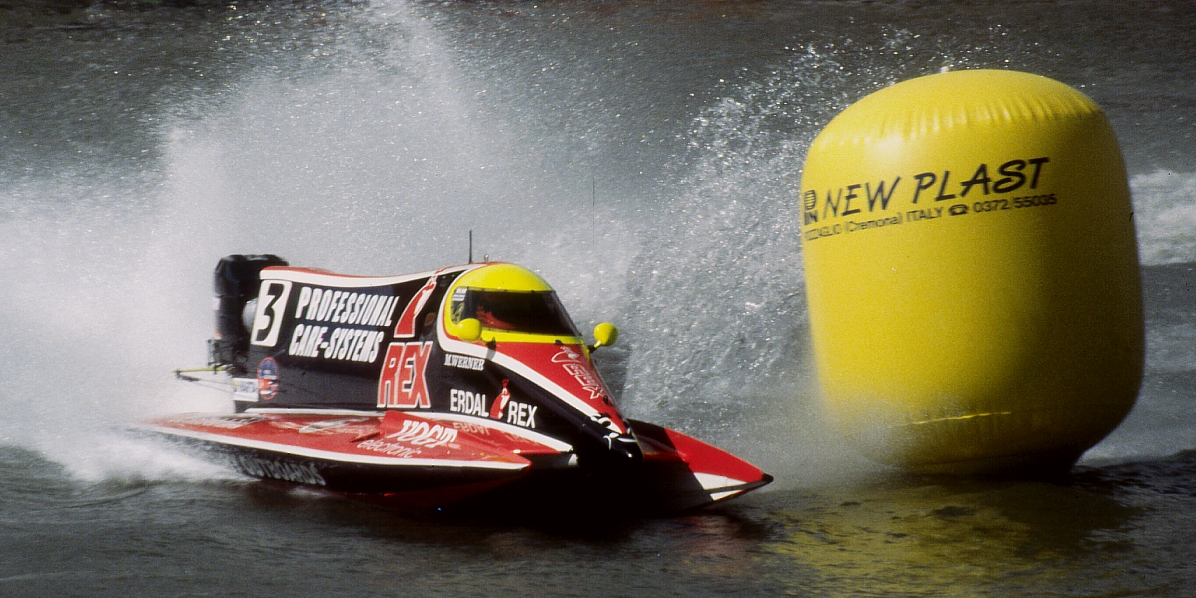
Formula 1 motorboat

- Drag boat racing
- Hydroplane racing
- Inshore powerboat racing
  - F1 powerboat racing
- Jet sprint boat racing
- Offshore powerboat racing
  - Class 1 powerboat racing
- Personal watercraft

=== Terrestrial vehicles ===
==== Automobile ====
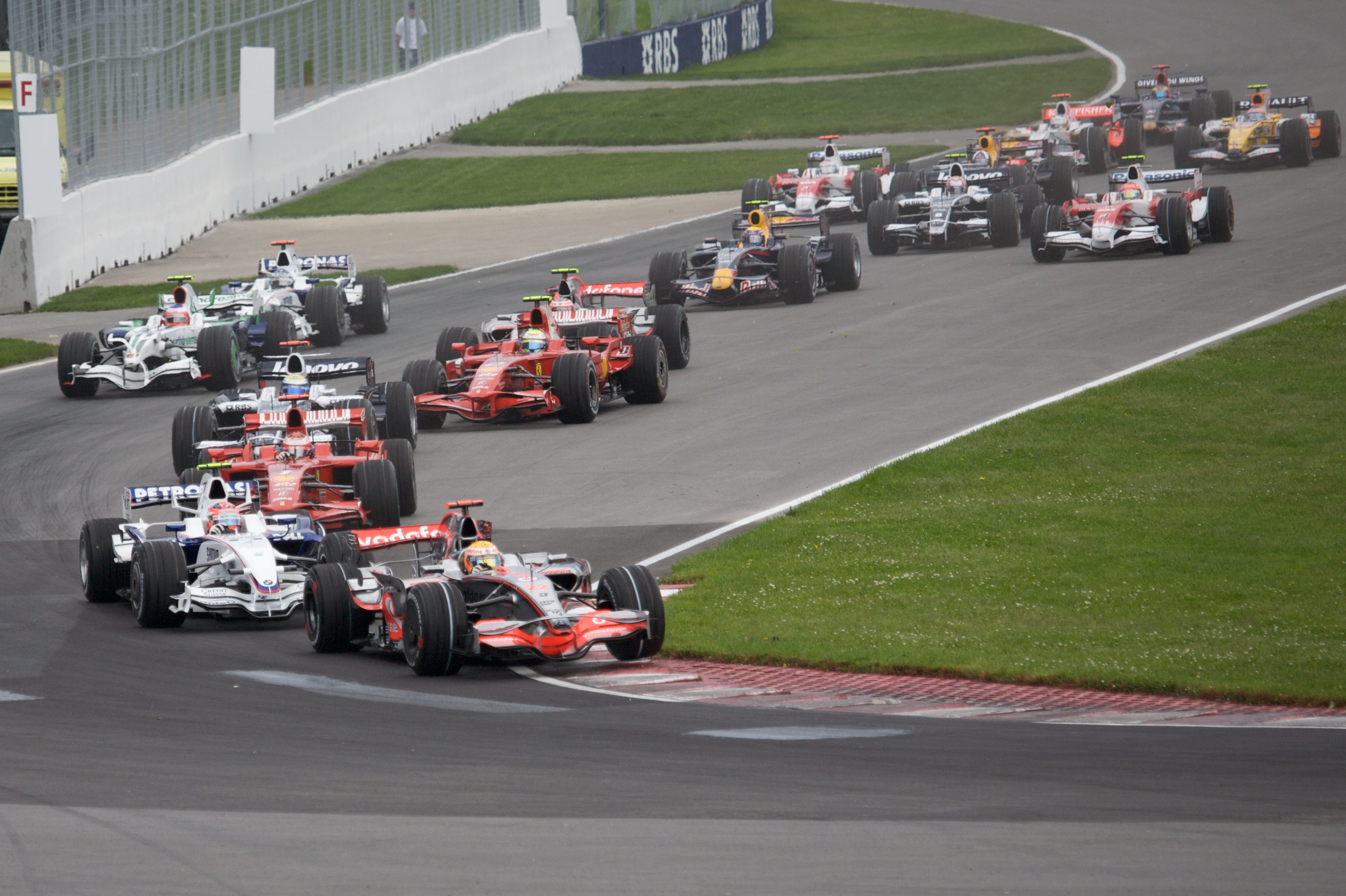
The start of a Formula One race in 2008

- Formula racing
  - Formula One
  - Formula E
  - Formula Two
  - Formula Three
  - Formula 4
  - Formula Regional
  - Formula Student
  - Formula Libre
  - American open-wheel car racing
    - IndyCar Series
    - Indy NXT
  - Super Formula Championship
    - Super Formula Lights
    - Formula Regional Japanese Championship
    - Formula Beat
- Autoball
- Auto polo
- Autocross (a.k.a. Slalom)
- Autograss
- Banger racing
- Board track racing
- Demolition derby
- Desert racing
- Dirt track racing
- Drag racing
- Drifting
- Endurance racing
- Folkrace
- Hillclimbing
- Baseball racing
- Kart racing
- Land speed records
- Lawn mower racing
- Legends car racing
- Midget car racing
- Monster truck
- Mud bogging
- Off-road racing
- Pickup truck racing
- Production car racing
- Race of Champions
- Rally raid
- Rallycross
- Rallying
- Regularity rally
- Road racing
- Short track motor racing
- Sports car racing
- Sprint car racing
- Street racing
- Stock car racing
- Time attack
- Tractor pulling
- Tractor race
- Touring car racing
- Truck racing
- Vintage racing
- Wheelstand competition

==== Motorcycle ====
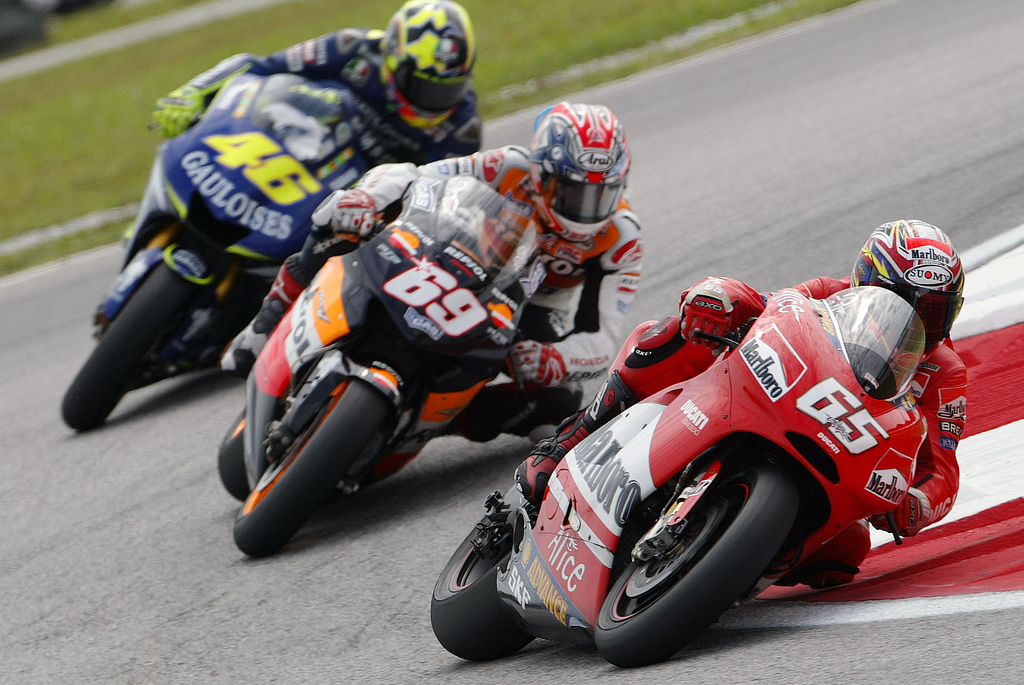
MotoGP racing

- Auto Race
- Board track racing
- Cross-country rally
- Endurance racing
- Enduro
- Freestyle motocross
- Grand Prix motorcycle racing
- Grasstrack
- Hillclimbing
- Ice speedway
- Indoor enduro
- Motoball
- Motocross
- Motorcycle drag racing
  - Electric drag racing
- Motorcycle speedway
- Motorcycle stunt riding
- Off-roading
- Rally raid
- Road racing
- Stunt riding
- Superbike racing
- Supercross
- Supermoto
- Supersport racing
- Sidecar racing
- Track racing
- Trial
- TT racing
- Free-style moto

==== Others ====
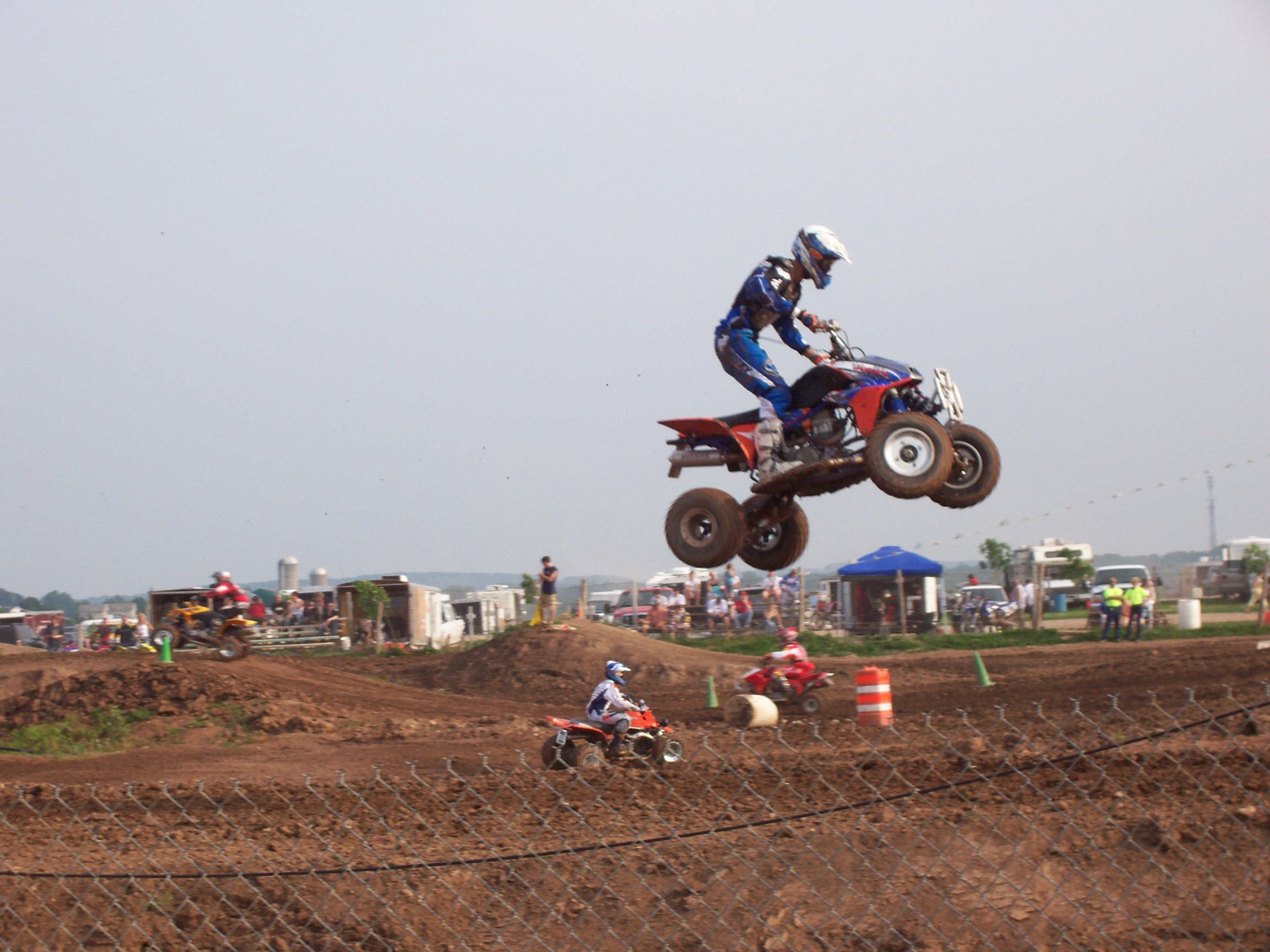
ATV racing on a motocross track

- All-terrain vehicle competition
- Electric bike racing
- Electric scooter racing
- Electric skateboard racing
- Electric unicycle race
- Hoverboarding
- Ice racing
- Monowheel run
- Rickshaw run
- Segway polo
- Snocross
- Snowmobiling
- Snowmobile skipping
- Whirlyball

== Orienteering ==
- Amateur radio direction finding (Radio Orienteering)
  - Fox Oring
  - Radio Orienteering in a Compact Area
- Canoe orienteering
- Car orienteering
- Geocaching
- Geohashing
- Letterboxing
- Mounted orienteering
- Orienteering
  - Foot orienteering
  - Mountain bike orienteering
  - Ski orienteering
  - Trail orienteering
- Rogaining
- Urban exploration
- Waymarking

== Pedal vehicle ==
Human-powered vehicles propelled by pedals

=== Cycling ===
Sports using bicycles, quadracycles, tricycles or unicycles.

==== Bicycle ====
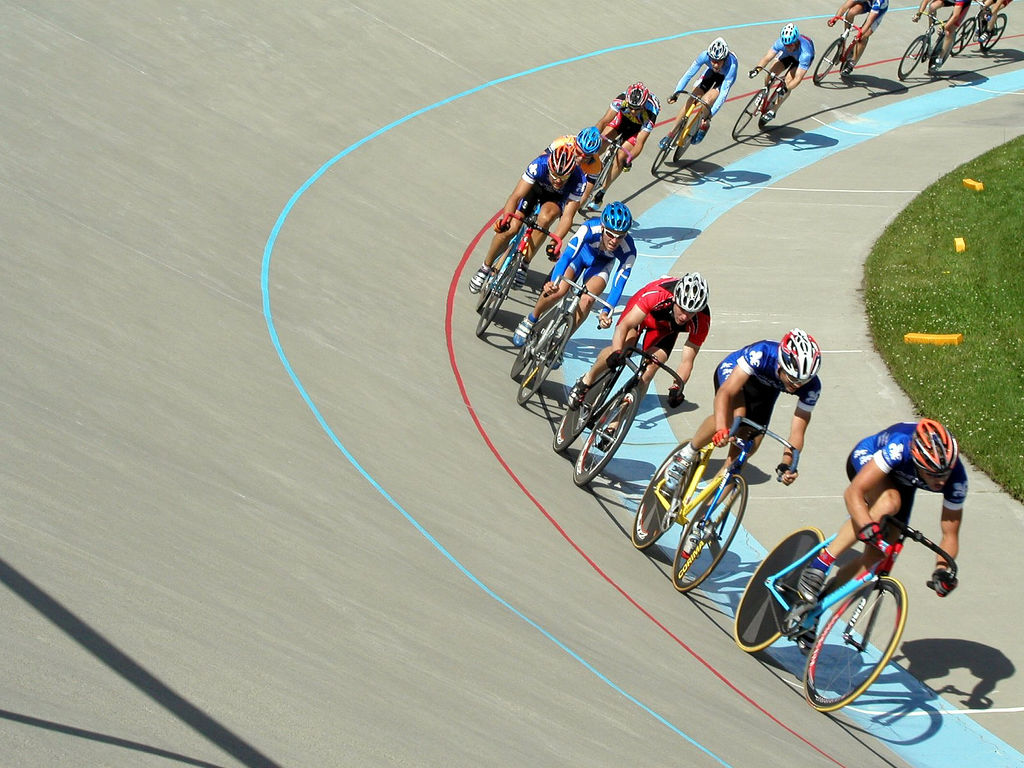
A track cycling race

- Artistic cycling
- BMX
  - BMX racing
  - Freestyle BMX
- Cycle ball
- Cycle polo
  - Hardcourt Bike Polo
- Cycle speedway
- Cyclo-cross
- Dirt jumping
- Downhill mountain biking
- Freestyle fixed gear
- Bike Trials
- Mountain biking
- Recumbent bicycle racing
- Road bicycle racing
- Track cycling
- Underwater cycling

==== Quadracycle ====
- Pedal car racing

==== Tricycle ====
- Handcycle
- Recumbent tricycle racing
- Wheelchair racing

==== Unicycle ====
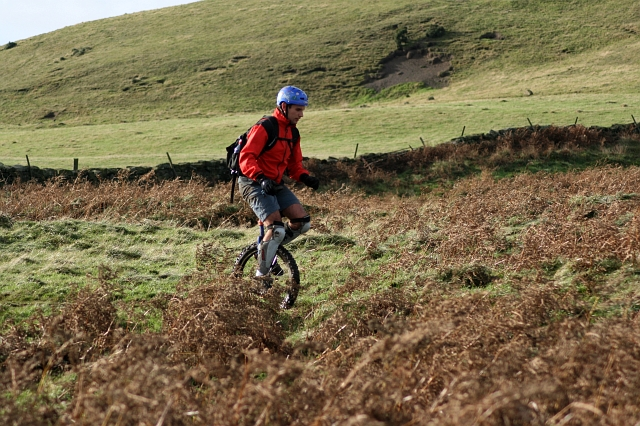
Mountain unicycle

- Icetrack cycling
- Mountain unicycling
- Street unicycling
- Unicycling
- Unicycle basketball
- Unicycle football
- Unicycle hockey
- Unicycle polo
- Unicycle trials

=== Watercraft ===
- Pedal boat racing

== Racing ==
- Gravity racer
- Running
  - Marathon
  - Sprint
  - Mascot race
- Skating
  - Inline speed skating
  - Speed skating
    - Ice cross downhill

== Shooting sports ==
=== Archery ===
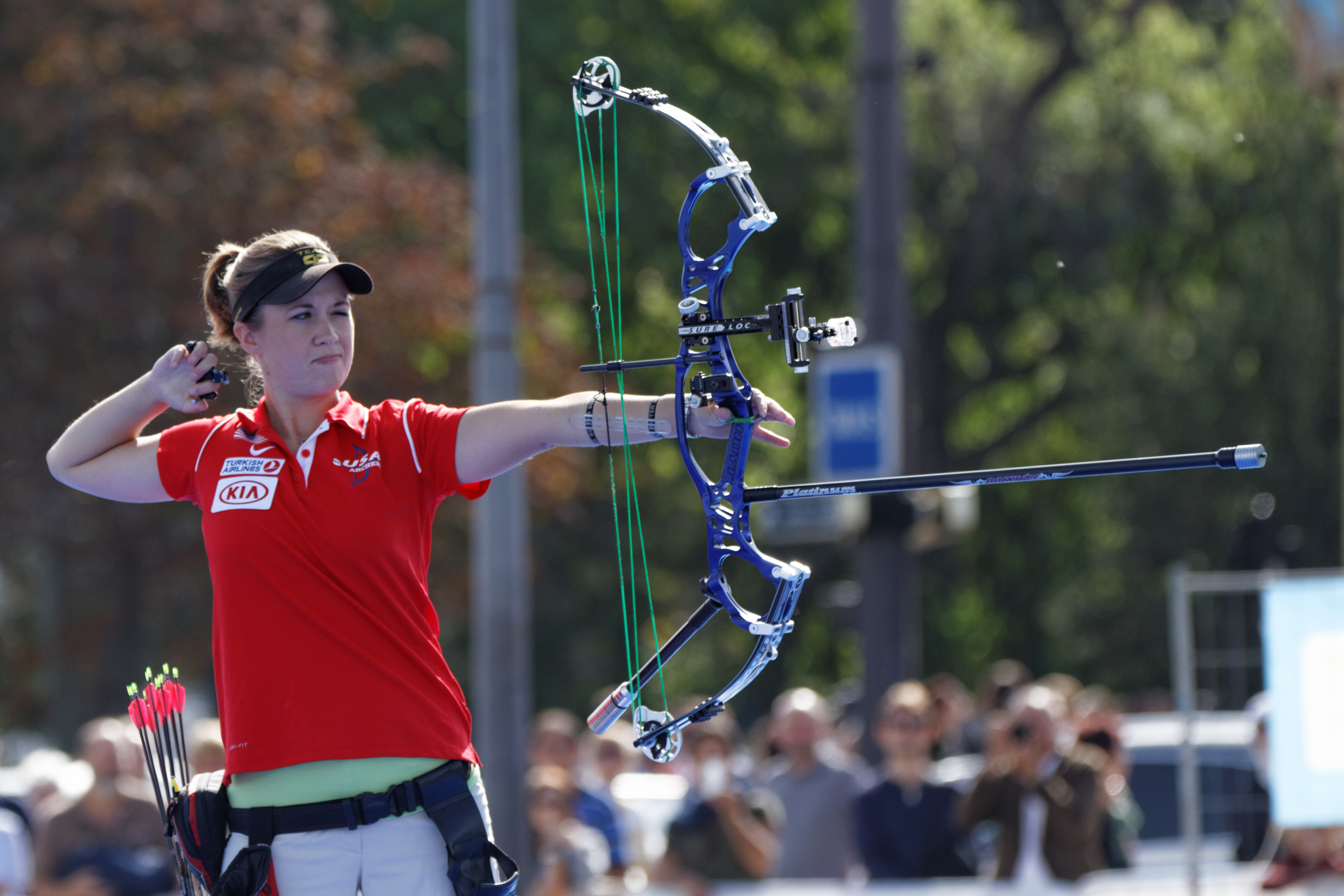
Compound bow

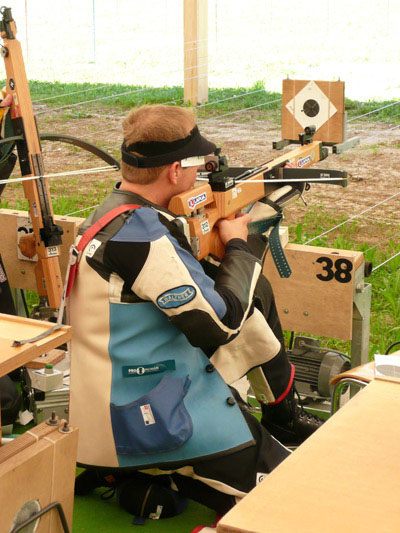
Crossbow competition

- Modern competitive archery
  - 3D archery
  - Target archery
    - Recurve bow
    - Compound bow
  - Field archery
  - Clout archery
  - Flight archery
- Dartchery
- Indoor archery
- Match crossbow
- Popinjay
- Traditional
  - Gungdo
  - Kyūdō
  - Mounted archery
    - Yabusame
- Combat archery

=== Gun sports ===
Sports using guns (firearms, air guns, etc.).

==== Individual ====
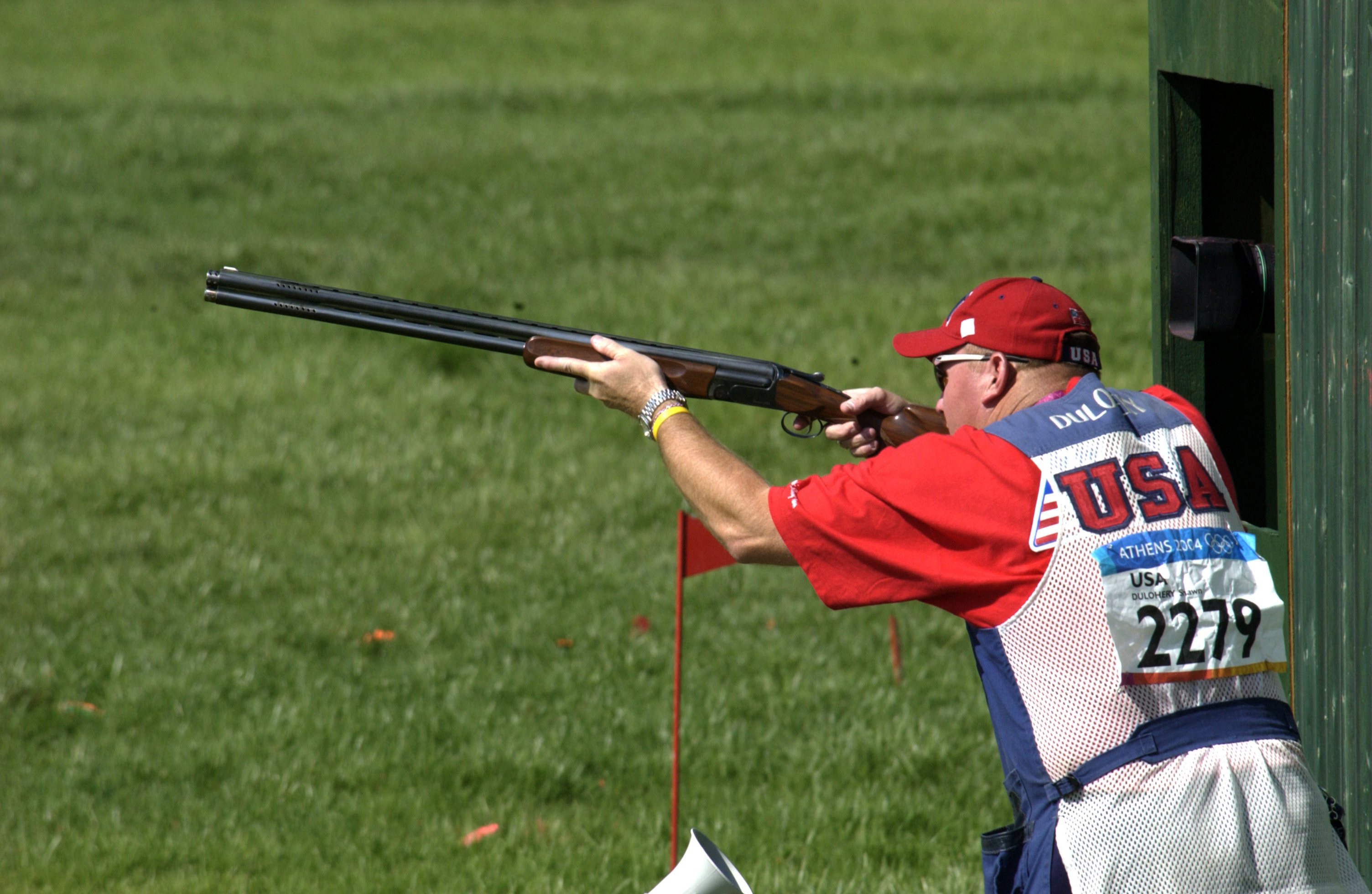
Skeet shooting

- Clay pigeon shooting
  - Skeet shooting
  - Trap shooting
  - Sporting clays
- Slingshotting
- Bullseye shooting
  - Rifle
    - ISSF rifle events
    - Fullbore target rifle
    - High power rifle
    - Benchrest shooting
    - Paralympic rifle events
  - Handgun
    - ISSF pistol events
    - Paralympic pistol events
- Field shooting
  - Precision rifle competition
  - Precision Rifle Series
  - Field target
  - Metallic silhouette shooting
  - ICFRA Palma and F-Class
  - Plinking
- Practical shooting
  - International Practical Shooting Confederation (IPSC)
  - International Defensive Pistol Association (IDPA)
  - Multigun
  - Cowboy action shooting
  - Pistol dueling

==== Skirmish ====
- Airsoft
- Laser tag
- Paintball
  - Scenario paintball
  - Speedball
  - Woodsball

=== Athletic hybrid ===
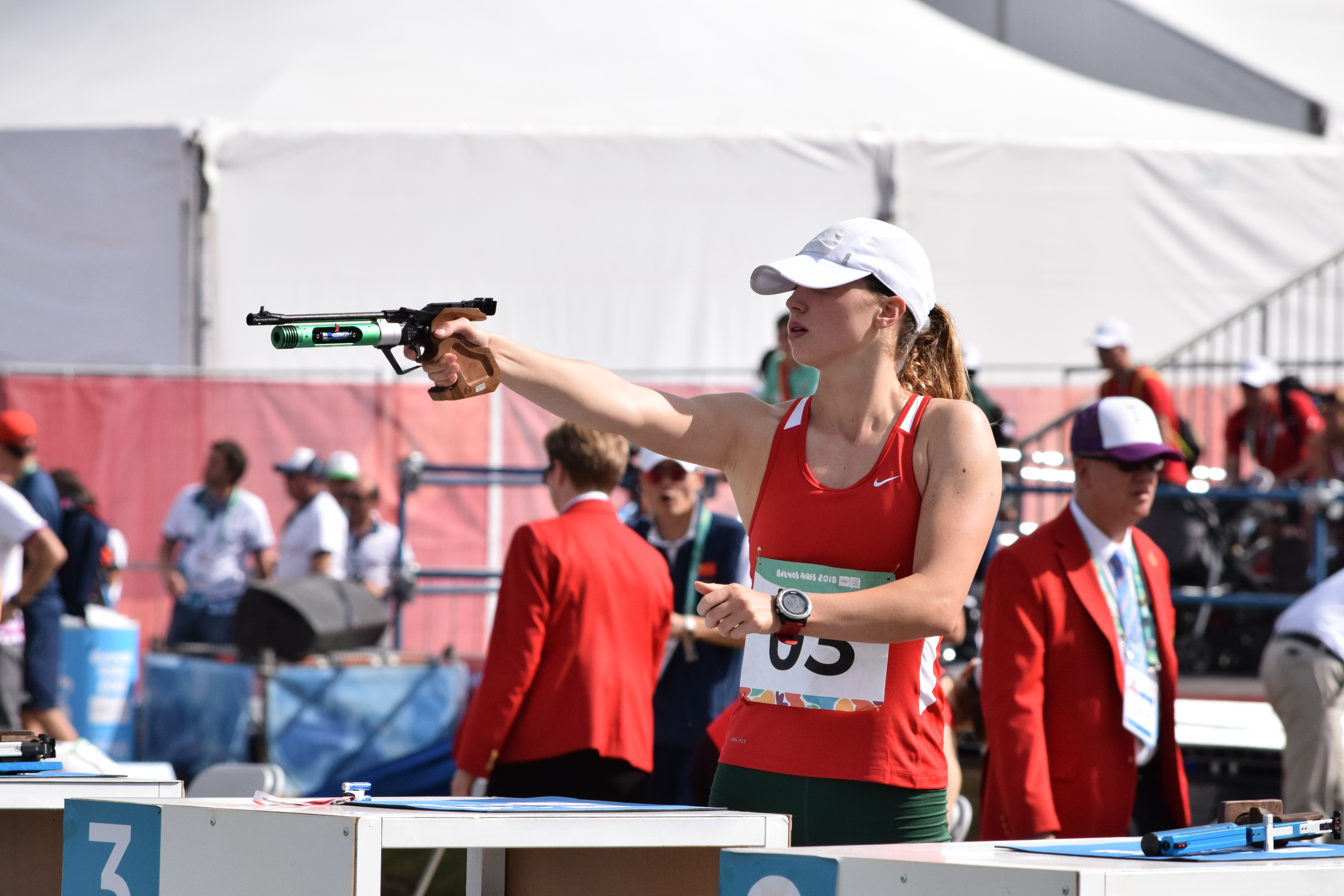
Laser-run

- Air baseball
- Biathlon
- Bowling
- Field running
- Ice baseball
- Laser-run
- Military patrol
- Modern pentathlon
- Moose biathlon
- Orienteering shooting
- Pistol skiing
- Ski field shooting
- Summer biathlon
- Target sprint
- Triathle
- Underwater target shooting
- Run archery
- Water baseball

== Skating sports ==
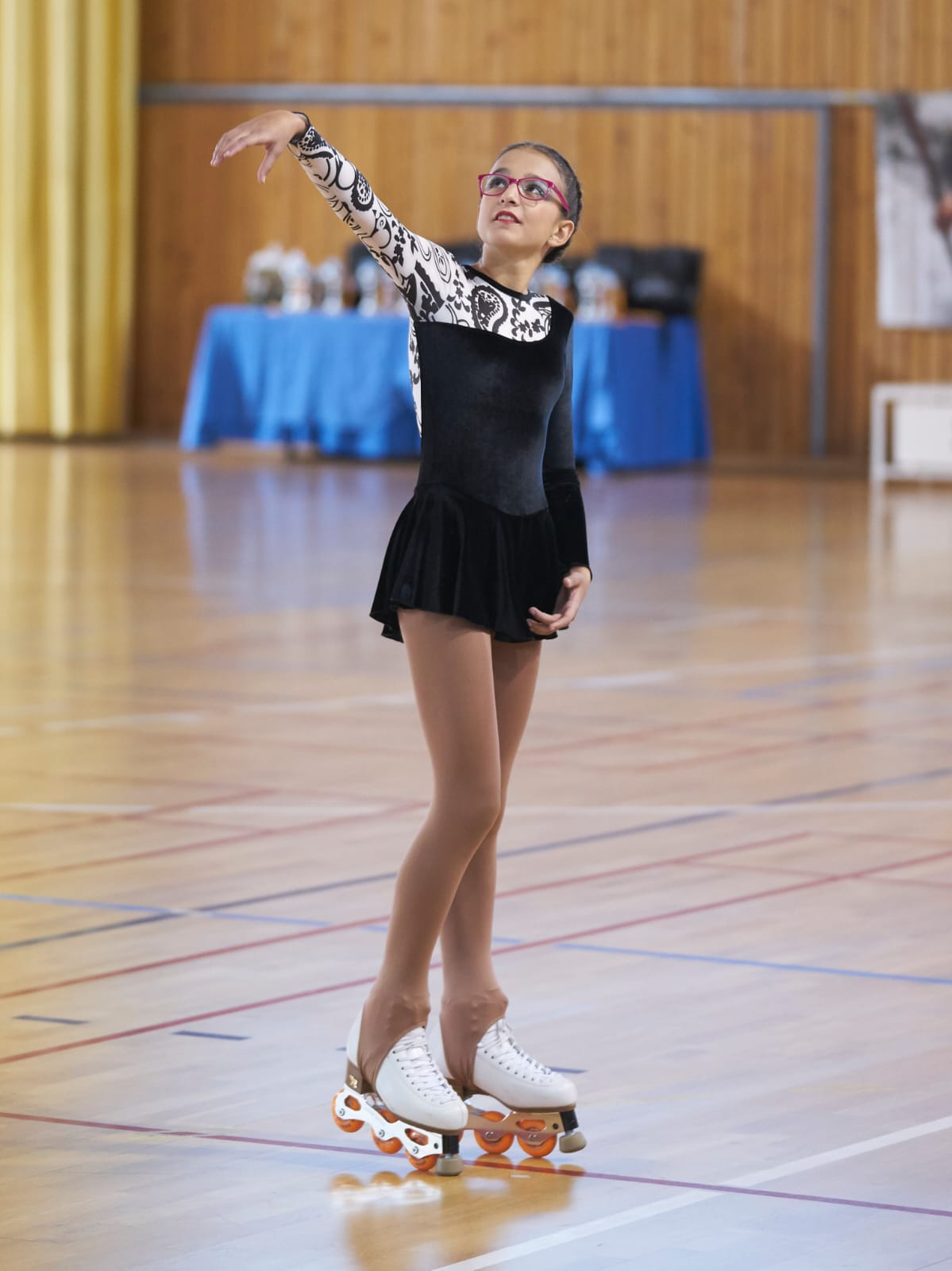
Inline figure skating

- Ice skating
  - Figure skating
    - Freeskating
    - Ice dancing
    - Single skating
    - Pair skating
    - Synchronized skating
    - Four skating
    - Ice theatre
  - Hockey
    - Bandy
      - Rink bandy
    - Ice hockey
    - Ringette
    - Rinkball
  - Speed skating
    - Ice cross downhill
    - Ice skating marathon
    - Long-track speed skating
    - Short-track speed skating
  - Tour skating
- Roller sports
  - Freestyle scootering
  - Roller skating
    - Artistic roller skating
    - Inline skating
      - Aggressive inline skating
      - Vert skating
      - Freestyle slalom skating
      - Inline slalom/Alpine skating
      - Inline figure skating
      - Inline speed skating
      - Inline hockey
      - Roll ball
      - Roller soccer
    - Quad
      - Jam skating
      - Rink hockey
      - Roller derby
    - Road skating
    - Roller basketball
  - Roller skiing
  - Skateboarding
    - Casterboarding
    - Freeboard (skateboard)
    - Freestyle skateboarding
    - Grass surfing
    - Longboarding
    - Mountainboarding
    - Skateboarding trick
    - Skatepark
    - Slalom skateboarding
    - Snakeboarding
    - Street skateboarding
    - Streetluge
    - Vert skateboarding

== Snow sports ==
=== Skiing ===
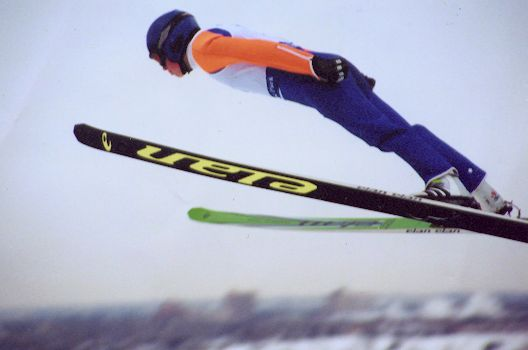
A ski jumper using the V-style

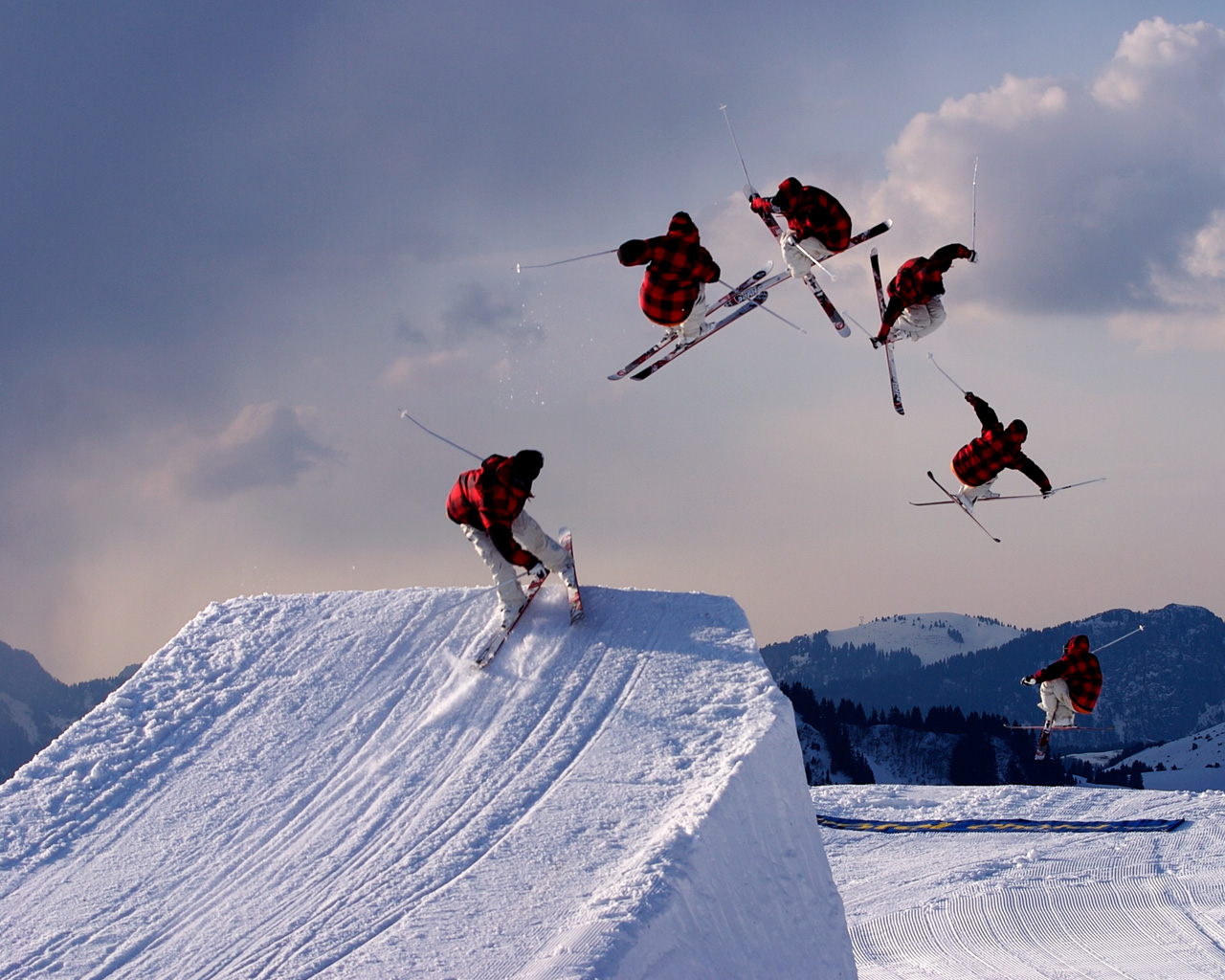
Freestyle skiing

- Alpine skiing
  - Downhill
  - Super-G
  - Freeskiing
  - Giant slalom
  - Slalom
  - Alpine skiing combined
  - Para-alpine skiing
  - Freestyle skiing
    - Aerials
    - Moguls
    - Halfpipe
    - Slopestyle
    - Ski cross
    - Ski ballet
  - Speed skiing
- Backcountry skiing
- Monoski
- Nordic skiing
  - Cross-country skiing
  - Ski jumping
  - Nordic combined
  - Telemark skiing
- Ice sledge racing
- Ski mountaineering
- Ski touring
- Skijoring
- Teleboard
- Telemark skiing
- Off-season variants
  - Grass skiing
  - Roller skiing
  - Inline slalom/Alpine skating

=== Sled sports ===
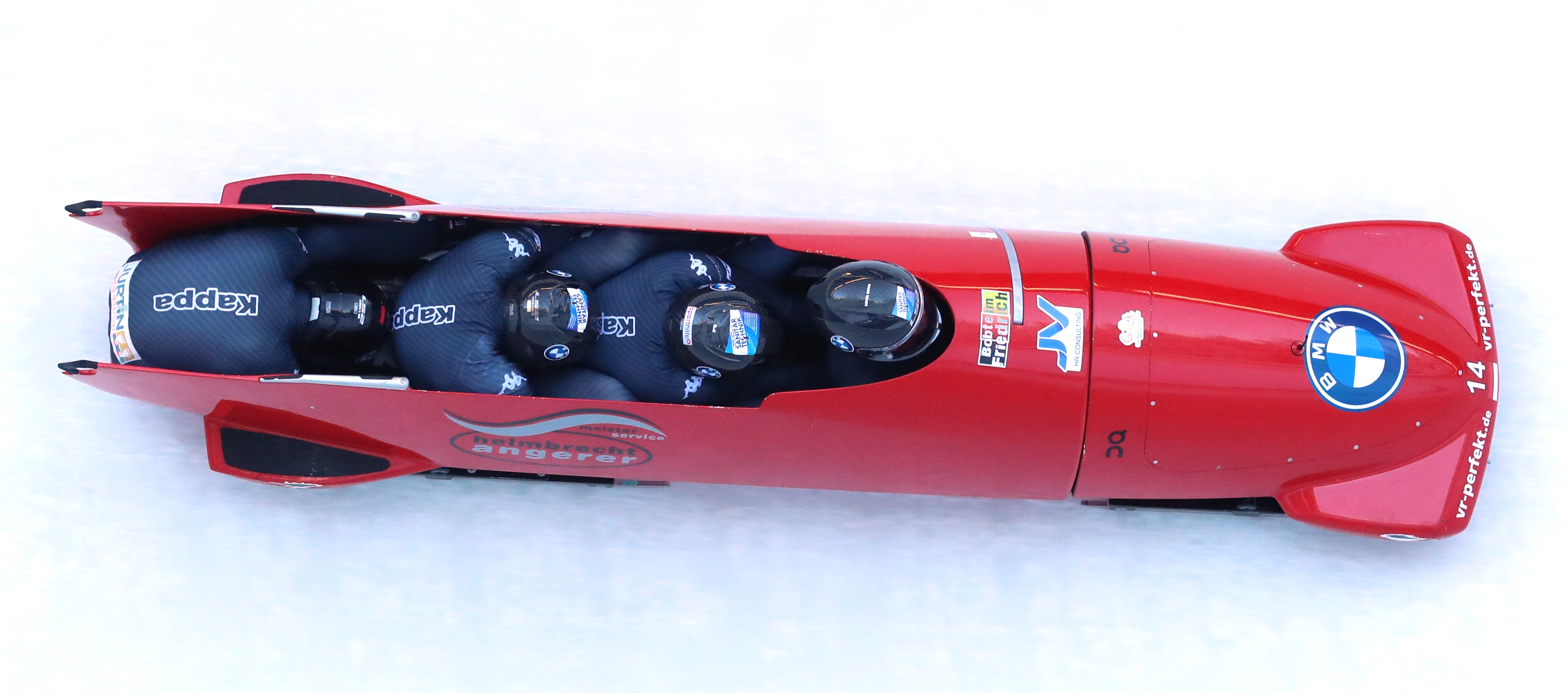
Bobsled

- Bobsleigh
- Jack jumping
- Luge
- Shovel racing
- Skibobbing
- Skeleton
- Snow tubing
- Toboggan
- Wok racing

== Stacking ==
- Card stacking
- Dice stacking
- Jenga
- Sport stacking

== Strength sports ==
- Arm Wrestling
- Hyrox
- Powerlifting
- Strongman
- Thumb war
- Toe Wrestling
- Weightlifting
- Wrestling

== Tag games ==
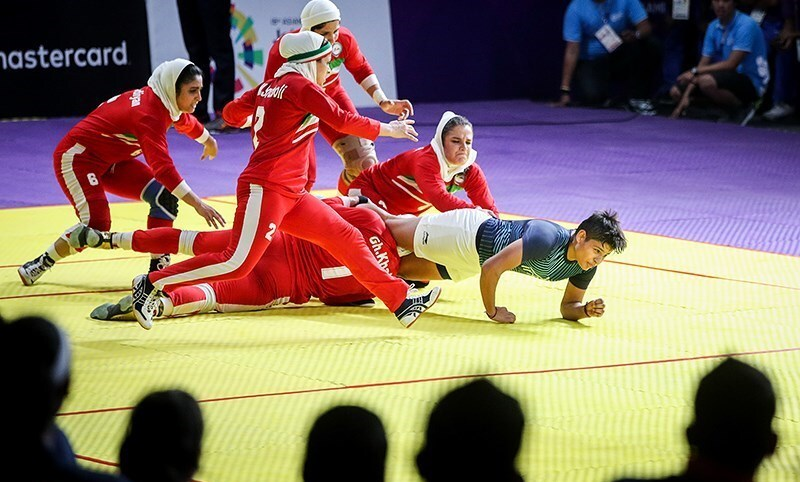
Kabaddi

- Atya patya
- Bo-taoshi
- British Bulldog (American Eagle; Australian Dingo)
- Capture the flag
- Darebase
- Hana Ichi Monme
- Hide-and-seek
- Jugger
- Kabaddi
- Kho kho
- Kick the can
- Langdi
- Marco Polo
- Oztag
- Red Rover
- Seven stones
- Surr
- Tag
- World Chase Tag

== Walking ==
- Hiking
  - Backpacking (hiking)
  - Off-trail hiking
  - Naked hiking
- Nordic walking
- Racewalking
- Walking

== Water sports ==
These sports use water (a river, pool, etc.).

=== Aquatic ball sports ===
==== Surface ====
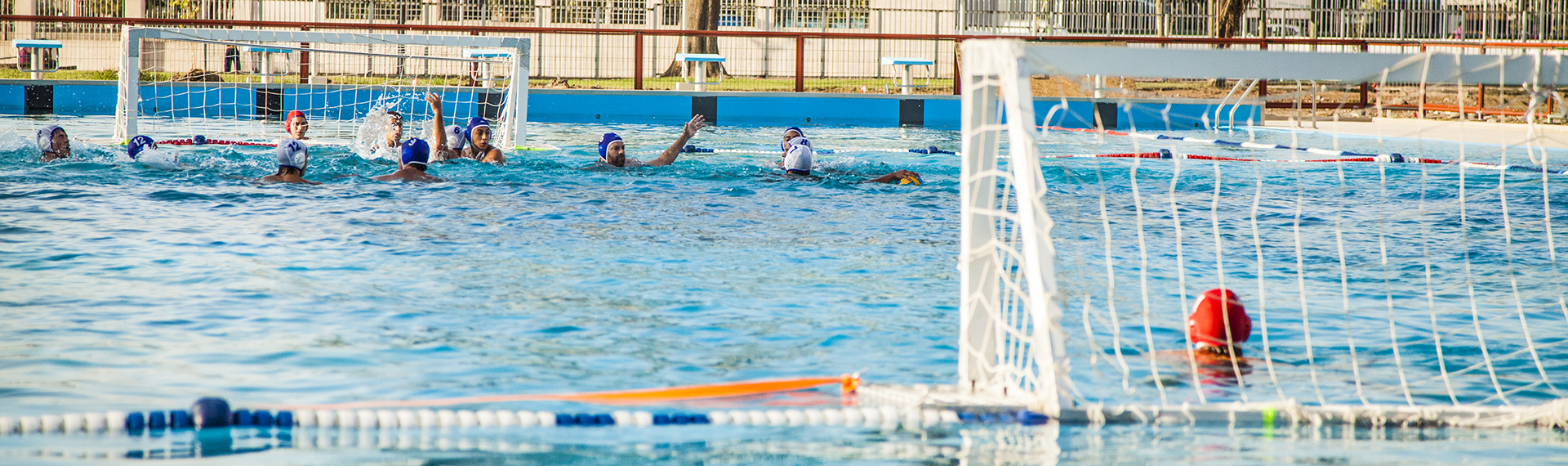
Water polo

- Water polo
  - Inner tube water polo
  - Beach water polo
- Canoe polo
- Water basketball
- Water volleyball
  - Biribol
- Stone skipping
- Waboba

==== Underwater ====
- Underwater football
- Underwater rugby
- Underwater hockey
- Underwater ice hockey

=== Competitive swimming ===
Swimming strokes

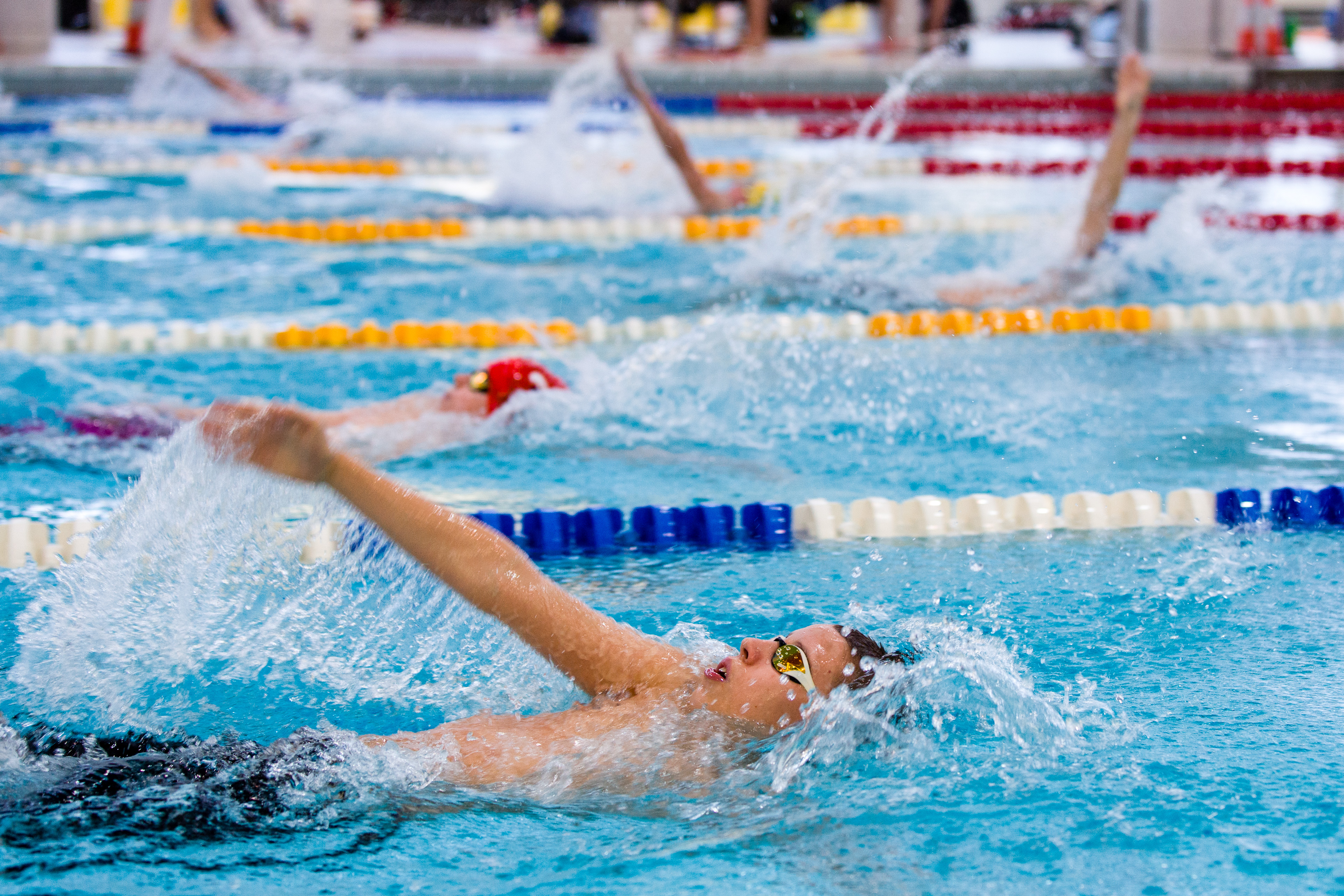
Back crawl

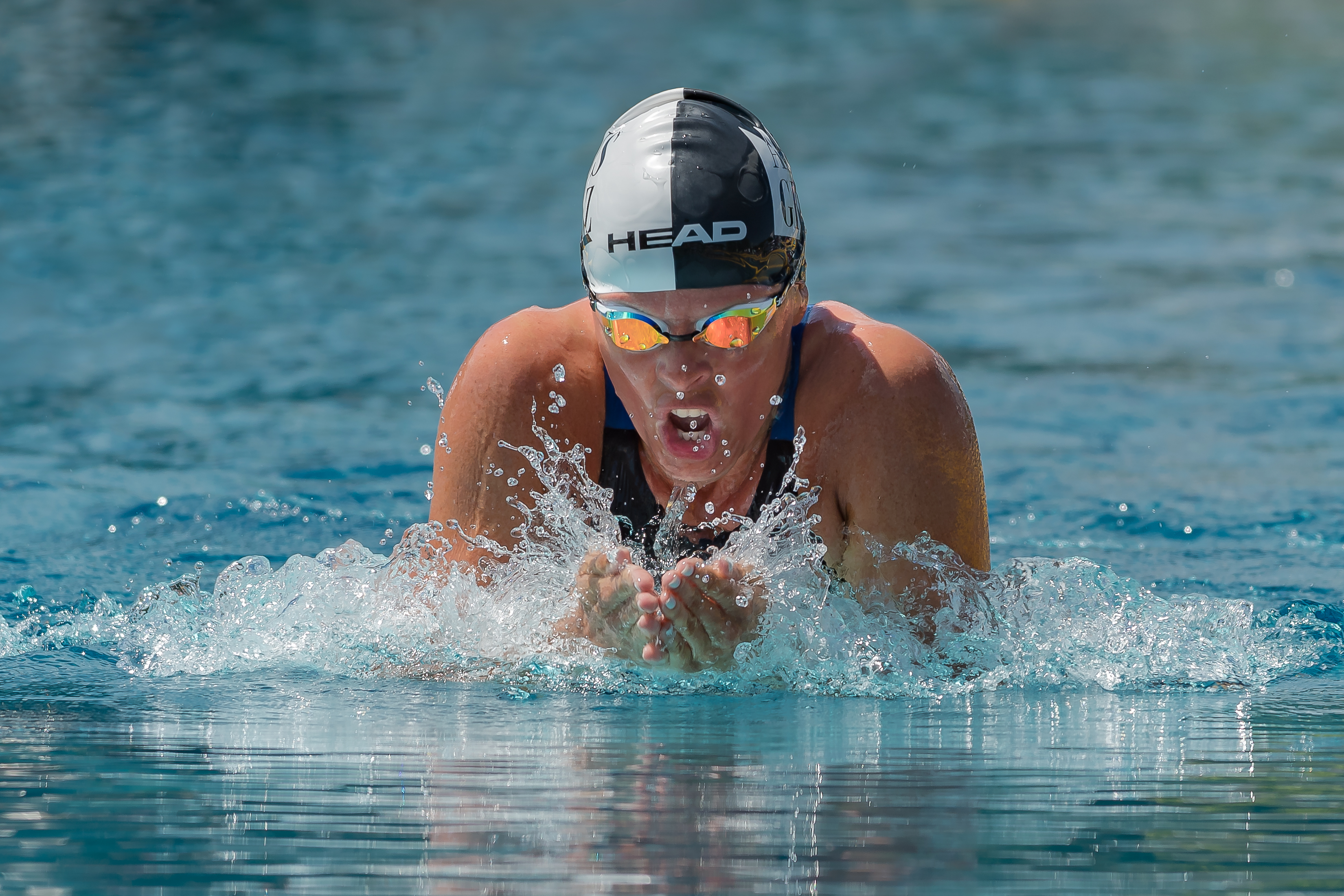
Breaststroke

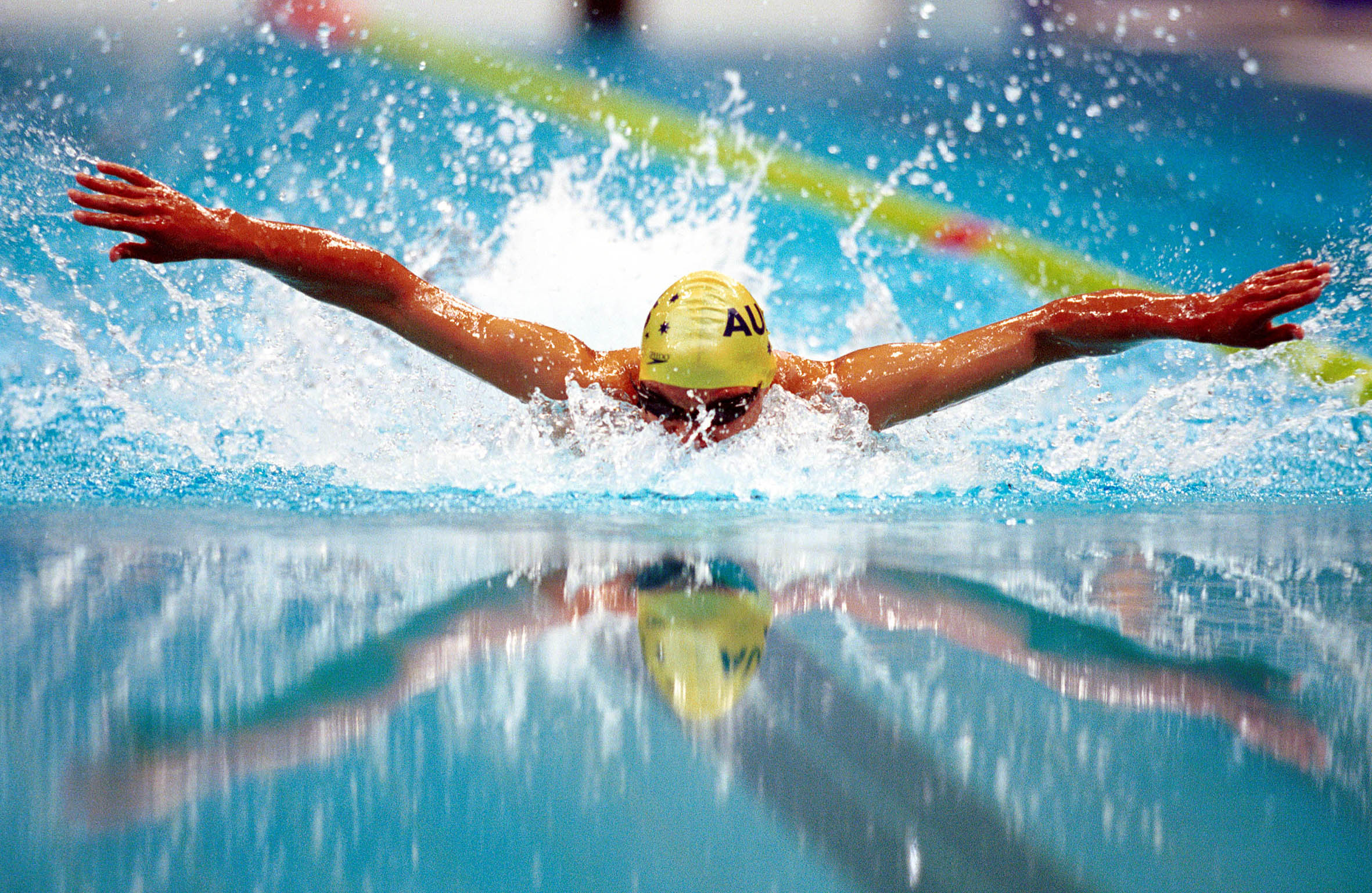
Fly

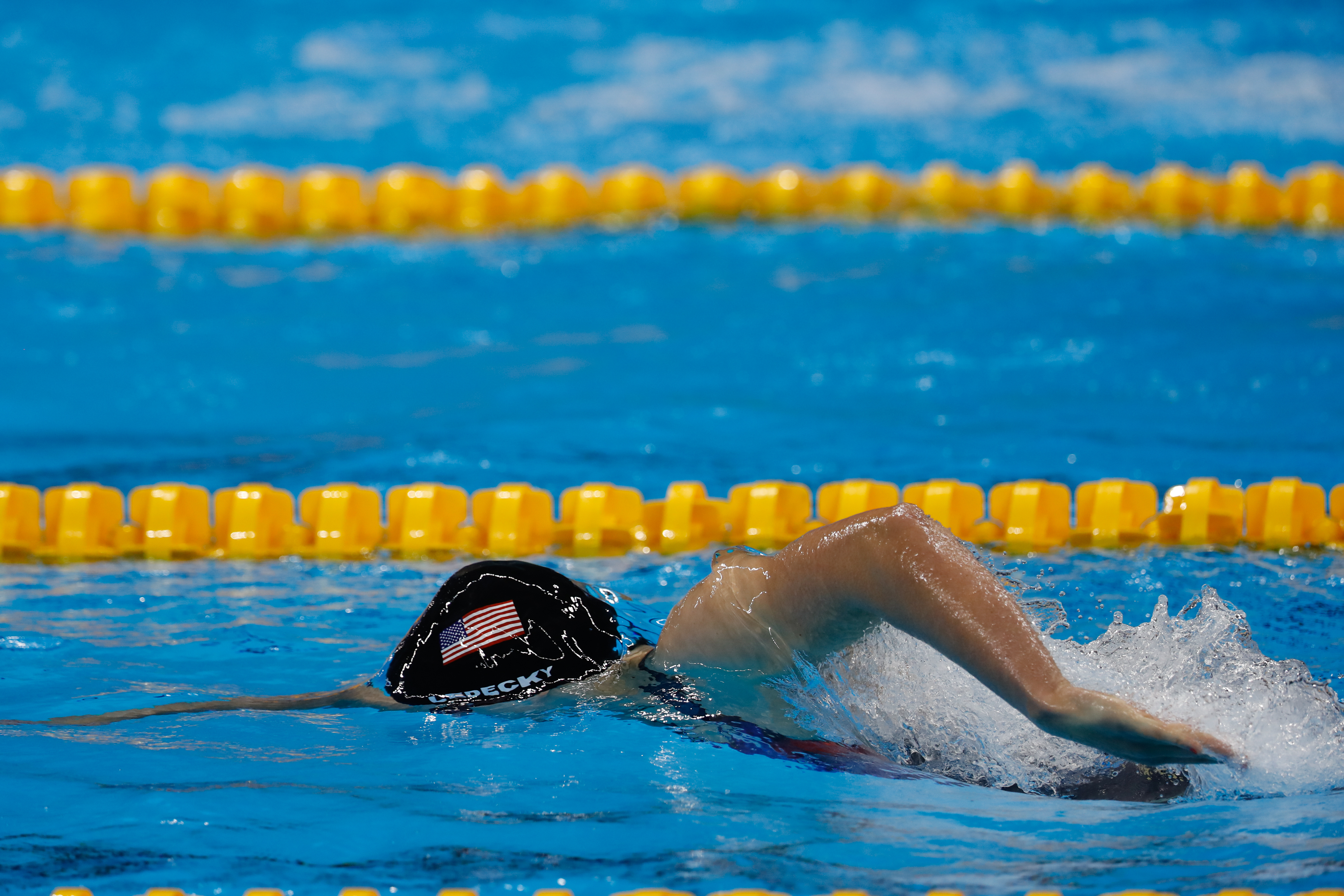
Front crawl

- Swimming stroke
  - Backstroke
  - Breaststroke
  - Butterfly stroke
  - Freestyle swimming
    - Front crawl
  - Sidestroke
- Individual medley
- Synchronized swimming
- Medley relay

==== Kindred activities ====
- Bifins (finswimming)
- Surface finswimming

=== Diving ===
- Cliff jumping
- Diving

=== Subsurface and recreational ===
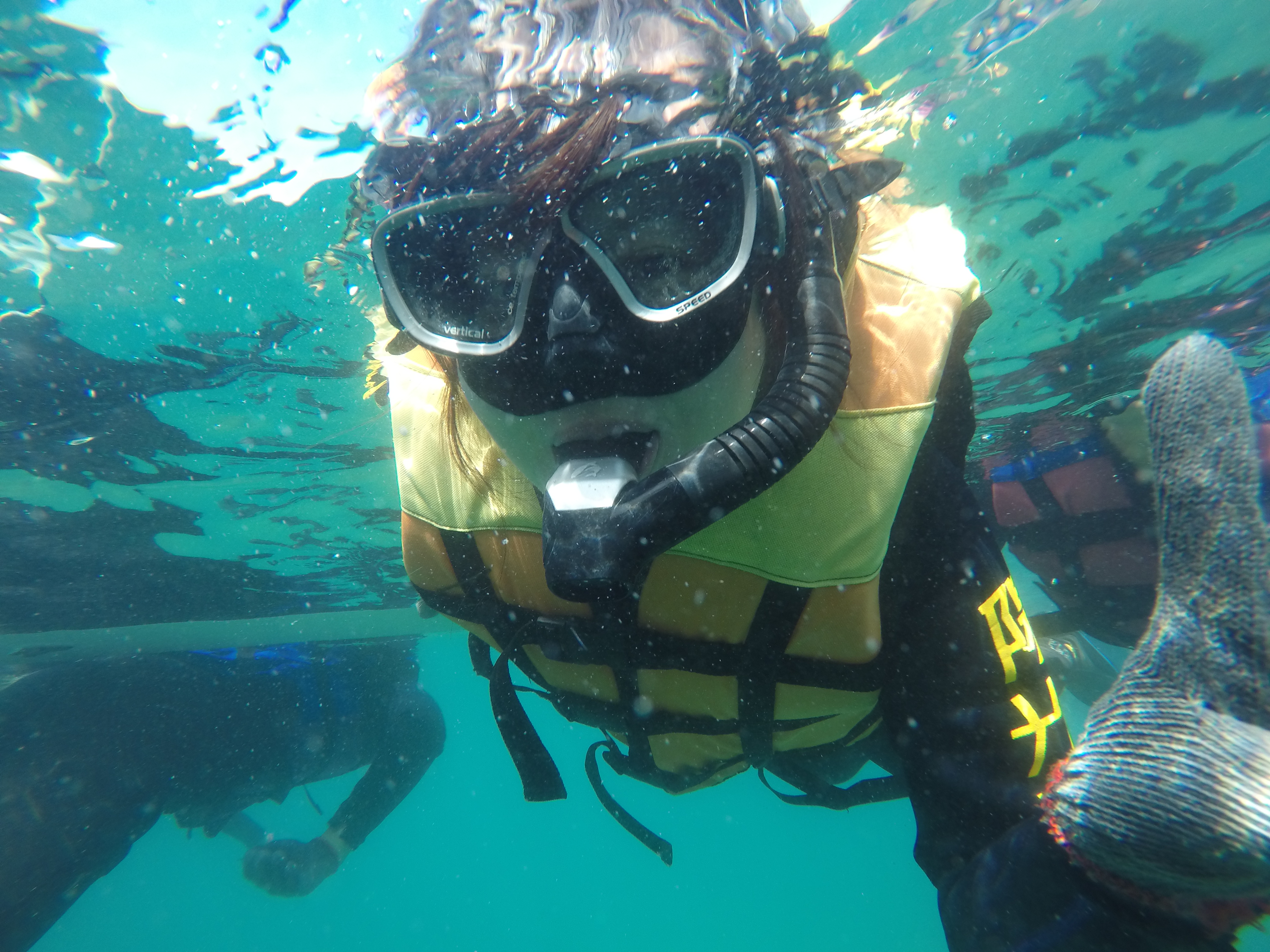
Snorkeling

- Apnoea finswimming
- Aquathlon (underwater wrestling)
- Cave diving
- Freediving
- Georgian swimming
- Immersion finswimming
- Scuba diving
- Snorkeling
- Spearfishing
- Sport diving (sport)
- Suijutsu
- Underwater orienteering
- Underwater photography (sport)
- Underwater target shooting

=== Non motorized vehicles ===
- Boat racing

==== Paddling sports ====
===== Canoeing and kayaking =====
- Canoe and kayak diving
- Canoeing
  - Canoe camping
  - Canoe marathon
  - Canoe slalom
  - Outrigger canoeing
  - Sprint canoe
  - Whitewater canoeing
- Kayaking
  - Creeking
  - Flyak
  - Freeboating
  - Sea kayaking
  - Sprint kayak
  - Surf kayaking
  - Whitewater kayaking
    - Squirt boating
  - Wildwater canoeing

===== Rafting =====
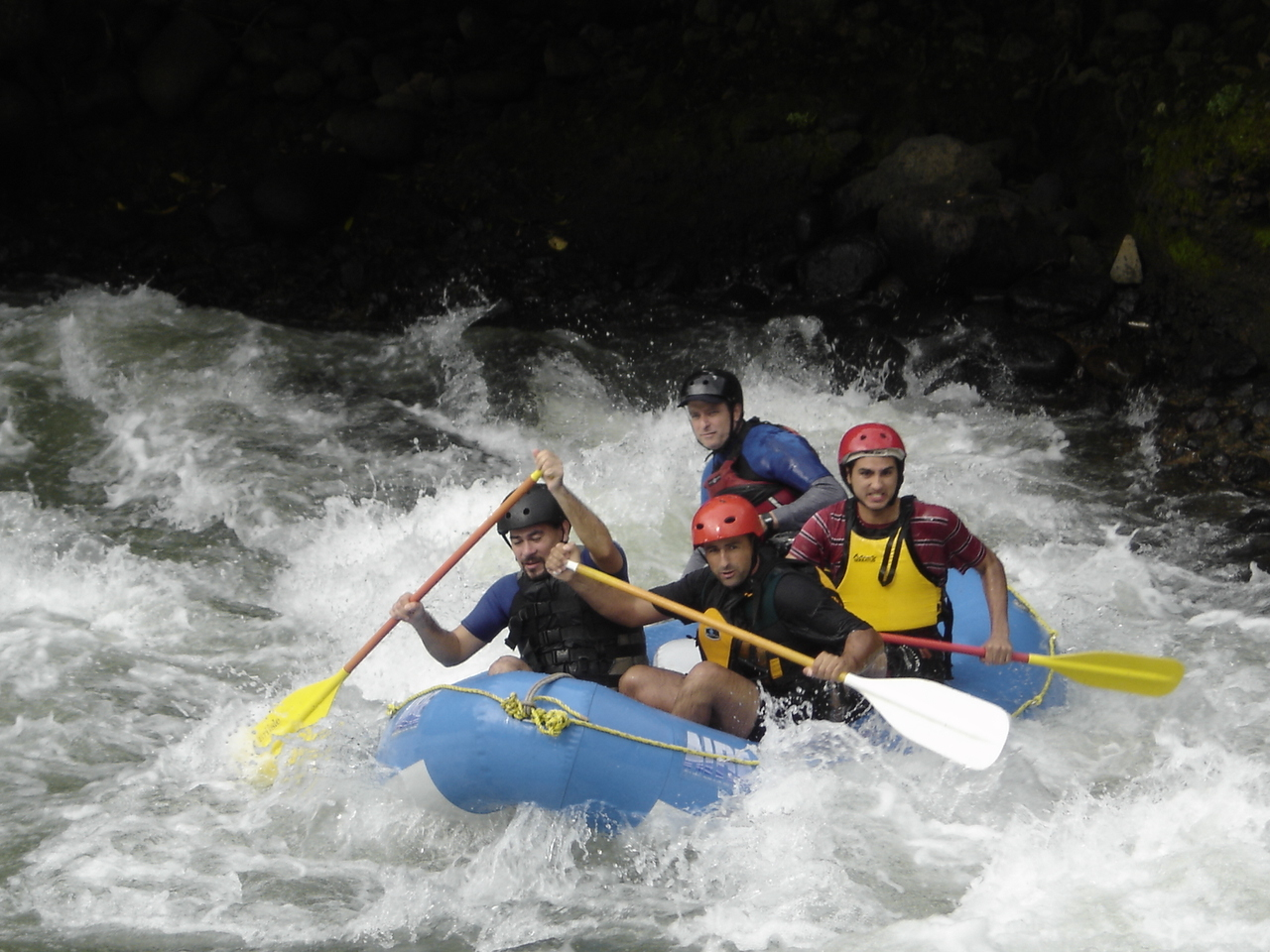
Rafting

- Rafting
- White water rafting

===== Rowing =====
- Rowing (sport)
- Gig racing
- Coastal and ocean rowing
  - Surfboat
- Single scull

===== Other paddling sports =====
- Dragon boat racing
- Standup paddleboarding

==== Sailing ====
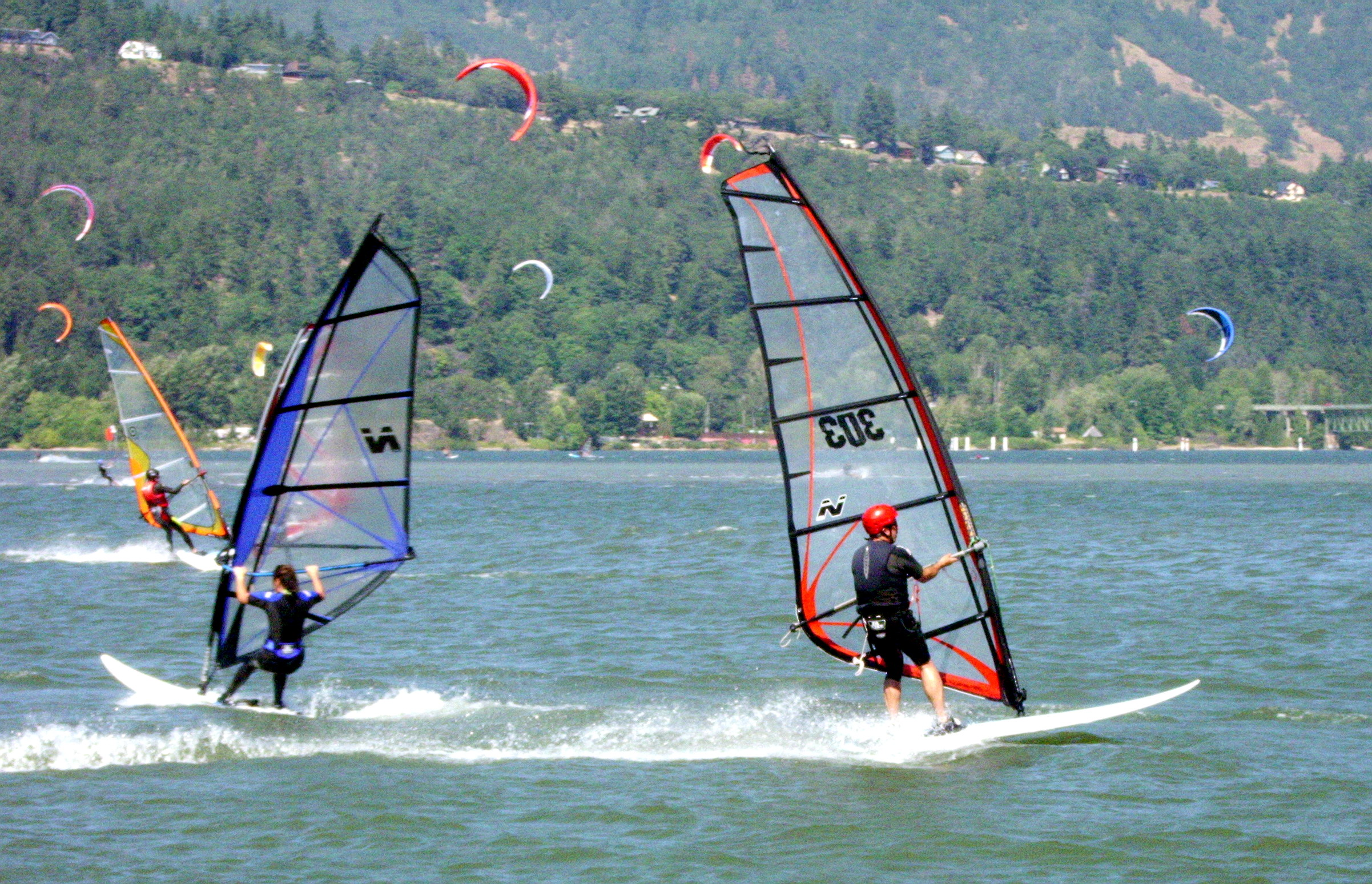
Windsurfing

- Dinghy sailing
- Fleet racing
- Ice yachting
- Kiteboarding
- Land sailing
- Land windsurfing
- Sailing
- Windsurfing
- Wing foiling
- Yacht racing

== Weightlifting ==
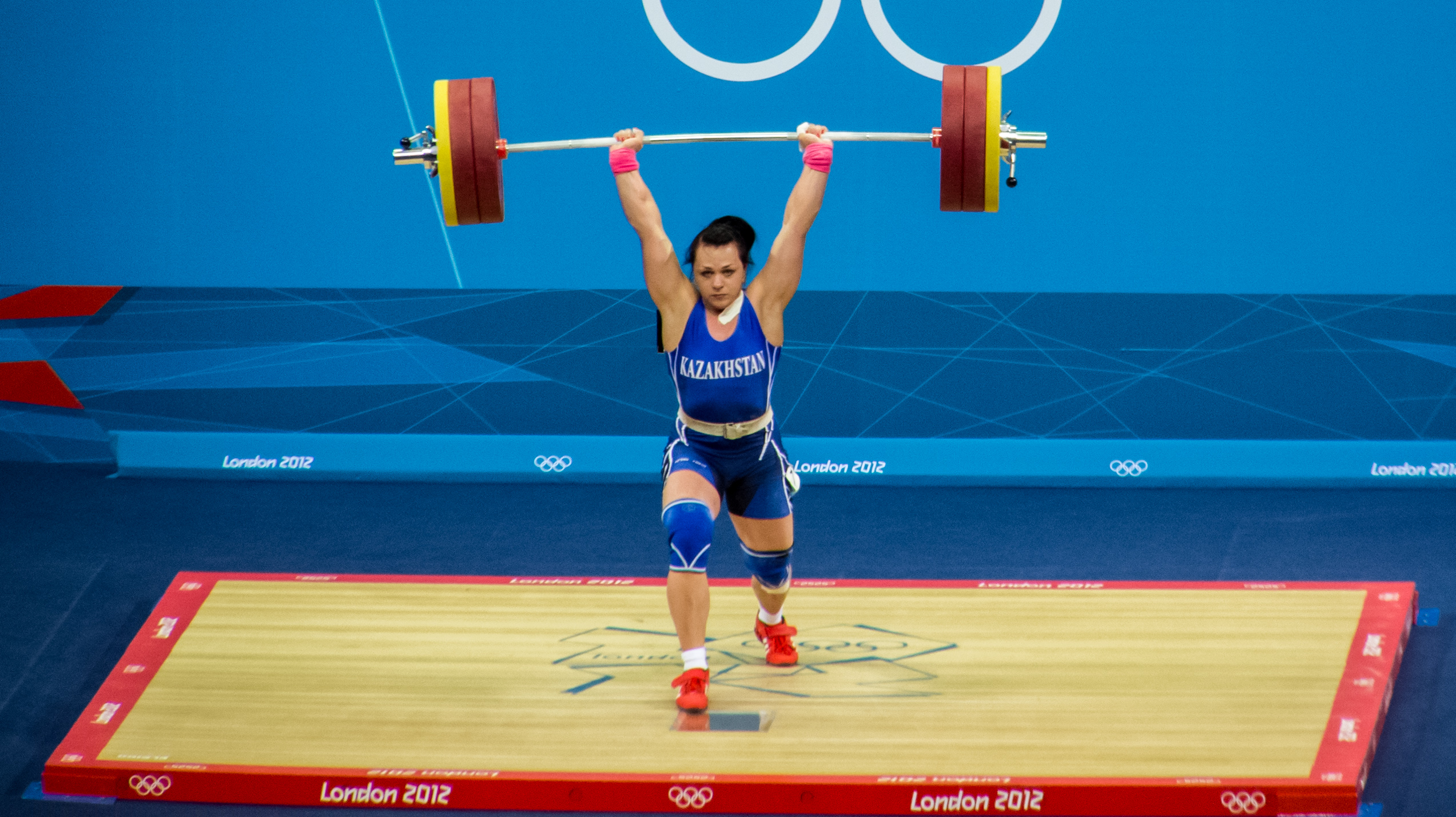
Weightlifting

- Basque traditional weightlifting
- CrossFit
- Highland games
- Kettlebell lifting
- Olympic weightlifting
- Powerlifting
- Bodybuilding
- Strength athletics (strongman)
- Steinstossen

== Mixed discipline ==
Decathlon, heptathlon, and the pentathlons consist of ten, seven, and five-component contests that are scored together using one points system.

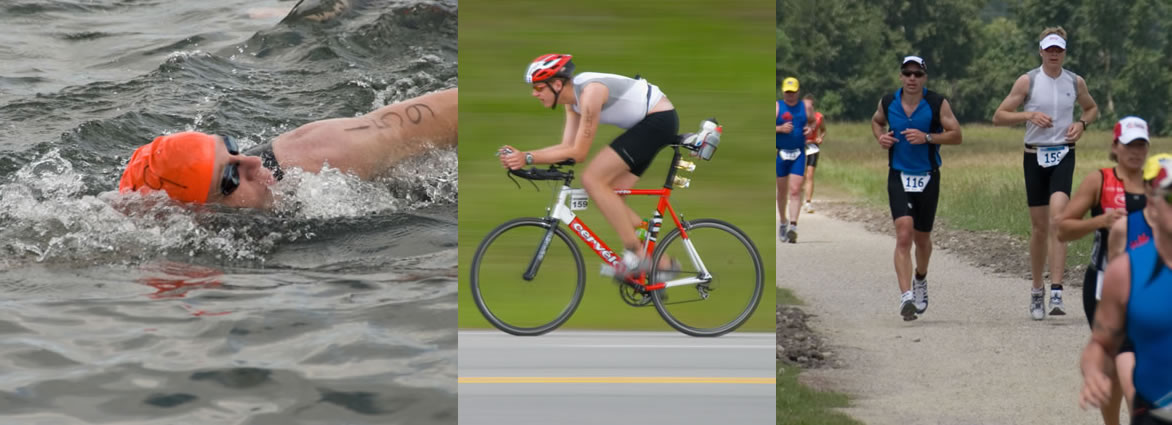
The three components of triathlon: swimming, cycling, running

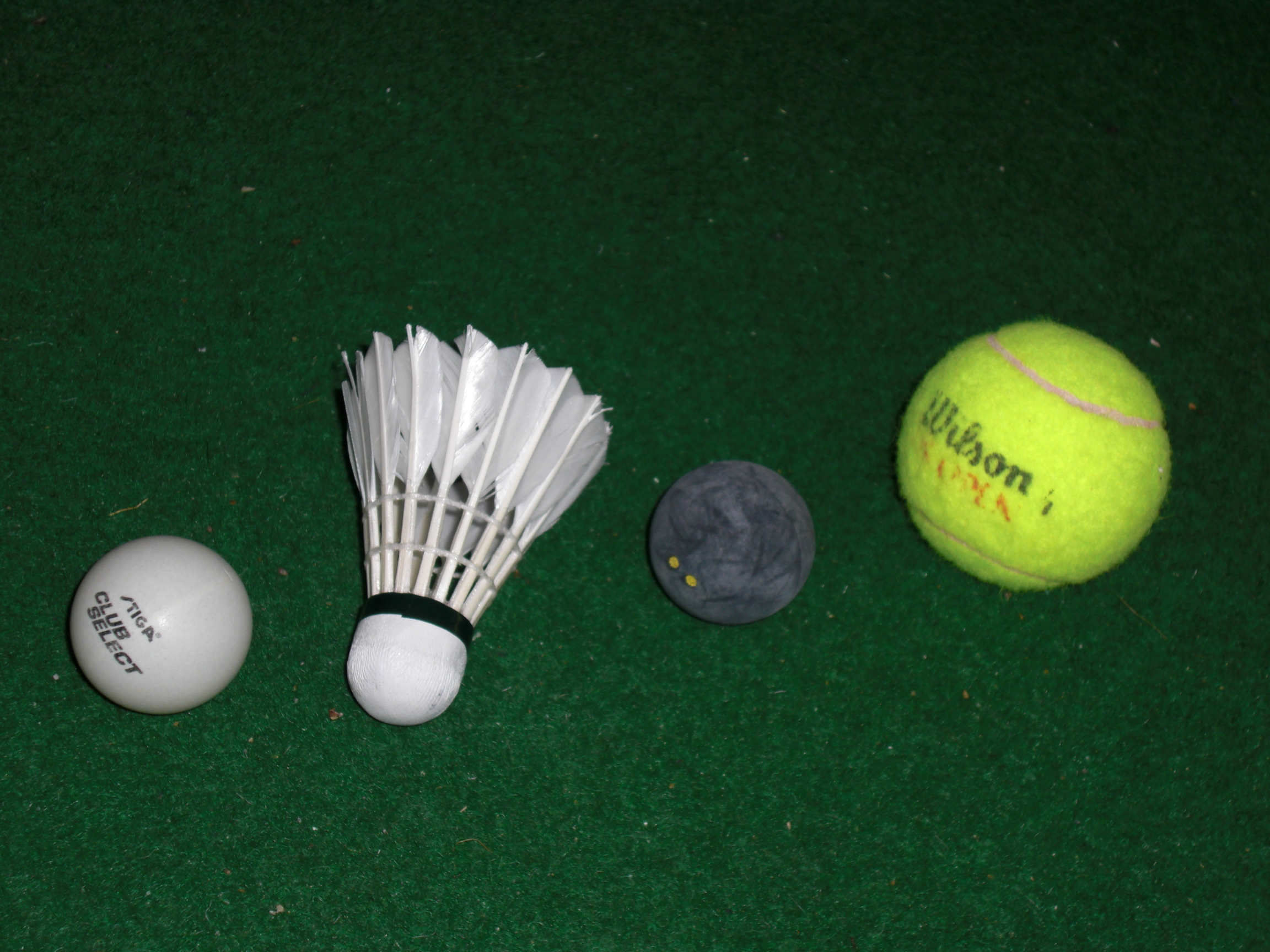
Balls of the sports that are part of Rackleton

- Adventure racing
- Racketlon
- Run archery
- Biathlon
  - Military patrol
- Coast to Coast
- Triathlon
  - Cross triathlon
  - Aquathlon
  - Aquacycling
  - Duathlon
  - Winter triathlon
  - Indoor triathlon
  - Ironman Triathlon
  - Ultra-triathlon
- Quadrathlon
- Pentathlon
  - Ancient Olympic pentathlon
  - Athletics pentathlon
    - Throws pentathlon
    - Women pentathlon
  - Classic pentathlon
  - Modern pentathlon
    - Laser-run
    - Triathle
    - Tetrathlon
  - Military pentathlon
  - Aeronautical pentathlon
  - Naval pentathlon
- Hexathlon
- Heptathlon
- Octathlon
- Decathlon
- Tetradecathlon
- Icosathlon
- Ski orienteering
- Swimrun
- Decamentathlon

== Mind sports ==
Requiring little or no physical exertion or agility, mind sports are often not considered true sports. Some mind sports are recognised by sporting federations. The following list is intended to represent anything that is likely to be referred to as a mind sport, not to argue their validity as sports.

- Decamentathlon

=== Card games ===
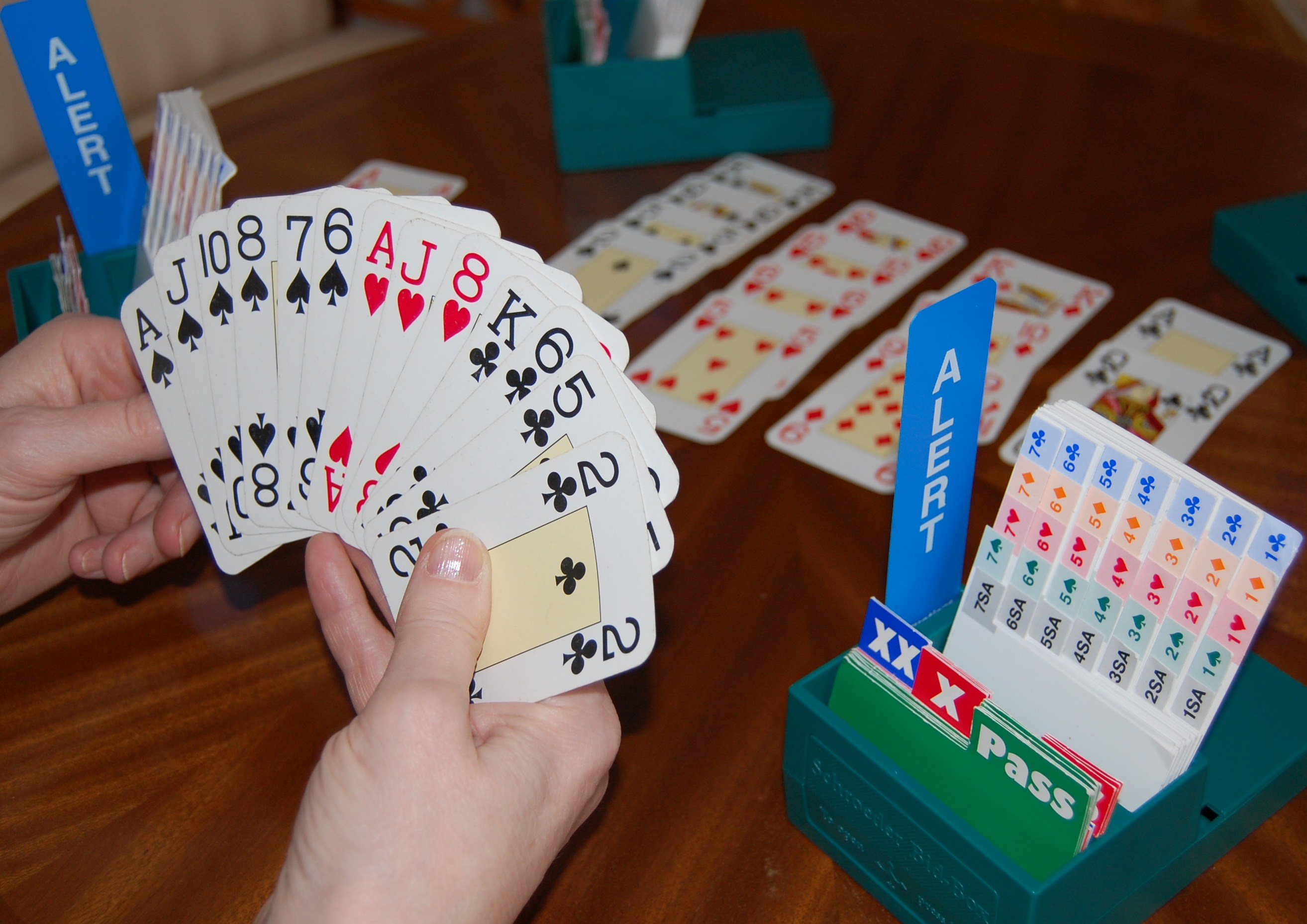
Bridge

- Contract bridge
- Hanafuda
- Patience
  - Klondike
  - Freecell
  - Pyramid
  - Spider
  - Tri peaks
- Poker
  - Classic poker
  - Omaha
  - Online poker
  - Texas hold'em
- Skat
- Truco
- Whist

=== Combination puzzle ===
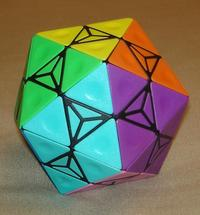
Dogic

- Speedsolving
  - Tetrahedron
    - Pyraminx
    - Pyramorphix
  - Cube
    - 2x2x2
    - 3x3x3
      - 3x3x3 One-Handed
    - 4x4x4
    - 5×5×5
    - 6×6×6
    - 7×7×7
    - Skewb
    - Square-1
  - Skewb Diamond (octahedron)
  - Dodecahedron
    - Megaminx
    - Pyraminx Crystal
    - Skewb Ultimate
  - Dogic (icosahedron)
  - Other
    - Rubik's Clock

=== Competitive model sports ===
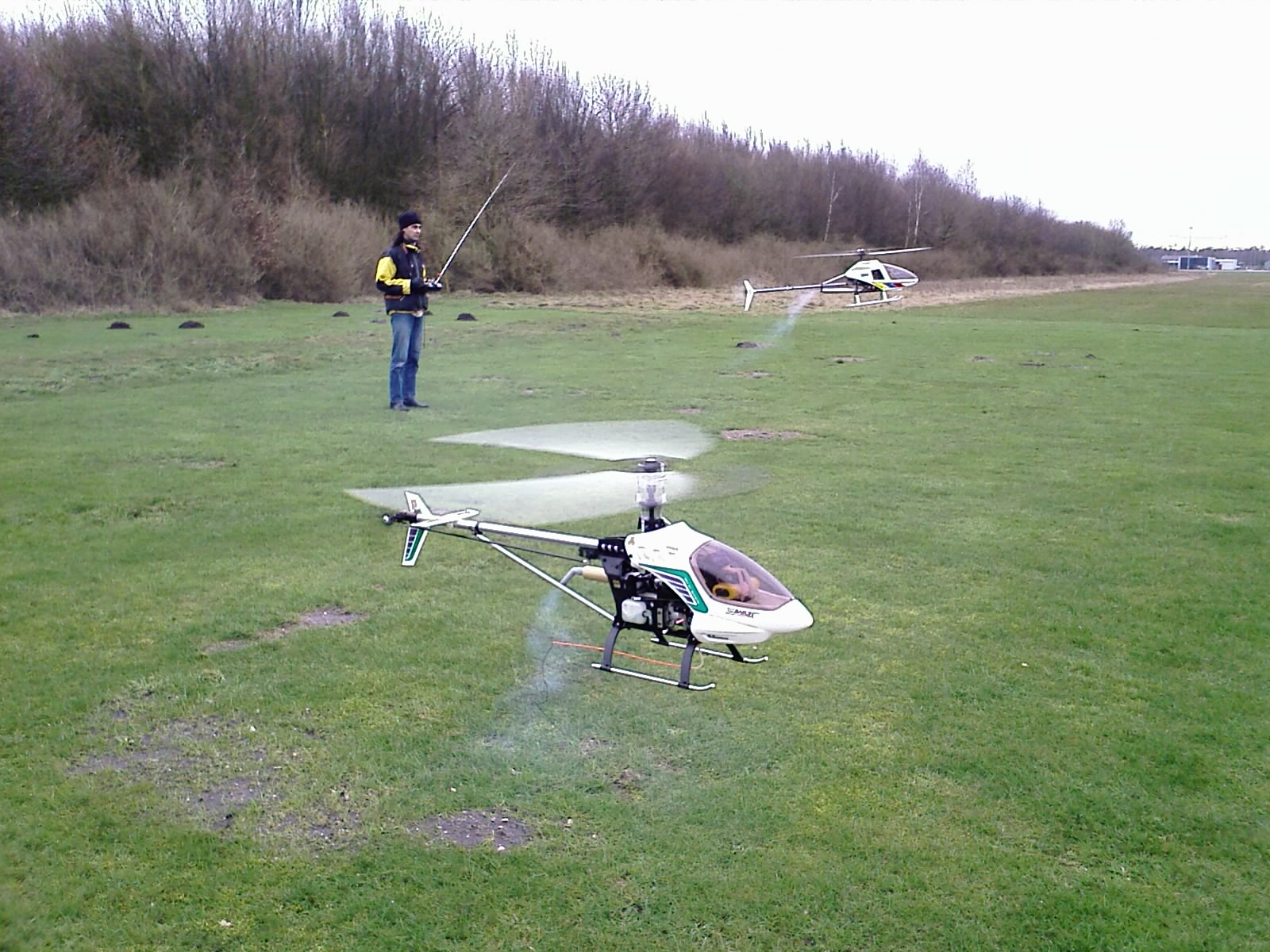
RC aircraft

- Mini 4WD
- Model aircraft racing
- Model yacht racing
- Neppis

==== Remote control ====
- Drone racing
- Model aerobatics
- RC racing
- Robot competition
  - Robot combat
    - Robot boxing
    - Robot-sumo
  - Robot football
    - Soccer robot
- Slot car racing

=== Esports ===
0 A.D. a real-time strategy game

- Arcade game
- Battle royale game
- Digital collectible card game
- Fighting game
- Multiplayer online battle arena
- Puzzle video game
  - Tile-matching video game
- Real-time tactics
- Rhythm game
- Shooter game
  - First-person shooter
  - Third-person shooter
- Speedrunning
- Strategy video game
  - Real-time strategy
- Simulation video game
  - Immersive sim
  - Job simulation game
  - Construction and management simulation
    - Business simulation game
    - City-building game
    - Government simulation game
  - Life simulation game
    - God game
    - Social simulation game
    - Dating sim
    - Farm life sim
    - Virtual pet
  - Sports video game
  - Vehicle simulation game
    - Flight simulation video game
      - Combat flight simulation game
      - Space flight simulation game
      - RC flight simulator
    - Sim racing
    - Submarine simulator
    - Train simulator
    - Vehicular combat game

=== Strategy board games ===
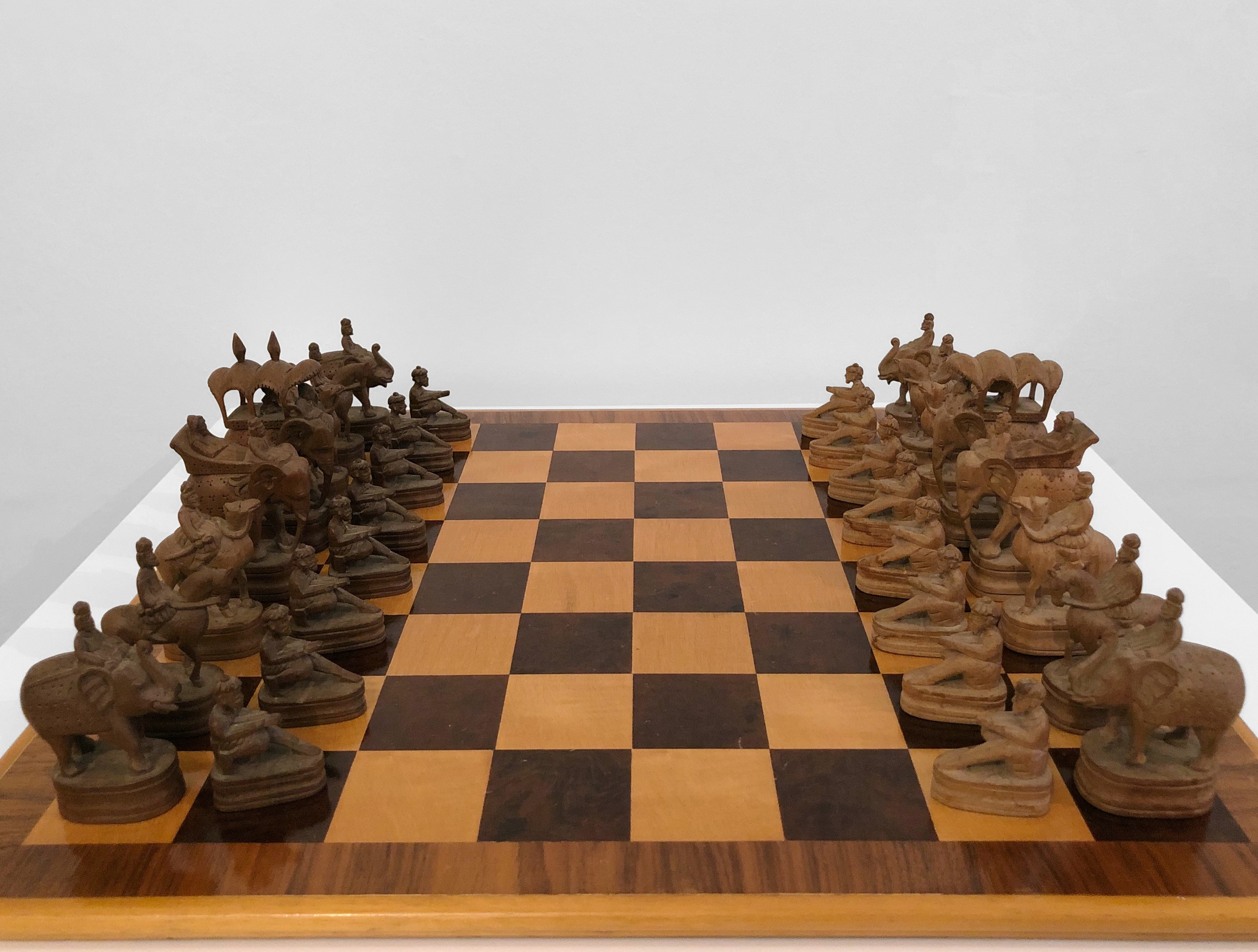
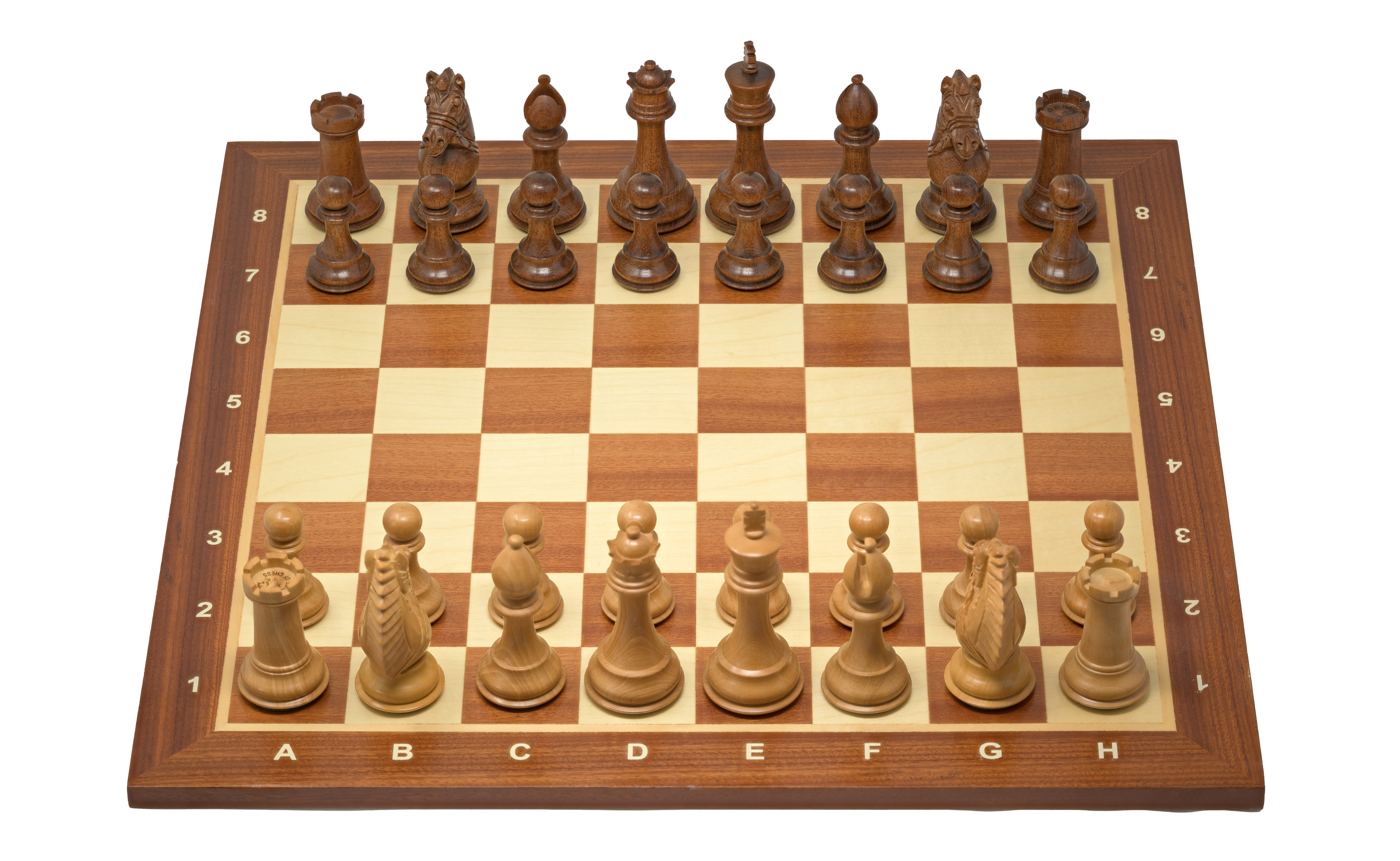
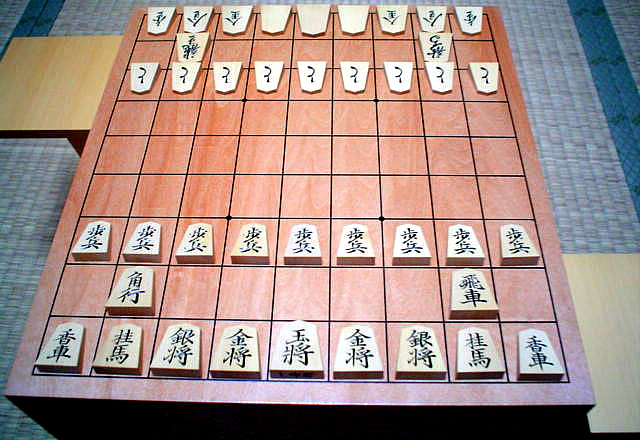
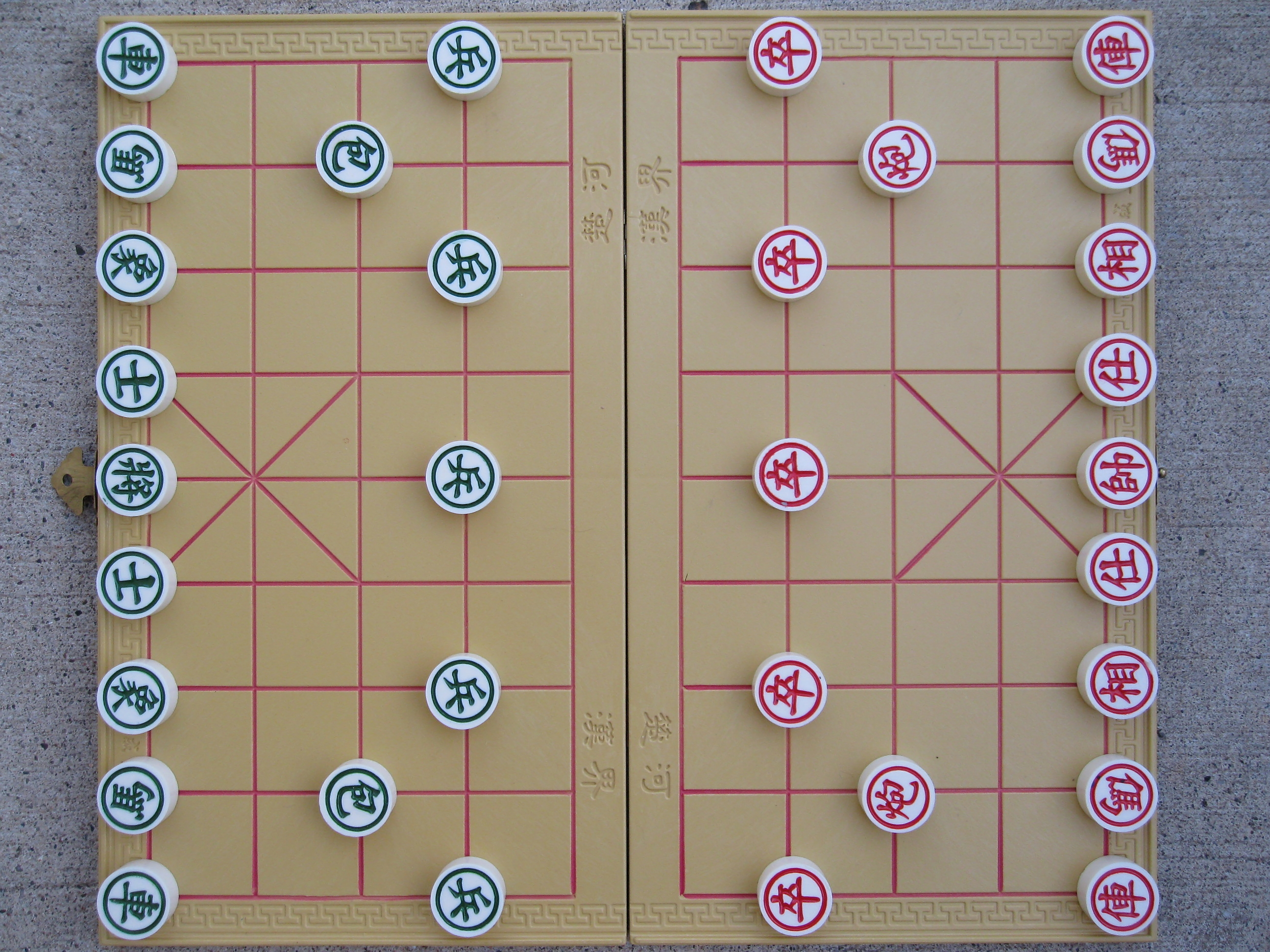
Chaturanga and its main derivatives

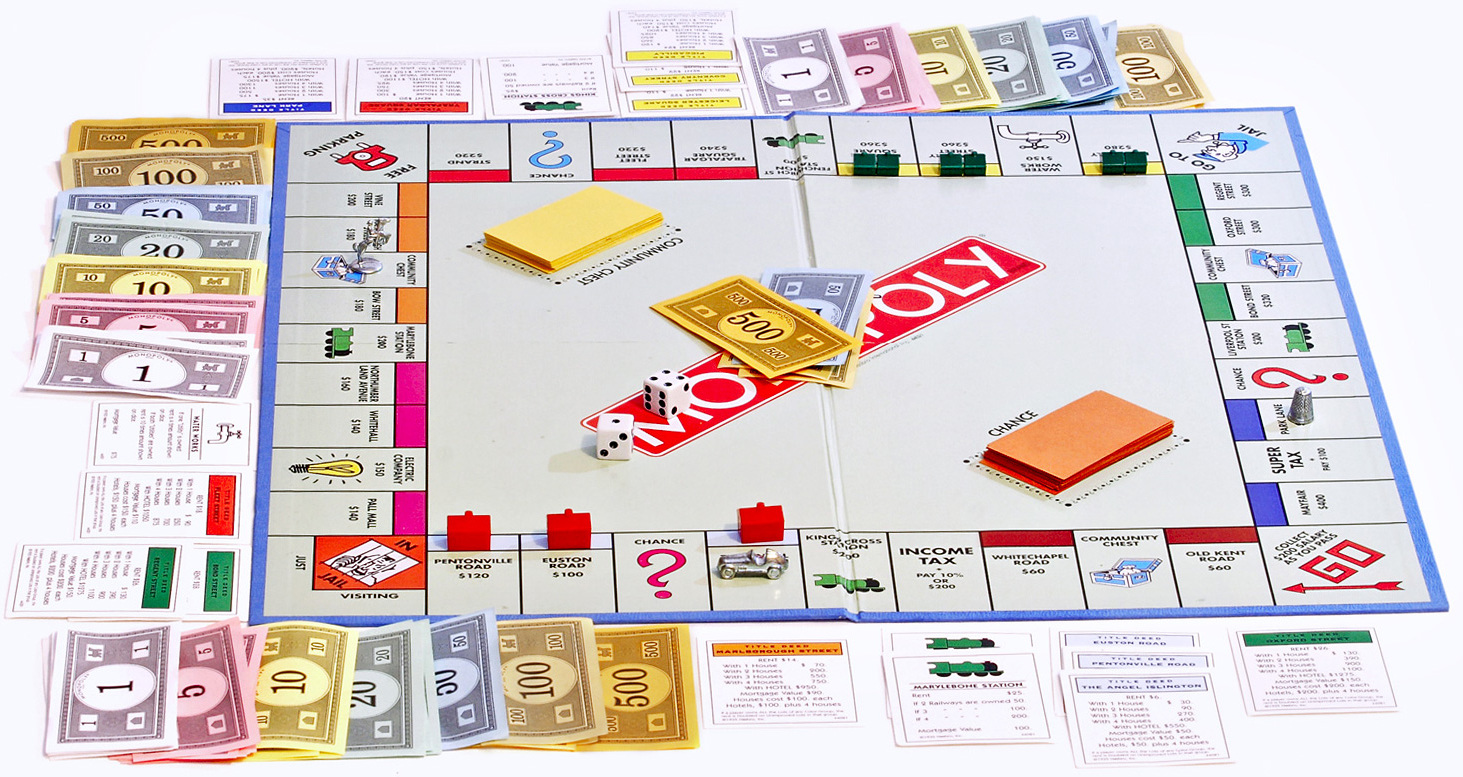
A game of Monopoly

- Chaturanga
  - Arimaa
  - Chadarangam
  - Chaturaji
  - Janggi
  - Makruk
  - Mak-yek
  - Shatar
  - Shatra (game)
  - Shatranj
    - Chess
      - Atomic chess
      - Bughouse chess
      - Chess960 (also known as Fischer Random Chess)
      - Fast chess
      - Losing chess
      - More than two players
        - Four-player chess
        - Three-player chess
      - Non square board
        - Circular chess
        - Cylinder chess
        - Hexagonal chess
        - Spherical chess
        - Three-dimensional chess
      - Cheskers
    - Courier chess
    - Grant Acedrex
    - Indian chess
    - Senterej
    - Short assize
    - Tamerlane chess
  - Shōgi
    - Chu shogi
    - Philosophy shogi checkers
    - Wa shogi
  - Sittuyin
  - Xiangqi (Chinese chess)
    - Banqi
    - Game of the Three Kingdoms
- Checkers
  - International
  - Canadian
  - English
  - Turkish
- Chinese checkers
- Diplomacy
- Dominoes
- Go
- Go-Moku
- Ludo
- Mahjong
- Mancala
- Monopoly
- Reversi
- Risk
- Scrabble
- Sholo Guti
- Sogo (Score four)
- Stratego
- Sudoku
- Tables games
  - Backgammon
  - Jacquet
- Yut

=== Fantasy sports ===
- Fantasy auto racing
- Fantasy baseball
- Fantasy basketball
- Fantasy football
  - Association football
  - Australian rules
  - Gridiron football
- Fantasy golf
- Fantasy hockey
- Fantasy wrestling

=== Other ===
- Competitive programming
- Debating
- Quizzing
- Capture the flag (cybersecurity)
- Puzzles
- Tic-tac-toe

== Both physical and mind ==
- Chess boxing
- Dance pad
- Electro-mechanical game
- Esports
- Fitness game
- Phygital sport
- Screen sports
- Virtual reality game
  - Virtual Taekwondo

== Different classification ==
Potentially other sports are listed here.

=== Air sports ===
- Air racing
- Banzai skydiving
- Bungee jumping
- Hot air ballooning
- Indoor skydiving

=== Beach sports ===
Versions of sports played on sand

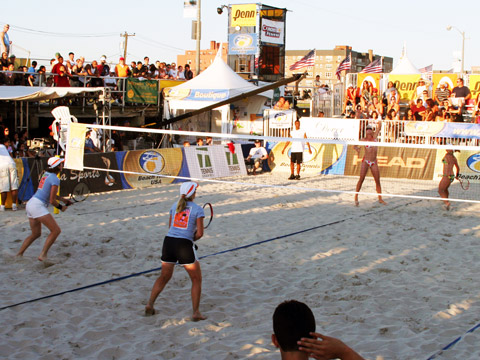
Beach tennis

- Beach basketball
- Beach golf
- Beach handball
- Beach hockey
- Beach karate
- Beach rugby
- Beach soccer
- Beach tennis
- Beach volleyball
  - Beach volleyball 4x4
- Beach wrestling

=== Compromise rules ===
- Composite rules shinty–hurling
  - Iomain
- International game
- International rules football
- One-wall handball

=== Electronic sports ===
Sports played using electronic devices.

- Boxer Punch machine
- Capture the flag (cybersecurity)
- Combat robot
- Competitive programming
- Contesting
- Electronic dartboard
- Fitness game
- Pinball
- Radio-control vehicles
- Video gaming
- Wire loop game

=== Endurance sports ===
- Chariot racing
- Cross-country skiing
- Cycling
- Iditarod
- Long-distance running
- Rowing
- Swimming
- Touch the Truck
- Wheelchair racing
- Woodchopping

=== Ice sports ===
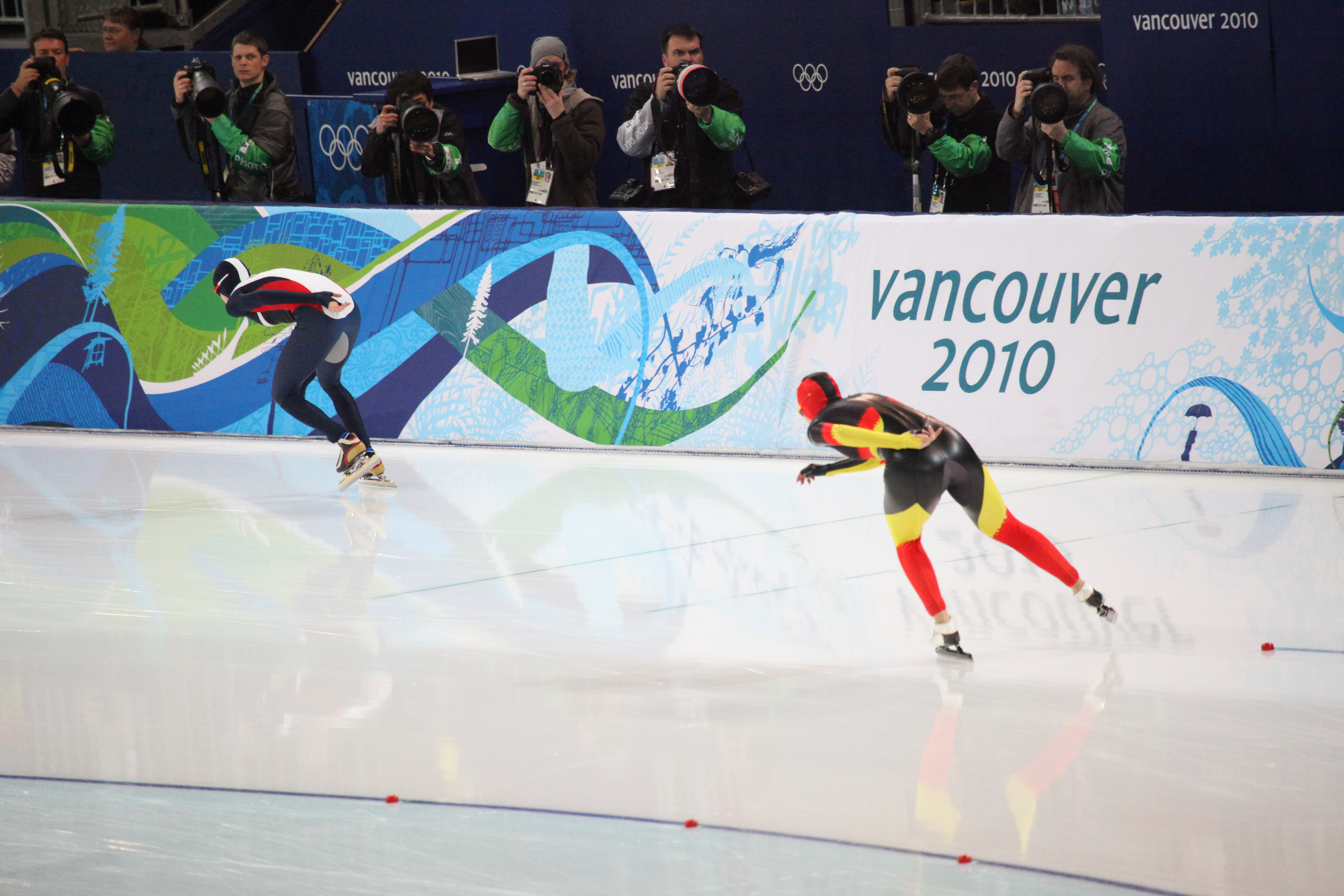
Speed skating

- Figure skating
  - Four skating
  - Ice dancing
  - Ice theatre
  - Pair skating
  - Single skating
  - Synchronized skating
- Hockey
  - Bandy
    - Rink bandy
  - Broomball
    - Moscow broomball
  - Ice hockey
    - Sledge hockey
    - Spongee
  - Ringette
- Ice cricket
- Ice fishing
- Ice football
- Icetrack cycling
- Ice yachting
- Sled
  - Bobsleigh
  - Luge
  - Skeleton
- Speed skating
  - Barrel jumping
  - Ice cross downhill
  - Long-track speed skating
  - Short-track speed skating
- Target
  - Crokicurl
  - Curling
  - Ice stock sport

=== Marker sports ===
- Airsoft
- Archery
- Paintball
- Darts

=== Parasports ===
==== Visual impaired ====
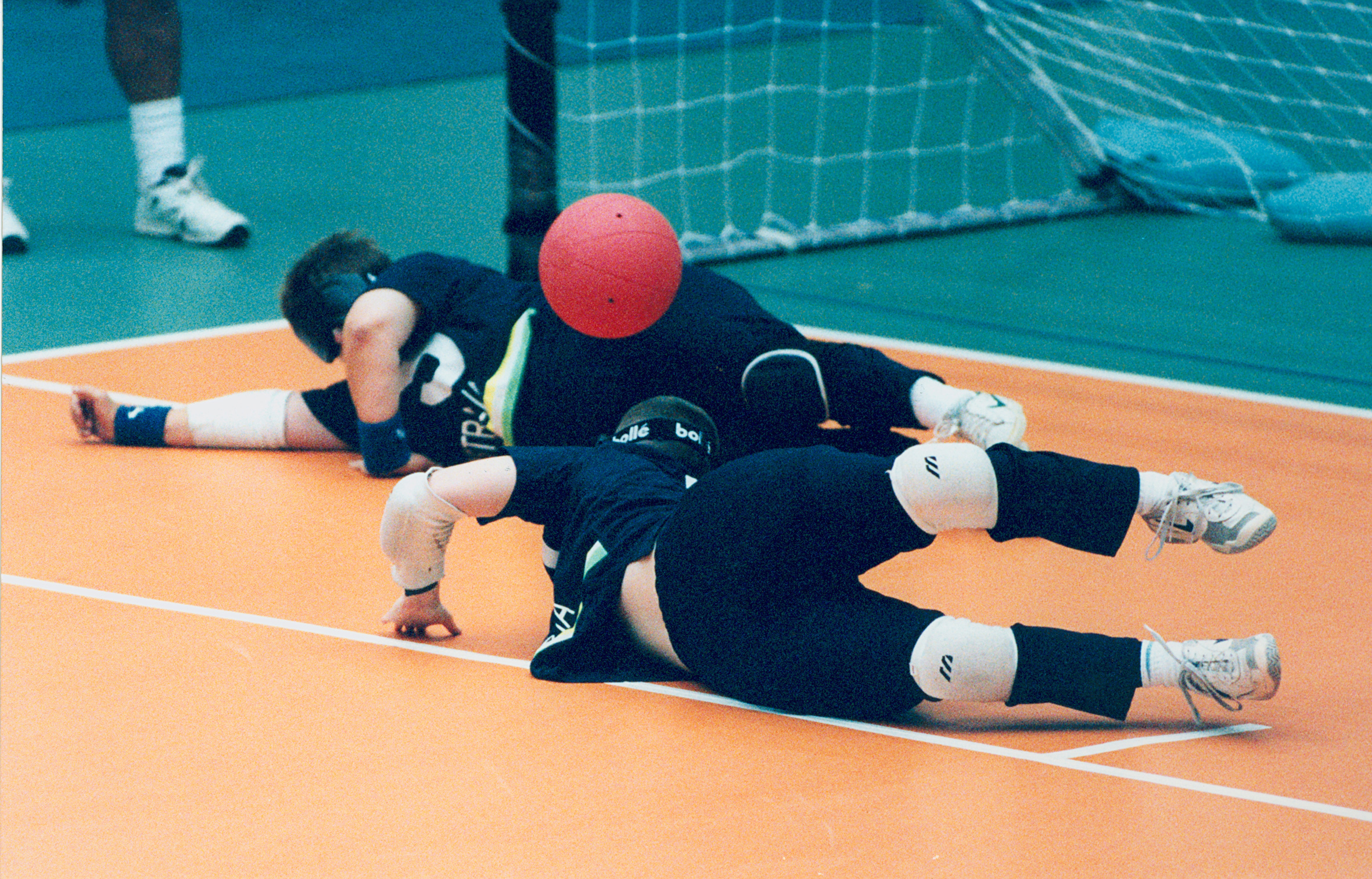
Goalball

- Audio Darts
- Blind baseball
  - Beep baseball
- Blind cricket
- Blind football
- Blind inline hockey
- Goalball
- Torball
- Para judo
- Showdown

==== Wheelchair sports ====
Para-versions of sports played using wheelchairs

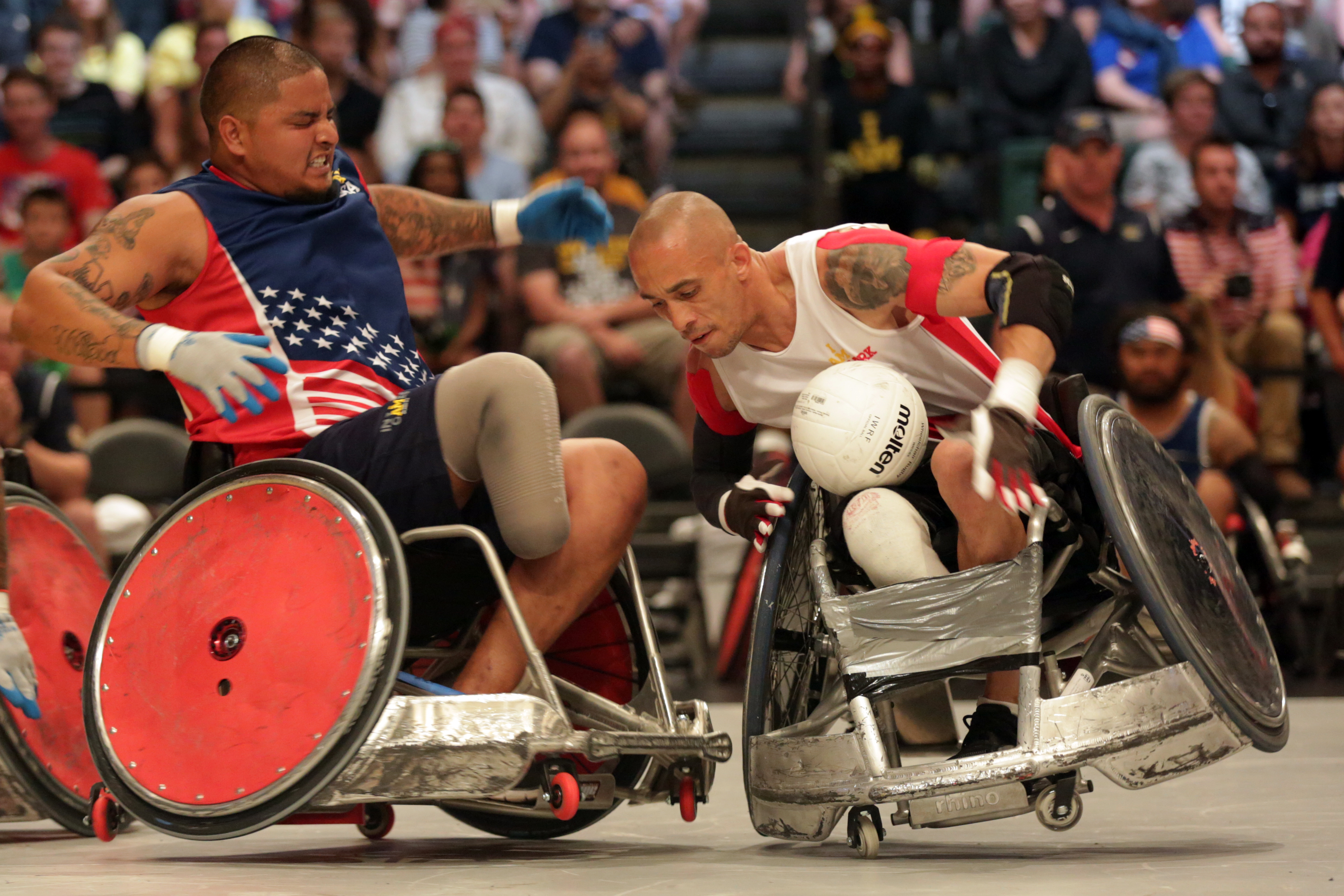
Wheelchair rugby

- Power hockey
- Wheelchair American Football
- Wheelchair Australian rules football
- Wheelchair basketball
- Wheelchair curling
- Wheelchair dancesport
- Wheelchair fencing
- Wheelchair handball
- Wheelchair lacrosse
- Wheelchair netball
- Wheelchair pickleball
- Wheelchair racing
- Wheelchair rugby
- Wheelchair rugby league
- Wheelchair soccer
  - Powerchair football
- Wheelchair tennis

==== Other ====
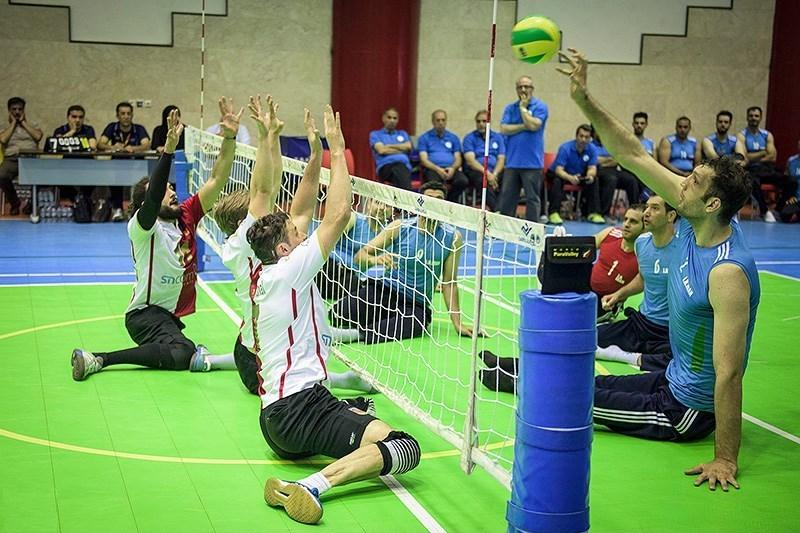
Sitting volleyball

- Adaptive Standing Tennis
- Boccia
- Deaf basketball
- Deaf cricket
- One-armed versus one-legged cricket
- Table Cricket
- Ice sledge racing
- Inline sledge hockey
- Sledge hockey
- Special hockey
- Midget wrestling
- Para-alpine skiing
- Para-athletics
  - Frame running
  - Club throw
  - Softball throw
- Para-badminton
- Paracanoe
- Paraclimbing
- Para-cycling
  - Handcycle
- Para-equestrian
- Para-gymnastics
- Paralympic football
  - Amputee football
  - CP football
- Paralympic Nordic skiing
  - Para biathlon
  - Paralympic cross-country skiing
- Paralympic powerlifting
- Paralympic shooting
- Pararowing
- Para snowboard
- Para-strongman
- Para surfing
- Para swimming
- Para table tennis
- Para taekwondo
- Paratriathlon
- Sitting volleyball
- Standing volleyball
  - Beach ParaVolley

=== Snow sports ===
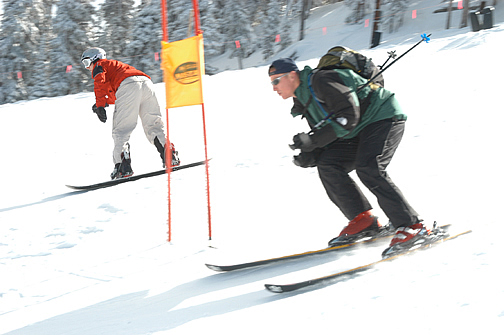
A snowboarder and a skier

- Boardercross
- Freestyle snowboarding
- Ski flying
- Skibob
- Snow baseball
- Snowboarding
- Snowshoe running
- Snow golf
- Snow volleyball
- Skiboarding
- Yukigassen

=== Street sports ===
- Free running and jumping
- Freestyle footbag
- Freestyle football
- Powerbocking
- Parkour
- Scootering
- Street hockey
- Street soccer
- Street american football
- Street workout

=== Strength sports ===
Sports mainly based on sheer power.

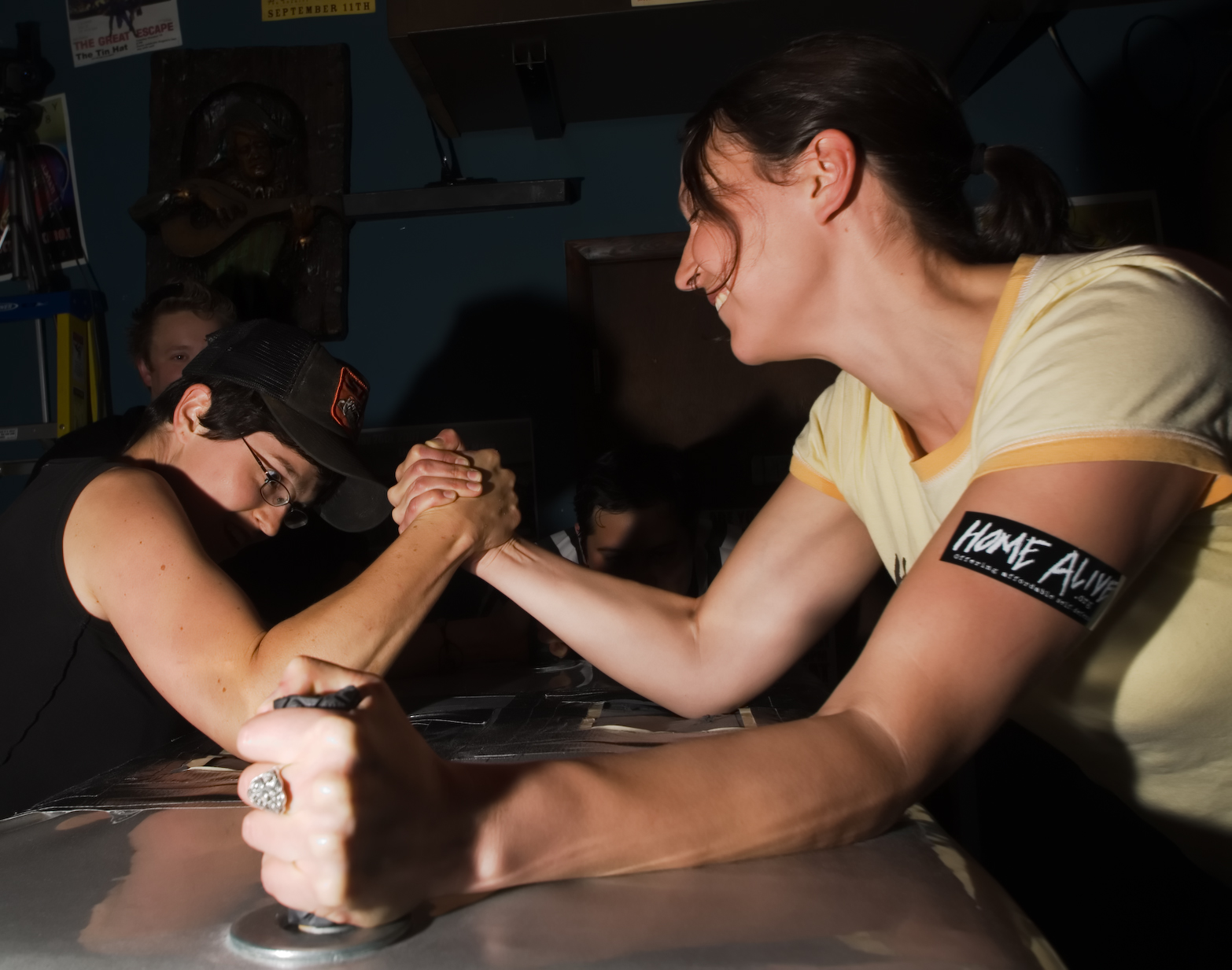
Arm wrestling

- Arm wrestling
- Leg wrestling
- CrossFit
- High striker
- Highland games
  - Caber toss
  - Sheaf toss
  - Stone put
  - Weight throw
- Olympic weightlifting
- Powerlifting
- Rock climbing
- Strongman
- Thumb wrestling
- Toe wrestling
- Leg wrestling
- Tug of war
- Woodchopping
- Wood splitting
- Zourkhaneh
- Calisthenics

=== Tabletop games ===
- Backgammon
- Beer pong
- Carrom
- Carrom Nok Hockey
- Chaturanga and descendants
- Connect Four
- Crokinole
- Draughts (a.k.a. checkers)
- Dominoes
- Mahjong
- Paper football
- Reversi (a.k.a. Othello)
- Scrabble
- Yahtzee

==== Tabletop sports ====
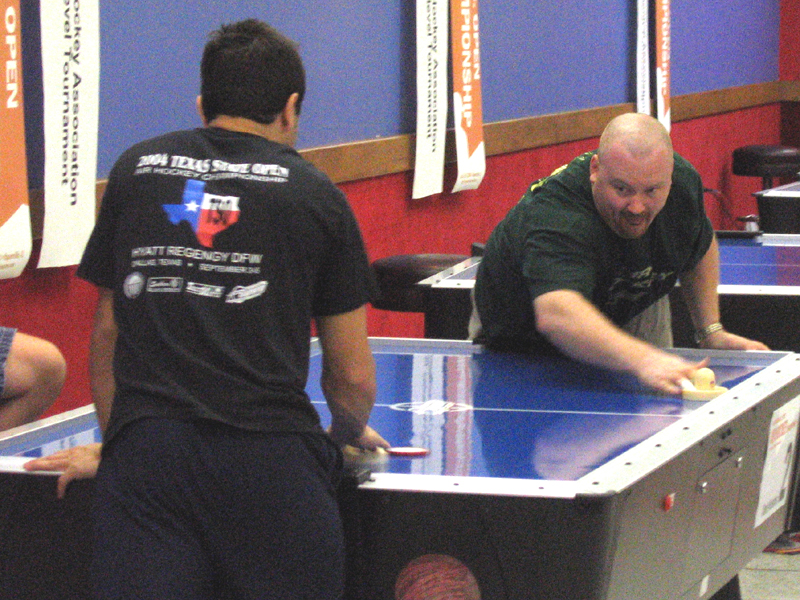
Air hockey

- Air hockey
- Cue sports
- Headis
- Pinball
- Tabletop baseball
- Table Cricket
- Table hockey
- Table Shuffleboard/Sling Puck
- Table tennis (a.k.a. ping pong)
- Tabletop football
  - Blow football
  - Button football
  - Sports table football
  - Subbuteo
  - Table football
- Teqball
- Teqvoly
- Tipong

=== Target sports ===
Sports where the main objective is to hit a certain target.

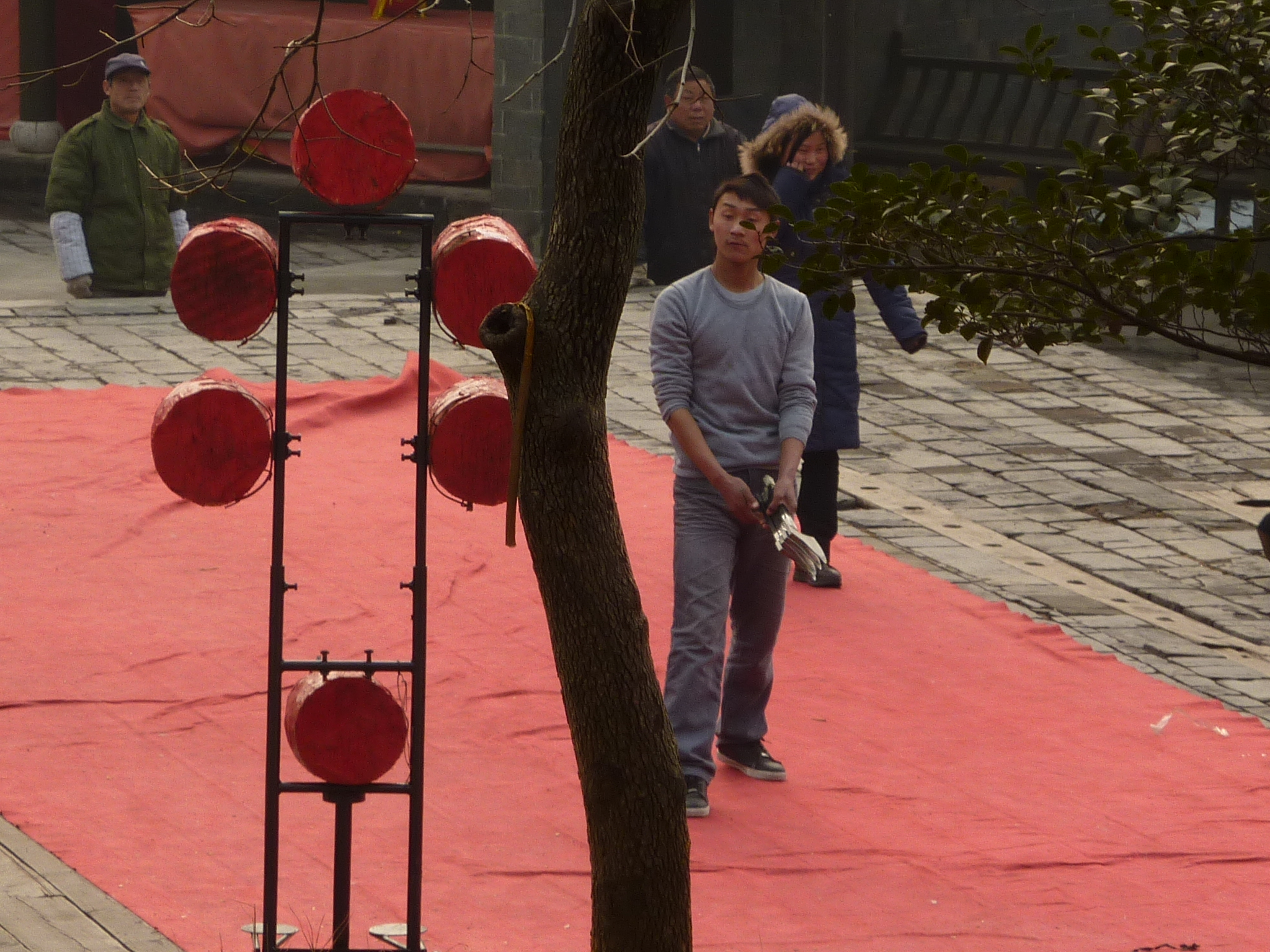
Axe throwing at the Ming Culture Village, a theme park near the Yangshan Quarry, China

- Angleball
- Archery
- Axe throwing
- Boules
- Bowling
- Calva
- Cornhole
- Croquet
- Cue sports
- Curling
- Darts
- Dartball
- Golf
- Horseshoes (horseshoe throwing)
- Jukskei
- KanJam
- Knife throwing
- Kubb
- Lawn darts
- Matball
- Mölkky
- Pall mall
- Peashooter (toy)
- Pitch and putt
- Ring-goal
- Ring toss
- Shooting
- Shuffleboard
- Skittles
- Skee ball
- Snowball fight
- Tejo
- Trugo
- Varpa
- Water balloon

=== Team sports ===
Sports that involve teams.

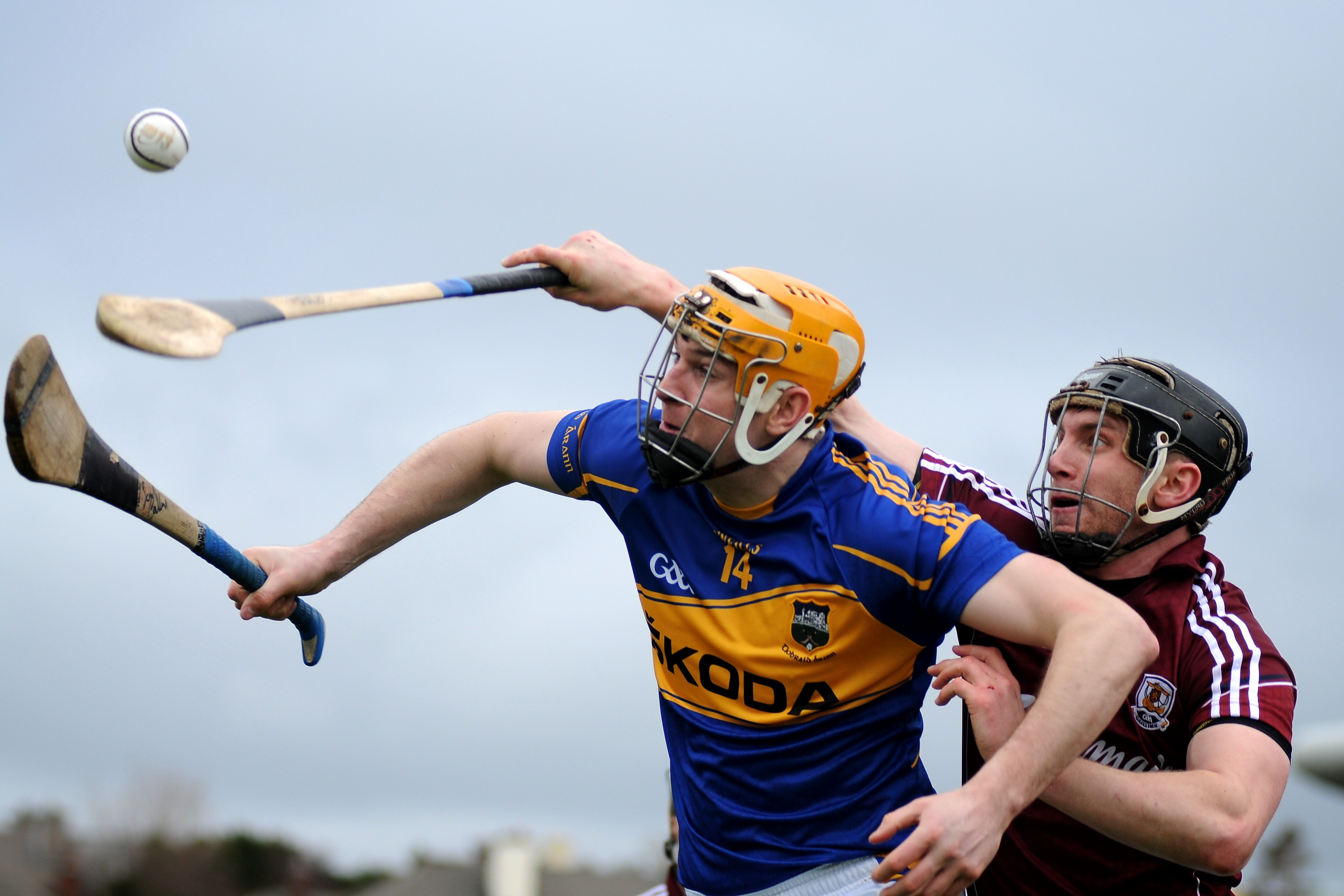
Hurling

- Angleball
- Baseball
- Basketball
- Basque pelota
- Bat and ball games
- Bowling
- Bunnock
- Camogie
- Dodgeball
- Football
- Gateball
- Handball
- Hardcourt Bike Polo
- Hockey
- Horseshoe
- Hurling
- Kickball
- Kin-Ball
- Lacrosse
- Loofball
- Mesoamerican ballgame
- Motoball
- Newcomb ball
- Paintball
- Polo
- Quidditch
- Ringette
- Roller derby
- Rowing
- Sepak takraw
- Tchoukball
- Ultimate
- Volleyball
- Whirlyball
- Woodsman
- Yukigassen

=== Vehicle sports ===
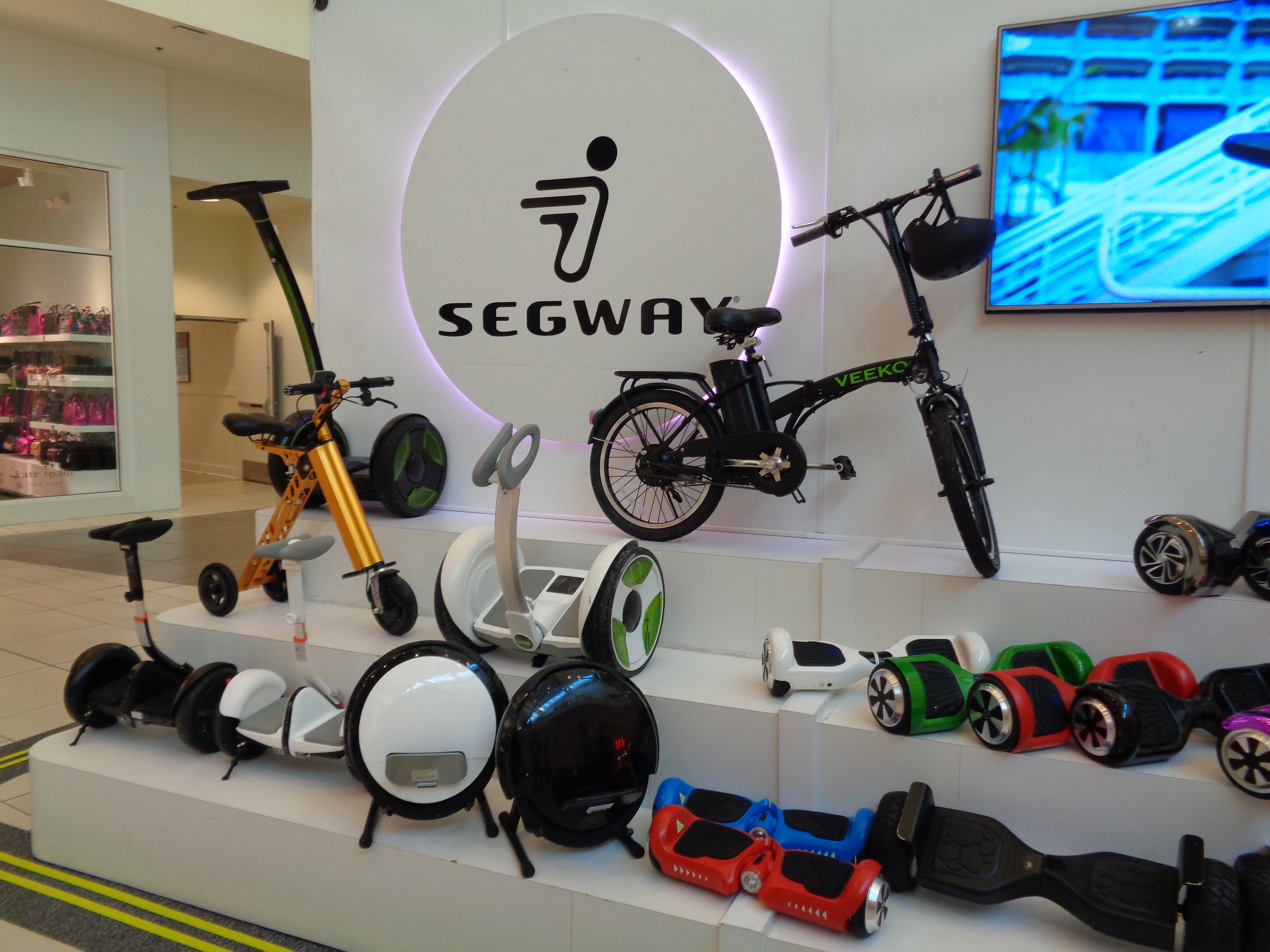
Different types of terrestrial vehicles

- Human powered
  - Cycle sport
  - Rowing
  - Kayaking
  - Roller sports
- Motorized
  - Auto racing
  - Motorcycle sport
  - Air racing
  - Aerobatics
- Other
  - Sailing
  - Gravity racer
  - Sledding

=== Windsports ===
Sports which use the wind (apart from sailing):

- Kite flying
- Parachuting
- Hot air balloon racing
- Indoor skydiving

=== By retribution ===
- Professional sports
  - Professional baseball
  - Professional gridiron football
  - Professional ice hockey
- Amateur sports
  - Amateur boxing
  - Amateur wrestling
    - Scholastic wrestling
  - Gaelic games
  - High school American football
  - High school fencing
  - University and college sport
    - College baseball
    - College basketball
    - College american football
      - College flag football
    - College ice hockey
    - College lacrosse
    - College soccer
    - Collegiate wrestling
    - Student rugby union
    - Varsity Netball

=== Fictional sports ===
Fictional sports that are played in real life:

- 43-Man Squamish
- Calvinball
- Quidditch (Harry Potter)
- Swiss Guyball
- BASEketball
- Brockian Ultra-Cricket
- Hunger Games
- Whack-bat
- Blitzball
- Fictional Martial Arts

== Miscellaneous sports ==
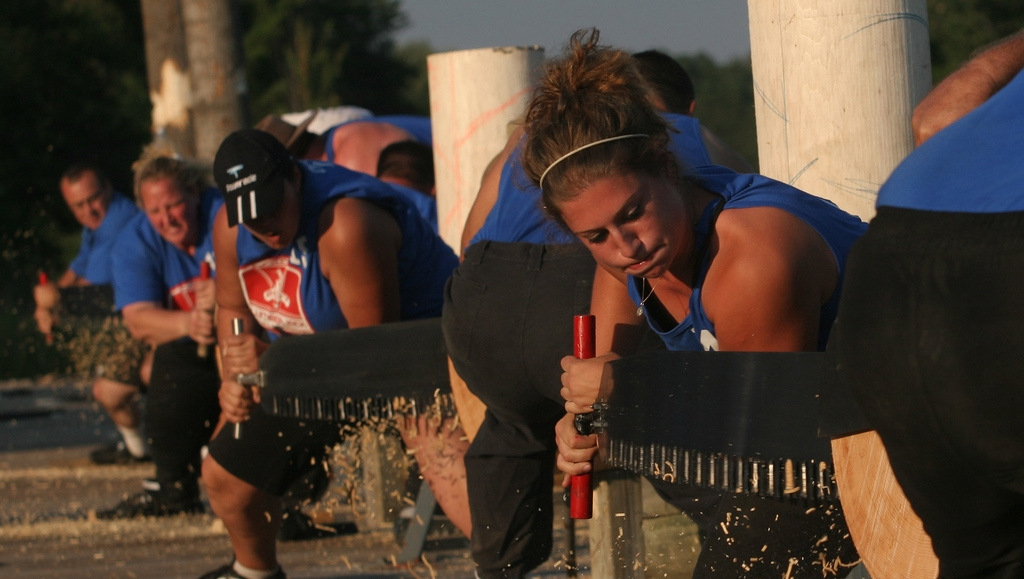
Jack and Jill competition, Lumberjack World Championships, Hayward, Wisconsin, 2007.

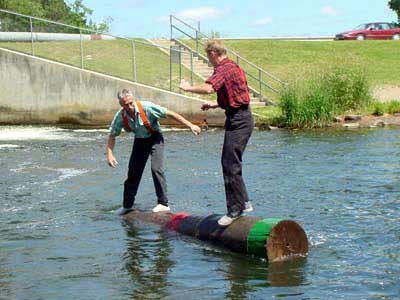
Logrolling

- Air guitar
- Arctic sports
- Battle rap
- Chess boxing
- Chicken fight
- Competitive eating
- Competitive math
- Conker fighting
- Cook-off
- Cooper's Hill Cheese-Rolling and Wake
- Cross-country BigBall
- Drum and bugle corps
- Dwile flonking
- Earthball
- Egg and spoon race
- Extreme ironing
- Extreme Pogo
- Ferret legging
- Fierljeppen
- Fingerboarding
- Footbag (hacky sack)
- Flair bartending
- Gravity Racing
- Guyball
- Gurning
- Haggis hurling
- Hopscotch
- Idiotarod
- Jegichagi
- Jeopardy!
- Jump rope
  - Double Dutch
  - Chinese jump rope
- Lawn mower racing
- Lumberjack sports
  - Aizkolaritza
  - Axe throwing
  - Logrolling
  - Wood chopping
  - Wood splitting
- Marching
- Marching band
- Military exercise
- Milk chugging
- Object spinning
- Orange Sport
  - Padiddling
  - Plate spinning
  - Top
- Patball
- Pea shooting
- Quiz Bowl
- Redneck Games
- Ring-goal
- Ringette
- Road bowling
- Sack race
- Soap shoes
- Stihl Timbersports Series
- Tennikoit
- Tetherball
- Three-legged race
- Ultimate Tazer Ball
- Wallball
- Wheel of Fortune
- Wife-carrying
- Woodsman
- Yoyoing

== See also ==
- Outline of sports
- Hybrid sport
- Individual sport
- Lists of sports video games
- List of game genres
- Team sport
