= List of racket sports =

Sports that use rackets or paddles

Racket sports (or racquet sports) are games in which players use a racket or paddle to hit a ball or a shuttlecock. A racket has a handled frame with an open hoop that supports a network of tightly stretched strings. A paddle, sometimes called a bat, has a solid face rather than a network of strings, but may be perforated with a pattern of holes, or be covered with a textured surface.

== Strung racket sports ==
- Air badminton
- Badminton
- Ball badminton
- Battledore and shuttlecock
- Crossminton (previously "Speedminton")
- Frontenis
- Longue paume
- Qianball
- Rackets
- Racquetball
- Rapidball
- Real tennis
- Soft tennis
- Speed-ball
- Squash
  - Hardball squash
  - Squash tennis
  - Squash 57
- Stické
- Tennis
- Touchtennis
- Tennis polo
- Typti
- Xare
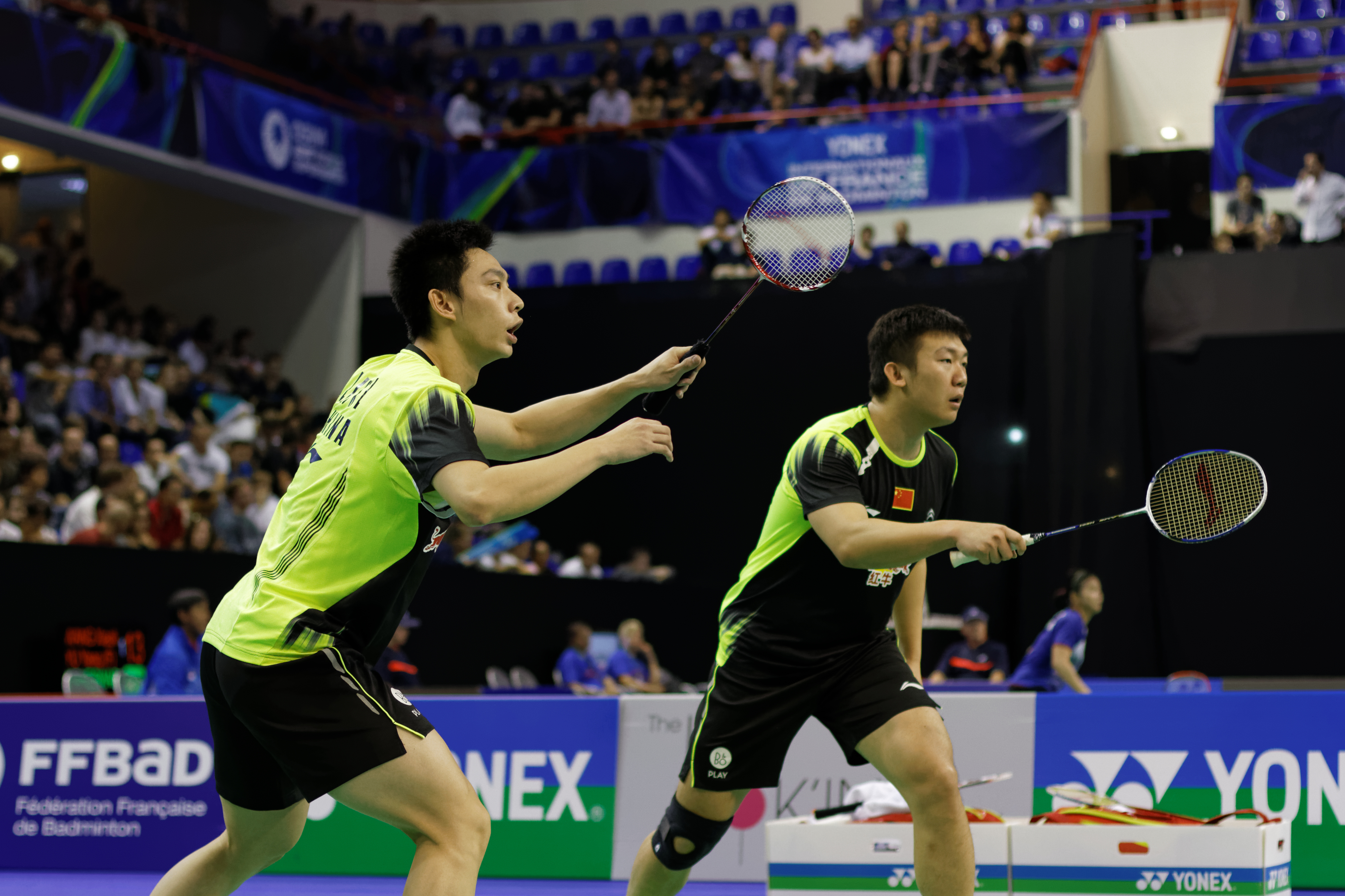
Liu Xiaolong and Qiu Zihan playing badminton at the 2013 French Open.

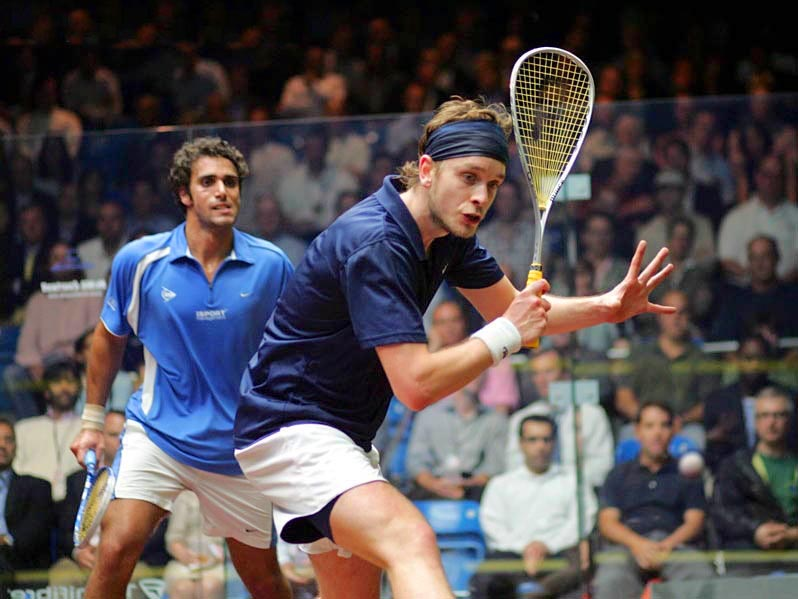
James Willstrop and Karim Darwish playing squash.

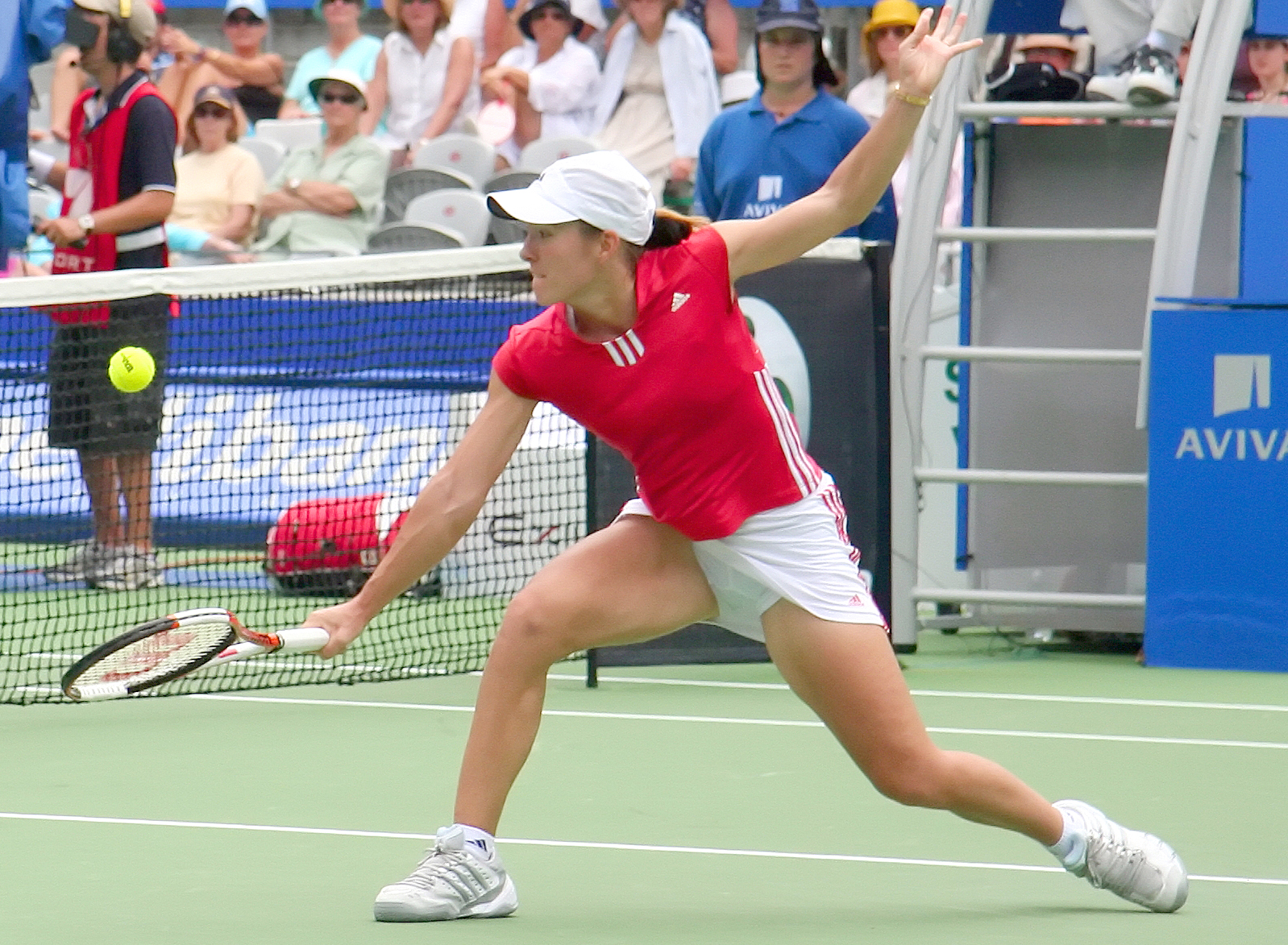
Justine Henin playing tennis at the 2006 Medibank International.

== Solid-paddle sports ==
- Basque pelota
- Beach tennis
- Chaza
- Creole tennis
- Downside ball game
- Four wall paddleball
- Frescobol
- Frescotennis
- Hanetsuki
- Jokari
- Jombola
- Matkot
- Miniten
- One wall paddleball
- Paddle ball
- Paddle tennis
- Padel
- Paleta Frontón
- Pang Pong
- Pelota mixteca
- Pickleball
- Platform tennis
- Queensball
- Road tennis
- Roliball
- Spectennis
- Sphairee
- Stoolball
- Table squash
- Table tennis (Ping Pong)
  - Hardbat
- Tamburello
- Tambourelli
- Totem tennis
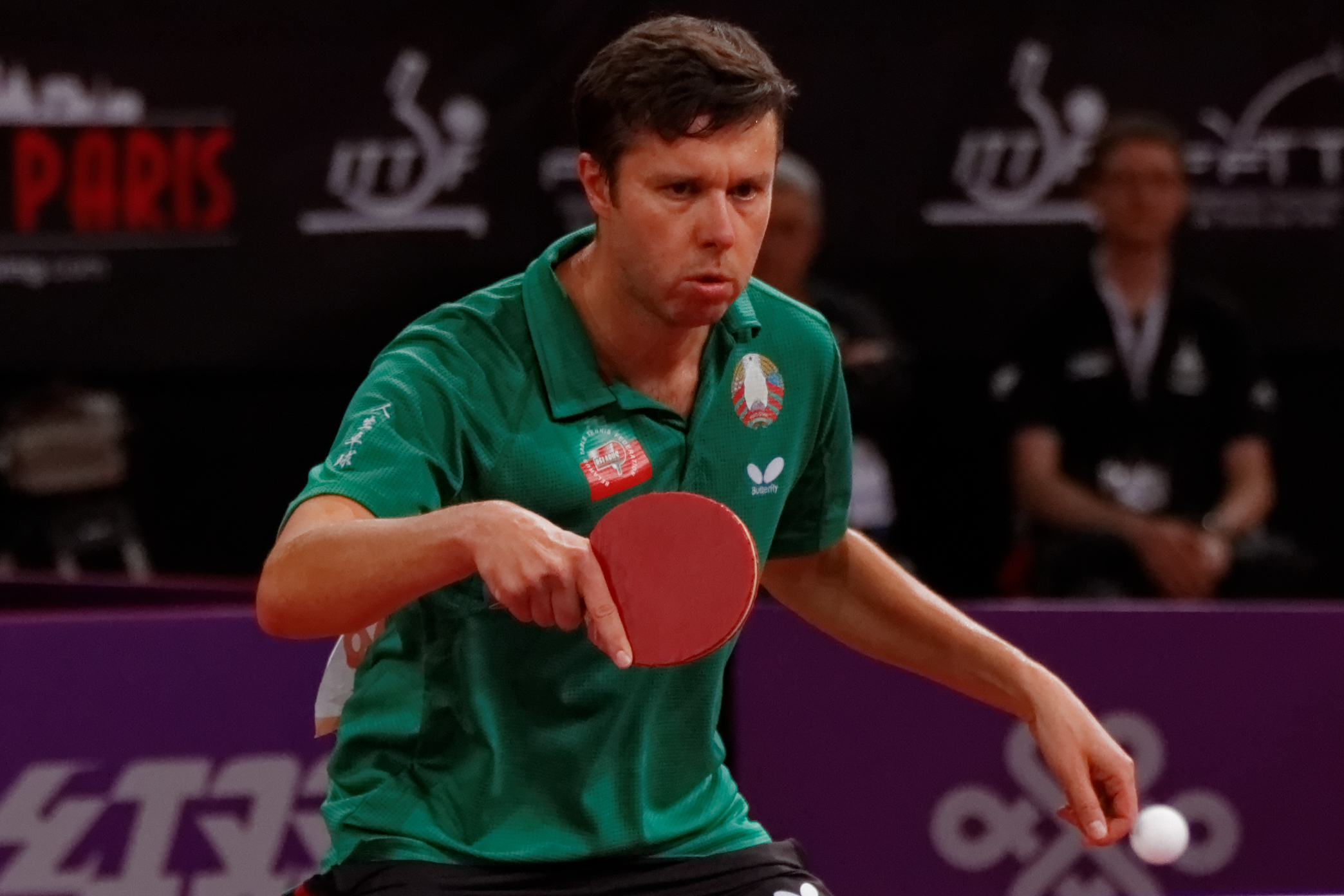
Uładzimir Samsonaŭ, a table tennis player

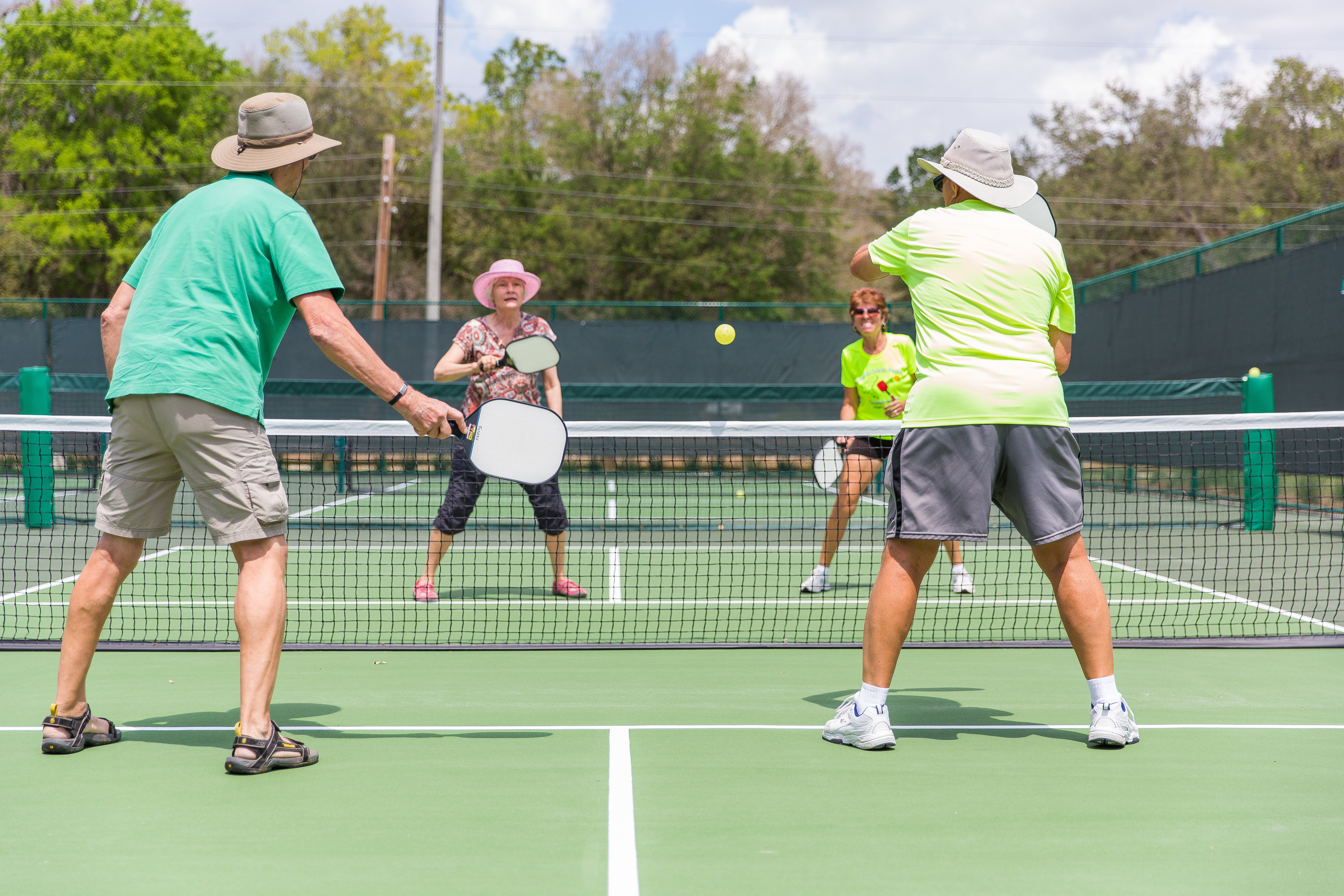
Recreational pickleball players.

== See also ==
- Bat-and-ball games
- Jai alai
- List of stick sports
- Net and wall games
- Pallone
- Racketlon
