= Paddleball (disambiguation) =

Paddle ball is a one-person toy played with an attached ball and paddle.

Paddle ball or Paddleball may also refer to:

- Paddle ball (sport), a sport involving a paddle and a ball
- One wall paddleball
- Four wall paddleball
- Padel, or paddle, a racket sport of Mexican origin
- Beach tennis, played in sand with wooden paddles
- Frescobol, a popular Brazilian beach game
- Matkot, or beach paddleball, played in Israel
- Racquetball, originally called "paddle rackets"

== See also ==
- List of racket sports
