= Jokari =

Paddle ball game

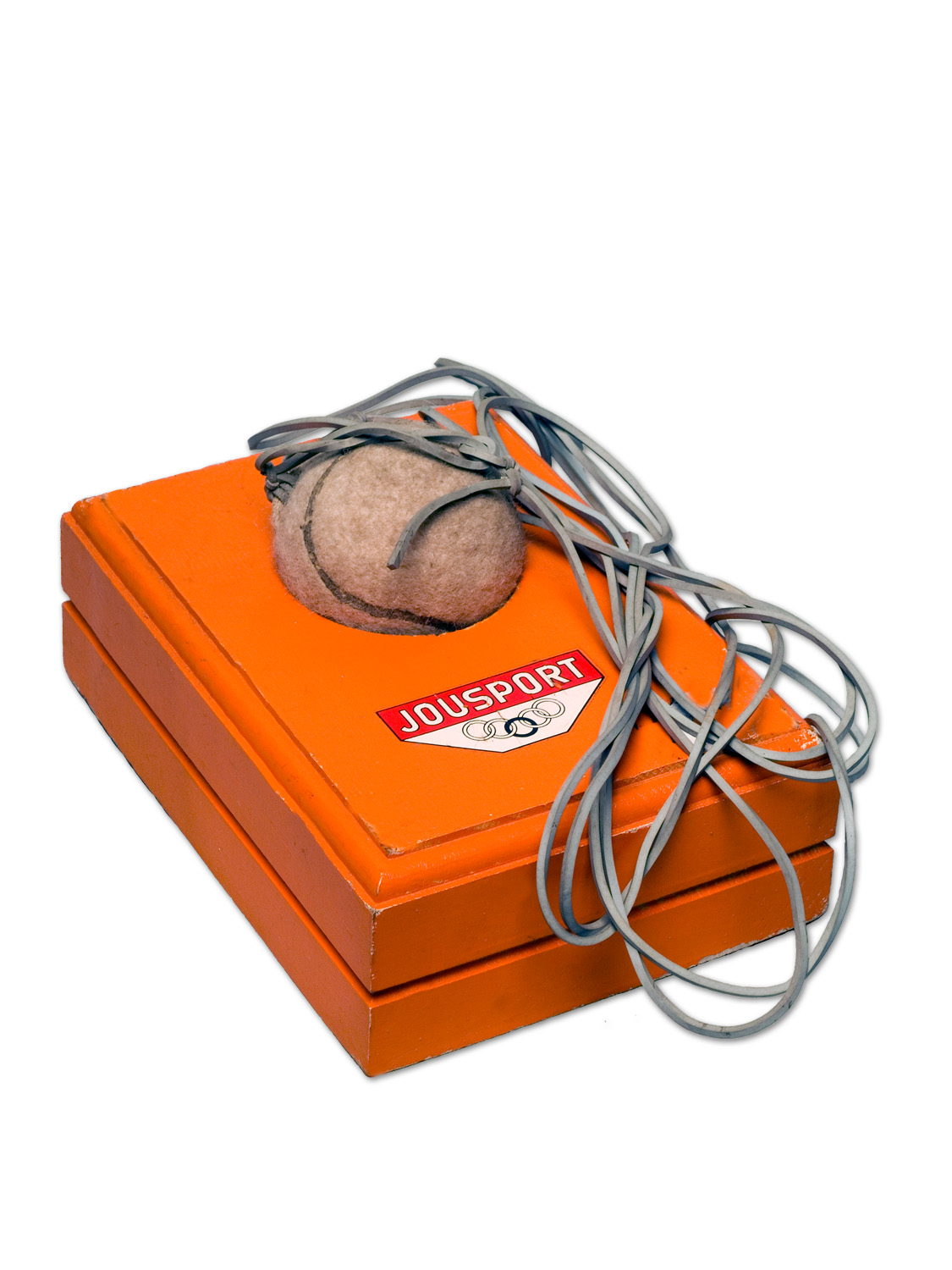
A jokari set

Jokari is a racket game principally for two players that can also be played alone. The game consists of a rubber ball attached to an anchor on the floor by means of a long elastic band, which makes the ball come back when a person hits it. Jokari is played with wooden paddles and is similar to swingball. The game has been highlighted as a way of engaging children in physical activity.

Jokari was invented in France in 1938 by Louis Joseph Miremont, then residing in Bayonne.

== Cultural references ==
The game has reached cult status in France and is featured in several comics, and also in the 2006 James Bond spoof movie OSS 117: Cairo, Nest of Spies, in the English translation of which, the game is called "paddleball". In the first chapter of Ian Fleming's 1963 novel On Her Majesty's Secret Service, James Bond also refers to jokari as he is watching a beach on the northern coast of France.

In 2015, a group of Belgian medical doctors reported a case of a woman who presented with a wandering spleen, naming this anatomical phenomenon "the Jokari sign".
