= Paddle (disambiguation) =

A paddle is an implement for mixing or pushing against liquids, typically in order to propel a boat.
Paddling is the act of propelling watercraft using paddles.

Paddle, Paddles or Paddling may also refer to:

== Aquatics ==
- Dog paddle, a simple swimming stroke
- Paddling pool, shallow swimming pool for toddlers and infants
- Hand paddle, a device used in swimming to enhance arm strength

== Sports and recreation ==
- Paddle, a flat-faced striking implement used in some racket sports, such as
  - Pickleball paddle
  - Platform tennis paddle
  - Table tennis paddle
- Paddle (game controller), a computer/video game controller
- POP tennis (originally known as paddle tennis), similar to tennis, but with key differences
- Richard Hadlee, a New Zealand cricketer nicknamed Paddles

== Other uses ==
- Kid Paddle, a Belgian comic strip by Michel Ledent
- Mixing paddle, device used to mix liquids with solids
- Traffic paddle, a device used by the police for traffic control
- An aircraft part for thrust vectoring
- Paddles, or paddle electrodes, parts of a manual external defibrillator
- Paddles, or wickets, valves to regulate flow of water into and out of canal lock chambers
- Paddles (Pillow Pal), a platypus made by Ty, Inc.
- Paddles, the callsign of the Landing Signal Officer on a US Navy Aircraft Carrier
- Paddles (cat) (d. 2017), a cat owned by New Zealand Prime Minister Jacinda Ardern
- Paddle (anatomy), the webbed foot of a semi-aquatic animal
- Spanking paddle, a device used to strike the buttocks

== See also ==
- Padel (disambiguation)
- Paddleball (disambiguation)
- Paddle steamer, a ship or boat with a steam engine and one or more paddle wheels
- Paddleboarding, a surface water sport
