= Paddle sport =

Paddle sport(s), or Paddlesport(s), may refer to:

- Paddling, sports that involve the use of paddles to propel a watercraft
- Paddle sport, a type of racket sport where the striking area of the racket is a solid or perforated hard surface, rather than a network of strings
