= 2024 FIR World Tour =

Global racketlon tournament

Tournament information
- Sport: Racketlon
- Location: Worldwide
- Dates: January 2024–December 2024

The 2024 FIR World Tour is the main global racketlon tour organized by the Federation of International Racketlon (FIR). The season ends in December with World Tour Finals.

The 2024 season consists of 20 events across the world.

== Schedule ==
Key

World Championships
World Tour Finals
Open Tournaments

Tournament	Men's elite winner	Women's elite winner	Men's elite doubles winners	Women's elite doubles winners	Mixed elite doubles winners
Thailand Open Challenger; Pattaya, Thailand; 5–7 January 2024	Mohammed Tarik Koubaa (MAR)	No competition	Samuel K S Li (HKG); Kevin Ho Ching Ng (HKG)	No competition	No competition
IWT RSL Finnish Open; Helsinki, Finland; 2–4 February 2024	René Lindberg (SWE)	Anna-Klara Ahlmer (SWE)	No competition	No competition	No competition
Hong Kong Open Challenger; Hong Kong, Hong Kong; 16–18 February 2024	Kevin Ho Ching Ng (HKG)	Tsz Yan Joyce Chan (HKG)	Steven Wai Kit Cheng (HKG); Kevin Ho Ching Ng (HKG)	Tsz Yan Joyce Chan (HKG); Elif Wong (HKG)	Tsz Yan Joyce Chan (HKG); Kevin Ho Ching Ng (HKG)
SAT Logan City; Australian Racketlon Open; Logan City, Australia; 23–25 February 2024	Sion Wiggin (NZL)	Amke Fischer (GER)	Samuel K S Li (HKG); Kevin Ho Ching Ng (HKG)	No competition	Amke Fischer (GER); Duncan Stahl (GBR)
IWT Polish Open; Warsaw, Poland; 15–17 March 2024	Joerg Kanonenberg (GER)	Anna-Klara Ahlmer (SWE)	Korbinian Heim (GER); Joerg Kanonenberg (GER)	Anna-Klara Ahlmer (SWE); Fabienne Dony (NED)	Anna-Klara Ahlmer (SWE); Malte Thyregod (DEN)
IWT French Open; Montreuil, France; 19–21 April 2024	Koen Hageraats (NED)	Pauline Cavé (FRA)	Nicolas Lenggenhager (SUI); René Lindberg (SWE)	Pauline Cavé (FRA); Kirsten I. Kaptein (NED)	Pauline Cavé (FRA); Matthew Davidson (GBR)
World Doubles Championships; Holbæk, Denmark; 9 & 10 May 2024	No competition	No competition	Leon Griffiths (GBR); Luke Griffiths (GBR)	Anna-Klara Ahlmer (SWE); Amke Fischer (GER)	Anna-Klara Ahlmer (SWE); Luke Griffiths (GBR)
IWT Nordic Racket Games; Holbæk, Denmark; 11 & 12 May 2024					
IWT German Open; Nussloch, Germany; 31 May – 2 June 2024					
IWT Swiss Open; Langnau, Switzerland; 28–30 June 2024					
SAT Irish Open; Banbridge, Ireland; 29 June 2024					
IWT Eurogames 2024 LGBTIQ+ Vienna, Austria; 17–20 July 2024					
Team & Singles; World Championships; Rotterdam, Netherlands; 31 July – 4 August 2024					
IWT Racket Masters Augsburg; Augsburg, Germany; 23–25 August 2024					
IWT Norwegian Open; Mysen, Norway; 6–8 September 2024					
SWT Austrian Open; Graz, Austria; 1–3 November 2024					
SWT Czech Open; Prague, Czech Republic; 15–17 November 2024					
SWT Willington Sports Club; Mumbai Indian Racketlon Open; Mumbai, India; 29 November – 4 December 2024					
World Tour Finals; Langau, Switzerland; 13 & 14 December 2024					
IWT Club La Santa Open; Lanzarote, Spain; 14–16 December 2024					
