= Table game =

Table game may refer to:

- Table game (casino), games of chance that are played against the casino and operated by one or more live dealers
- Tables game, a class of board game that includes backgammon
- Tabletop game, games that are normally played on a table or other flat surface

== See also ==
- Table football
- Table hockey
- Table squash
- Table tennis
