= Racketlon =

Combination of racquet sports

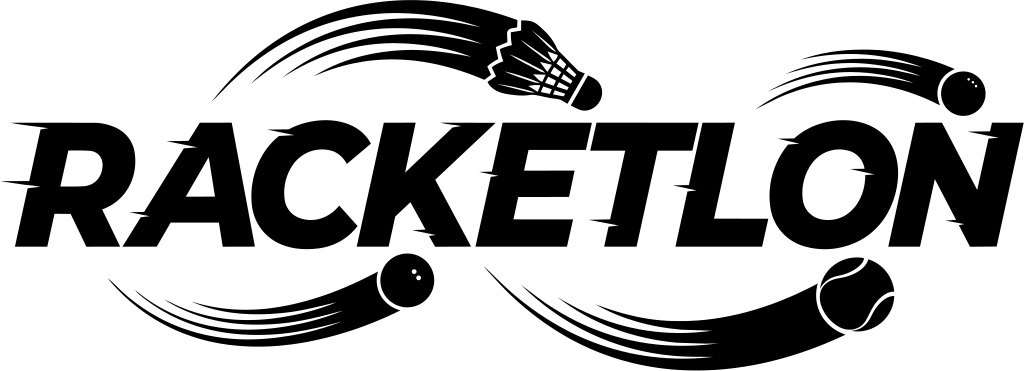
- Highest governing body: Federation of International Racketlon (since 2002)
- First played: 1980s

Characteristics
- Contact: No
- Team members: Single or doubles
- Type: Racket sport
- Equipment: Table tennis racket, celluloid, badminton racket, shuttlecock, squash racket, squash ball, tennis racket, tennis ball

Presence
- Olympic: none

Racketlon is a multisport competition in which competitors play a sequence of four popular racket sports: table tennis, badminton, squash, and tennis. It originated in Finland and Sweden and was modelled on other combination sports like triathlon and decathlon.

== World Federation ==
International Racquetball Federation
- Formation: 2002; 24 years ago
- Type: Sports federation
- Legal status: Governing body of Racketlon
- Purpose: Sport governance
- Region served: Worldwide
- Members: 36 national associations
- Affiliations: ARISF
- Website: Official website

The International Racketlon Federation (IRF) was founded on 15 September 2002. IRF renamed to FIR – Federation of International Racketlon. The first FIR managers were elected in October 2005 at a General Meeting in London.

=== Members ===
36 in March 2025:

1. Asia (5): Afghanistan, China, Hong Kong, India, Thailand
2. Oceania (2): Australia, New Zealand
3. Africa (1): South Africa
4. Americas (2): Canada, United States
5. Europe (26): Austria, Belgium, Croatia, Czech Republic, Denmark, Estonia, Finland, France, Germany, United Kingdom, Greece, Hungary, Ireland, Israel, Latvia, Luxembourg, Malta, Netherlands, Norway, Poland, Slovakia, Slovenia, Spain, Sweden, Switzerland, Turkey

== Rules ==
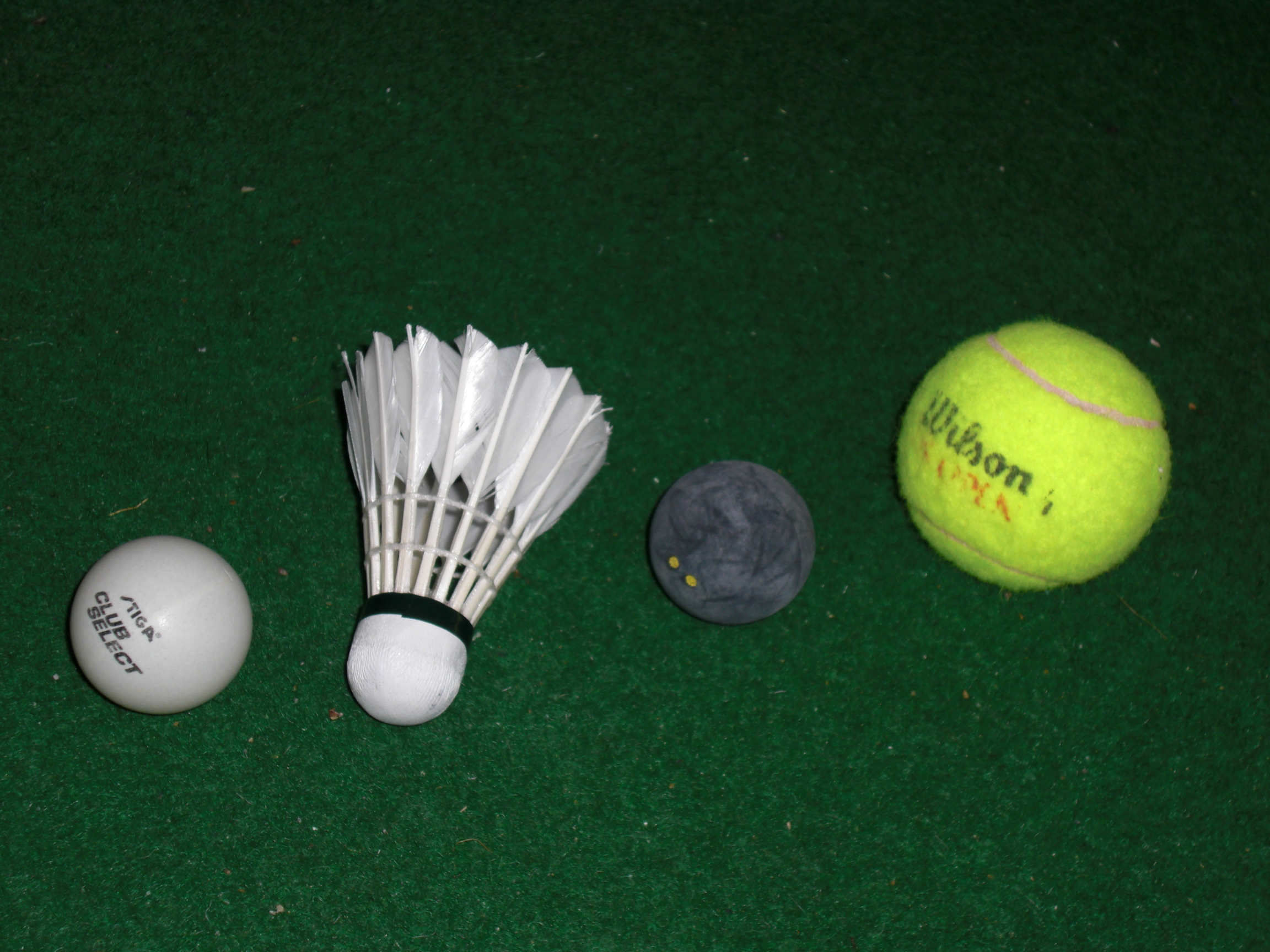
Balls of the sports that are part of Rackleton

In racketlon a player competes against an opponent, or a doubles pair, in each of the following four racket sports: table tennis, badminton, squash and tennis.

One set is played in each sport, in the order from the smallest to the biggest racket. Each of the four sets are played with running score to 21 points, with a margin of two points needed to finish a set. In team competitions, however, the individual matches are played to 11 points.

Each player serves two serves at a time, and except in table tennis, this is always one serve from the right side, and one serve from the left side of the court. Lots are drawn to decide who starts serving in table tennis, and this player will also start serving in squash. The other player hence starts serving in badminton and tennis.

The winner of a racketlon match is the player or doubles pair who has won the most points in total. When a player leads a match with more points than there are points left for the opponent to obtain, the match is over.

If the score is tied after all four sports, a "gummiarm"-point is played. This is a single extra point played in tennis, with only one serve to start off the rally. Lots are drawn to decide the server, and the winner of this rally wins the entire match.

In doubles, the squash set is played individually. One player from each pair plays until someone reaches 11 points. From here, the rest of the game is finished by the two remaining players.

With the exception of the above-mentioned rules, all rules that apply to the four individual sports also apply for racketlon.

== Tournaments ==
The first official world championship was held in 2001, between Finland and Sweden.

As of June 2016, the International World Tour contains 23 events divided into six challengers, 12 International World Tour tournaments, two Super World Tour tournaments and three World Championships (singles, doubles and national teams).

== World Championships - Podiums ==
The Racketlon World Championships began in 2001. No world championships were held in 2015 and 2017 (as continental championships ran instead) and 2020 (due to the COVID-19 pandemic).

=== Men's singles ===
Year	1st place, gold medalist(s)	2nd place, silver medalist(s)	3rd place, bronze medalist(s)
2025	Leon Griffiths (United Kingdom)	Luke Griffiths (United Kingdom)	Koen Hageraats (Netherlands)
2024	Luke Griffiths (United Kingdom)	Sylvain Ternon (France)	Jesper Ratzer (Denmark)
2023	Luke Griffiths (United Kingdom)	Leon Griffiths (United Kingdom)	Koen Hageraats (Netherlands)
2022	Luke Griffiths (United Kingdom)	Koen Hageraats (Netherlands)	Leon Griffiths (United Kingdom)
2021	Jesper Ratzer (Denmark)	Leon Griffiths (United Kingdom)	Morten Jaksland (Denmark)
2019	Jesper Ratzer (Denmark)	Morten Jaksland (Denmark)	Arnaud Génin (France)
2018	Jesper Ratzer (Denmark)	Lukas Windischberger (Austria)	Leon Griffiths (United Kingdom)
2016	Jesper Ratzer (Denmark)	Kasper Jønsson (Denmark)	Lukas Windischberger (Austria)
2014	Jesper Ratzer (Denmark)	Kasper Jønsson (Denmark)	Stefan Adamsson (Sweden)
2013	Jesper Ratzer (Denmark)	Kasper Jønsson (Denmark)	Calum Reid (United Kingdom)
2012	Stefan Adamsson (Sweden)	Kasper Jønsson (Denmark)	Jesper Ratzer (Denmark)
2011	Calum Reid (United Kingdom)	Jesper Ratzer (Denmark)	Stefan Adamsson (Sweden)
2010	Mikko Kärkkäinen (Finland)	Christoph Krenn (Austria)	Ismo Rönkkö (Finland)
2009	Christoph Krenn (Austria)	Mikko Kärkkäinen (Finland)	Joey Schubert (Austria)
2008	Mikko Kärkkäinen (Finland)	Magnus Eliasson (Sweden)	Michael Dickert (Austria)
2007	Mikko Kärkkäinen (Finland)	Magnus Eliasson (Sweden)	Christian Wall (Sweden)
2006	Mikko Kärkkäinen (Finland)	Magnus Eliasson (Sweden)	Stefan Adamsson (Sweden)
2005	Mikko Kärkkäinen (Finland)	Magnus Eliasson (Sweden)	Richard Thomson (Canada)
2004	Magnus Eliasson (Sweden)	Roland Helle (Sweden)	Mikko Kärkkäinen (Finland)
2003	Magnus Eliasson (Sweden)	Stefan Adamsson (Sweden)	Roland Helle (Sweden)
2002	Magnus Eliasson (Sweden)	Mats Källberg (Sweden)	Staffan Ericsson (Sweden)
2001	Mikko Kärkkäinen (Finland)	Toni Kemppinen (Finland)	Mats Källberg (Sweden) / Roland Helle (Sweden)

=== Women's singles ===
Year	1st place, gold medalist(s)	2nd place, silver medalist(s)	3rd place, bronze medalist(s)
2025	Myriam Enmer (France)	Anna-Klara Ahlmer (Sweden)	Pauline Cave (France)
2024	Stine Jacobsen (Denmark)	Amke Fischer (Germany)	Nathalie Vogel (Germany)
2023	Nathalie Vogel (Germany)	Myriam Enmer (France)	Silke Altmann (Germany)
2022	Myriam Enmer (France)	Astrid Reimer-Kern (Germany)	Stine Jacobsen (Denmark)
2021	Stine Jacobsen (Denmark)	Astrid Reimer-Kern (Germany)	Nathalie Vogel (Germany)
2019	Christine Seehofer (Austria)	Izzy Bramhall (United Kingdom)	Zuzana Severinová (Czech Republic)
2018	Christine Seehofer (Austria)	Astrid Reimer-Kern (Germany)	Bettina Bugl (Austria)
2016	Christine Seehofer (Austria)	Amke Fischer (Germany)	Nathalie Vogel (Germany)
2014	Zuzana Kubanova (Czech Republic)	Bettina Bugl (Austria)	Christine Seehofer (Austria)
2013	Nathalie Vogel (Zeoli) (Germany)	Sarina Leibig (Germany)	Marina Mezentzeva (Russia)
2012	Nathalie Vogel (Zeoli) (Germany)	Zuzana Kubanova (Czech Republic)	Sarina Leibig (Germany)
2011	Zuzana Kubanova (Czech Republic)	Nathalie Vogel (Zeoli) (Germany)	Silke Altmann (Germany)
2010	Michaela Björnström (Finland)	Natalie Lawrence (United Kingdom)	Martina Kakosova (Czech Republic)
2009	Michaela Björnström (Finland)	Marielle van der Woerdt (Netherlands)	Martina Kakosova (Czech Republic)
2008	Michaela Björnström (Finland)	Martina Kakosova (Czech Republic)	Linda Jansson (Sweden)
2007	Martina Kakosova (Czech Republic)	Michaela Björnström (Finland)	Linda Jansson (Sweden)
2006	Linda Jansson (Sweden)	Hanna Miestamo (Finland)	Martina Kakosova (Czech Republic)
2005	Lilian Druve (Sweden)	Susanna Lautala-Näykki (Finland)	Silke Altmann (Germany)
2004	Sarah McFadyen (United Kingdom)	Lilian Druve (Sweden)	Katy Buchanan (United Kingdom)
2003	Lilian Druve (Sweden)	Hanna Miestamo (Finland)	Susanna Lautala-Näykki (Finland)
2002	Lilian Druve (Sweden)	Susanna Lautala-Näykki (Finland)	Anneli Druve (Sweden)
2001	Katja Aminoff (Finland)	Lilian Druve (Sweden)	Marina Finth (Sweden)

=== Men's doubles ===
Year	1st place, gold medalist(s)	2nd place, silver medalist(s)	3rd place, bronze medalist(s)
2025	Leon Griffiths (United Kingdom) / Koen Hageraats (Netherlands)	Bastian Böhm (Germany) / Cornelius Radermacher (Germany)	Kresten Hougaard (Denmark) / Malte Thyregod (Denmark) /
2024	Luke Griffiths (United Kingdom) / Leon Griffiths (United Kingdom)	Morten Jaksland (Denmark) / Kresten Hougaard (Denmark)	Malte Thyregod (Denmark) / Max Oldehaver (Germany)
2023	Luke Griffiths (United Kingdom) / Leon Griffiths (United Kingdom)	Morten Jaksland (Denmark) / Kresten Hougaard (Denmark)	Koen Hageraats (Netherlands) / Nicolas Lenggenhager (Switzerland)
2022	Luke Griffiths (United Kingdom) / Leon Griffiths (United Kingdom)	Morten Jaksland (Denmark) / Kresten Hougaard (Denmark)	Lukas Windischberger (Austria) / Michi Dickert (Austria)
2021	Leon Griffiths (United Kingdom) / Calum Reid (United Kingdom)	Pekka Kainulainen (Finland) / Henrik Mustonen (Finland)	Morten Jaksland (Denmark) / Kresten Hougaard (Denmark)
2019	Morten Jaksland (Denmark) / Kresten Hougaard (Denmark)	Arnaud Génin (France) / Cédric Junillon (France)	Cornelius Radermacher (Germany) / Calum Reid (United Kingdom)
2018	Thorsten Deck (Germany) / Christian Wiessner (Germany)	Georg Stoisser (Austria) / Lukas Windischberger (Austria)	Morten Jaksland (Denmark) / Kresten Hougaard (Denmark)
2016	Kasper Jønsson (Denmark) / Jesper Ratzer (Denmark)	Christian Austaller (Austria) / Georg Stoisser (Austria)	Thorsten Lentfer (Germany) / Christian Wiessner (Germany)
2014	Kasper Jønsson (Denmark) / Jesper Ratzer (Denmark)	Michi Dickert (Austria) / Christoph Krenn (Austria)	Nikolay Angelov (Bulgaria) / Stelian Stankov (Bulgaria)
2013	Kasper Jønsson (Denmark) / Jesper Ratzer (Denmark)	Michi Dickert (Austria) / Christoph Krenn (Austria)	Thorsten Deck (Germany) / Markus Zeoli (Germany)
2012	Kasper Jønsson (Denmark) / Jesper Ratzer (Denmark)	Nikolay Angelov (Bulgaria) / Stelian Stankov (Bulgaria)	Marcel Weigl (Austria) / Joey Schubert (Austria)
2011	Mikko Kärkkäinen (Finland) / Ismo Rönkkö (Finland)	Michi Dickert (Austria) / Christoph Krenn (Austria)	Joey Schubert (Austria) / Alex Köpf (Germany)
2010	Michi Dickert (Austria) / Christoph Krenn (Austria)	Joey Schubert (Austria) / Alex Köpf (Germany)	Stefan Jezler (Switzerland) / Paul Twisterling (Netherlands)
2009	Mikko Kärkkäinen (Finland) / Ismo Rönkkö (Finland)	Oliver Kudicke (Germany) / Petr Vesely (Czech Republic)	Michi Dickert (Austria) / Christoph Krenn (Austria)
2008	Michi Dickert (Austria) / Christoph Krenn (Austria)	Marcel Weigl (Austria) / Mikko Kärkkäinen (Finland)	Rickard Persson (Sweden) / Stefan Adamsson (Sweden)
2007	Michi Dickert (Austria) / Christoph Krenn (Austria)	Oliver Kudicke (Germany) / Petr Vesely (Czech Republic)	Calum Reid (United Kingdom) / Marcel Weigl (Austria)
2006	Mathias Fagerström (Sweden) / Rickard Persson (Sweden)	Hendrik Hakansson (Sweden) / Christian Wall (Sweden)	Michi Dickert (Austria) / Christoph Krenn (Austria)

=== Women's doubles ===
Year	1st place, gold medalist(s)	2nd place, silver medalist(s)	3rd place, bronze medalist(s)
2025	Anna-Klara Ahlmer (Sweden) / Stine Jacobsen (Denmark)	Myriam Enmer (France) / Nathalie Vogel (Germany)	Flore Allègre (France) / Marie Jaussein (France)
2024	Anna-Klara Ahlmer (Sweden) / Amke Fischer (Germany)	Pauline Cavé (France) / Kirsten Kaptein (Netherlands)	Kaisu Anttila (Finland) / Linnea Koskinen (Finland)
2023	Izzy Bramhall (United Kingdom) / Stine Jacobsen (Denmark)	Amke Fischer (Germany) / Natalie Paul (Germany)	Stephanie Chung (United States) / Joanne Schickerling (United States)
2022	Stine Jacobsen (Denmark) / Zuzana Severinová (Czech Republic)	Myriam Enmer (France) / Anna-Klara Ahlmer (Sweden)	Martina Meißl (Austria) / Irina Olsacher (Austria)
2021	Stine Jacobsen (Denmark) / Zuzana Severinová (Czech Republic)	Amke Fischer (Germany) / Natalie Paul (Germany)	Bettina Bugl (Austria) / Christine Seehofer (Austria)
2019	Bettina Bugl (Austria) / Christine Seehofer (Austria)	Nicole Eisler (Switzerland) / Zuzana Severinová (Czech Republic)	Silke Altmann (Germany) / Amke Fischer (Germany)
2018	Natalie Paul (Germany) / Christine Seehofer (Austria)	Anna-Klara Ahlmer (Sweden) / Izzy Bramhall (United Kingdom)	Bettina Bugl (Austria) / Nicole Eisler (Switzerland)
2016	Natalie Paul (Germany) / Christine Seehofer (Austria)	Amke Fischer (Germany) / Martina Meißl (Austria)	Lieselot De Bleeckere (Belgium) / Line Irby Nørregaard (Belgium)
2014	Zuzana Kubanova (Czech Republic) / Christine Seehofer (Austria)	Lieselot De Bleeckere (Belgium) / Natalie Paul (Germany)	Bettina Bugl (Austria) / Lina Lindholm (Sweden)
2013	Zuzana Kubanova (Czech Republic) / Christine Seehofer (Austria)	Joyce Farro-Crouse (Netherlands) / Marielle Van Der Woerdt (Netherlands)	Lilian Druve (Sweden) / Sarina Leibig (Germany)
2012	Zuzana Kubanova (Czech Republic) / Simone Seitz (Austria)	Nicole Eisler (Switzerland) / Isabelle Tyrrell (United Kingdom)	Anneli Andersson (Sweden) / Lina Lindholm (Sweden)
2011	Carina Björnström (Finland) / Michaela Björnström (Finland)	Magda Kaminska (Poland) / Marta Jez (Poland)	Natalie Lawrence (United Kingdom) / Kerstin Peckl (Austria)
2010	Michaela Björnström (Finland) / Marielle v. d. Woerdt (Netherlands)	Simone Seitz (Austria) / Eva Hrabina (Hungary)	Andrea Scharnagl (Germany) / Silke Altmann (Germany)
2009	Martina Kakosova (Czech Republic) / Zuzana Kubanova (Czech Republic)	Michaela Björnström (Finland) / Kerstin Peckl (Austria)	Eva Hrabina (Czech Republic) / Rita Horvath (Czech Republic)
2008	Martina Kakosova (Czech Republic) / Linda Jansson (Sweden)	Agata Doroszkiewicz (Poland) / Sylwia Borek (Poland)	Karolina Pechova (Czech Republic) / Katerina Sodomkova (Czech Republic)
2007	Jana Lubasova (Czech Republic) / Radka Pelikanova (Czech Republic)	Karin Geertsma (Netherlands) / Irene Seifert (Germany)	Agata Doroszkiewicz (Poland) / Krystyna Szwajkovska (Poland)

=== Mixed doubles ===
Year	1st place, gold medalist(s)	2nd place, silver medalist(s)	3rd place, bronze medalist(s)
2025	Amke Fischer (Germany) / Leon Griffiths (United Kingdom)	Stine Jacobsen (Denmark) / Cornelius Radermacher (Germany)	Myriam Enmer (France) / Koen Hageraats (Netherlands)
2024	Anna-Klara Ahlmer (Sweden) / Luke Griffiths (United Kingdom)	Amke Fischer (Germany) / Leon Griffiths (United Kingdom)	Pauline Cavé (France) / Henrik Mustonen (Finland)
2023	Myriam Enmer (France) / Luke Griffiths (United Kingdom)	Stine Jacobsen (Denmark) / Cornelius Radermacher (Germany)	Anna-Klara Ahlmer (Sweden) / Malte Thyregod (Denmark)
2022	Zuzana Severinová (Czech Republic) / Leon Griffiths (United Kingdom)	Nathalie Vogel (Germany) / Morten Jaksland (Denmark)	Stine Jacobsen (Denmark) / Cornelius Radermacher (Germany)
2021	Christine Seehofer (Austria) / Morten Jaksland (Denmark)	Stine Jacobsen (Denmark) / Cornelius Radermacher (Germany)	Amke Fischer (Germany) / Leon Griffiths (United Kingdom)
2019	Christine Seehofer (Austria) / Dan Busby (United Kingdom)	Astrid Reimer-Kern (Germany) / Kresten Hougaard (Denmark)	Lieselot De Bleeckere (Belgium) / Peter Duyck (Belgium)
2018	Christine Seehofer (Austria) / Lukas Windischberger (Austria)	Astrid Reimer-Kern (Germany) / Kresten Hougaard (Denmark)	Anna-Klara Ahlmer (Sweden) / Morten Jaksland (Denmark)
2016	Natalie Paul (Germany) / Jesper Ratzer (Denmark)	Lina Lindholm (Sweden) / Kasper Jønsson (Denmark)	Amke Fischer (Germany) / Stefan Adamsson (Sweden)
2014	Natalie Paul (Germany) / Jesper Ratzer (Denmark)	Lina Lindholm (Sweden) / Kasper Jønsson (Denmark)	Amke Fischer (Germany) / Stefan Adamsson (Sweden)
2013	Zuzana Kubanova (Czech Republic) / Christoph Krenn (Austria)	Nathalie Vogel (Zeoli) (Germany) / Jesper Ratzer (Denmark)	Dawn Foxhall (United Kingdom) / Peter Duyck (Belgium)
2012	Zuzana Kubanova (Czech Republic) / Christoph Krenn (Austria)	Nathalie Vogel (Zeoli) (Germany) / Jesper Ratzer (Denmark)	Zsofia Troznai (Bulgaria) / Levente Nandori (Bulgaria)
2011	Marta Jez (Poland) / Joey Schubert (Austria)	Silke Altmann (Germany) / Alex Köpf (Germany)	Agata Doroskiewicz (Poland) / Krystof Samonek (Poland)
2010	Michaela Björnström (Finland) / Mikko Kärkkäinen (Finland)	Marielle van der Woerdt (Netherlands) / Paul Twisterling (Netherlands)	Anneli Andersson (Sweden) / Stefan Adamsson (Sweden)
2009	Michaela Björnström (Finland) / Mikko Kärkkäinen (Finland)	Katerina Sodomkova (Czech Republic) / Petr Vesely (Czech Republic)	Joyce Crouse (Netherlands) / Alwin Krist (Netherlands)
2008	Michaela Björnström (Finland) / Mikko Kärkkäinen (Finland)	Linda Jansson (Sweden) / Johan Porsborn (Sweden)	Martina Kakosova (Czech Republic) / Radim Socher (Czech Republic)
2007	Michaela Björnström (Finland) / Mikko Kärkkäinen (Finland)	Zsofia Troznai (Bulgaria) / Christoph Krenn (Austria)	Martina Kakosova (Czech Republic) / Radim Socher (Czech Republic)
2006	Katy Buchanan (United Kingdom) / Calum Reid (United Kingdom)	Lilian Druve (Sweden) / Joachim Nilsson (Sweden)	Natalie Lawrence (United Kingdom) / David Greatorex (United Kingdom)

=== Teams ===
Year	1st place, gold medalist(s)	2nd place, silver medalist(s)	3rd place, bronze medalist(s)
2025	Great Britain (United Kingdom)	France	Denmark
2024	Sweden	Great Britain (United Kingdom)	Germany
2023	Denmark	Great Britain (United Kingdom)	France
2022	Germany	Austria	Denmark
2019	Great Britain (United Kingdom)	Germany	Denmark
2018	Austria	Great Britain (United Kingdom)	Germany
2016	Denmark	Austria	Sweden
2014	Sweden	Denmark	Austria
2013	Germany	Austria	Sweden
2012	Austria	Germany	Sweden
2011	Finland	Sweden	Poland
2010	Austria	Finland	Germany
2009	Poland	Austria	Finland
2008	Sweden	Finland	
2007	Sweden	Germany	Finland
2006	Sweden	Austria	Germany
2005	Sweden	Austria	Finland
2004	Sweden	Germany	Great Britain (United Kingdom)
2003	Sweden	Finland	Great Britain (United Kingdom)
2002	Sweden	Finland	Great Britain (United Kingdom)

== See also ==
- List of racket sports
