= Roliball =

Racket sport

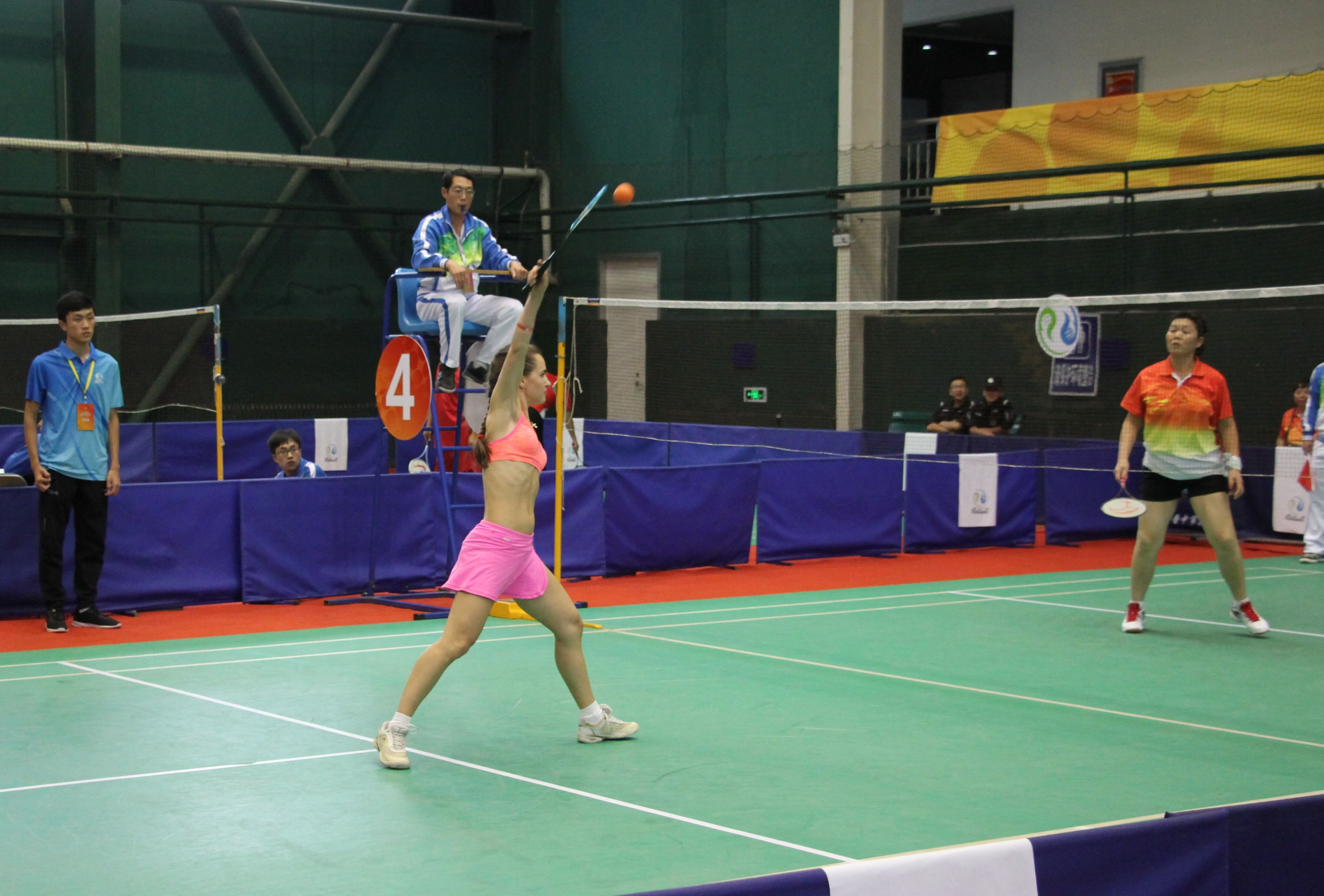
Women's single game

Roliball, (Chinese: 太极柔力球; pinyin: Tàijí róulìqiú; lit. 'taiji soft ball' also known as Bailong ball (Chinese: 太极白龙球; pinyin: Tàijí báilóngqiú; lit. 'taiji white dragon ball'), is a racket , ball and net sport. The racket has a silicone membrane and the ball is made from rubber and is partially filled with sand. The goal of the game is to land the ball on the opponent's side and prevent it from falling on your own half of the field. Contestants can be two players (multiplay single) or two pairs of players (pairs of the same sex - multiplay double, pairs of mixed sex - multiplay mixed).

== Origin and development ==
Roliball originated in 1991 in China, Shanxi Province, Jinzhong City. Initially it was developed as a method of rehabilitation of injured athletes. A new rehabilitation method was invented by the professor of physical culture and sports Bai Rong.

Since its inception and until the mid-2000s, roliball has developed mainly in China. During this period, the basic complexes of exercises with a racket and ball and the methodology of the training process were created. The development of roliball in other countries was facilitated by the creation of the European Association of Tai Chi Bailong Ball (TBBA) in 2005, in Germany, by Xiaofei Sui, one of the pupils of professor Bai Rong. The main activity of the Association is the development of the sport in Europeen countries, training of coaching staff, annual training courses, and organization of competitions.

The fastest rate of development of the roliball is in China, Hungary, Russia, Germany, Ukraine, the Netherlands, Portugal, Italy.

International Assembly of the Roliball (unofficial world championship) is held since 2012 every 2 years in the homeland of this sport in Jinzhong, China. In 2014, representatives from 11 countries took part in the competition, and in 2016, 13 countries were represented.

European Roliball Championship is held every 2 years since 2006 under the aegis of the TBBA. It has been held 4 times in Germany (2006, 2009, 2011, 2013), 1 time in the Netherlands (2015) and 1 time in Russia (2017).

National Championships are held in Hungary twice a year since 2012 and in Russia biennially since 2016.

== Rules of the game ==
Dimensions of the site for the single game are 5.18 m wide and 11.88 m length. Dimensions of the site for the double game are 6.10 m wide and 11.88 m length. In the middle of the site the net is stretched at a height of 1.75 m.

The goal of the game is to score more goals than the opponent.

Each set is played up to 15 points scored by one of the players. If both players have scored 14 points, the game is played until one of the opponents has an advantage in 2 points, but not more than 20 points.

To win the match, the player must win 2 sets. If each player won one set, they play the third set to determine the winner. The third set is played up to 10 points. The winner is the player who get 10 points first.

The field of each side is divided in the middle by a line into 2 zones: front (first zone) and rear (second zone). The serve is made from the second zone. An interstice during the serve into the front zone is an error and give the point to the opponent.

Each player performs two serves in turn. The player can serve at any point on the opponent's court, but keeping the basic principles of the roliball technique: the ball must describe the arc-shaped trajectory during the flight.

While receiving the ball hitting and slaps are forbidden - the ball should be taken along the tangent trajectory and return to the opponent on a circular trajectory. It is also forbidden to hold the ball on the racket, to receive and give the ball by a flat racket.

Attack, when the ball is sent along a downward trajectory, is allowed only from the second zone. Attack from the front zone is forbidden.

If the ball falls on the boundary line of the site, it is considered to have fallen into the area.

A ball touching the net during the flight and falling to the opponent's side is considered to be sent correctly.

A ball falling outside opponent's field is considered to be sent out and brings the point to the opponent. If the ball flew beyond the line of the opponent's side, but at the same time touched the opponent's racket, then the point is awarded to the player who performed the reception.

Mistakes that bring the point to the opponent are:

- the racket touching the floor or a body
- the ball touching the handle of the racket
- the racket or a body touching the net
- stepping on the opponent's side under the net during the game
- technical mistakes, associated with incorrect execution of receptions

Difference between the pair game and the single is that in the process of drawing the ball on the one half of the field it is allowed to make no more than one transfer to the partner.

== Equipment ==
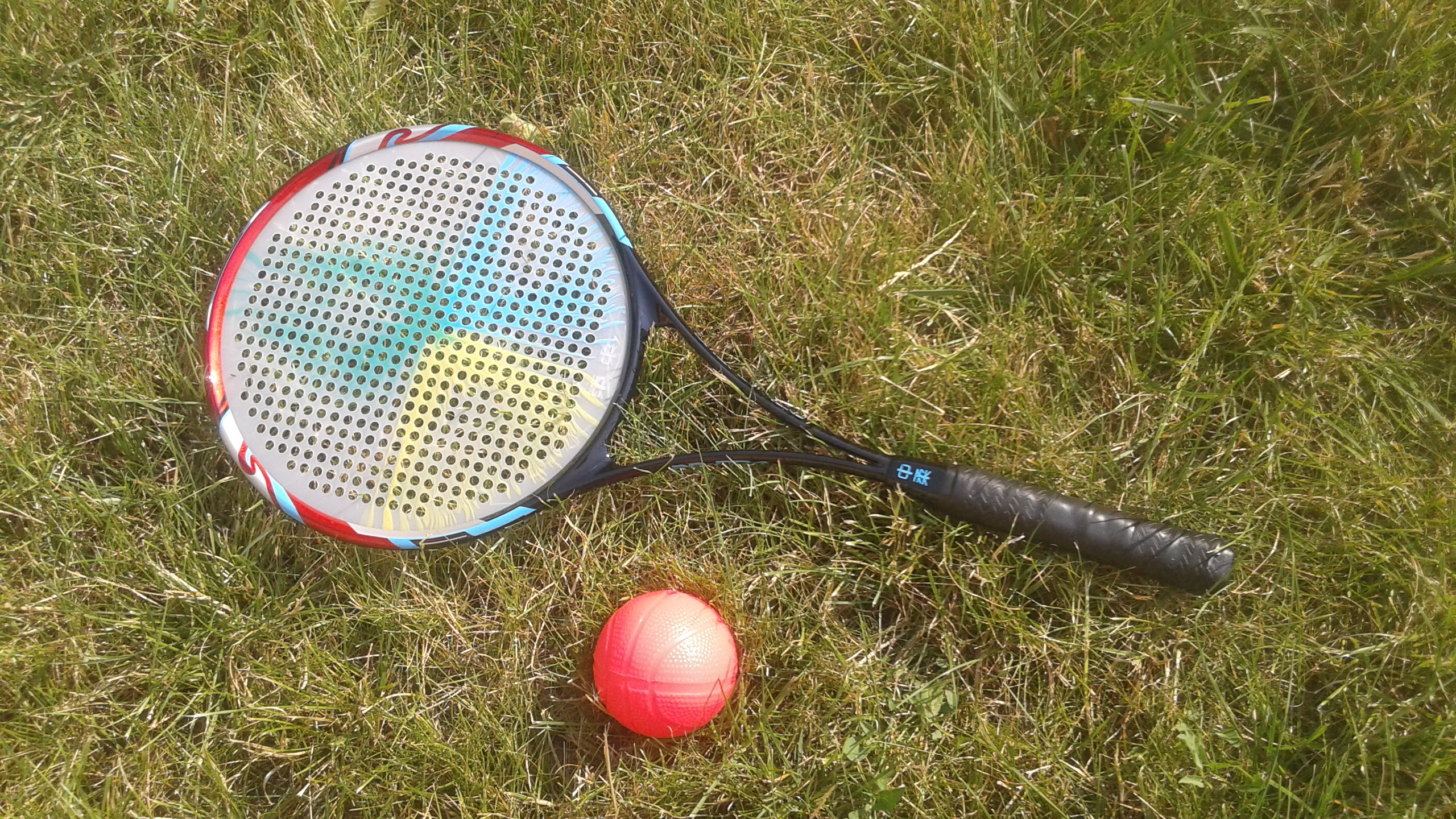
Racket and ball for roliball

The basic set of sports equipment for roliball includes a racket and a ball.

=== Racket ===
The size of the racket is from 47 cm to 54 cm. The racket weighs from 100 to 200 g depending on the material of the rim. The rim of the rackets can be made of plastic, aluminum, carbon or carbon fiber.

The surface of the racket is made of a silicone membrane. In modern rackets, the membrane is exchangeable. Depending on the tension force four different types of the membrane can be distinguished, from very soft with a slack more than 5 mm, to a rigid professional coaching racket without slack. The sagging level of the membrane corresponds to the athlete's level of training and the discipline of the roliball.

=== Ball ===
The ball for roliball contains sand, so it does not bounce off the racket during reception in the game, but allows smooth joining with it.

The ball weighs 50-55 g, its diameter is about 65 mm. Balls for roliball are made of rubber, plastic or leather. The most common balls are inflatable rubber balls, which are used for competitions.
