= Padel (disambiguation) =

Padel is a racket sport based on tennis originating from Mexico.

Padel may also refer to:

== People ==
- John Padel (1913–1999), British psychoanalyst and classicist
- Oliver Padel, historian and Cornish Place-name scholar, son of John
- Ruth Padel, British classical scholar, poet and journalist, daughter of John
- Una Padel (1956–2006, British criminal justice reformer

== Other ==
- Padel, a village in the taluka Devgad, district of Sindhudurg, Maharashtra

== See also ==
- Paddle (disambiguation)
