= Sphairee =

Form of tennis

Sphairee is a miniature form of tennis developed in Australia. Sphairee derives its name from the Greek word for ball sphaira.

== History ==
It was developed by Frederick Arthur George Beck in Sydney in 1961. The New South Wales Sphairee Association was formed in 1961. The first New South Wales Championships were held in 1963 with R.B. Frost and N.Brown winning the men's and women's titles respectively. In 1998, it was reported that the game had ebbed and it was played in 15 primary and high schools in Tasmania and on the first Tuesday of each month at the Greenwich Community Centre on Sydney's lower north shore. The game has been played in Mauritius, Papua New Guinea, New Zealand and the United Kingdom. The game has also been played since at least the 1970s at Camp Ponacka, a boys camp just south of Algonquin Provincial Park in Ontario, Canada, and includes four single-knockout elimination tournaments for the Munnfellow Cup every summer.

== Description ==
Rules of the game include:

- Field of play can be indoor or outdoor
- Court is 6.2 m by 2.2 m with the net being 0.6 m high.
- Bats are similar to oversized table tennis bats
- A perforated plastic ball 7 cm in diameter is used

== Bibliography ==
- Sphairee : the big game for the small court : the game of sphairee was devised by Frederick A. Beck. Carlingford, N.S.W. : The N.S.W. Sphairee Association, [197-?]
- Edwards, Ken, Sphairee in Unique games and sports around the world: a reference guide, London, Greenwood Press, 2001.
- Image of Fred Beck demonstratings the backhand grip to S Baker (front left) and Sydney Baker, 1965
