= Matkot =

Israeli paddle and ball game

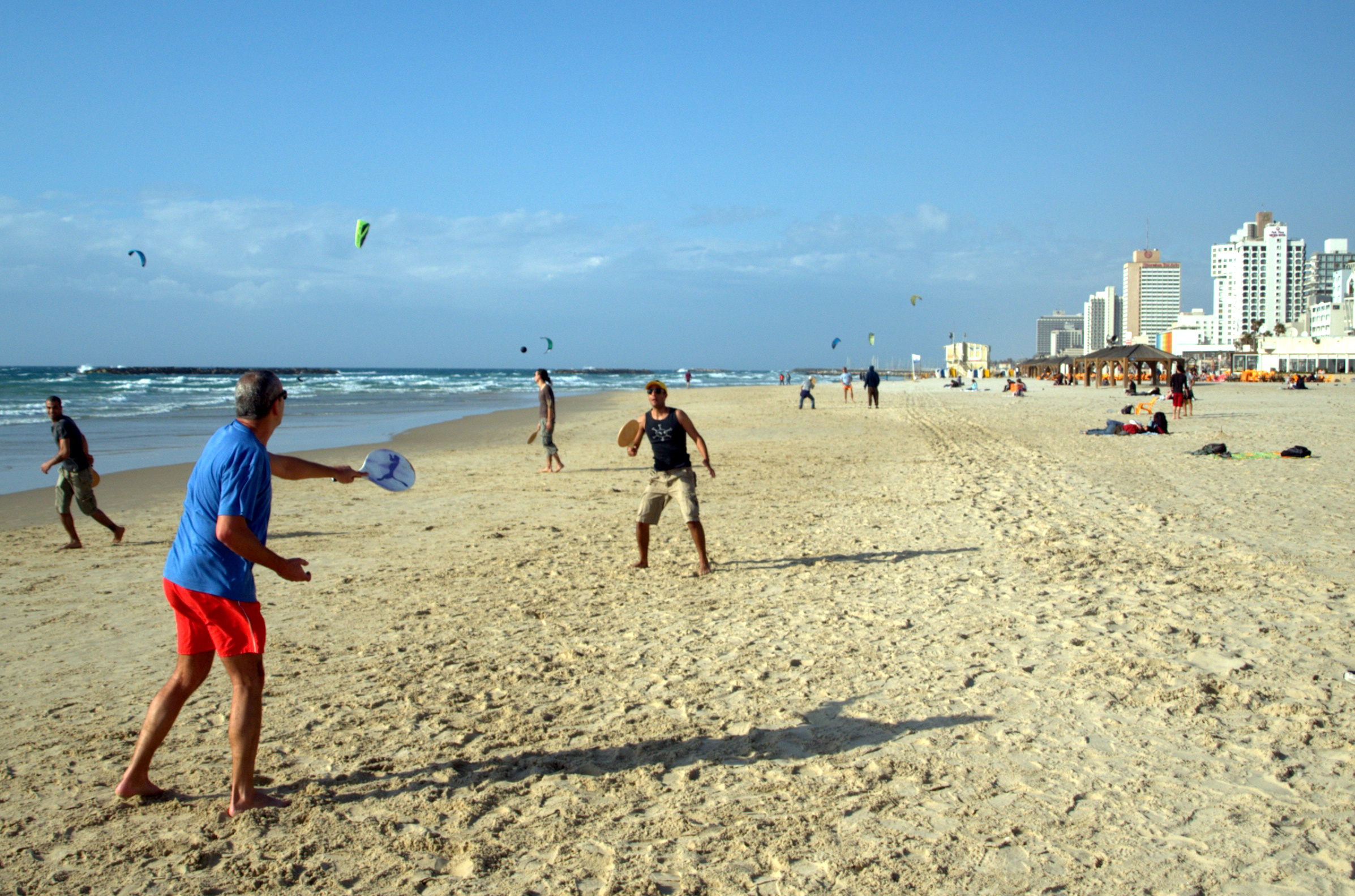
People playing matkot in Tel Aviv, Israel

Matkot (Hebrew: מטקות lit. "racquets") is a popular paddle sport in Israel similar to beach tennis, often referred to by Israelis as their national beach sport.

== History ==
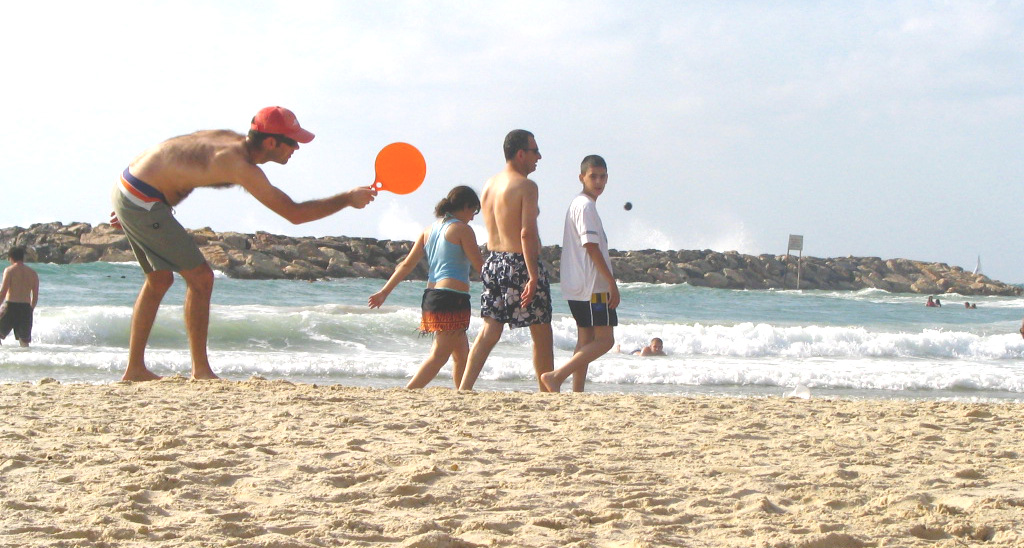
Player poised to hit the ball

Matkot has been played on the beaches of Tel Aviv since the 1920s. Early documentation of the game includes a 1932 Tel Aviv beach scene by Israeli artist Nahum Gutman showing two young men holding rounded paddles and hitting a ball back and forth on the beach.

The goal of the game is to hit a small rubber ball with a wooden racket as many times as possible without dropping it. Two or more players hit the ball back and forth using paddles. The sport is named after the racquet, the matka; the origin of this word is unclear.

The racquets are traditionally made of wood, although sometimes the handles are reinforced with a plastic covering. Carbon fiber is also used. The head of a racquet may vary somewhat in size and shape. The heads are circular and about 30 centimetres (12 in) in diameter. The racquet handles are short, and with very little trunk between the handle and the racquet head.

The standard ball used is the same ball as is used in squash. However, novice and intermediate players sometimes use a ball that is similar in size to a squash ball, but lighter and/or bouncier.

The game has developed a moderate level of popularity outside of Israel as a participatory sport, particularly where there is either a strong beach culture (e.g. Brazil, where it is also highly popular, but more commonly known as frescoball or frescobol), or a significant number of Israelis living abroad (e.g. Thailand). In the United States, the sport is known as kadima.

The first Israeli matkot competition was held in 2000, capped by a national championship in Tel Aviv.

== See also ==
- Racquet sport
- Sport in Israel
- Israeli inventions and discoveries
- Culture of Israel
