= Pang Pong =

Table sport

Pang Pong is a hybrid of tennis and ping pong. The name comes from the sound when the ball is being hit from one side to the next, pang - pong - pang - pong and is played on asphalt with racquets made of wood, a soft tennis ball and a net in form a wooden plank. Rules are similar to tennis or ping-pong but is played in shorter matches of 3 games.

== History ==
The game was invented in 1922, during the Taisho era (1912-1926), on the Hitachi Ltd. factory campus in Japan. Pang Pong was started as a lunch exercise, but has since grown into a local sport in Ibaraki Prefecture. Tournaments within Hitachi plants, between plants, and among citizens in Ibaraki prefecture in Japan are organized. Outside Japan the sport is little known, but tournaments have been organized in Harrodsburg, Kentucky, United States, connected to the Hitachi Automotive plant there.

== Rules ==
=== Court ===
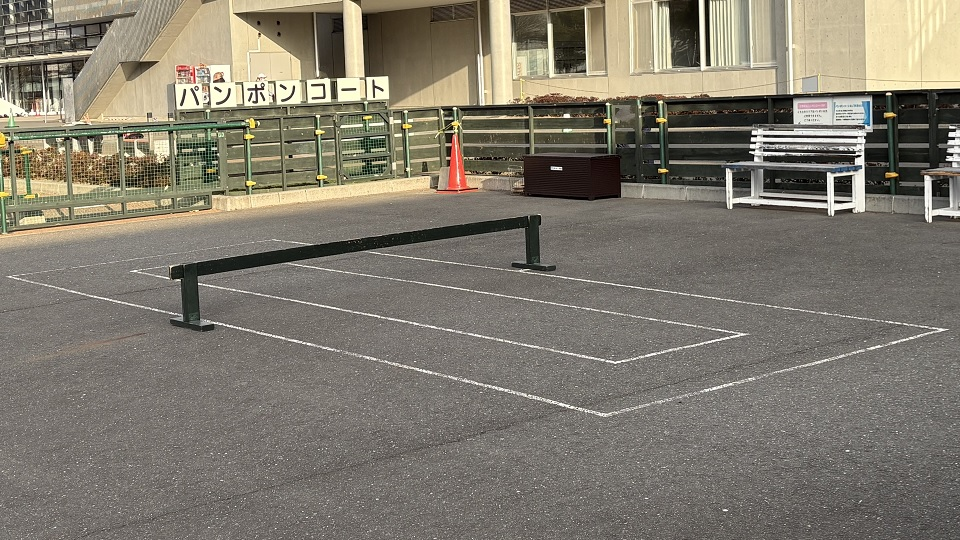
Pang Pong Court

Pang Pong is played on a rectangular flat court, normally outdoors on asphalt alternatively indoors on plastic floor. The court is 7 x 2.5 m with an inner serve area of 5.5 x 1 meter. The net is made of a 3-meter wooden plank, placed 40 cm above ground.

=== Equipment ===
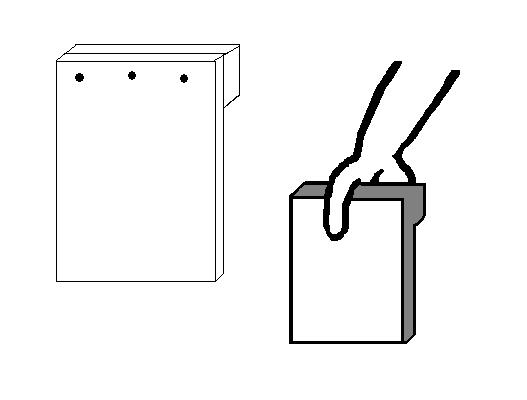
Pang Pong racket and grip

Racquets are made of wood, 30 x 20 cm and ca 10 mm in thickness. A simple ledge can be mounted on one of the short sides to make it easier to hold.

The ball is an air-pumped rubber ball, size like a tennis ball (ca 70 mm diameter). If the ball is dropped from 1 meter altitude it should bounce back up 50–60 cm if it is correctly pumped.

=== The game ===
Before the match a coin is flipped to determine the first server. One of the players will serve to start the game and the serve is hit into the receivers inner serve area without touching the net/plank. The receiver will hit the ball back into the servers court side.

=== Scoring ===
A game consists of a sequence of points played with the same player serving. The game is won by the first player to have won at least four points in total. If the score is 3-3 it is necessary to win by two points. At 4-4 it is enough to win by only one point.

=== Serve ===
The serve is alternated between the players, point by point. The server must stand behind the base line and between the side lines. The receiver can stand at any place in the court. It is not allowed to hit the serve with the racket above the waist. The server only has one attempt to make a successful serve. The receiver is not allowed to hit the ball before it has touched the ground.

=== Doubles ===
If team A meets team B, first player A1 will serve with B1 as receiver. In the following game B1 serves to A2, then A2 against B2, etc.

== Nordic Pang Pong Championships 2014 ==
In connection with the Nordic Microscopy Meeting, Scandem 2014, in Linköping, Sweden, on June 9–13, 2014, the first Nordic championship in Pang Pong will be held.
