= Road tennis =

Variation of tennis invented in Barbados

- Highest governing body: Professional Road Tennis Association
- First played: 1930s

Characteristics
- Contact: No
- Type: Outdoor
- Equipment: Wooden "net", bald tennis ball, wooden rackets
- Venue: Road or court

Road tennis is a variation of tennis invented in Barbados in the 1930s by primarily local working class Barbadians who could not afford to play lawn tennis. Though mainly concentrated in the island nation of Barbados, it has been since further introduced to California and the wider Caribbean. It is often played on public residential roads or at schools, community centres and recreational areas around the island where most road tennis courts are located, either on asphalt or concrete pavement surfaces.

== Equipment ==
The game is played using two wooden rackets and one tennis ball with the fur removed.

An eight-inch-high plank wood net is used on the court or road, which requires 21x10 feet of space to play.

== Rules ==
The first player to 21 points is declared the winner. There are no volleys in the game and the server alternates after five points have been scored. Similar to table tennis, each serve must bounce once in the server's court.

Some popular competitions include Monarch of the Court in Barbados. The governance for the sport is the Professional Road Tennis Association.

Champions

The player with the most attained tournament wins is Julian “Michael Jackson” White, other known as "The World Boss".
