= Qianball =

Racket sport similar to tennis or squash

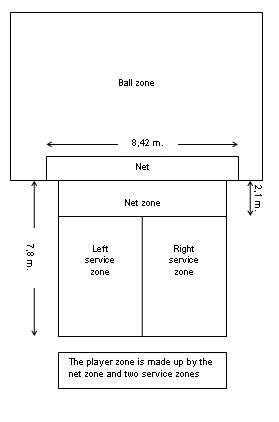
Qianball court

Qianball is a racket sport similar to tennis or squash. It is played with both players on the same side of the net, and the ball is attached to a tether.

The sport was popularized in Denmark, but it has been claimed that it originated from a Chinese game, possibly called Qianlongball. In Denmark the game is organised under KFUM (Danish branch of YMCA sport).

The game is played on a court a little smaller than a tennis court with both players placed on the same side of the net. The player side of the net measures 7.6 * 7.8 m, and the other side of the net should be app. 10 * 12 m, but there are no exact rules for this.It can be played by two or four players, or by a single person practicing. Qianball can be played on any flat hard surface, indoors or outdoors, no matter the weather.

The game involves:

- One court measuring 7.6 by 7.8 meters in the player zone and 10 by 12 meters in the ball zone
- Two or four players playing respectively single or double
- One ballbag with weight or floor embedded hook
- A qianball racket for each player
- A qianball ball with rubber band
- A net or similar at a height of 81 cm

The game is played by placing the ball bag 2.1 metres from the net in the so-called Qianball point. The end of the rubber band is attached to the turning rings or the floor embedded hook. The players are positioned on the same side of the net as in squash and they take turns to serve 2 consecutive serves before changing sides. The game is decided in three sets to 15, playing with a running score. The ball may not touch the ground in the player zone or the opposing player will score a point, and may only touch the ground once in the ball zone.
