= Frescobol =

Beach sport

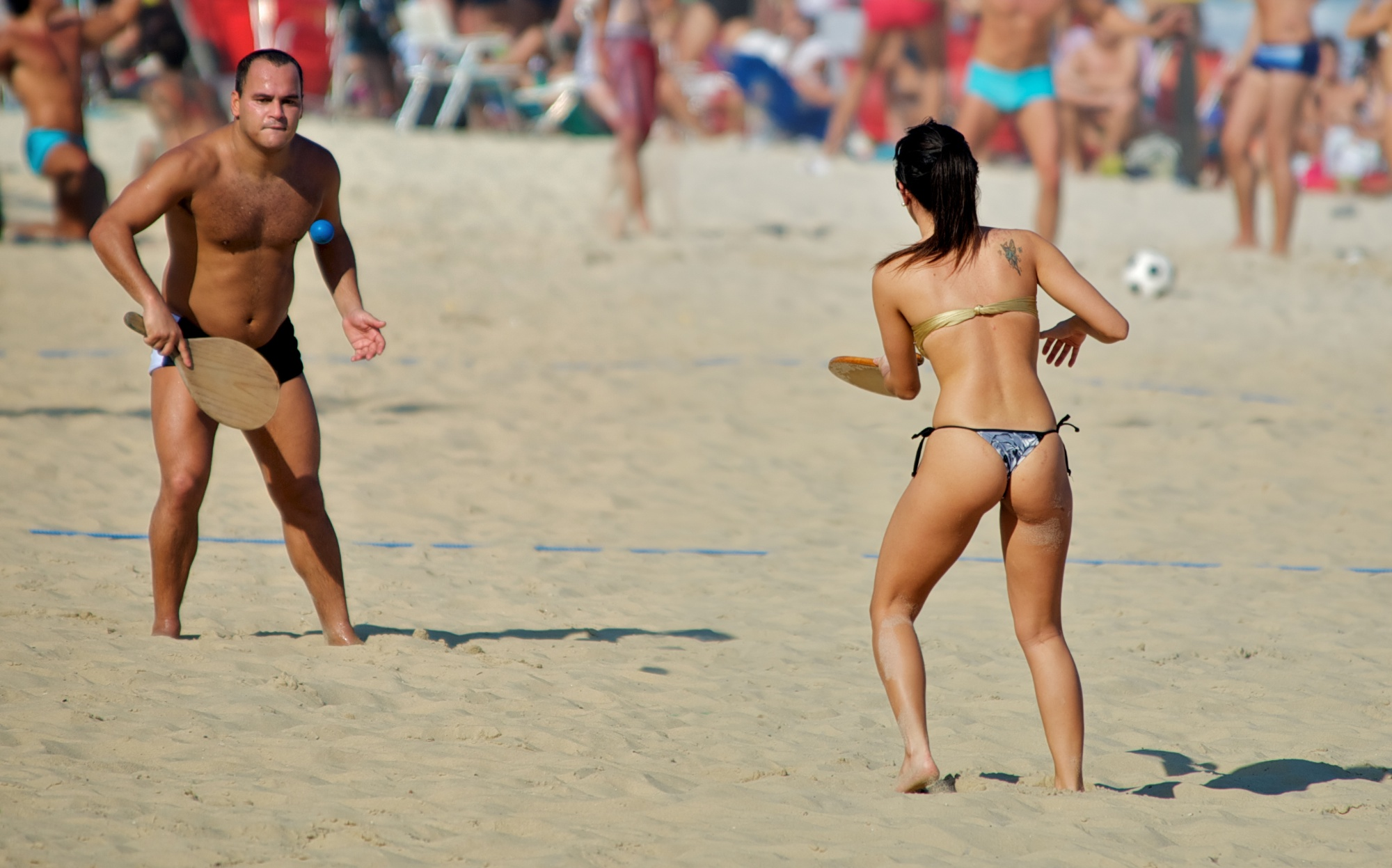
Players playing frescobol in Ipanema.

Frescobol (Portuguese, lit. fresh ball) is a racket sport originating in Brazil in the 1950s. The game is played between two (or occasionally three) players with solid rackets, most often made of wood or fibreglass, and the aim of the game is to hit a small rubber ball between players for as long as possible. It is often considered a beach activity.

== Equipment ==
The racket used is made of wood or composite materials such as fibreglass or carbon fibre. It can be hollow or solid. The maximum measurements are a width of 25 centimetres and a height of 50 centimetres. It should weigh between 300 and 400 grams, depending on player preference. A non-slip grip can be added to the handle.

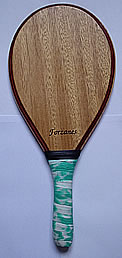
A frescobol racket (or paddle).

The ball is a hollow sphere of pressurized rubber. Often racquetball balls are used.

== Similar games ==
Frescobol is very similar to the Israeli sport matkot/kadima. They are identical in how they are played, but matkot is usually played with round rackets instead of the teardrop shaped rackets used in frescobol.
