= Totem tennis =

Racquet ball game

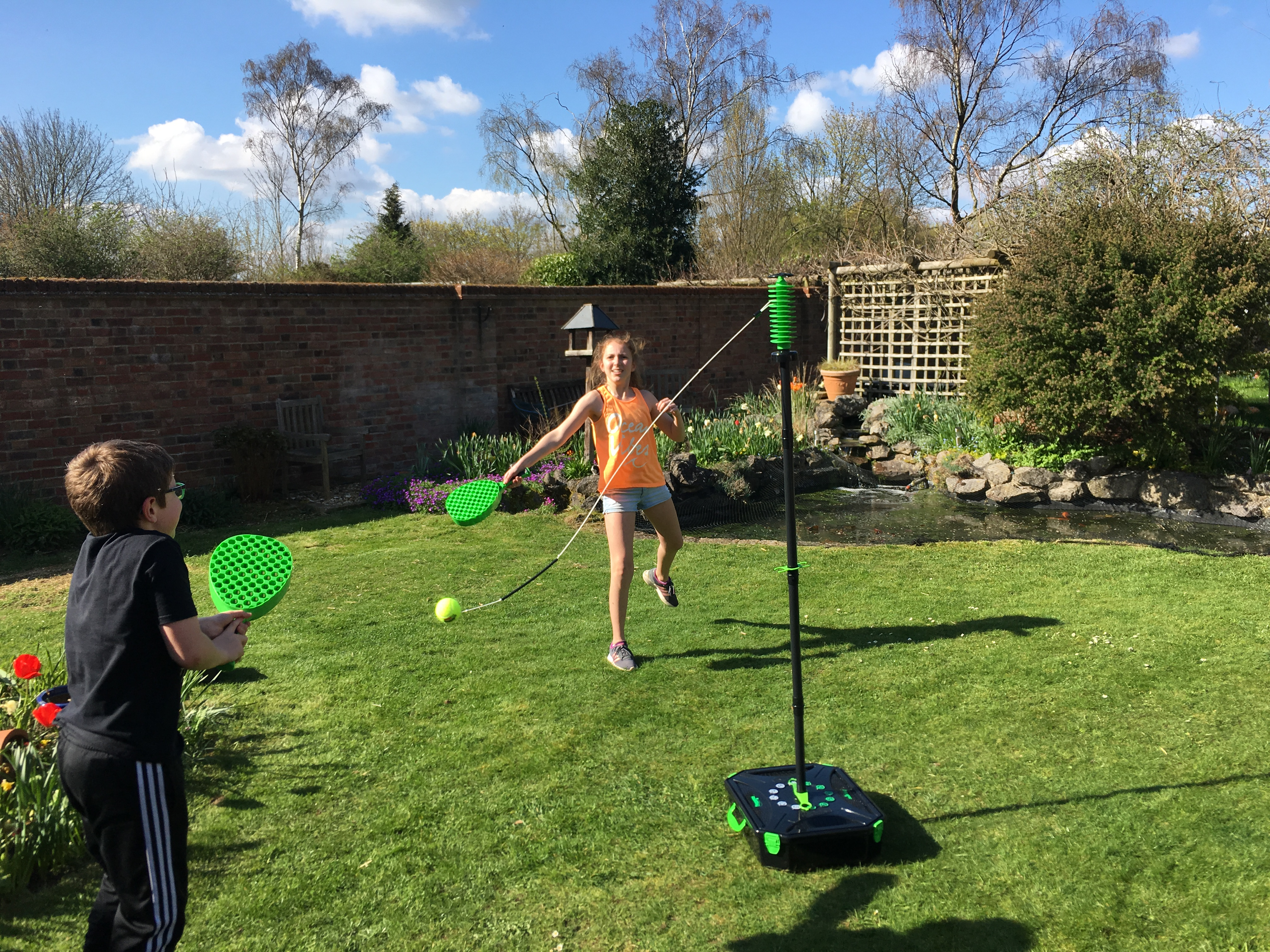
Two children playing swingball

Totem tennis (also known as tether tennis or swingball) is a game where two players use racquets to strike a tennis or sponge ball which has been attached with string to the top of a vertical pole. The pole is either driven into soft ground or anchored with a heavy base.

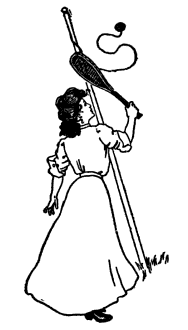
Illustration of tether tennis (1904)

Tether tennis has been known since the early 1900s.

The British company Mookie Toys claims that in 1993 it acquired the global rights for the Swingball brand, the product sold since 1974. In Mookie Toys Swingball, there is a helical coil of wire at the top of the pole and the competitors hit the ball clockwise or anticlockwise around the pole to make it go up or down the coil, the winner being the person who gets the ball to their end of the coil, top or bottom.

Other commercial swingball toys have a rotating component to attach the string, so that it does not wrap around the pole.

Judy Murray, The mother of British tennis star Andy Murray asserts that part of Andy's success may be attributed to swingball he used to play at their home in Scotland in early childhood.

The game was once sold in the United States under the name Zimm Zamm.
