= Squash tennis =

American variant of squash

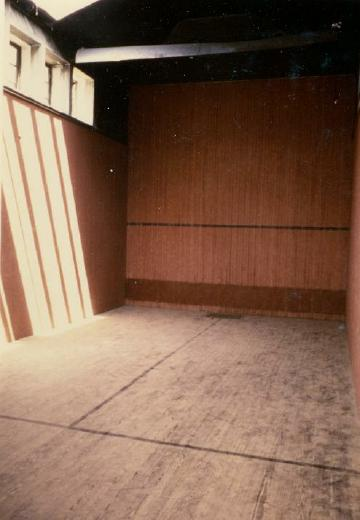
Plum Orchard squash tennis court

Squash tennis is an American variant of squash, one played with a ball and racquets that are more similar to the equipment used for lawn tennis, and with somewhat different rules. The game offers the complexity of squash and the speed of racquetball.

== Court ==
Squash tennis is played in various four-walled courts. The front wall (against which the ball is served) features a telltale (usually clad in tin) at the bottom couple feet from the floor, a service line about 6 feet (1.8 m) from the floor, and an out-of-bounds line around 16 feet (4.9 m) from the floor. The back wall out line is 4.5 feet (1.4 m) from the floor. There are two required lines on the floor: a service line about 10 feet (3.0 m) from the back wall, and a center court line running at least from the front wall to the service line. Unlike a squash racquets court, there are no service boxes. There are four types of courts:

=== North American squash court ===
A North American squash court is 18.5 by 32 feet (5.6 by 9.8 m). Originally designed for the related game of squash racquets, by the early 1930s the National Squash Tennis Association (NSTA) approved play on this kind of court. The dimensions are quite similar to the official squash tennis court. The only required modifications are the addition of a 4.5-foot (1.4 m) back wall line (in N. American squash the back wall line is 6.5 feet or 2.0 metres from the floor) and the center court line on the floor. Temporary lines can easily be added with blue painter's tape. The problem today is that as the North American version of squash becomes less popular, new courts are not being built, and many old ones are being converted to other uses.

=== Squash tennis court ===
In 1910 the NSTA adopted a standard court size of 17 by 32.5 feet (5.2 by 9.9 m). Although many of these were built in the New York area, after play was authorized on a North American squash court they began to disappear. It did not make economic sense to maintain a specialty court when a more versatile one was acceptable.

=== International squash court ===
An International squash court is 21 by 32 feet (6.4 by 9.8 m). The additional lines will need to be added. The extra width of the court makes the various multi-walled shots more difficult or impossible, so experienced players prefer to use a North American court. However, a 21-foot (6.4 m) court is often the only one generally available, particularly outside North America.

=== Non-standard courts ===
Originally the game was played on a racquets court, then on fives courts. Before 1911 there were no standards for court size, and ones constructed specifically for squash tennis varied from each other somewhat. They were constructed at private estates and clubs. At least one of these courts survives today in a playable condition. The court at Plum Orchard was fully restored in 2008 with the tins in place and working electric lights. It was added to George Lauder Carnegie's "Plum Orchard" estate on Cumberland Island, Georgia, in the winter of 1903/04, and is now owned by the National Park Service. An exhibit on squash tennis history has recently been installed in the mansion, which is occasionally open for public tours.

== Equipment ==
Required equipment is fairly simple and inexpensive: junior tennis racquets and standard lawn tennis ball. In decades past, modified tennis balls were manufactured for the game. They had higher pressure and were slightly smaller than tennis balls. The last specially manufactured ball was green, so that it could be more easily seen against white walls. Early courts had dark wood walls so that white tennis balls could be seen. Players now either use a marker to darken a yellow ball, or use colored tennis balls (such as the pink ball sold on a limited basis by Penn to raise money for breast cancer research). Blue painter's tape can be used to add the additional lines on the floor and back wall of squash racquets courts.

== Manner of play ==
Squash tennis is played by two players. An illustrated playing guide with rules was published by the NSTA in 1968 (see external links below).

=== Serve ===
At the beginning of the first game, a spin of the racket is used to decide who serves first. In subsequent games of a match, the player who won the previous game serves first.

The server stands behind the floor service line, either to the left or right of the center line. Tossing the ball in the air, he strikes it with the racquet before the ball hits the ground. The service is good if the ball:

- first hits the front wall above the service line and below the out line (touching the lines is prohibited),
- without hitting the back wall, lands in front of the service line on the opposite side of the court, left or right (depending on the side the server).

This is the major difference between squash tennis and squash racquets. In the latter sport the ball must go beyond the floor service line into the receiver's box. But it is similar to lawn tennis, as the ball is served diagonally and lands in front of the service line. In squash racquets the server also stands in toward the side wall, rather than in the center of the court.

At the beginning, the server can choose which side he starts, left or right. One fault is allowed if the ball does not go out (i.e. does not hit or go above the out lines, strikes the telltale, nor hits the floor before hitting the front wall). If the server wins the point he must then switch to the opposite side of the court (left or right) before serving again, alternating each serve.

The standard serve is a gently hit ball that strikes just below the front wall out line, comes back in a high arc, then bounces just in front of the floor service line where it meets the side wall. Slight cut will help the ball hug the wall. A high bounce along the wall is more difficult to return. The receiver cannot strike the ball before it bounces on the floor.

=== Rally ===
After a fair serve the receiver strikes the ball so that it either directly or indirectly hits the front wall before hitting the floor a second time, goes out of bounds, or strikes the tin. Players thus alternate hitting the ball until one fails to make a fair return. The ball can only be played off the back wall if the ball first hits the back wall. A ball may hit anywhere on the back wall if it first bounces off the floor—otherwise it must stay below the back wall out line. Unintentional interference results in a "let"—the point is replayed.

=== Scoring ===
A game is played until one player reaches 15 points, except if the score first reaches 13/13 or 14/14. When 13/13 is reached, the receiver decides if the game should go to 15, 16, or 18 points. If it reaches 14/14 (without having been 13/13) the receiver decides on either 15 or 17. One does not have to win by two points. Originally only the server could score; if he lost the rally he would lose the right to serve. Current rules give the point and the serve to the winner of a rally.

A match is best three out of five games.

== History ==
The games of squash racquets and its parent sport, racquets, spread to America in the 1880s with the nation's first courts built at St. Paul's School, in Concord, New Hampshire. Due to a delay in shipping the proper racquets' equipment, the boys used balls and racquets for the game of lawn tennis that had also been recently introduced to the country. Even after the proper equipment arrived, some still continued to use tennis equipment on both kinds of courts.

In the 1890s both squash racquets and squash tennis had spread to adults in Boston, and play started to become more formalized. In 1898, after the construction of a court at the Tuxedo Club in Tuxedo Park, New York, squash tennis became popular among members of New York society. Private courts were built on estates owned by such millionaires as William C. Whitney, J. P. Morgan, and Andrew Carnegie's nephew George Lauder Carnegie. By 1905, the Racquet and Tennis Club, Harvard, Princeton, and Columbia Clubs in Manhattan had courts, as did Brooklyn's Crescent A. C. and the Heights Casino.

In 1911 the National Squash Tennis Association was founded and organized by the banker, John W. Prentiss, Harvard Club of New York. Rules, equipment, and court dimensions became formalized.

Briefly the sport gained popularity and some limited play in other cities such as Detroit, Buffalo, Chicago, Boston, Philadelphia, but soon squash racquets overshadowed squash tennis. But in New York City the game maintained a strong following during the 1920s and 1930s. A decision to introduce a highly pressurized ball hastened the decline of the sport. A faster ball was preferred by advanced players, but it discouraged novices. In an effort to make the game more accessible, tournament play was authorized on squash racquets courts. But for many years the sport attracted few new players. During World War II the special ball was no longer manufactured, so advanced players started to lose interest.

Two outstanding champions of the fifties were Robert Reeve and Trudy Porter. League play and tournaments continued with energy supplied by Norman F. Torrance in the 1950s. The sixties saw a revival as younger players took up the game and Jim Prigoff became National Champion and later President of the Squash Tennis Association and Richard C. "Dick" Squires became active when a special ball was once again available to players. Prigoff dominated the Nationals in the 1960s beating both Squires and Bacallao until he retired from the game in 1969. But competition by the new game of racquetball prevented these later attempts from making any headway with the public. The annual nationals became the only formal tournament, but became the virtual private property of two men, Pedro A. Bacallao (1969–1980, 1986) and Gary Squires (1982–1983, 1985, 1987–2000) son of Dick Squires.

== Squash tennis status ==
The game is virtually extinct. There are no organized tournaments. The game is played on a regular basis only by about a dozen players at the Harvard Club in New York City; although longtime enthusiast Bill Rubin stated that there are a few young, very talented, new players. The NSTA has not held a meeting in several years.

The basic equipment is inexpensive, however, and for those with access to a squash court it can easily be enjoyed for its recreational and exercise value. Dick Squires published a guide to the sport in 1968. The booklet was not copyrighted, and is available online at Project Gutenberg. The guide includes pointers on how to play the game, history, rules, and a list of all national champions.

== See also ==
- Table squash
- Volley squash
