= Table squash =

Sport

Table squash is a sport for two players which is an evolution of table tennis and uses similar rules and equipment. The game is played by placing a table tennis table against a playing wall with the net remaining on the table perpendicular to the wall. Each player stands on the opposite side of the table facing the wall on either side of an imaginary line as if the net was extended backwards. Players each use table tennis rackets and take turns to play a table tennis ball off the playing wall onto the table on the opponent's side of the net, except on serves where the ball must first bounce on the server's side of the net on the table.

== History ==
The game was created in 2009 in Leeds, United Kingdom. Originally played using a domestic kitchen table, considerably smaller than a table tennis table, the game was created as an alternative to traditional table tennis for locations where there isn't room for a full size table and room to navigate around it. The game originated with few rules as a social occasion to strike a ball around before the initial draft of the official rules was generated in October 2009.

== Equipment ==
Any standard table tennis bats and balls maybe used, along with a standard sized table tennis table, as prescribed by the International Table Tennis Federation. The table is placed against the wall, and the net should be perpendicular to the wall with the regulation 15.25 cm net overhang left as a gap to the wall known as the crack.

== Rules ==
=== Commencing Play ===
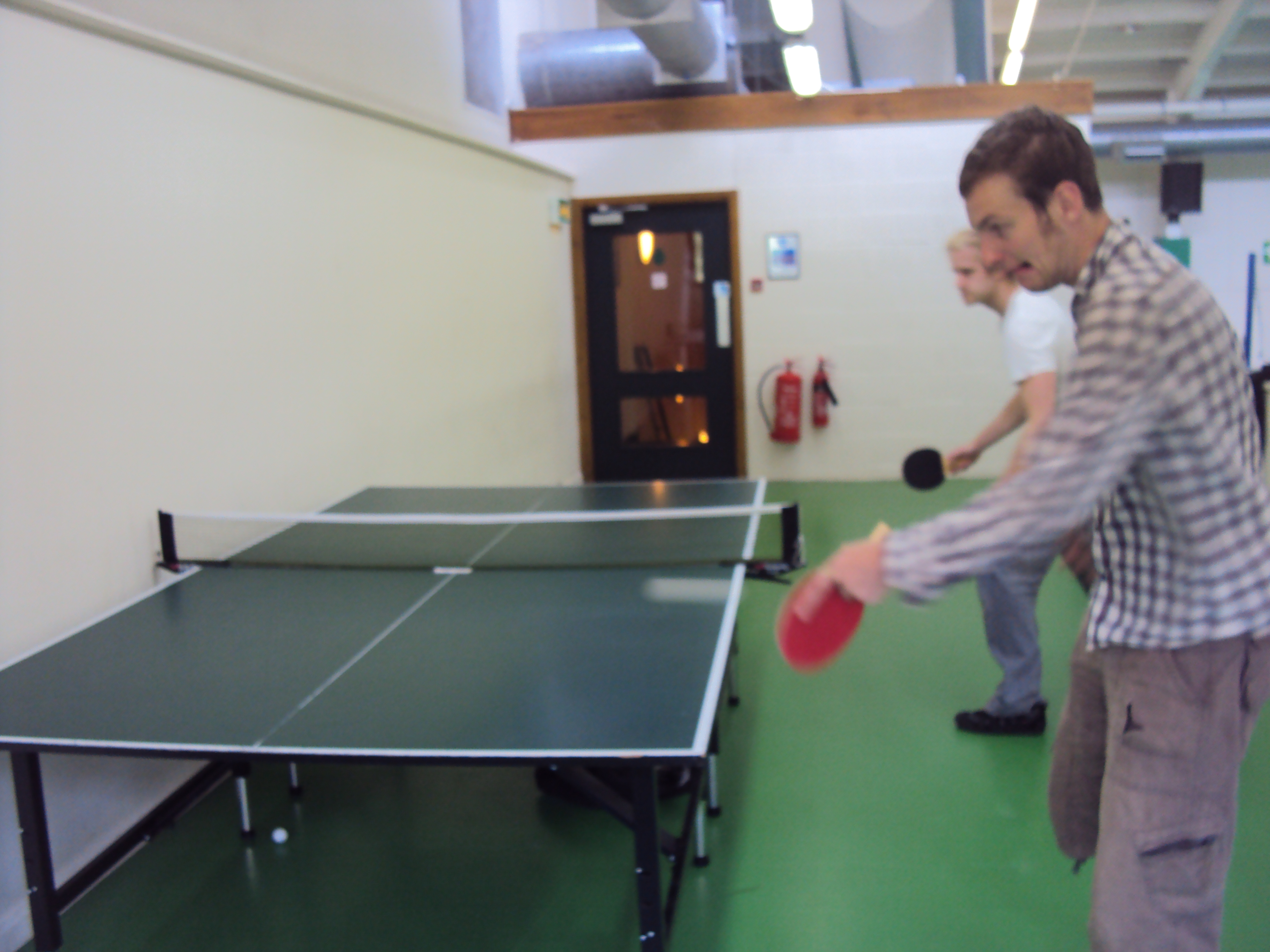
Example of Table Squash mid game

Play begins by playing for serve. The ball is bounced off one player's side of the table, off the wall, off the opposing player's side of the table. The opposing player should then strike the ball so that it bounces straight off the wall and back onto the serving player's side of the table. The server continues and strikes the ball again directly off the wall onto the opponent's side of the table, after this point the point can be won.

=== Winning the point ===
A point is won when the ball does not complete the required sequence of bouncing off the wall and the opponent's side of the table. Once this process is completed the turn passes to the opponent. Whosever turn it is upon a point not being completed, either by the ball striking the floor, the table on the wrong side of the net or in the wrong order will lose the point. A turn is not completed if the ball falls down the crack, and the player who played the stroke will lose the point.

=== Serving ===
To serve a player should play the ball off their own side of the table, followed by the wall, followed by the opponent's side of the table. Play then continues as normal. The point can be won directly off the serve if the ball is not returned. If the ball touches the net but still completes the required bounces in order a let is called and the serve is replayed. If the required order of bounces is not completed the point is lost by the server.

=== Scoring ===
A player can only score on his own serve, if a player wins the point against the serve they will then take the serve but not score a point. The server is always the player who won the previous point. Games are played as the first to eleven, but in order to win a player must win by 2 points or more, if this is not the case on reaching 11 points, play will continue until one player has a two point lead, this player is the winner of the game. When one player reaches 6 points players should swap sides and continue play, unless an agreement is reached beforehand to remain on the same side throughout the game.

=== Fouls ===
If a player steps on the floor over the imaginary line extending from the net, a foul is called and the offending player loses the point. If a player interferes with another player's shot by reaching over the imaginary line a foul is also called.

== Alternate rules ==
There are several variations on the official rules that are frequently played, major examples of these include;

=== Quick matches ===
Matches are played as first to 5, a format often used to complete mini-tournaments where many matches need to be played.

=== The old rules ===
A term relating to the origins of the game when rules were less defined. In this version of the game, a point is not over until the ball strikes the floor, comes to a complete halt or hits a player's racket twice without hitting anything else. This allows players to make multiple hits and allows for longer and more complex rallies, which may feature playing the ball off other obstacles. When playing these rules a judgmental element is included for poor sportsmanship. If a player endeavours to play repeated shots in order to set up a winning shot, such as repeated hits off the wall whilst positioning themselves in a place to slam the ball in an unreturnable manner, then poor sportsmanship is called and this player forfeits the point.

=== Surfaces ===
Due to the nature of courts being dependent on available conditions, and funding problems preventing any official table squash courts from being purpose built, there are often different features around the court that may influence play. The rules regarding these features should be agreed before commencing play. For example, there may be additional walls around the table or a roof in position, typically these surfaces can be played off without a point ending as long as the correct sequence of playing off the scoring wall (the wall perpendicular to the net than the table is placed against) and the opponent's side of the net is completed also. If the scoring wall has obstacles on it decision should be made before commencing play whether striking these should constitute a foul. Under official rules, all attempts to minimize such obstacles should be made but striking them should not constitute a foul.

=== Non regulation tables ===
The game can be played on any available rectangular table on which a net may be affixed, gameplay can be altered by using different size tables which alter the available space in which to hit the ball.

Alternatively, a two-piece table can be folded into a right angle. With the net secured to the edge of the horizontal surface and allowing a small gap between the vertical surface. The game then commences making use of the tables centre line as the delineator for points and serves and continues using the regular table squash rules.

== Governance ==
The game was founded and the rules created by the International Table Squash Association (ITSA) which continues to develop the game and create tournaments as well as recognize and ratify non ITSA organised tournaments.

== World Championships ==
The ITSA World Table Squash Championships are held every 4 years. The format of the championship is a round robin league with matches held between all participants, with the top 4 going on to the playoffs to contest the ITSA Cup. The inaugural championship was held in 2010 in Leeds.

=== Results ===
- 2014 - World Champion : Dan Brennan
- 2010 - World Champion : Mark Summers

== See also ==
- Squash racquets
- Squash tennis
- Volley squash
