= Ring-goal =

Ring-goal, a sport for two persons played on a ground, or indoor rink, 78 ft (24 m) long by 10 ft (3.0 m) wide, with a ring of split cane about 7.5 in. in diameter and weighing about 3.5 oz., which is propelled in the air by means of two sticks, resembling miniature billiard-cues, which are held inside the ring. The goals consist of two uprights 8 ft (2.4 m). high and 10 ft (3.0 m). apart, from which a net is stretched on an incline, so that its base will be a few feet behind the goal-line, and the object of the game is to drive the ring into these goals, each goal made scoring one point. The ring must be propelled by the server and caught by his opponent, on one or both of his sticks, if he can, and so returned alternately, and a point is scored for either player if it be stopped by his opponent in any other manner. A point is also scored for the receiver if the server, who begins the game, throw the ring so that it falls to the ground before the receiver can catch it between the creases, which are lines drawn across the court 6 ft (1.8 m). from the goal-lines, or the ring be driven out of court. Eleven points constitute a game.

Ring-goal was invented by an undergraduate of Keble College, Oxford in about 1885, and was played at Oxford, but without attracting wide popularity.
