= Cnapan =

Medieval football game in Wales

Cnapan (ke-nap`-ân, formerly spelled as criapan, knapan or knappan) is a form of medieval football and native Welsh sport said to have originated in the British Iron Age and remaining popular until the mid-nineteenth century. The sport declined during the Industrial Revolution in Wales, which impacted both traditionally rural Welsh pursuits such as cnapan and saw the rise of a new urban and industrial culture which would in turn lead to the rise of Rugby union in Wales. A number of attempts to revive the sport have been made since the 1980s.

The game is noted for its violence, as well as being exceptionally egalitarian and inclusive, seeing players from different social strata compete together and allowing women to compete with men. The game is also cited as an antecedent of modern football, especially Rugby Union.

== History ==
=== Ancient origins ===
The word "cnappan" originally referred to the wooden ball used in the game, with the game itself sometimes referred to as "Chwarau Cnappan" (English: Playing Cnappan). Sport historians have recognised the similarities between cnapan and the concurrent sports of Cornish hurling and La soule played in Cornwall, Brittany, Normandy and Picardy. Accounts of La soule as played in Brittany during the mid-fifteenth century describe a very similar sport to cnapan. The sport was also described as dangerous with teams consisted of large groups of men, often from rival parishes. Games were played on the Mid-Lent, or Shrovetide festival day, and oftentimes Easter or Christmas Day. As such it seems possible that all three sports are descendants of a more ancient sport played by the Celtic Britons.

Ball-games are found in Medieval Welsh literature, Welsh poetry, Welsh mythology and Arthurian literature and the earliest documented ball game in Great Britain comes from Wales. The Historia Brittonum (The History of the Britons) (829-30AD), substantiates that group ball games such as cnapan were played in 9th century Wales, understood by a wide audience and is the first text to state that such games originate with the Ancient Britons. The text itself is part of the story on how Emrys Wledig (in the Historia but Geoffrey of Monmouth later names him as Merlin) is located by the knights of king Vortigern. Looking for the boy, the knights stumble upon a seemingly very familiar scene:

After having inquired in all the provinces, they came to the field of Aelecti, in the district of Glevesing, where a party of boys were playing at ball.

Although the Latin text, (pilae ludum faciebant) does not explicitly mention Cnapan or describe the sport, it is thought to be the first reference to a game of football in Britain.

=== Tudor era ===
The game was first recorded and described during the Tudor era, a time when the Laws in Wales Acts (1535 and 1542) had removed historic Welsh institutions and barred Welsh people (or English people with Welsh connections) from positions of authority. The era also saw major restrictions imposed on public gatherings in Wales and sports were banned by order of the English Crown. Cnapan was a particular concern as it was viewed as part of a foreign identity, with the inherent aggression of the sport seen as auspicious of another rebellion against English rule. Fear of another Welsh uprising was prevalent even before the Tudor era and there were provisions enabling the King to enact emergency legislation to deal with any perceived threat from Wales. Henry VIII had strengthened prohibitions against "unlawful games" in 1541, no specific legislation was brought against cnapan, although it has been suggested that a specific ban on the sport would have been implemented had he not died a few years later. However unlike in English sports, authorities viewed cnapan as a display of the inherent barbarism of the Welsh people and prosecutions were brought against the playing of the sport itself, and criminal prosecutions were brought against cnapan players, each time on charges of rioting or riotous assembly.

As such it is difficult to determine which riot charges relate specifically to cnapan. However, a number of indictments for "diverse trespasses, riots and contempts" brought in Abergavenny and Usk over a two-month period in 1576 are almost certainly prosecutions for playing cnapan or a similar game. Each indictment was brought against fifteen to twenty men of various occupations and social status. A remarkably similar charge of "unlawful assemblies, assaults and forcible entries upon meadows, wood and pasture" was brought against David Howell and David Owen and many "unnamed others" following a cnapan game that was played through the village of Llandebie in 1582, with more charges of riotous assembly brought against groups in Carmarthenshire and Pembrokeshire in 1591 and 1604.

There are further records of the English authorities making three separate attempts to end the sport between 1598 and 1604, and it is probable that there were many more. As a result of these changes, the surviving folk-pursuits like cnapan gained a unique cultural significance for ordinary people and came to be seen as an expression of Welsh identity. The sport continued and even appeared in English in 1557, when marginalia written by Thomas Phaer in an English translation of the Aeneid. Moved by the similarities he recognised between cnapan and an ancient game described by Virgil, Phaer wrote "This play is used in Wales and is called 'Knappan'". Cnapan was even referenced with pride during the turmoil surrounding the Spanish Armada in 1588, with one observer remarking "I could wish the Spaniards were here to see our play; certes, they would be in boldily fear of our war."

=== Seventeenth, eighteenth and nineteenth centuries ===
It is clear that these prosecutions gravely effected the game's popularity, and records of matches had decreased by the start of the seventeenth century when George Owen of Henllys made a unique record of a game in the Description of Pembrokeshire. Owen's account describes a game that had become “rare to hear,” except for the “standing Knappans” which were held on the largest festival days. Owen is known to have played the sport he calls "Knappan", writing that he had “often felt the smart” of the game, and is said to have been badly injured in a match around eight years before his description. Owen was therefore well acquainted with both the game's war-like aspects and the stories of its great antiquity and would state that the game was a "genuine relic of Celtic times and manners" and that it had originated with the ancient Britons who designed the game as part of an array of sports (including wrestling and foot races) intended to maintain and exercise the physical attributes needed for warfare. In terms of Pembrokeshire, Owen notes that five festival days were traditionally set aside for games of cnapan:

Tradition date	Teams		Starting location
Shrove Tuesday	Newport	Nevern	Bury sands
Easter Monday	Meline	Eglwyswrw	Portheinon
Easterday	Penbedw	Penrhydd	Pwll-du in Penbedw
Ascension Day	Cemais	Emlyn	St. Meigans in Cemais
Feast of Corpus Christi	Cemais	Emlyn	St. Meigans in Cemais

The first three annual fixtures are contests between parishes, while the final two are between Cantrefi and Owen states that these were the greatest of the annual fixtures, with as many as two thousand players on foot and many more on horseback.

Welsh clergyman and historian, Theophilus Evans (1693–1767), tells of a game similar to cnapan being played on the banks of the River Teifi; the ancient boundary between the counties of Ceredigion and Carmarthenshire, southwest Wales. Leaving aside the gentry on horseback, there were certainly two groups of players on each side, some who grappled for the cnapan (ball) and others who were the fastest and most elusive runners. There were also features approximating to scrummages and line-outs. The game died out in the nineteenth century, as the codified game of rugby union became popular.

In Ceredigion, a game of Cnapan was played on Calan Hen well into the nineteenth century. The match kicked off at midday, at a place equally distant from the two goals which were the porches of the ancient church at Llandysul and St Gwenog's Church in Llanwenog, and the objective was to place the ball inside the other parish's church porch before sunset. Players were on foot or on horseback and the use of sticks was permitted. By 1833, the rough nature of these annual games moved the vicar of Llandysul, Rev. Enoch James to schedule his own, more sedate celebrations for Calen Hen, a gathering in Llandysul of all the Sunday Schools within eight miles of the church to answer catechisms, sing anthems and recite scriptures. These alternative celebrations at Llandysul still continue today.

=== Decline and revivals ===
By 1914 St Mary's Church in Haverfordwest had sustained significant damage due to centuries of the church door being used as a goal for cnapan games.

Cnapan has been cited as a possible antecedent of modern codes of football especially Rugby Union. In the 19th century, Rugby became increasingly popular across Wales, especially in the rapidly expanding industrial towns. As such, interest in ancient Welsh sports such as Cnapan decline. The sport had also done notable damage to a number of churches used as goals and players once again found themselves falling foul of English laws. The cnapan match held at Laugharne on Shrove Tuesday 1838 resulted in two "ringleaders" being identified and brought to court. Another Shrove Tuesday match held on the "principal thoroughfare" at Neath in 1884 may well have been the last instance of a true cnapan match in its original form. The game again caused consternation for the townsfolk, with preparations for the game lasting months and local children being actively discouraged from spectating.

Despite this, the game was fondly remembered as a forerunner to Welsh rugby well into the twentieth century. An article entitled "From Knappin to Rugby" appeared in the Prisoner of War magazine "Cymro", written for the entertainment of Welsh POWs at Stalag IV-B near Mühlberg in May 1944.

A modern cnapan contest between Newport and Nevern was reenacted in 1985 with modified rules, a leather ball instead of the traditional wooden ball and a referee to keep order. The games allowed for teams of any size, with new players able to join the action at any point. MP for Ceredigion and Pembroke North, Geraint Howells threw in the first ball of the game. The game continued as an annual fixture for a decade, until the tournament was discontinued by the organisers due to the inability to obtain insurance coverage for the players.

In 1990 a Cnapan International match was held between England and Wales at the Gateshead Garden Festival, with Wales winning the match easily, partly because the English team did not know the rules. Another cnapan game was organised in 2012 on Traeth Mawr for the BBC programme Britain's Lost Routes with Griff Rhys Jones, as part of the programme's look at the culture along the old pilgrim route from Aberystwyth to St Davids. In 2024, the Welsh republican and socialist organisation, the Welsh Underground Network revived the game as part of their annual congress.

== Gameplay and similarities to rugby ==
The porches of the ancient church at Llandysul (left) and St Gwenog's Church, Llanwenog (right) were designated as the goals during annual cnapan games between the two parishes

George Owen of Henllys stated that the "cnapan" itself was a wooden ball made from "massy wood" (box, yew, crab or holly tree) and large enough to be held in a man's hand. The cnapan was prepared by the "foot company" who made it slippery and hard to carry through soaking or boiling it in oil or animal fat for at least 12 hours (usually overnight). The game would commence when a member of this company threw the cnapan upright into the air so that either of the competing teams may catch it, while players would cry out "Cadw ôl!" (English: Look well!). The cnapan could be passed, smuggled or thrown across the considerable distances involved in each game. The players would also sing traditional Welsh songs as the game was played.

Teams consisted of a large group of players (sometimes up to a thousand or fifteen hundred) from neighbouring parishes or Cantrefi. In contrast with English sports of the period, cnapan games involved people from across the community, regardless of social or economic standing. Labourers and peasants played the game on foot, but members of the gentry often played on horseback, this was a great advantage as a horseman could carry the cnapan over greater distances and at greater speed. However, should an opposition player capture the horseman the rider was often beaten down with sticks and clubs until the cnapan was released. Horseman were allowed to use sticks or cudgels, these weapons were measured with a sizing ring before play to ensure that each weapon was small enough to "harm, but not mightily hurt" a competitor. Reports suggest that games were also open to female players as late as the early nineteenth century. A match between the parishes of Gelland and Pencarreg was said to involve all the population, "rich and poor, male and female" with female players discarding their gowns, and "sometimes their petticoats".

As in modern codes of Rugby football, each team could be subdivided into two groups, "sturdy gamesmen" (equivalent to a pack of forwards in modern rugby) and others who were more elusive and quicker (equivalent to a rugby backline). The game also featured facets of play similar to the scrums and line-outs found in modern rugby. The cnapan would often become lodged in an extended and chaotic melee (similar to a rugby scrum). However, these melees were often little more than huge fights between as many as five hundred people, in which the game ceased to progress and severe injuries or even deaths occurred. As such, the game could be stopped at any time by a player shouting the word "Heddwch!" (English: Peace) which would result in a cessation of brutalities and a restart of the gameplay. The game would then be restarted with the cnapan again being thrown high into the air so that both teams could compete, in something resembling the rugby union line-out.

Gameplay was not just an exercise in strength, speed and skill. One account noted that a weaker side had managed to keep hold of the cnapan by tightly clasping it between two players, while about a hundred of their teammates clustered around them, grasping one another and preventing their more numerous opponents from breaking through.

"All first strip bare saving a light pair of breeches, bare-headed, bare-bodied, bare legs and feet: for if he leave but his shirt on his back in the fury of the game, it is most commonly torn to pieces and I have also seen some long-lock gallants, trimly trimmed at this game not by clipping but by pulling their hair and beards."

— George Owen of Henllys, 1603

The stated objective of the game was to take the cnapan to the "goal" (often the church of one's home parish) before sunset. However, the game was often called when it became clear that there was not enough time left for the losing team to return the cnapan before nightfall. While the game itself would see numerous participants return home with severe wounds, head injuries and broken bones, the end of play would see players from competing teams come together in good humour. No grudge or ill-feelings seemed to exist after the game had ended, with players telling their opponents in jest that they would repay them for their injuries at the next match.

Both George Owen and Thomas Phaer noted the absence of any reward or prize money for the winning team, with Owen stating that they compete "only for glory and renown, first for the fame of their country in general, next every particular to win praise for his activity and prowess."

== Similar sports ==
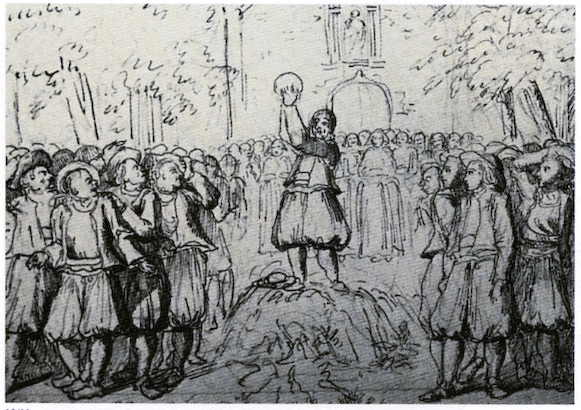
An 1844 depiction of a game of La soule in Brittany, the sport has many similarities to cnapan and is also said to descend from the sports of the ancient Britons

Aside from the La soule games found in Brittany, Normandy and Cornwall. Similar sports to Cnapan exist across Celtic Britain, these include the sports of "Ba'" in Scotland and "Uppies and Downies" in Cumbria. Within Welsh sport, a number of other games were played across Wales that resembled cnapan in some way. Bando, was a Welsh team sport also played between rival parishes with "immense vigor and not a little violence", however by the eighteenth century the sport was characterised by the use of curve-ended stick resembling modern hockey sticks and the sport is now more commonly grouped with the Celtic sports of hurling and shinty.

Cnapan has also been compared to a number of folk-sports in England. The game of "camping" is found across East Anglia but appears to be related, with an area of land in Needham Market, Suffolk named as the "Camping Land". The Haxey Hood is a comparable cultural event held at Haxey, North Lincolnshire. The gameplay involves pushing a leather tube (the "hood") to one of four pubs in the town (the goals), and also involves a large melee (the "sway") which has been compared to a rugby scrum.

== "Cnapan" in modern culture ==
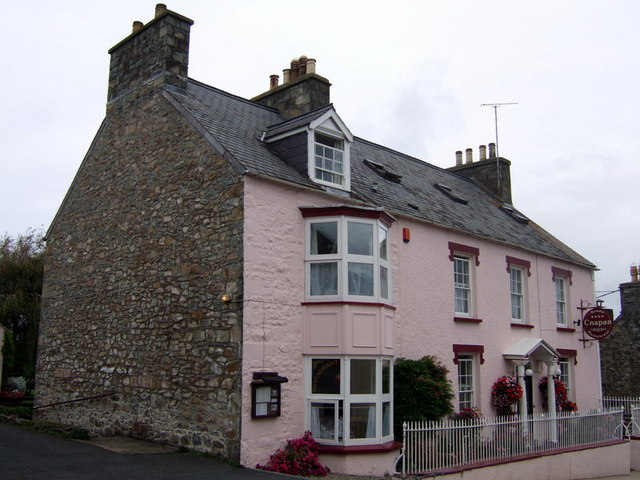
The Cnapan Country House, a Grade II listed building in Newport, Pembrokeshire is named for the sport

The legacy of the sport can be seen across West Wales. In Pembrokeshire, the "Cnapan Hotel" remains a feature of the town of Newport, Pembrokeshire and The "Tlws Twrnament Cnapan" (English: The Cnapan Tournament Trophy) is displayed at a local museum.

=== Gŵyl Werin y Cnapan ===
A number of music festivals have taken the name "cnapan" in recent years, the Gŵyl Werin y Cnapan (English: The Cnapan Folk Festival), is a festival celebrating traditional Celtic music, the Welsh language and Welsh art. The first festival was held in 1985, with the folk musician, Dafydd Iwan playing a key role in its founding.

The festival grew quickly and was soon moved from its initial location at the leisure centre in Drefach Felindre, to an open air event held at Ffostrasol. By 1988 the festival had grown into a major cultural event, with international acts from Brittany, Chile and most notably, the band De Dannan from Ireland as well twmpath dances, Welsh Rock bands and academic lectures. The festival was once again headlined by Dafydd Iwan with the band Ar Log.

The success of the Gŵyl Werin y Cnapan leading to the establishment of a spin-off festival named Roc y Cnapan (English: The Cnapan Rock) in the early 1990s. Both festivals continued to grow throughout the decade becoming one of Wales's major music events, with Iwan describing it as "the highlight of the year". During the era of Cool Cymru, the Rock music event attracted popular Welsh bands such as Datblygu, Gorky's Zygotic Mynci and Catatonia. While the folk version hosted The Fureys, De Dannan and The Dubliners.

However, these first annual festivals came to an end in 2002 due to the rising costs for the amateur organisers, stating that the festivals had "grown too big." A new version of the festivals was revived by a local businessman in Easter 2013, with Dafydd Iwan returning to headline the festival once again at Croeslan.
