= Medieval football =

Football game played in Europe

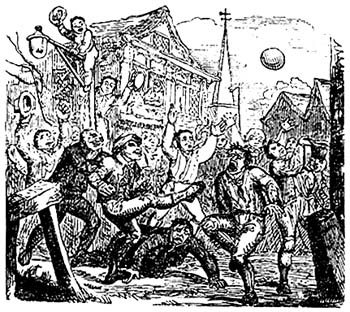
A 1721 illustration of so-called "mob football", a variety of medieval football

Medieval football is a modern term used for a wide variety of the localised informal football games that were invented and played in Europe during the Middle Ages. Alternative names include folk football, mob football and Shrovetide football. These games may be regarded as the ancestors of modern codes of football, and by comparison with later forms of football, the medieval matches had few rules and were chaotic.

The Middle Ages saw a rise in popularity of games played annually at Shrovetide (before Lent) throughout England, particularly in London. The games played in England at this time may have arrived with the Romans but there is little evidence to indicate this. Certainly the Romans played ball games, in particular harpastum. There is also one reference to ball games being played in southern Britain prior to the Norman Conquest. In the ninth century Nennius's Historia Brittonum tells that a group of boys were playing at ball (pilae ludus). The origin of this account is either Southern England or Wales. References to a ball game played in northern France known as La Soule or Choule, in which the ball was propelled by hands, feet, and sticks, date from the 12th century.

These archaic forms of football, typically classified as mob football, would be played in towns and villages, involving an unlimited number of players on opposing teams, who would clash in a heaving mass of people struggling to drag an inflated pig's bladder by any means possible to markers at each end of a town. By some accounts, in some such events any means could be used to move the ball towards the goal, as long as it did not lead to manslaughter or murder. These games were also played in the Australian colonies.

These antiquated games went into sharp decline in the 19th century when the Highway Act 1835 was passed banning the playing of football on public highways. In spite of this, games continued to be played in some parts of the United Kingdom and still survive in a number of towns, notably the Ba game played at Christmas and New Year at Kirkwall in the Orkney Islands of Scotland, Hand Ba’ on the second Friday after the first Tuesday in February in Jedburgh, Scottish Borders. Uppies and Downies over Easter at Workington in Cumbria, the Royal Shrovetide Football Match on Shrove Tuesday and Ash Wednesday at Ashbourne in Derbyshire, England, and the Atherstone Ball Game played on Shrove Tuesday since 1199 in Atherstone, Warwickshire

Few images of medieval football survive. One wooden misericord carving (see image) from the early fourteenth century at Gloucester Cathedral, England, clearly shows two young men running vigorously towards each other with a ball in mid-air between them. There is a hint that the players may be using their hands to strike the ball. A second medieval image in the British Museum, London clearly shows a group of men with a large ball on the ground. The ball clearly has a seam where leather has been sewn together. It is unclear exactly what is happening in this set of three images, although the last image appears to show a man with a broken arm. It is likely that this image highlights the dangers of some medieval football games.

Most of the very early references to the game speak simply of "ball play" or "playing at ball". This reinforces the idea that the games played at the time did not necessarily involve a ball being kicked.

== History ==
The earliest reference to ball games in post-classical Europe comes from the eighth-century English historian Bede, who refers to a "playing ball" ("pila ludicra") in his work De Temporum Ratione. Another early reference comes from the ninth-century Historia Brittonum, attributed to the Welsh monk Nennius. The text, written in Wales, mentions a group of boys "playing at ball" ('pilae ludus').

The earliest reference from France which provides evidence of the playing of ball games (presumably La soule) comes in 1147. This refers to the handing over of "seven balloons of greatest dimension". An early description of ball games that are likely to be football in England was given by William Fitzstephen in his Descriptio Nobilissimi Civitatis Londoniae (c. 1174 – 1183). He described the activities of London youths during the annual festival of Shrove Tuesday:

After lunch, all the youth of the city go out into the fields to take part in a ball game. The students of each school have their own ball; the workers from each city craft are also carrying their balls. Older citizens, fathers, and wealthy citizens come on horseback to watch their juniors competing, and to relive their own youth vicariously: you can see their inner passions aroused as they watch the action and get caught up in the fun being had by the carefree adolescents.

The earliest confirmation that such ball games in England involved kicking comes from a verse about Little Saint Hugh of Lincoln. This was probably written in the thirteenth century, being recorded by Matthew Paris, although the precise date is not known: "Four and twenty bonny boys, were playing at the ball.. he kicked the ball with his right foot".

In about 1200, "ball" is mentioned as one of the games played by King Arthur's knights in Brut, written by Layamon, an English poet from Worcestershire. This is the earliest reference to the English language "ball". Layamon states: "some drive balls (balles) far over the fields". Records from 1280 report on a game at Ulgham, near Ashington in Northumberland, in which a player was killed as a result of running against an opposing player's dagger. This account is noteworthy because it is the earliest reference to an English ball game that definitely involved kicking; this suggests that kicking was involved in even earlier ball games in England. In Cornwall in 1283 plea rolls No. 111 mention a man named Roger who was accused of striking a fellow player in a game of soule with a stone, a blow which proved fatal.

=== 14th century ===
The earliest reference to ball games being played by university students comes in 1303 when "Thomas of Salisbury, a student of Oxford University, found his brother Adam dead, and it was alleged that he was killed by Irish students, whilst playing the ball in the High Street towards Eastgate".

In 1314, comes the earliest reference to a game called football when Nicholas de Farndone, Lord Mayor of the City of London issued a decree on behalf of King Edward II banning football. It was written in the French used by the English upper classes at the time. A translation reads: "[f]orasmuch as there is great noise in the city caused by hustling over large foot balls [rageries de grosses pelotes de pee] in the fields of the public from which many evils might arise which God forbid: we command and forbid on behalf of the king, on pain of imprisonment, such game to be used in the city in the future."

Another early account of kicking ball games from England comes in a 1321 dispensation, granted by Pope John XXII to William de Spalding of Shouldham in Norfolk:

To William de Spalding, canon of Scoldham of the order of Sempringham. During the game at ball as he kicked the ball, a lay friend of his, also called William, ran against him and wounded himself on a sheathed knife carried by the canon, so severely that he died within six days. Dispensation is granted, as no blame is attached to William de Spalding, who, feeling deeply the death of his friend, and fearing what might be said by his enemies, has applied to the pope.

Banning of ball games began in France in 1331 by Philip VI, presumably the ball game known as La soule.

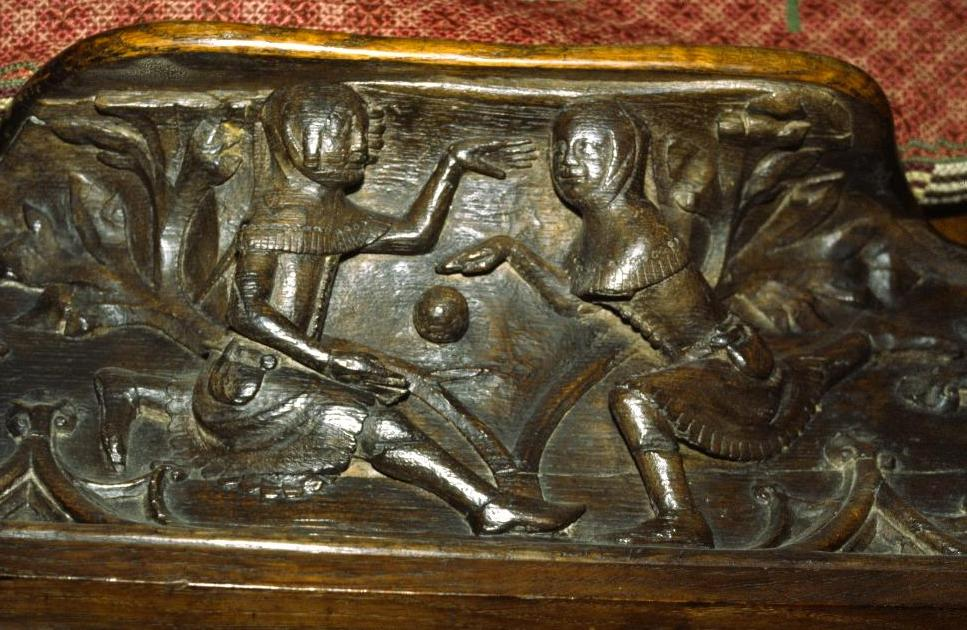
Youths playing ball, carved on a misericord c. 1350 at Gloucester Cathedral.

In the mid-fourteenth century a misericord (a carved wooden seat-rest) at Gloucester Cathedral, England shows two young men playing a ball game. It looks as though they are using their hands for the game; however, kicking certainly cannot be excluded. Most other medieval images of ball games in England show large balls. This picture clearly shows that small balls were also used.

King Edward III of England also issued such a declaration, in 1363: "[m]oreover we ordain that you prohibit under penalty of imprisonment all and sundry from such stone, wood and iron throwing; handball, football, or hockey; coursing and cock-fighting, or other such idle games". At this time football was already being differentiated in England from handball, which suggests the evolution of basic rules. Between 1314 and 1667, football was officially banned in England alone by more than 30 royal and local laws.

Likewise the poet Geoffrey Chaucer offered an allusion to the manner in which contemporary ball games may have been played in fourteenth-century England. In Part IV of The Knight's Tale, the first of the Canterbury Tales (written some time after 1380), he uses the following line: "He rolleth under foot as doth a ball".

The English theologian John Wycliffe (1320–1384) referred to football in one of his sermons: "and now þei clouten þer shone wiþ censuris, as who shulde chulle a foot-balle". It may be the earliest use of the word football in English.

=== 15th century ===
That football was known at the turn of the century in Western England comes from about 1400 when the West Midland Laud Troy Book states in English: "Hedes reled aboute overal As men playe at the fote-ball".

Two references to football games come from Sussex in 1403 and 1404 at Selmeston and Chidham as part of baptisms. On each occasion one of the players broke his leg.

King Henry IV of England provides an early documented use of the English word "football" when in 1409 he issued a proclamation forbidding the levying of money for "foteball".

On 4 March 1409, eight men were compelled to give a bond of £20 to the London city chamberlain for their good behaviour towards "the kind and good men of the mystery of Cordwainers", undertaking not to collect money for a football ('pro pila pedali').

In 1410, King Henry IV of England found it necessary to impose a fine of 20 shillings on mayors and bailiffs in towns where misdemeanours such as football occurred. This confirms that football was not confined to London.

The Accounts of the Worshipful Company of Brewers between 1421 and 1423 concerning the hiring out of their hall include reference to "by the "footeballepleyers" twice... 20 pence" listed in English under the title "crafts and fraternities". This reference suggests that bans against football were unsuccessful and the listing of football players as a "fraternity" is the earliest allusion to what might be considered a football club.

The earliest reference to football or kicking ball games in Scotland was in 1424 when King James I of Scotland also attempted to ban the playing of "fute-ball".

In 1425 the prior of Bicester, in Oxfordshire, England, made a payment on St Katherine's day "to sundry gifts to football players" ('ludentibus ad pilam pedalem') of 4 denarii. At this time the prior was willing to give his patronage to the game despite its being outlawed.

In about 1430 Thomas Lydgate refers to the form of football played in East Anglia known as Camp Ball: "Bolseryd out of length and bread, lyck a large campynge balle".

In 1440 the game of Camp Ball was confirmed to be a form of football when the first ever English-Latin dictionary, Promptorium parvulorum, offered the following definition of camp ball: "Campan, or playar at foott balle, pediluson; campyon, or champion".

In 1457 King James II of Scotland, like his father James I, also banned football and golf, viewing the games as a distraction from the mandatory archery training required of all males over age 12.

In 1472 the rector of Swaffham, Norfolk bequeathed a field adjoining the church yard for use as a "camping-close" or "camping-pightel" specifically for the playing of the East Anglian version of football known as Camp Ball.

In 1486 comes the earliest description of "a football", in the sense of a ball rather than a game. This reference is in Juliana Berners' Book of St Albans. It states: "a certain rounde instrument to play with ...it is an instrument for the foote and then it is calde in Latyn 'pila pedalis', a fotebal." It was considered socially acceptable for a football to be included in medieval English Heraldry.

On 22 April 1497, James IV of Scotland, who was at Stirling Castle paid two shillings for footballs, recorded as, "giffen [given] to Jame Dog to b[u]y fut ballis to the King". It is not known if he himself played with them.

The earliest and perhaps most important description of a football game comes from the end of the 15th century in a Latin account of a football game with features of modern soccer. It was played at Cawston in Nottinghamshire, England. It is included in a manuscript collection of the miracles of King Henry VI of England. Although the precise date is uncertain it certainly comes from between 1481 and 1500. This is the first account of an exclusively "kicking game" and the first description of dribbling: "[t]he game at which they had met for common recreation is called by some the foot-ball game. It is one in which young men, in country sport, propel a huge ball not by throwing it into the air but by striking it and rolling it along the ground, and that not with their hands but with their feet... kicking in opposite directions." The chronicler gives the earliest reference to a football field, stating that: "[t]he boundaries have been marked and the game had started." Nevertheless, the game was still rough, as the account confirms: "a game, I say, abominable enough . . . and rarely ending but with some loss, accident, or disadvantage of the players themselves."

Medieval sport had no referee.

=== 16th century ===
In 1510 comes the next description of early football by Alexander Barclay, a Clergymen from the Southeast of England:

They get the bladder and blowe it great and thin, with many beanes and peason put within, It ratleth, shineth and soundeth clere and fayre, While it is throwen and caste up in the eyre, Eche one contendeth and hath a great delite, with foote and hande the bladder for to smite, if it fall to the ground they lifte it up again... Overcometh the winter with driving the foote-ball.

The first record of a pair of football boots occurs when Henry VIII of England ordered a pair from the Great Wardrobe in 1526. The royal shopping list for footwear states: "45 velvet pairs and 1 leather pair for football". Unfortunately these are no longer in existence. It is not known for certain whether the king himself played the game, but if so this is noteworthy as his son Edward VI later banned the game in 1548 because it incited riots.

The reputation of football as a violent game persists throughout most accounts from 16th-century England. In 1531, Sir Thomas Elyot noted in his The Book of the Governor the dangers of football, as well as the benefits of archery ("shooting"):

Some men wolde say, that in mediocritie, whiche I haue so moche praised in shootynge, why shulde nat boulynge, claisshe, pynnes, and koytyng be as moche commended? Verily as for two the laste, be to be utterly abiected of al noble men, in like wise foote balle, wherin is nothinge but beastly furie and extreme violence; wherof procedeth hurte, and consequently rancour and malice do remaine with them that be wounded; wherfore it is to be put in perpetuall silence. In class she is emploied to litle strength; in boulyng oftentimes to moche; wherby the sinewes be to moche strayned, and the vaines to moche chafed. Wherof often tymes is sene to ensue ache, or the decreas of strength or agilitie in the armes: where, in shotyng, if the shooter use the strength of his bowe within his owne tiller, he shal neuer be therwith grieued or made more feble.

Although many sixteenth-century references to football are disapproving or dwell upon its dangers, there are two notable departures from this view. First, Elyot (although previously a critic of the game) advocates "footeball" as part of what he calls vehement exercise in his Castel of Helth published in 1534. Secondly English headmaster Richard Mulcaster provides in his 1581 publication Positions Wherein Those Primitive Circumstances Be Examined, Which Are Necessarie for the Training up of Children, the earliest evidence of organised, refereed football for small teams playing in formation.

The first reference to football in Ireland occurs in the Statute of Galway of 1527, which allowed the playing of football and archery but banned " 'hokie' – the hurling of a little ball with sticks or staves" as well as other sports. (The earliest recorded football match in Ireland was one between Louth and Meath, at Slane, in 1712.)

Apprentices progressing to become master craftsmen in 16th-century Perth traditionally had to pay for a banquet and hold a football match. The oldest surviving ball that might have been used for football games dates to about 1540 and comes from Scotland. It is made from leather and a pig's bladder. It was discovered in 1981 in the roof structure of the Queen's Chamber, Stirling Castle. Whilst other uses for the ball, such as the Italian game pallone, have been suggested, most notably by the National Museum of Scotland, due to its size (diameter 14–16 cm), staff at the Stirling Smith Museum and researchers at the Scottish Football Museum have attributed its use to football, citing the description of the ball used in the Carlisle Castle game of 1568.

The violence of early football in Scotland is made clear in this sixteenth-century poem on the "beauties of football":

Bruised muscles and broken bones
Discordant strife and futile blows
Lamed in old age, then cripled withal
These are the beauties of football

— Anonymous, translated from old Scots

The earliest specific reference to football (pila pedalis) at a university comes in 1555 when it was outlawed at St John's College, Oxford. Similar decrees followed shortly after at other Oxford Colleges and at Cambridge University.

Another reference occurred in 1555, when Antonio Scaino published his treatise Del Giuoco della Palla (On the Game of the Ball). It was mostly concerned with a medieval predecessor of tennis, but near the end, Scaino included a chapter titled, "Del Giuoco del Calcio" ("On the Game of Football"), for comparison. According to Scaino, the game was popular with students. It could be played with any number of players. The only rules seem to be that weapons could not be brought onto the field, and the ball could not be thrown by hand. The goal was for each team to try to cross the ball across a marked space at the opposite end of the field. To start, the ball was placed in the middle of the field and kicked by a member of the team that was chosen by lots. Scaino remarks that its chief entertainment for the spectators was to see "the players fall in great disarray & upside down."

In June 1568 Sir Francis Knollys described a football game played at Carlisle Castle, Cumbria, England by the retinue of Mary Queen of Scots: "20 of her retinue played at football before her for two hours very strongly, nimbly, and skilfully, without any foul play offered, the smallness of their ball occasioning their fair play". Mary's retinue was predominantly Scottish, made up primarily by nobles who had followed her south in the aftermath of the Battle of Langside.

The first official rules of Calcio Fiorentino (Florentine kick) were recorded in 1580, although the game had been developing around Florence for some time before that date. The game involved teams of 27 kicking and carrying a ball in a giant sandpit set up in the Piazza Santa Croce in the centre of Florence, both teams aiming for their designated point on the perimeter of the sandpit.

In 1586, men from a ship commanded by English explorer John Davis, went ashore to play a form of football with Inuit (Eskimo) people in Greenland.

=== 17th century ===
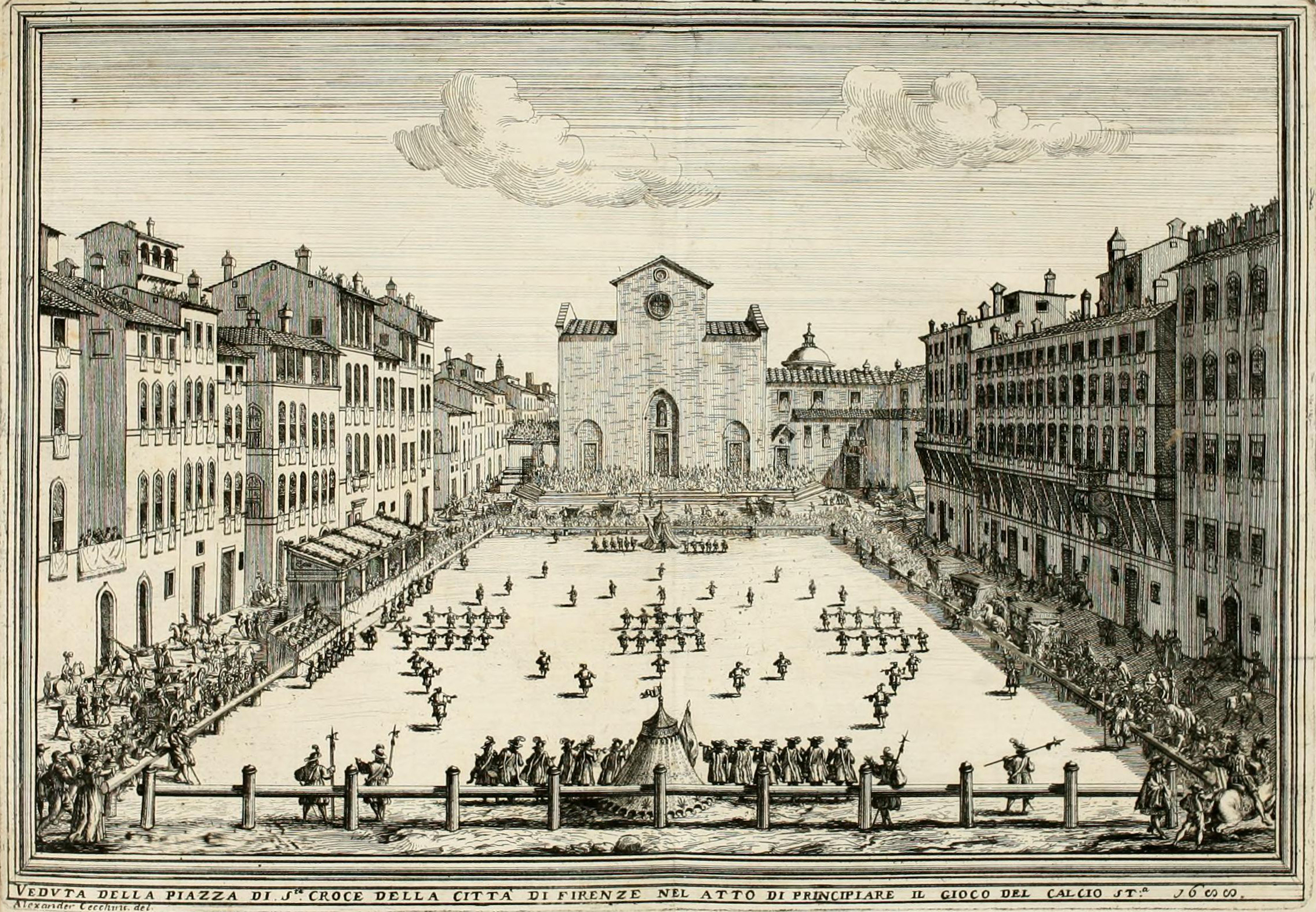
Illustration of a game of Calcio Fiorentino in Florence from 1688

In Wales, the game of cnapan was described at length by George Owen of Henllys, an eccentric historian of Pembrokeshire, in 1603:

This game... is thought to be of great antiquity and is as followeth. The ancient Britons being naturally a warlike nation did no doubt for the exercise of their youth in time of peace and to avoid idleness devise games of activity where each man might show his natural prowess and agility...... About one or two of the clock afternoon begins the play, in this sort, after a cry made both parties draw to into some plain, all first stripped bare saving a light pair of breeches, bare-headed, bare-bodied, bare legs and feet....The foot company thus meeting, there is a round ball prepared of a reasonable quantity so as a man may hold it in his hand and no more, this ball is of some massy wood as box, yew, crab or holly tree and should be boiled in tallow for make it slippery and hard to hold. This ball is called cnapan and is by one of the company hurling bolt upright into the air, and at the fall he that catches it hurls it towards the country he plays for, for goal or appointed place there is none neither needs any, for the play is not given over until the cnapan be so far carried that there is no hope to return it back that night, for the carrying of it a mile or two miles from the first place is no losing of the honour so it be still followed by the company and the play still maintained, it is oftentimes seen the chase to follow two miles and more...

The earliest account of a ball game that involves passing of the ball comes from Richard Carew's 1602 account of Cornish Hurling which states "Then must he cast the ball (named Dealing) to some one of his fellowes". Carew also offers the earliest description of a goal (they pitch two bushes in the ground, some eight or ten foote asunder; and directly against them, ten or twelue score off, other twayne in like distance, which they terme their Goales") and of goal keepers ("There is assigned for their gard, a couple of their best stopping Hurlers").

The first direct reference to scoring a goal is in John Day's play The Blind Beggar of Bethnal Green (performed circa 1600; published 1659): "I'll play a gole at camp-ball" (an extremely violent variety of football, which was popular in East Anglia). Similarly in a poem in 1613, Michael Drayton refers to "when the Ball to throw, And drive it to the Gole, in squadrons forth they goe". In 1615 James I of England visited Wiltshire and the villagers "entertained his Majesty with a foot-ball match"

Oliver Cromwell, who left Cambridge University in 1617, was described by his contemporary biographer James Heath as "one of the chief matchmakers and players of football" during his time at the university.

In 1623 Edmund Waller refers in one of his poems to "football" and alludes to teamwork and passing the ball: "They ply their feet, and still the restless ball, Toss'd to and fro, is urged by them all". In 1650 Richard Baxter gives an interesting description of football in his book The Saints' Everlasting Rest: "Alas, that I must stand by and see the Church, and Cause of Christ, like a Football in the midst of a crowd of Boys, tost about in contention from one to another.... and may drive it before him. ... But to be spurned about in the dirt, till they have driven it on to the goal of their private interests". This is noteworthy as it confirms that passing of the ball from one player to another was part of football games.

The first study of football as part of early sports is given in Francis Willughby's Book of Games, written in about 1660. This account is particularly noteworthy as he refers to football by its correct name in English and is the first to describe the following: modern goals and a pitch ("a close that has a gate at either end. The gates are called Goals"), tactics ("leaving some of their best players to guard the goal"), scoring ("they that can strike the ball through their opponents' goal first win") and the way teams were selected ("the players being equally divided according to their strength and nimbleness"). He is the first to describe a law of football: "They often break one another's shins when two meet and strike both together against the ball, and therefore there is a law that they must not strike higher than the ball". His account of the ball itself is also informative: "They blow a strong bladder and tie the neck of it as fast as they can, and then put it into the skin of a bull's cod and sew it fast in". He adds: "The harder the ball is blown, the better it flies. They used to put quicksilver into it sometimes to keep it from lying still". His book includes the first (basic) diagram illustrating a football pitch.

=== 19th century ===
In the early 19th century, Shrovetide football remained popular in England, but with growing urbanisation, concern for public order and the protection of property caused local vestries to begin to curb these events, aided by the new police forces. This process was enabled by the Highway Act 1835, which specifically proscribed "Football or any other game on any Part of the said Highway, to the annoyance of any Passenger". Accordingly, street football matches were banned in numerous towns, notably in Surrey; Richmond in 1840, East Molesey in 1857, Hampton in 1864 and Kingston upon Thames in 1867. Further north, the game at Derby was controversially suppressed from 1840. In some towns, such as Alnwick and Twickenham, dissent against these bans was diffused by the provision of an open space away from the town centre. At Nuneaton the game survived almost to the end of the century and at Dorking and Workington, Shrovetide football continued into the next.

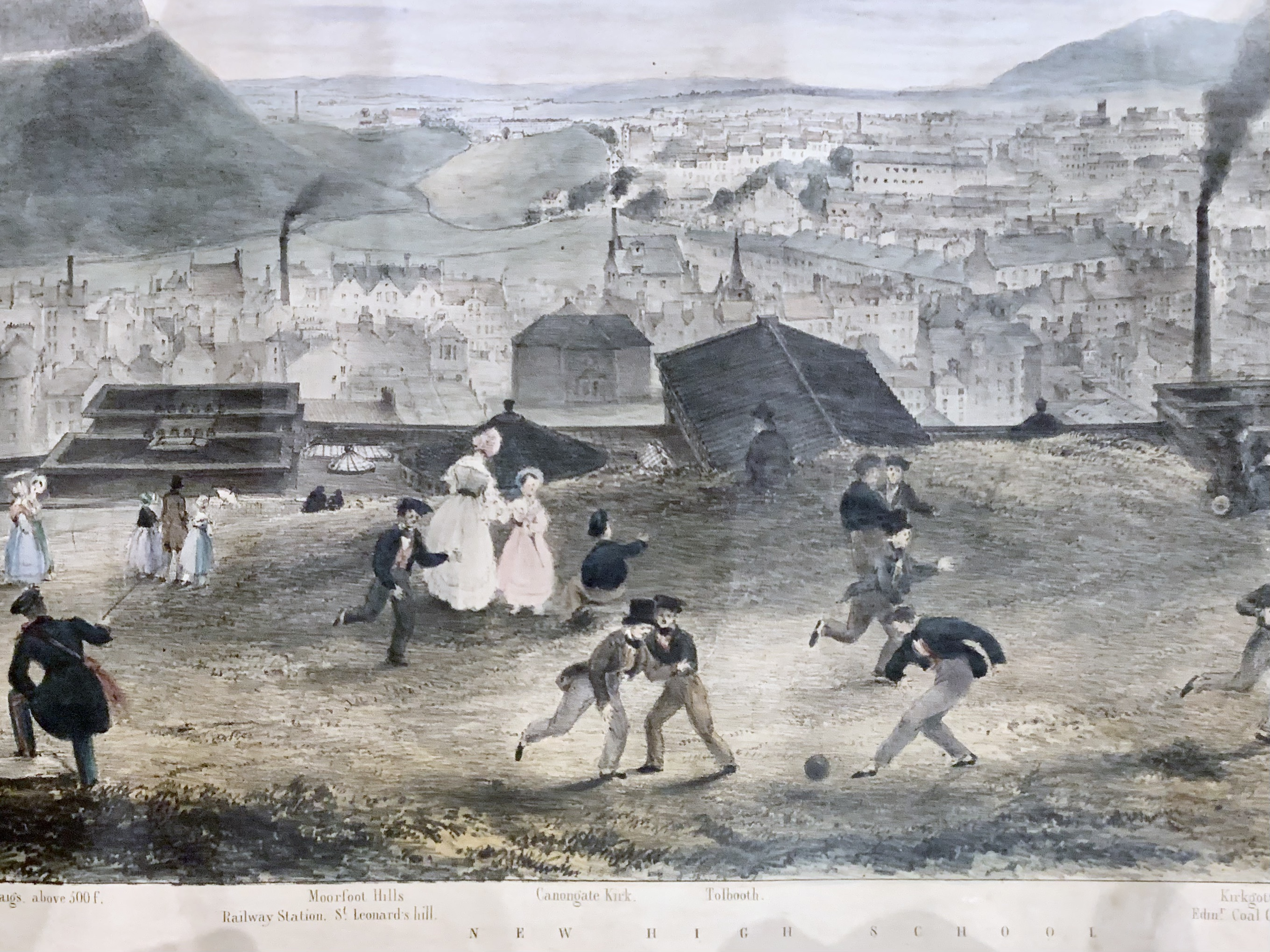
Football on Calton Hill, from Panorama of Edinburgh by Samuel Leith, c. 1840, at the Scottish National Gallery

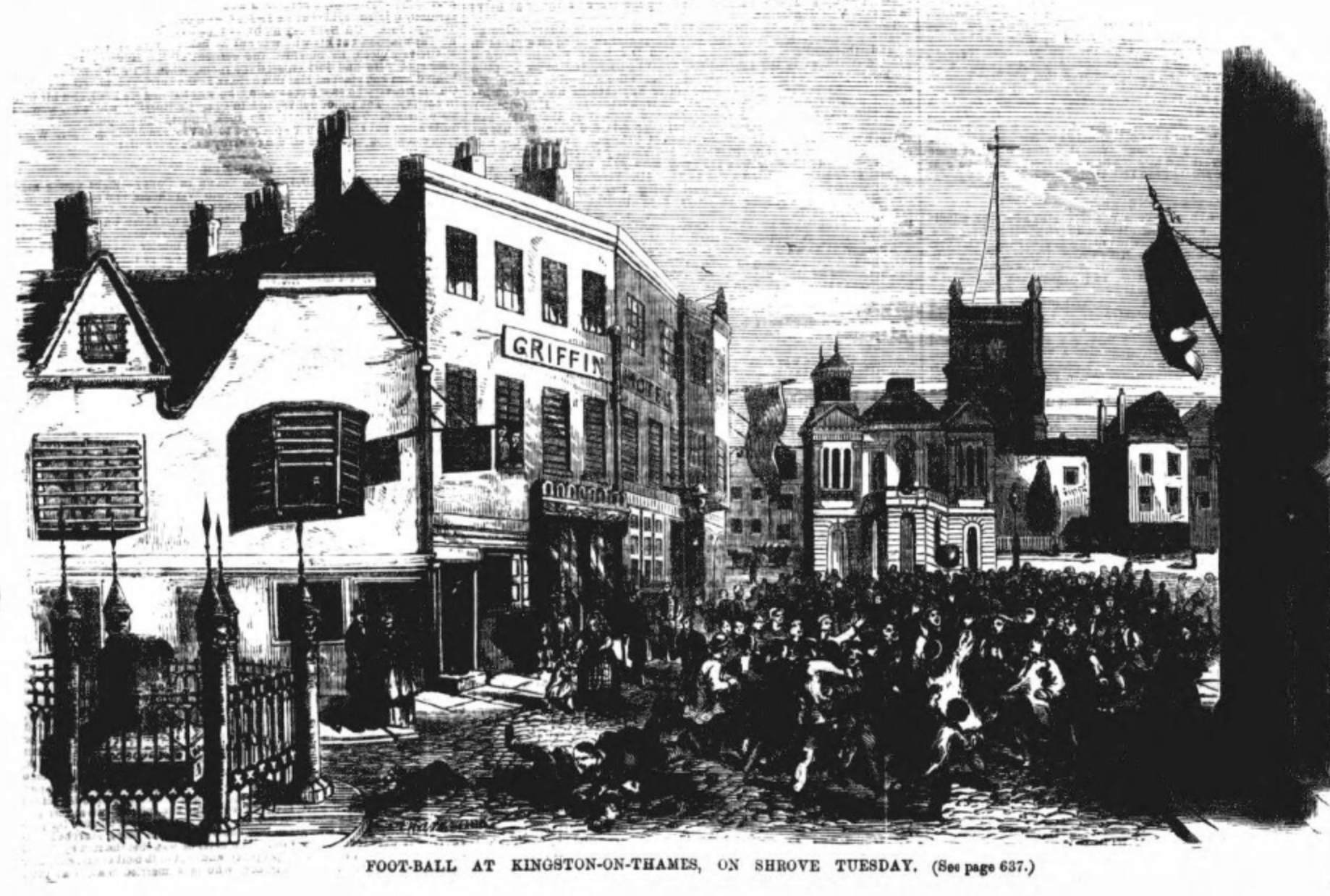
Shrove Tuesday Football in Kingston upon Thames (1865)

== Surviving medieval ball games ==
=== England ===
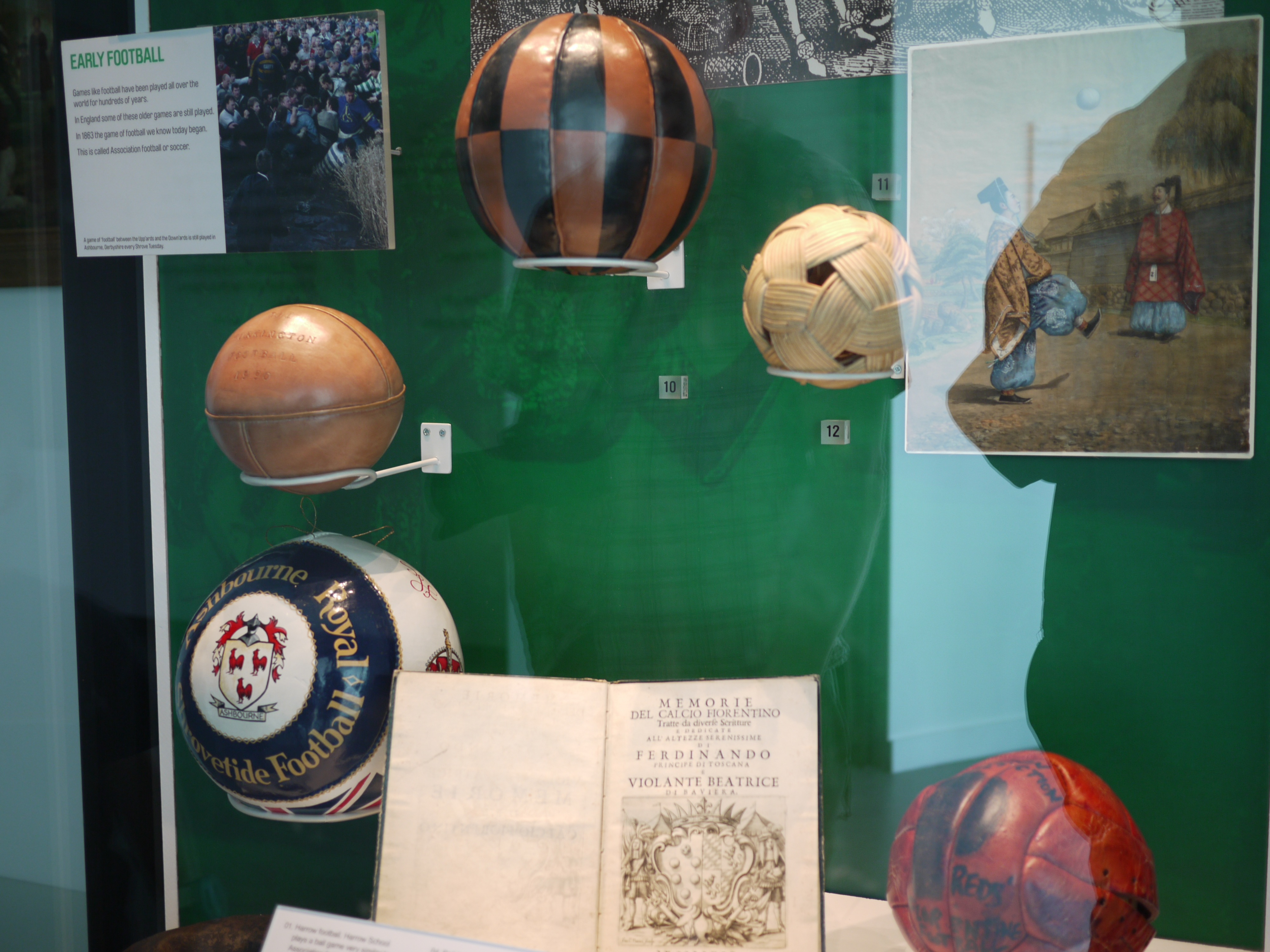
Some footballs

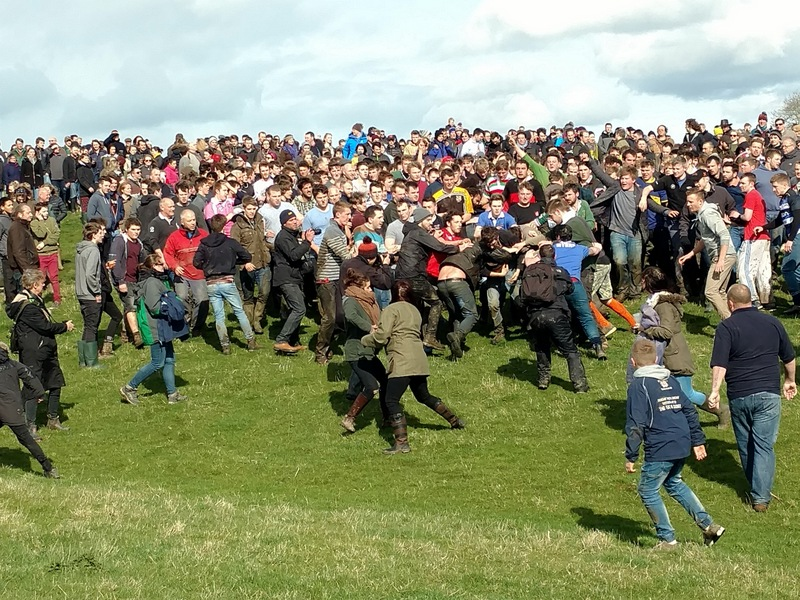
The 2016 game of 'bottle-kicking' in Hallaton, Leicestershire, actually played with three small wooden barrels. One of them can just be seen being held by a man at centre right.

- Alnwick in Northumberland: the Scoring the Hales game survives, and begins with the Duke of Northumberland dropping a ball from the battlements of Alnwick Castle.
- Ashbourne in Derbyshire (known as Royal Shrovetide Football)
- Atherstone Ball Game in Warwickshire. The Shrove Tuesday Ball Game is played annually along the line of an old Roman road that runs through the town known as Long Street. The game has been played for over 800 years, dating back to the reign of King John from 1199 to 1216.
- Corfe Castle in Dorset: The Shrove Tuesday Football Ceremony of the Purbeck Marblers
- Haxey in Lincolnshire (the Haxey Hood, actually played on Epiphany). In 1752 the Julian calendar was changed for the Gregorian calendar. To achieve this the days between 2 and 14 September were omitted that year. In some villages people thought it was not possible to remove 11 days from a year so refused to accept the new calendar. As a result, Christmas Day was celebrated on 5 January in those villages. The Haxey Hood is played the following day on what would have been the feast of Stephan or Boxing Day if 11 days had not been removed from the calendar. The game is played with a 2 foot (60 cm) leather tube, "the hood", rather than a ball, and the aim is to get the hood to one of four pubs in the village.
- Hurling the Silver Ball takes place at St Columb Major in Cornwall: A "Town against Country" match takes place on Shrove Tuesday and a return match is played the following Saturday. Another version of Cornish Hurling takes place at St Ives; this game used to involve men who lived at the top of town against those at the bottom end. Nowadays it is a much gentler version for children only. This version takes place on Feast Monday, normally February.
- Bottle-kicking, Hallaton, Leicestershire. A game played on Easter Monday which shares common elements with medieval ball games played during celebrations marked by the Christian calendar.
- Sedgefield Ball Game played in County Durham on Shrove Tuesday.
- Workington in Cumbria holds three Uppies and Downies matches over the Easter period. There are no rules, except those suggested by cunning and skill, while brute force is of the greatest importance. The goals are about a mile apart. The Uppies attempt to hail the ball at the gates of Workington Hall while the Downies hail at the capstan at the harbour side.

=== Scotland ===
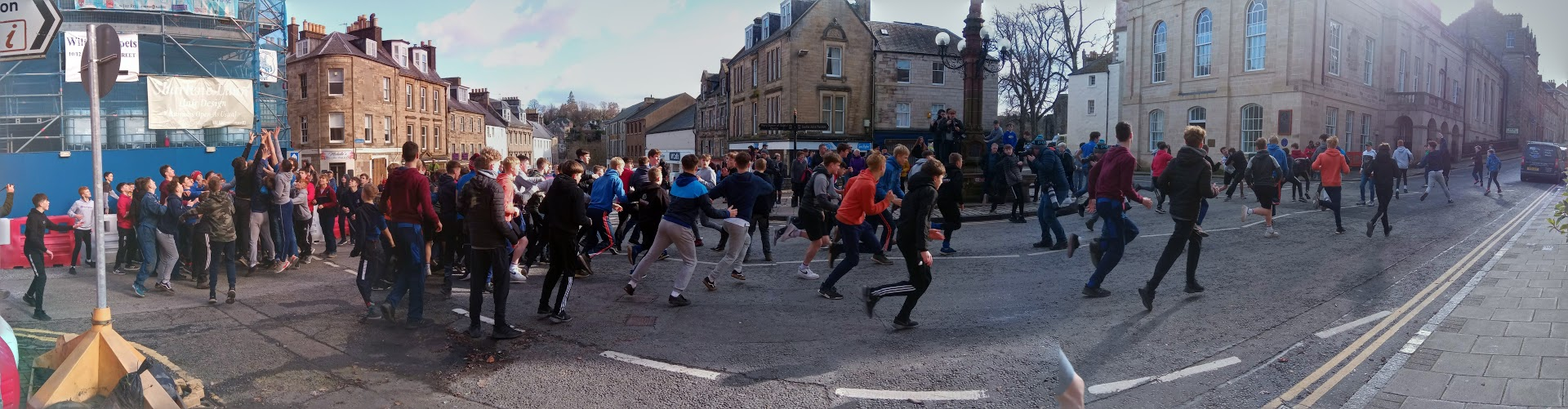
Jedburgh Ba' Game in 2020.

In Scotland the Ba' game ("Ball Game") can be found at:

- Duns, Berwickshire
- Hobkirk, Scottish borders. Handba' game played the Monday before or after Shrove Tuesday.
- Jedburgh, Roxburghshire
- Scone, Perthshire
- Kirkwall, Orkney

=== Europe ===
- La Soule in Normandy and Brittany, France.
- Lelo burti, a Georgian game similar to rugby.
- Knattleikr, an Icelandic revival of an ancient game played by Vikings
- Calcio Fiorentino – a modern revival of Renaissance football from 16th-century Florence, played in Italy

=== Outside Europe ===
- Cuju, China
- Kemari, Japan.
- Kī-o-rahi, a Māori game.
- Marn grook, an Australian Aboriginal ball game.
- Yubi lakpi, Manipur, India.
- Mesoamerican ballgame, an ancient, Pre-Columbian American game.

== Extinct medieval ball games ==
- United Kingdom
  - Chester-le-Street in County Durham had a game played between the Upstreeters and Downstreeters that was played until 1932.
  - Derby had perhaps the largest known football gatherings from every 2 p.m. on Shrove Tuesday and Ash Wednesday where the town was split into St Peter's and All Saints parishes. There were several attempts to ban the game, described in 1846 as "the barbarous and disgusting play of Foot-Ball, which for a great number of years has annually disgraced our town". In that year the military were brought in and after the police cut the first ball to pieces, another ball was produced and the town's Mayor was "stuck on the shoulder by a brick-bat, hurled by some ferocious ruffian, and severely bruised". The Derby Football was banned in 1846, although was played once more in 1870.
  - Dorking in Surrey: On the afternoon of Shrove Tuesday, the shops were shut and a ball was kicked through the town by "an excited mob". The game, which was started by the town crier, was played between the Eastenders and the Westenders, who tried to keep the ball in their own territory. An attempt to ban the game in 1897 failed when the hundred policemen who there to enforce it, actually joined-in the game instead. The game survived into the next decade.
  - East Anglia: Camp ball was a popular sport in the 15th century.
  - Newton Ferrers in Devon
  - Kingston upon Thames, Twickenham, Bushey and Hampton Wick, all near London. "The custom was to carry a foot-ball from door to door and beg money:—at about 12 o'clock the ball was turned loose, and those who could would kick it. In the town of Kingston, all the shops are purposely kept shut upon that day, there were several balls in the town, and of course several parties. The game would last about four hours, when the parties retire to the public-houses, and spend the money they had collected on refreshments."The Every-Day Book Shrovetide football was played in Kingston until 1866, after which it was banned.
  - Richmond had a game every Shrove Tuesday until 1840, when it was banned and several people were arrested after 50 police constables moved in to break up the disturbance.
  - Teddington: "it was conducted with such animation that careful house-holders had to protect their windows with hurdles and bushes."The Chambers' Book of Days 9 February
  - Torrington in Devon had Out-Hurling. "Once played on Trinity Monday, The sport of 'Out-hurling' was included in the 1922 Great Torrington Revel' Day. The publication Devon and Cornwall Notes and Queries 1922, volume 12, carried an account of the game, and noted that it had previously been a regular sport, and involved a small ball which was thrown 'over-hand', and a pitch approximately half a mile long (adjoining a brook)."Folklore, Culture, Customs and Language of Devon
  - In Wales a game known as Cnapan was once popular, notably at Llanwenog in Ceredigion, and Pwlldu in Pembrokeshire
- Ireland
  - Caid

== Pre-medieval games ==
- Neolithic Britain & Ireland.
  - Carved stone balls have been found at various sites in Scotland, northern England and north eastern Ireland. Spirals and rings of concentric circles carved on the balls can be found on standing stones and megalithic structures of the same period. Sites such as Maughanby Circle and Newgrange were designed to monitor the movements of the sun with special emphasis on the winter solstice. The connection with megalithic art suggests these carved stone balls had significant cultural importance to the pre-Celtic people who made them, though it might be thought difficult to play a ball game with a stone ball. They thought in a symbolic way and displayed ceremonial behaviour we may look upon today as religious. No written records exist for the Neolithic people of Britain and Ireland. From reading the archaeology it has not been possible to determine whether these peoples understood the concept of a ball game. However, as playing ball games feature in later religious festivities including Christmastide which coincides with Yuletide, the winter solstice and the Pagan rebirth of the sun the possibility cannot be ruled out.
- Ancient Greece
  - Episkyros
- Ancient Rome
  - Follis
- Roman Empire
  - Harpastum
- Australia
  - Marn Grook and other independently developed football games that predate colonialism of Australia.
