= Attempts to ban football games =

There have been many attempts to ban football, from the Middle Ages through to the modern days. The first such law was passed in England in 1314; it was followed by more than 30 in England alone between 1314 and 1667. Football faced armed opposition in the 18th century when used as a cover for violent protest against attempts to enclose common land. Women were banned from playing at English and Scottish Football League grounds in 1921, a ban that was only lifted in the 1970s. Female footballers still face similar problems in some parts of the world.

== Mass football in Europe ==
Mass or mob football was popular in medieval and early modern Europe. It involved an unlimited number of players and very few rules; the game often caused damage to people and property and was seen as a distraction from more desirable work which led to many attempts at banning the game in Britain and France.

=== England ===
Complaints by London merchants led King Edward II of England to issue a proclamation banning football in London on 13 April 1314 because "there is great noise in the city caused by hustling over large balls from which many evils may arise which God forbid; we command and forbid, on behalf of the King, on pain of imprisonment, such game to be used in the city in the future."

Playing football was seen as a distraction from practising archery, which was a mandatory occupation for every Englishman for much of the Middle Ages because archers were so valuable in battle at that time. This led Edward III and Edward IV of England to ban football in 1349 and 1477 respectively; the latter stated that "No person shall practice ... football and such games, but every strong and able bodied person shall practice with the bow for the reason that the national defence depends upon such bowmen." Richard II also tried to outlaw the sport in 1389, as did Henry IV in 1401.

Despite ordering the first known pair of football boots, Henry VIII of England attempted a ban in 1540. As with the other laws, this was only a partial success.

By 1608, the local authorities in Manchester were complaining that: "With the ffotebale ... [there] hath beene greate disorder in our towne of Manchester we are told, and glasse windowes broken yearlye and spoyled by a companie of lewd and disordered persons". That same year, the word "football" was used disapprovingly by William Shakespeare. Shakespeare's play King Lear contains the line: "Nor tripped neither, you base football player" (Act I, Scene 4). Shakespeare also mentions the game in A Comedy of Errors (Act II, Scene 1):

Am I so round with you as you with me,
That like a football you do spurn me thus?
You spurn me hence, and he will spurn me hither:
If I last in this service, you must case me in leather.

"Spurn" literally means to kick away, thus implying that the game involved kicking a ball between players.

King James I of England's Book of Sports (1618), however, instructs Christians to play at football every Sunday afternoon after worship. The book's aim appears to be an attempt to offset the strictness of the Puritans regarding the keeping of the Sabbath.

The Puritans had some success in suppressing "disorderly" sports including football after the English Civil War. Players were fined or sentenced to public humiliation in the stocks. The Mayor of York fined 11 players 20 shillings each when their game resulted in a smashed church window in the winter of 1659–60. The prosecution triggered a violent protest and resulted in over 100 armed men breaking into the Mayor's house; the ringleader was later fined 10 pounds or 400 shillings, a very large sum of money at the time. Football became even more popular following the Restoration in 1660.

The annual Shrove Tuesday game was first played in 1762 in the streets of Alnwick, and similar games were popular in many towns and villages at the time. The games were typically played in the streets which caused damage to property. A law was passed in 1818 banning street football. This law was ignored in Alnwick until 1827 when the Duke of Northumberland provided a field for the game to be played on legitimately.

=== Scotland ===
James I of Scotland decreed that Na man play at the fut ball, in the Football Act of 1424; a further act of parliament was passed under the rule of James II in 1457 which banned both football and golf.

=== France ===
The French game La soule is another mass participation ball game similar to the English and Scottish mob football. It was banned by Phillippe V in 1319, and again by Charles V in 1369.

In 1440 the bishop of Tréguier threatened players with excommunication and a fine of 100 sol, saying that "these dangerous and pernicious games must be prohibited because of hatred, grudges and enmities which, under the veil of recreational fun, accumulate in many hearts".

== Enclosure Acts ==
The Enclosure Acts placed common land into individual ownership and removed the rights of local people to use the land as they had previously. Football was used as a means to protest this enclosure, and the supposed football game was often a pretext to organise a riot. One such event in Deeping Level, north of Peterborough, led to the sheriff of Lincolnshire raising the posse comitatus to quell the riots. In 1740, "a match of futtball was cried at Kettering, of 500 men a side, but the design was to, 'Pull Down Lady Betey Jesmaine's Mill's'." In 1765, 2,000 acres (8.1 km^{2}) of land was enclosed at West Haddon, Northamptonshire. A game of football was advertised in a local newspaper and after the kick off the mob set about tearing down and burning the fences amounting to £1,500 worth of damage.

== Street football ==
The British Highway Act 1835 banned the playing of football on public highways, and gave a maximum penalty of forty shillings to anyone who "shall play at Football or any other Game on any Part of the said Highways, to the Annoyance of any Passenger or Passengers." The provision against street football was repealed by the Highways Act 1959.

== Women's football ==
English women's football matches began in 1895 but following the first international match in 1920, women were banned from all affiliated FA grounds from 1921 to 1971 on the grounds that, "the game of football is quite unsuitable for females and ought not to be encouraged." The Scottish Football Association did not formally recognise women's football until 1973 after pressure from UEFA.

In 1931 the women's team from Fløya in Tromsø wrote to the Norwegian Football Association seeking permission to stage a series of fundraising matches. They played the first match before receiving a response: "Ladies should not play football... the ladies could also get injuries that destroyed their reproductive organs. Fløya should therefore not allow or let ladies enter the football field." Further fundraising matches had to be abandoned. Women continued to play football in Norway despite the lack of official recognition, and were accepted into the Norwegian FA in 1976.

The Iran women's football team forfeited an Olympic qualifying match because the team's dress code mandated wearing of the maghnaeh to cover their heads. FIFA ruled that the kit broke one of their rules and did not let Iran participate, which meant Jordan were awarded a 3-0 result for the forfeit. In July 2013 Libya's women's football team was banned from playing in an international tournament in Berlin, despite initially being given permission to attend. The Libyan Football Association gave concerns about the need for fasting during Ramadan as the reason for this ban.
