= The Bewties of the Fute-ball =

The Bewties Of The Fute-ball

Brissit brawnis and brokin banis,
Stride, discord and waistie wanis.
Crukit in eild syne halt withal,
Thir are the bewties of the fute-ball.

The Bewties Of The Fute-ball is a brief, anonymous Middle Scots poem of the sixteenth century. It depicts the game of medieval football, as it was played in the same era, as being violent and unruly.

== Historical context ==
Ball games played between opposing teams were widespread in pre-modern Europe. Many localities are known to have had a variety including the Calcio of Florence and La Soule of northern France

In Scotland, football games were common enough for the Scottish Parliament to attempt to outlaw them on several occasions. An act of 1457, under James II, is typical. The act was principally intended to encourage archery practice but decreed that football, and also golf, should be simultaneously discouraged.

Item. It is ordanyt and decretyt that Wapinschawing be haldin be the lordis and baronys spirituale and temporale four tymes in the yeir. And that the futebawe and the golf be uterly cryt done and not usyt.

or in translation,

Item. It is ordained and decreed that weapon shows be held by the Lords and Barons, Spiritual and Temporal, four times a year and that football and golf be utterly cried down and not used.

Despite these bans, in 16th-century Perth apprentices progressing to become master craftsmen traditionally had to pay for a banquet and hold a football match. Several ball games which appear to predate the modern era exist in modern Scotland. The Kirkwall Ba Game is an example.

== The text ==
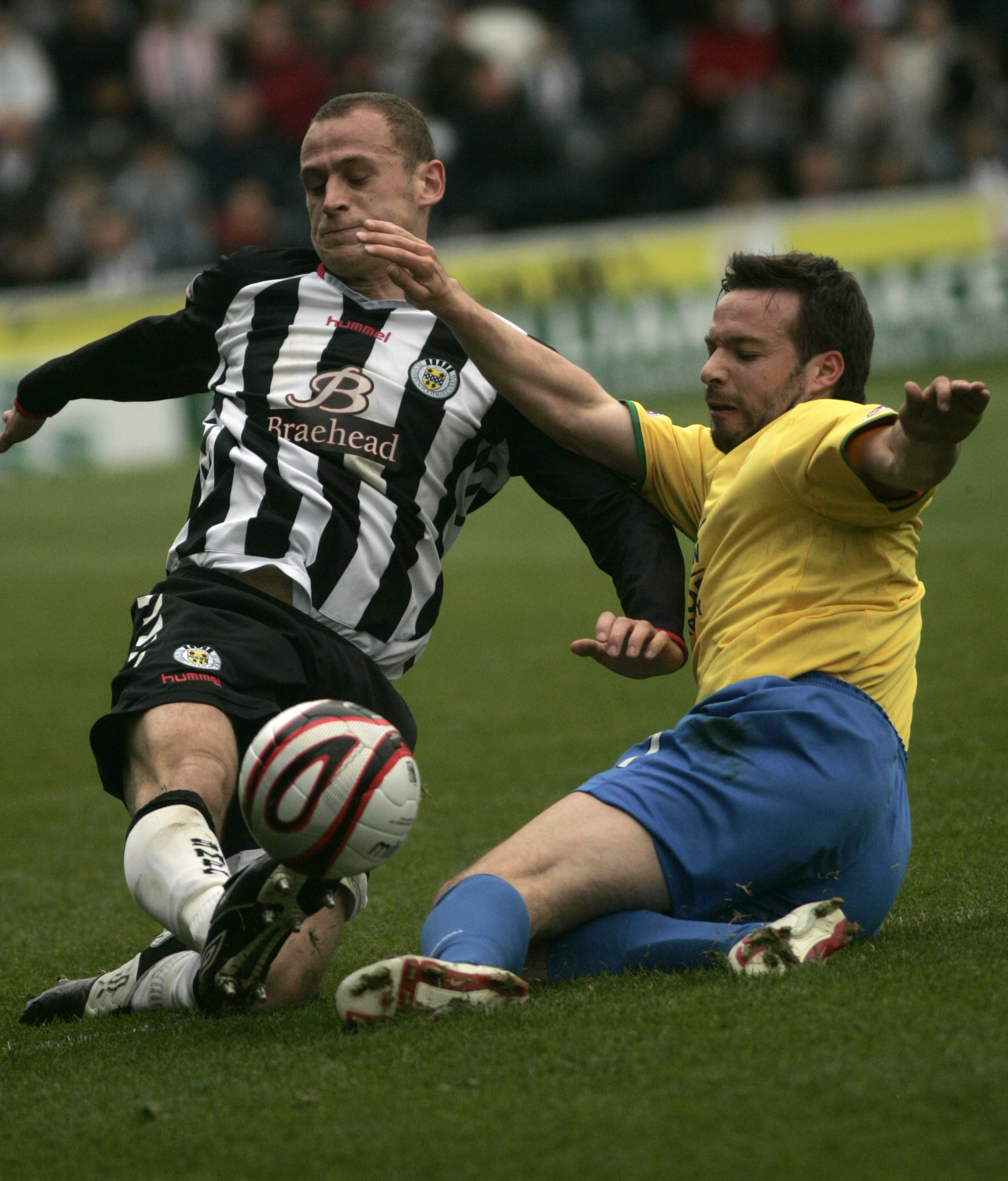
Modern association football (Saint Mirren versus Hamilton Accies)

The Bewties Of The Fute-ball is preserved only in the Maitland Folio Manuscript of the latter sixteenth century. It consists of two pairs of rhyming couplets and it is attributed to no author.

Brissit brawnis and brokin banis,
Stride, discord and waistie wanis.
Crukit in eild syne halt withal,
Thir are the bewties of the fute-ball.

In Modern Scots:

Birsed brawns an breuken banes,
Stride, discord an wastie hames.
Creukit in eild syne haut withaw,
Thir are the beauties o the fitbaw.

The poem might be translated into modern English as,

Torn muscles and broken bones,
Strife, discord and impoverished homes.
Stooping in old age then lameness too,
Those are the beauties of football.

It is not clear whether the poem is genuinely criticising the game for its roughness or praising it ironically for the same reason.
