= Football Act 1424 =

Act of the pre-Union Parliament of Scotland banning football

- Act of Parliament
- Parliament of Scotland
- Long title: Of playing at the fut ball.
- Citation: c. 18 [12mo ed: c. 17]

Dates
- Royal assent: 26 May 1424

Other legislation
- Repealed by: Statute Law Revision (Scotland) Act 1906

Status: Repealed

The Football Act of 1424 (c. 18) was a doctrine passed by the Parliament of Scotland during the reign of King James I. It was a banning of the sport of Football, known in the time as "futbal."

== The Football Act ==
The act became law on the 26 May 1424; one of a set of statutes passed that day, the act is titled as "Of playing at the fut ball." As recorded by the Records of the Parliament of Scotland to 1707, through the University of St Andrews, the act states:

it is statut and the king forbiddis that na man play at the fut ball under the payne of iiij d. to the lorde of the lande als oft as he beis taintit (be the scheref of the land or his ministeris, gif the lordis will nocht punnysh sic trespassouris)

Or, in the official modern English translation of the act:

It is decreed and the king forbids that any man play football under the pain of 4 d. to the lord of the land as often as he is convicted (by the sheriff of the land or his ministers, if the lords will not punish such trespassers).

== Related acts ==
This banning of football is mentioned in many other acts in this era of Scottish law, which additionally ban the sport of Golf (see Golf in Scotland), instead requiring further practice of archery by its citizens. On the 7 March 1458, under James II's rule, an act titled "Concerning Wappenschaws" (English: musterings) states; "At the fut bal ande the golf be vtterly criyt done and nocht vsyt..." Or as recorded in modern archives: "...that football and golf be utterly cried down and not used... And touching football and golf, we ordain that it be punished by the baron's unlaw; and if he does not take it, it is to be taken by the king's officers... And each man within the parish past twelve years shall practice shooting." The ban again is mentioned on the 6 May 1471 under James III, stating "... that football and golf be discontinued in the future, and butts made up and shot used according to the tenor of the act of parliament." And finally by James IV, on the 17 April 1491; "that football, golf or other similar unprofitable sports are not to be played anywhere in the realm, but for the common good and defence of the realm the practice of shooting bows and archery butts are therefore ordained in each parish, under the pain of 40s to be raised by the aforesaid sheriff and bailies from each parish each year where it is found that archery butts or shooting practice is not done as is said." These Acts remained in force for several centuries; however, all eventually fell into disuse until finally being repealed by the Statute Law Revision (Scotland) Act 1906.

== See also ==
- Ba game
- Medieval football
- Football in Scotland
- Scotland in the Late Middle Ages
- Sport in Scotland
