= Illegal sports =

Competitive activities banned by law

An illegal sport is any sport that is illegal in one or more jurisdictions due to the violent or dangerous nature of the sport. Well-known illegal sports, such as cockfighting and dogfighting, are barred on the basis of animal abuse.

Illegal sports are controversial due to the dangerous aspects attributed to them and the pain they can inflict on humans or animals. They also are controversial due to the perceived nature of some of them — notably dogfighting — as being savage sports.

== Cockfighting ==
Cockfighting is a gambling and spectator sport where roosters fight, frequently to the death, in rings, while players place bets on which rooster will win. Often, sharp implements are attached to the legs of the birds, inflicting massive injuries and pain. The birds used for cockfighting sometimes are given stimulant drugs to enhance their fighting ability and make them more aggressive.

According to the Humane Society of the United States, cockfighting is illegal (at least a misdemeanor) in all fifty US states. It is classified as a felony in 39 states. Notable states that have less severe laws are Alabama, Hawaii, Idaho, and Mississippi (misdemeanor punishment for cockfighting; no punishment for possessing cock or being a spectator); South Carolina, South Dakota, Utah, and Kentucky (misdemeanor punishment for cockfighting, no punishment for possessing cocks, misdemeanor punishment for being a spectator).

Governor Frank Keating of Oklahoma said when outlawing cockfighting in his state that "Cockfighting is cruel, it promotes illegal gambling and it is simply embarrassing to Oklahoma to be seen as one of only a tiny handful of locations outside of the third world where this activity is legal." Since there is no reliable data on the status of cockfighting in the third world, it is assumed that cockfighting is largely legal, unpopular, or laws against it are unenforced amongst these nations.

== Dogfighting ==
Dog fighting is a practice, illegal in many jurisdictions, where two dogs, often a bull-type terrier breed, are put into an area to fight and sometimes kill each other. Dog fighting has been reported as far back as AD 43 when the Romans invaded Britain. Both sides employed fighting dogs, and out of their wartime use grew a sport, which achieved great popularity, particular in Britain and later the United States.

Dogfighting can involve high stakes, and carries with it the same sociological dangers of other gambling, and particularly illegal gambling, activities.

The American Society for the Prevention of Cruelty to Animals focuses heavily on the issue of dog fighting. There are various levels of dog fighting. There is a “street” level, which means that the dogfights are informal because strict rules and regulations are absent from the matches. Another level is “hobbyists”, which are fights that are formally organized. They are mainly scheduled for income and speculators. The final level of dog fighting is “professional.” At the professional level, owners usually have more than fifty fighting dogs and carefully examine the specific breed, lineage, and winning history of each dog.

Dog fighting is illegal in every U.S. state and many countries around the world (Britain, where it was quite popular, banned it as far back as the 1830s), although enforcement in other countries is frequently lax or nonexistent. Dog fighting is a felony in all states except Idaho and Wyoming, where it's a misdemeanor. It is a felony to possess dogs for fighting except in the states of New York, Texas, West Virginia, and Wyoming.

== Street racing ==
Street racing is the frequently illegal racing of motor vehicles on public roads and highways. These high-speed races, usually with untrained drivers, can result in fatal crashes that have the capacity to inflict damage on innocent people not participating in the race. In 2006, California state highway patrol issued 697 citations for "speed contests". There is no official statistic kept on street racing deaths. Street racing can become an addicting habit for many drivers.

== BASE jumping ==
BASE jumping is a form of parachuting from buildings. The sport is illegal in almost all cities, because the jumpers seriously risk sustaining injuries, or causing problems for pedestrians or motorists when they land. In many cases, BASE jumpers illegally access the high points from which they jump. Two BASE jumpers were arrested in St. Petersburg, Russia after jumping off of the Cathedral of the Apostles St. Peter and St. Paul in November 2011.

== Skateboarding ==
Skateboarding was banned in Norway in 1978 out of fear of injuries. Importing, exchanging, or advertising for skateboards or skateboard parts, or to use skateboards was punishable by fines and by confiscations of the skateboards. Exceptions began being granted from 1984 onwards to certain organised skateboard groups, and the ban was fully repealed in 1989.

== See also ==
- Attempts to ban football games
