= Kirkwall Ba' Game =

Traditional ball game of Orkney

The Kirkwall Ba' Game (known locally as The Ba') is one of the main annual events held in the town of Kirkwall, in Orkney, Scotland. It is one of a number of Ba' Games played in the streets of towns around Scotland; these are examples of medieval football games which are still played in towns in the United Kingdom and worldwide. The games are played twice a year, normally on Christmas Day and New Year's Day, unless those days fall on a Sunday in which case the game is moved to the following day.

Played in the town centre of Kirkwall, the two sides are the Uppies and the Doonies, or more correctly, "Up-the-Gates" and "Doon-the-Gates" from Norn gata (path or road), although it is also common in Scots. The tradition belongs to Kirkwall and the surrounding area of St Ola, and has always been played by men from those two areas since before records began. In the past 50 years, mainly due to improved transport, the game's popularity has grown to include players from all areas of Orkney, including some of the outer isles. This has not met with universal approval from those associated with the game as its sheer size has become a problem from a safety perspective.

Scant information is available about the early history but some form of mass football appears to have been practised throughout Scotland and England for at least three centuries. Records from 1797 indicate that "Football is the principal diversion of the common people, which they practise with great dexterity". There is speculation that the game in Kirkwall may have its roots in folklore based on the tale of Sigurd and the Orkneyinga saga.

== Boys Ba' ==
The Boys Ba', as the name suggests, is restricted to those aged 15 years and below. There is no restriction on the lower age limit and small boys of sometimes as young as 5 years old can be seen around the edges, making their first tentative steps into the game. The Boys Ba' is thrown up from the Merket Cross on the Kirk Green on front of St Magnus Cathedral at 10.00, the start time recently having been moved from 10.30 due to the Boys Ba' having a tendency to last longer. The Boys game, like the Men's, has grown in size and popularity in recent years and the number of boys participating can number over 100.

The Boys Ba' has been known to last as little as 4 minutes (New Years Day 1985) or as long as eight hours and 30 minutes (New Years Day 2026). It can be very fluid, with its outcome often decided by a "break" whereby one of the faster boys manages to break free of the scrum and runs with the ba', making valuable ground, sometimes making it all the way to his team's goal, thereby ending the game. Boy's Ba' winners, in the sense of the individual boy who is awarded the ba' after the game as his personal property, will normally be boys playing in their final games prior to turning 16 years old, although there are occasions in history where a younger boy has managed to make off home with it, thereby claiming the ba' as his, despite having further years left to play in the boys game. Nowadays this is generally frowned upon, the conventional wisdom being that younger boys will have other chances to win a Ba', whereas the 15‑year‑olds will not.

Although a great honour, winning a Boy's Ba' does not affect status when moving up to the men's game. All young players are considered equal and must prove themselves on their individual performances in the Men's Ba'. Indeed, many players who were prominent in the boy's game prove to be otherwise when they step up to the Men's game, and vice versa.

== Men's Ba' ==
The Men's Ba' is thrown up also from the Merket Cross, when the cathedral bell strikes 13:00. The person chosen to "throw up" the ba', or begin the game, is usually an older Ba' stalwart, but the honour is occasionally given to some local public figure.

The waiting scrum can number up to 350 men and can be a sight to behold. Once thrown up, the Ba' disappears into the scrum and much surging play occurs while the two sides weigh each other up and determine who has the weight on their side on this occasion. Much exciting surging and turning play often occurs on this wider part of the street, which can frequently determine the outcome.

Occasionally, the ba' appears out of the scrum and someone makes a dash through the crowds of spectators. To the casual onlooker this can happen at any moment, but the seasoned Ba' watcher can often see what is happening long before the ba' suddenly erupts. Breaks sometimes occur on Broad Street, but can occur anywhere where one side gains sufficient control of part of the scrum.

The Doonies have the benefit of a flat push to Albert Street, while the Uppies have a hard push up to the top of Tankerness Lane. The game may also go down one of the flagstone lanes, or down Castle Street onto the open Junction Road. Once there either side may gain the upper hand by means of a smuggle and run, or the scrum may become immobile in one of the many closes and yards.

However, if the Uppies manage to enter Victoria Street, or the Doonies Albert Street, the opposition have a much harder time, due to the narrowness and the press of often many hundreds of keen spectators. All the same the Ba' may be restricted for several hours in any of the many lanes and neither side ever gives up the struggle until the goal is reached.

The longest a Men’s Ba game has lasted was 7 hours (New Year’s Day 1975) and the shortest was 4 minutes (Christmas Day 1952).

== Women's Ba' ==
Immediately after the end of World War II there was a movement to establish a Ba' game for women in Kirkwall. There were only ever two Women's Ba' games played, on Christmas Day 1945 and New Years Day 1946. The first ever winner of the Women's Ba' was Barbara Yule who was an Uppie. Following her death in 1999 the ba' she had kept since she won it, was returned to Orkney, and is on display in The Orkney Museum in Kirkwall. The second winner was Violet Couper who was also an Uppie. The two games played did not follow the pattern of the men's game and were very much running games. The women's game was abolished in subsequent years. History records the reasons for its discontinuation as being a general public dislike for female participation in a very physical and public spectacle, the attitudes of the time being that it was not "lady-like".

== Goals ==
The Doonies' goal is the sea, normally within the Basin of the Harbour, but so long as it is immersed in the salt water of Kirkwall Bay, the Ba' has gone doon. The Uppies must round the Lang, or Mackinson's corner at the junction of Main Street with New Scapa Road, opposite the Catholic Church, which was the site of the old town gates in bygone times. (The last remains of the town gates were removed in the 1950s, leaving the Uppie goal as the gable end of a house on Mackinson's Corner.)

== Awarding the Ba' ==
Once the Ba' has been goaled Up or Doon, lengthy argument often ensues among players on the winning side before a popular individual winner is acclaimed. This winner is awarded the trophy of the game, which is the ba' itself. When the winner is finally decided, he is normally held aloft and carried shoulder-high from the goal by his teammates in celebration, passing into the ranks of Ba' winners and into Kirkwall history.

To stalwart Ba' players, the ultimate honour is to be awarded a ba'. To have any chance of this honour, a player generally has to have played consistently well for a long period of time (usually around 20 years minimum). Ba' winners range from outstanding players in their early thirties to veterans in their mid to late forties.

There are several players who are what is known as a "double winner" in that they have been awarded both a Boys' Ba' and a Men's Ba' during their playing careers.

== Uppie or Doonie? ==
Originally the side any individual played on was decided by whether he was born up or doon the gate but when Kirkwall's Balfour Hospital was built in the 1950s, the majority of babies were born there, thus giving a heavy bias to the Uppies. This led to a swing toward family allegiances, meaning players played the same way as their forebears. This tradition continues to this day. For non-Orcadians or ferryloupers (incomers) or indeed anyone with no family history in the game, and often people from the isles or rural areas, their side is determined by the route taken on their first arrival in Kirkwall.

== Safety ==
The game has no official rules, but there is a code of honour among players whereby certain acts are considered strictly unacceptable. This code is generally adhered to extremely well by those who play the game and as result the game is self-regulating and self-policing, requiring no intervention from outside parties.

The game's popularity in recent times has led to the scrum of men becoming very large with up to 350 men playing at any one time. Forces within the scrum can be enormous, with broken and cracked ribs not uncommon. The scrum will collapse often during the game, at which point players are generally very good at ceasing play and aiding teammate and opponent alike to regain their feet.

Camaraderie within the game is excellent, although as with any highly physical male pursuit, tempers can and do flare. Such incidents are quickly extinguished by fellow players and grudges are not held.

The participation of visitors in the game is not encouraged, mainly for safety reasons but also as Orcadians are very protective of their tradition and do not wish to see it become a pursuit for "adventure tourists" as has happened with several other UK traditional ball games. The current scrum has become very large and those associated with the game believe that further players, particularly ones who have no appreciation of the dangers, tactics, allegiances or history of the game, will be no asset from a safety point of view. This view is endorsed almost universally throughout the game.
