= Cnapan Hotel =

Hotel and restaurant in Newport, Pembrokeshire, Wales

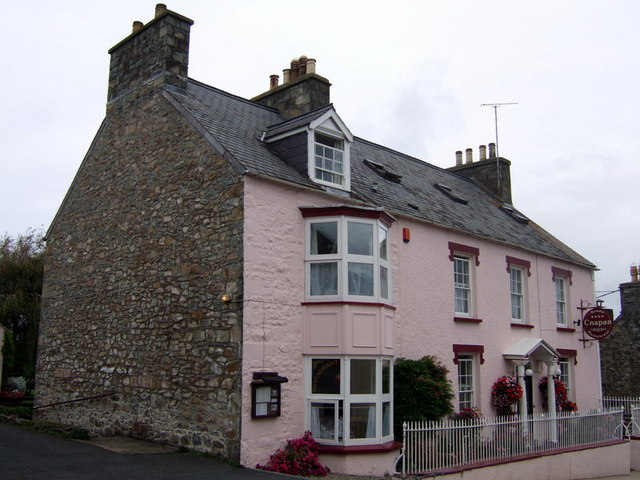

- Location in Pembrokeshire

General information
- Location: Newport, Pembrokeshire, Wales
- Coordinates: 52°1′1″N 4°49′50″W
- Owner: Michael & Judith Cooper

Other information
- Number of rooms: 5
- Number of restaurants: 1

Cnapan, also known variously as Cnapan Country House or Cnapan Restaurant and Bed & Breakfast, is a Grade II listed hotel and restaurant in Newport, Pembrokeshire. It lies along the main road of the town, East Street, which is part of the A487 road, opposite The Golden Lion.

== Architecture ==
It is set in a Grade II listed pink painted Georgian townhouse named Ivy House, in a small seaside town, and takes its name from the medieval Celtic sport of Cnapan, although there is little to connect the two today. Dated to the early 19th century, architecturally Ivy House, two-storeys with attic, is described as "painted roughcast, with panelled doorcase and fanlight, the porch with the etiolated, debased classical columns popular all over the region". There are three bays on each floor at the front, with a French window on each floor on the western wing, where the restaurant is located. Next door is Sessions House, dated to 1900, but with a stucco front with windows in the late 18th-century style. As of 2001 it had five double rooms, a bar, and a restaurant; it is the restaurant for which it has earned its reputation. The interior consists of traditional Welsh oak furnishings. In the hallway is a traditional heavy oak Welsh dresser which contains items belonging to the owners. In the sitting room is a wood-burning stove and books and magazines, and in the dining room is a large stone fireplace, with pictures and pieces of armour on the walls and lace-covered tables. The bedrooms are small, with pine furniture and bright hues, with a "tiny shower". The hotel has been run by the Coopers since 1984; Judith Cooper and her daughter are the chief cooks. It became a Grade II listed building on 14 April 1992.

== Reception ==
It has featured in The Good Hotel Guide and The Good Food Guide. The Western Mail said that it has a "restaurant that was 'large and well patronised', this hotel had an air of rural France, so generous and cheerful." The Christian Science Monitor similarly mentioned its "cozy atmosphere, delicious home cooking." In 1997 The Independent noted that the owners "scour the hills, beaches and local markets for herbs and fresh ingredients for their stunning creations." The restaurant serves Welsh cuisine and is noted mainly for its fish and meat dishes.
