= Bottle-kicking =

Leicestershire traditional sport

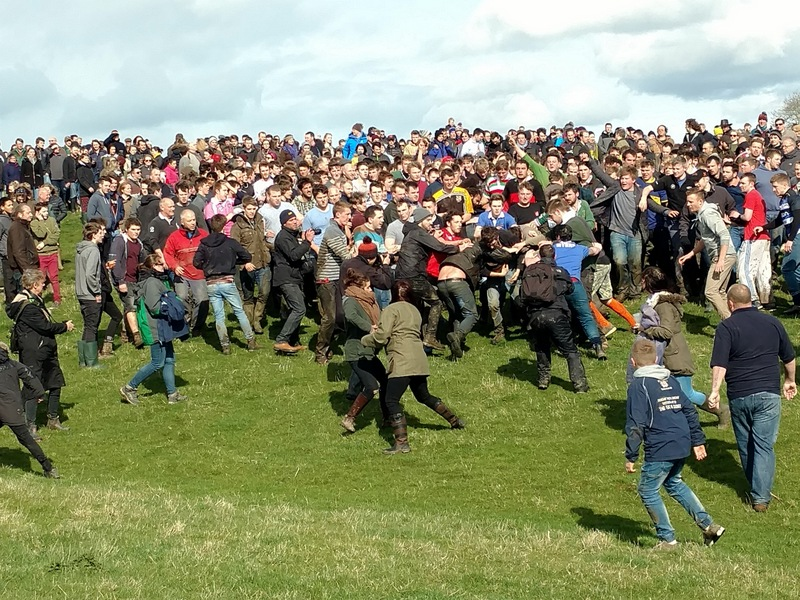
The 2016 game. The barrel is being held by a player at the front and centre of the scrummage.

Bottle-kicking is an old Leicestershire custom that takes place in the village of Hallaton each Easter Monday. It is an outdoor sport played across a mile-long playing area, in which two teams attempt to move a wooden barrel (known as a "bottle") across the opposing team's stream at the far end of the area.

Records of bottle-kicking date to the late 18th century, but the custom is thought to originate much earlier, from before the Christian era.

== Origin and history ==
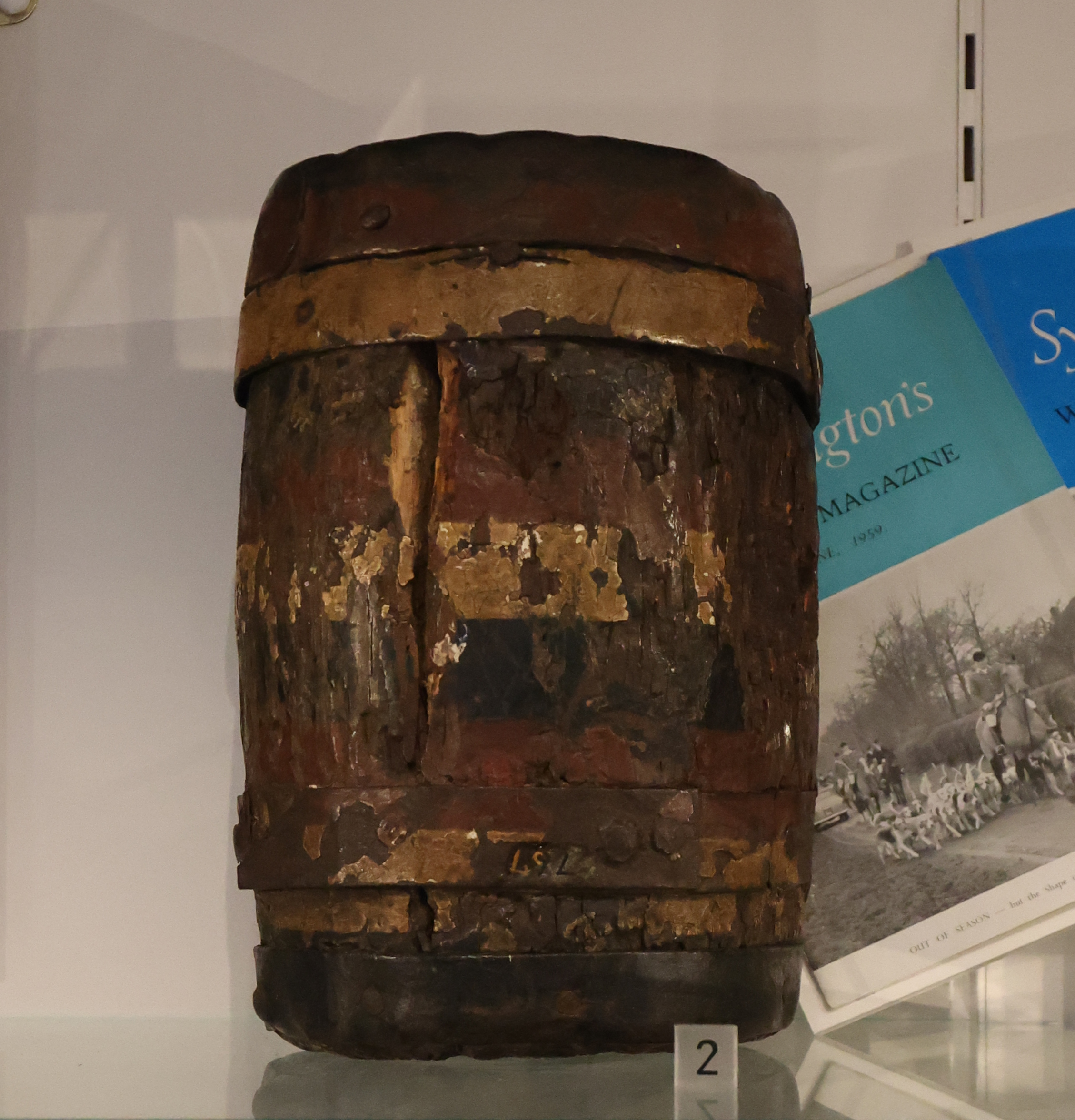
Bottle used between 1850 and 1950

Local lore claims that the custom began when two ladies of Hallaton were saved from a raging bull by a startled hare, distracting the bull from its charge. To show their gratitude to God for sending the hare, they made a gift of land to the church, on the understanding that every Easter Monday, the vicar would provide a hare pie, twelve penny loaves, and two barrels of ale for the poor of the village. The Hallaton villagers would fight each other for the food and drink, and on one occasion, the residents of the neighbouring village of Medbourne joined the fray and stole the beer. The Hallatonians cooperated to retrieve the spoils, thus beginning the village rivalry that still exists.

Other explanations of the custom's origin include the idea that the tradition harks back to England's pagan past, when hares were sacrificed to the goddess Ēostre.

Bottle-kicking has been an annual tradition for over 200 years. The tradition has been cancelled only twice in that time: once in 2001 because of concerns over foot-and-mouth disease, and also in 2020 due to the coronavirus (COVID-19) pandemic. Legend has it that the rector of Hallaton, opposed to the tradition because of its pagan origins, tried to ban the event in 1790. However, he relented the next day, after the words "No pie, no parson" appeared scrawled on the wall of the vicarage overnight.

A doggerel song relating to these sports was mentioned in 1924.

J. B. Firth included an account of the bottle-kicking in his Highways and Byways in Leicestershire (1926): "Hallaton is best known throughout the shire for certain preposterous Easter Monday festivities which attract the vulgar from near and far." "The game goes to the winners of two out of the three bottles, but as Hallaton always wins the first two bottles Medbourne never has a chance. It is a firm tradition of the game that Hallaton must win."

Cranoe has never picked a definite side when playing in the annual tournament of "Bottle-kicking", deciding not to choose between Hallaton and Medbourne, but acting more as a freelance force, helping whichever side is losing until the last minute, when they then switch (if necessary) to the winning side.

== Procession and hare pie scramble ==
The event starts with a parade through the villages of Medbourne and Hallaton. Locals carry a large hare pie and the three "bottles", which are actually small kegs or barrels. Two of the bottles are filled with beer; the third, called "the dummy", is made of solid wood and painted red and white.

The pie is blessed by the Hallaton vicar before being cut apart and thrown to the crowd for the "scramble". The rest is placed in a sack to be carried up the nearby Hare Pie Hill.

The bottles are then taken to the Buttercross (a conical structure with a sphere on top, used for keeping butter and cheese cool when the village was a market town) on the village green to be dressed with ribbons. Here, the penny loaves are distributed to the crowd.

The order of events in 2009 was as follows:

- 9.30am: Parade through Medbourne, traditionally held to ‘wake’ the villagers.
- 10am: Tug-of-war match between Ashley and Medbourne in the field behind The George pub in Ashley.
- 11am: Church service in Hallaton at 11am.
- 1.45pm: Hare Pie parade from the Fox Inn, Hallaton, to the church gates.
- About 2.50pm: Parade departs to the bottle kicking field, with the pie handed out to the crowd.
- 3.15pm: ‘Kick-off’

== Game ==
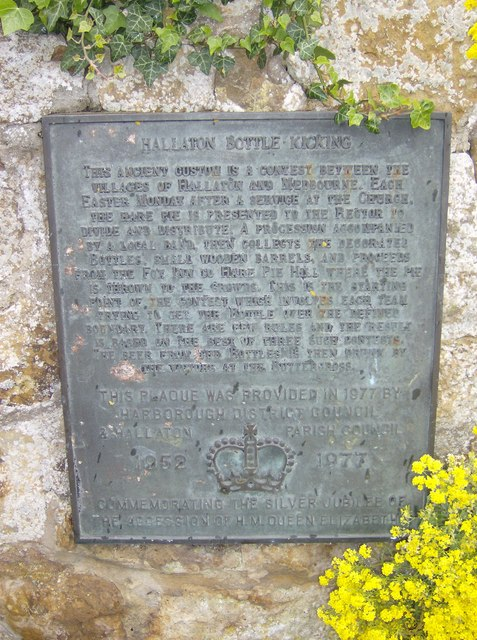
The commemorative plaque, 1977

There are virtually no rules to the bottle-kicking, except that there is no eye-gouging, no strangling, and no use of weapons. In the early afternoon, the hare pie is spread on the ground at a dip at the top of Hare Pie Bank, which is possibly the site of an ancient temple. Each bottle is then tossed in the air three times, signalling the start of the competition. Each team tries to move the bottles, on a best-of-three basis, across two streams one mile (1.6 km) apart, by any means possible.

The contest is a rough one, with teams fighting to move the bottles over such obstacles as ditches, hedges, and barbed wire. Broken bones are not unheard-of, and emergency services are generally on standby.

After the game, participants and spectators return to the village. Those players who put in an especially good effort (for example, carrying a barrel across the goal stream or holding on to a barrel for quite some time) are helped up onto the top of the ten-foot-tall Buttercross, and the opened bottle is passed up for them to drink from before being passed around the crowd.

The festive day normally draws to a close with participants and spectators retiring to the pub for drink and banter.

Locals say a visiting grandson took the basics of bottle-kicking back to his university in Rugby, creating the modern game of rugby football. The rugby ball also mimics the shape of the small beer keg (bottle) used in the event.

== See also ==
- Cranoe: a nearby village which participates in the game
- Haxey Hood: a similar sport from Lincolnshire
- Ba game: a game played in towns in Scotland
- Shrovetide Football: a similar game played in Ashbourne in Derbyshire
