= George Owen of Henllys =

Welsh antiquarian, author, and naturalist

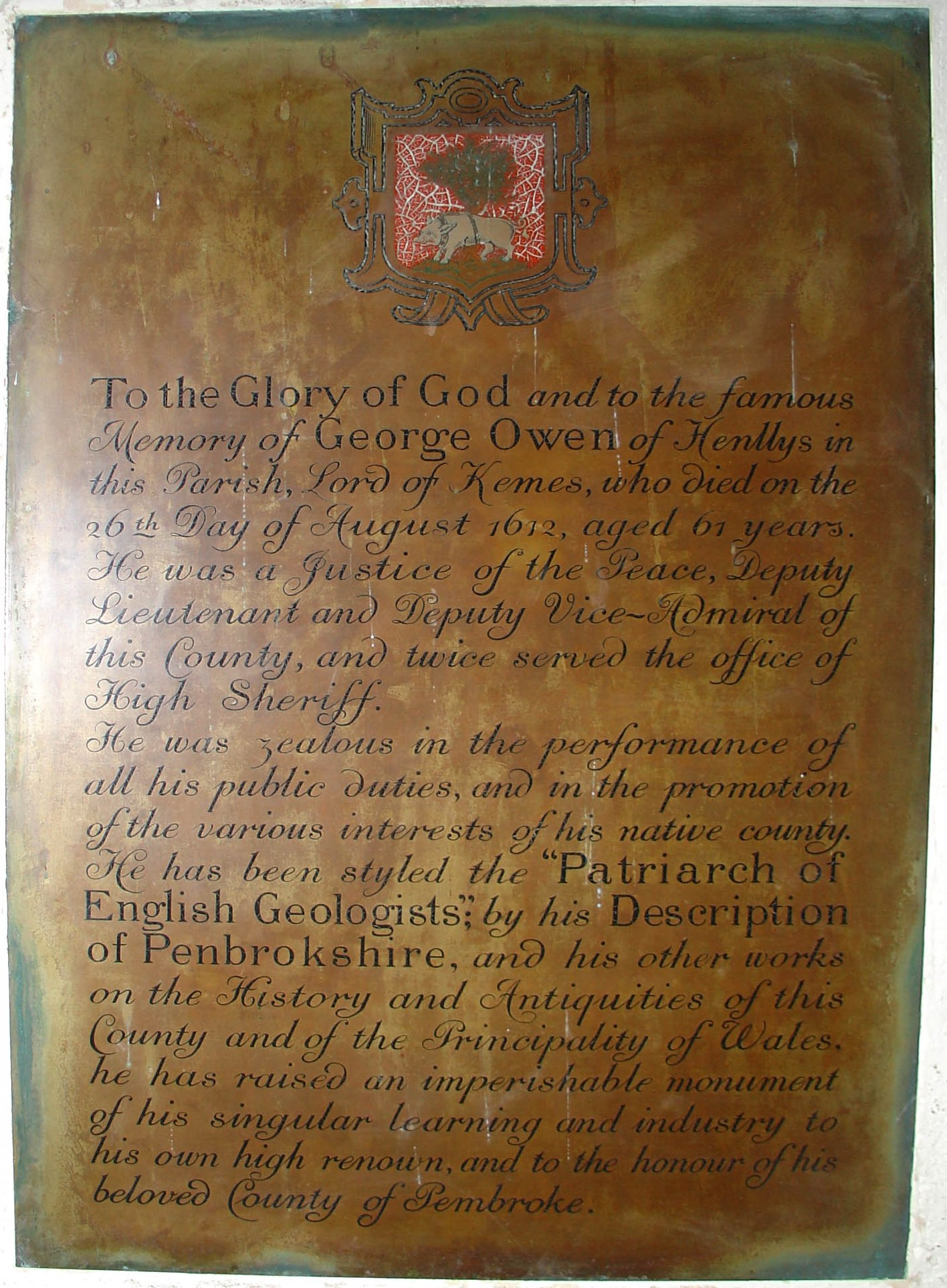
Plaque commemorating Owen in Nevern church

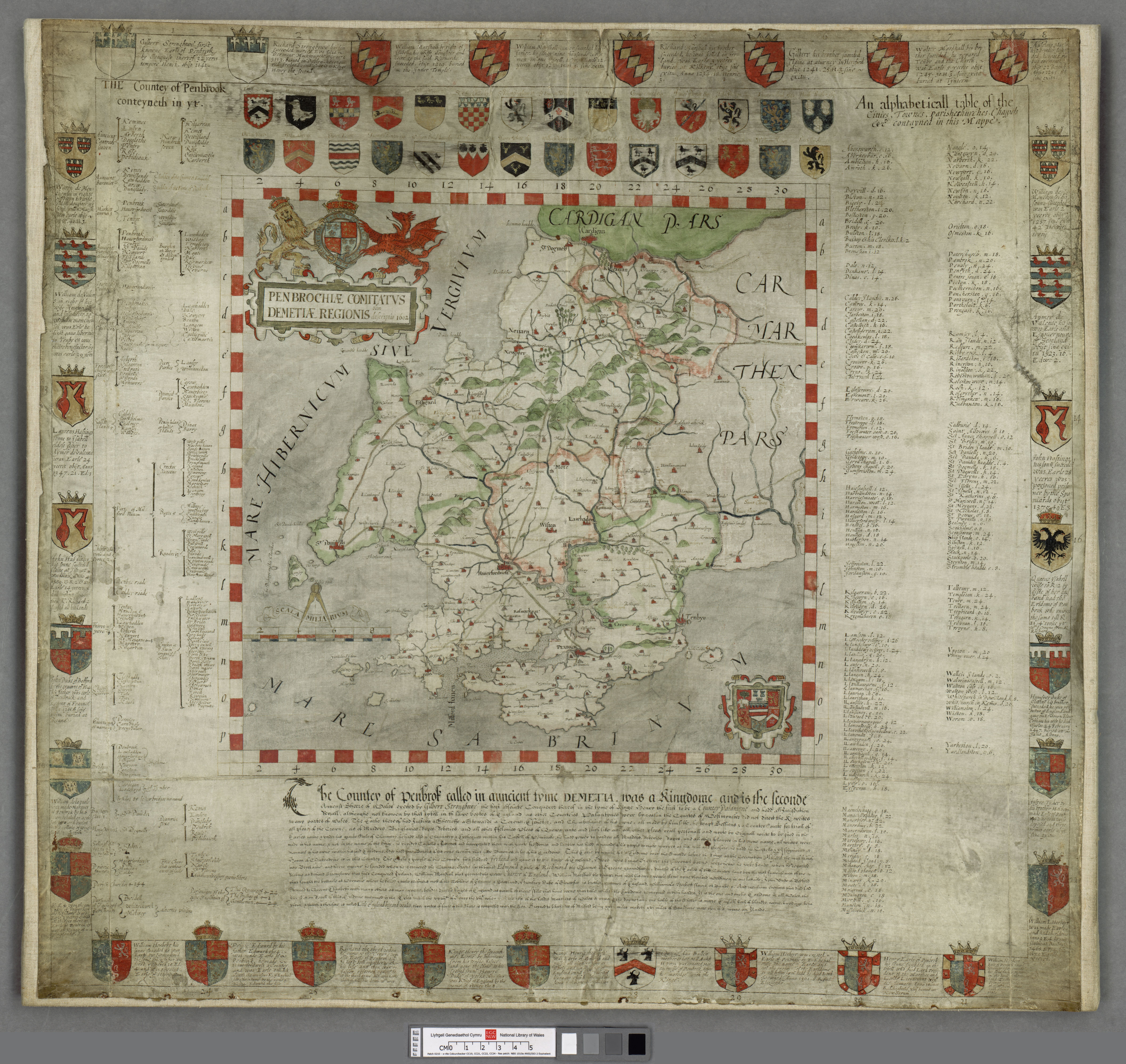
George Owen's map of Pembrokeshire, 1602

George Owen of Henllys (1552 – 26 August 1613) was a Welsh antiquarian, author, and naturalist.

== Early life ==
George Owen was the eldest son born to Elizabeth Herbert and William Owen in Henllys of the parish of Nevern, near Newport, Pembrokeshire. William Owen (c. 1486–1574) was a successful Welsh lawyer who purchased the Lordship of Kemys. Following his father's death, he inherited the estate.

== Lordship of Kemys ==
George Owen was educated in law at the Inns of Court in London. He spent considerable time fighting a series of lawsuits against family enemies in the county over ownership of manorial franchises.

== Welsh historian ==
During his life span he collected antiquarian information about Wales, including the heraldry, genealogy and historical buildings and structures. He also studied the topography of the county of Pembrokeshire and other parts of Wales. During his studies he performed observations of the geology of Wales, including the strata of limestone and coal. Although he did not actually form geological theories about the formations of these strata, he has earned a certain reputation as the progenitor of British geology.

He was a literary man who was reflective of this period of interest in history and antiquities during the Elizabeth era. He associated with a small circle of writers in Pembrokeshire, and was the patron to numerous Welsh bards.

== Pembrokeshire defence ==
From 1587 until 1590 he served as the Deputy Lieutenant of Pembrokeshire, and he reprised this role from 1595 until 1601. In this service he was responsible for the military defensive, including the fortification of Milford Haven against possible Spanish invasion, and he trained the local militia for the county. He also served as the High Sheriff of Pembrokeshire in 1587 and 1602.

He died in Haverfordwest and was buried at Nevern. In the Nevern church he is commemorated as the "Patriarch of English Geologists". The wrinkle ridge Dorsum Owen on the Moon is named after him.

== Family ==
In 1571 he was married to Elizabeth Phillips. The couple had eleven children, including the eldest son, Alban Owen, born in 1580. George Owen was a son by Owen's second wife.

== Bibliography ==
- A Dialogue of the present Government of Wales, 1594.
- The Number of the Hundreds, Castells, Parish Churches and ffayres...in all the Shiers of Wales later more commonly called the Description of Wales, 1602.
- The Description of Penbrokshire, 1603. Reprinted in Cambrian Register, Volume 2, 1799
- a map of Pembrokeshire (1602), which was published in the sixth edition of the Britannia (1607).
- B. G. Charles, George Owen of Henllys: A Welsh Elizabethan (NLW, 1973).

== See also ==
- Cnapan
