= Scoring the Hales =

Annual medieval football game played in Alnwick, England

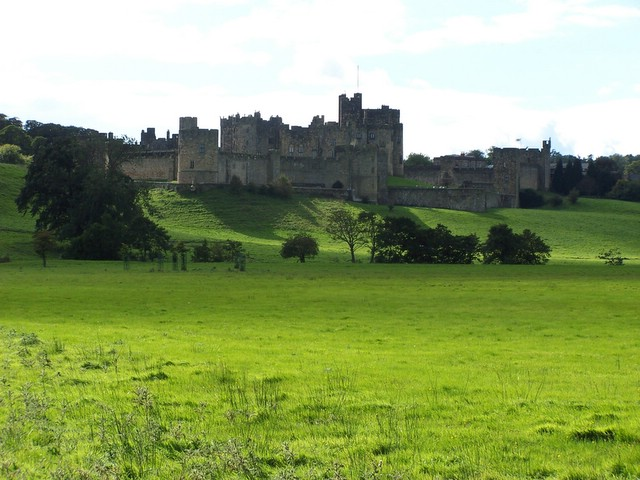
The procession begins at Alnwick Castle and the game is played on The Pastures (foreground)

Scoring the Hales (also known as The Alnwick Shrovetide Football Match) is a large scale Shrovetide football match played yearly in the English market town of Alnwick, Northumberland. Once a street contest, it has now moved to a field named The Pastures across the River Aln from Alnwick Castle.

The fixture between the parishes of St Michael and St Paul, first recorded in 1762, is one of the few surviving games of medieval football still being played. The game has only a few rules and involves large teams of roughly 150 persons on either side. The goals are decorated with greenery and stand about 400 yards (370 m) apart. As well as the large teams, the tradition attracts hundreds of spectators.

The original game started with the ball being sent over the barbican of the castle to the crowd assembled below. It was then kicked through the streets of the town. Kicking the ball through the town was discontinued in the 1820s and the game was moved to the pastures. Nowadays the game is proceeded by a piper-led procession from the castle to The Pastures, beginning with the ball being ceremonially thrown from the castle, a role traditionally undertaken by the Duke of Northumberland.

The game is won by whichever team is first to score two "hales" or goals. After the game the ball is carried to the river and thrown in. Whoever manages to get it out at the far side of the river is allowed to keep the ball, but they have to swim the River Aln to get it.

== See also ==
- Hailes (ball game) – Scottish sport
