= Camping (game) =

Football game played in England

Camping, also known as campyon, campan, or campball, was a football game played in England. It appears to have been popular in Norfolk and other parts of East Anglia. Of all the traditional forms of football played in Europe, it appears to have been one of the toughest and most dangerous, which probably explains why it died out during the early 19th century.

The first English-Latin dictionary, Promptorium parvulorum (circa 1440), offers this definition of camp ball: "Campan, or playar at foott balle, pediluson; campyon, or champion"

The game was originally played in the middle of town, where the objective was to take the ball to the opposing side of town. It was later played in the country, often in a special field set aside for the purpose known as a camping-place, camping close, or camping pightle. A reminder of this old game can be found in Swaffham, where behind the market place lies the Camping land, where the game was played. The custom in medieval times was to play games after church services, and often camping fields were sited near the church.

Although this game was rough, it was not without rules. In fact, evidence from Moore (1823) indicates teams, goals, rules, and even ball passing existed between team members (a development often attributed to a much later time):

Each party has two goals, 10 or 15 yards apart. The parties, 10 or 15 on a side, stand in line, facing each other at about 10 yards’ distance midway between their goals and that of their adversaries. An indifferent spectator throws up a ball the size of a cricket ball midway between the confronted players and makes his escape. The rush is to catch the falling ball. He who first can catch or seize it speeds home, making his way through his opponents and aided by his own sidesmen. If caught and held or rather in danger of being held, for if caught with the ball in possession he loses a snotch, he throws the ball [he must in no case give it] to some less beleaguered friend more free and more in breath than himself, who if it be not arrested in its course or be jostled away by the eager and watchful adversaries, catches it; and he in like manner hastens homeward, in like manner pursued, annoyed, and aided, winning the notch or snotch if he contrive to carry or throw it within the goals. At a loss and gain of a snotch, a recommencement takes place. When the game is decided by snotches seven or nine are the game, and these if the parties be well matched take two or three hours to win. Sometimes a large football was used; the game was then called “kicking camp”; and if played with the shoes on “savage camp.”

If the game described by Moore in 1823 was substantially the same as medieval "camping", then despite the Promptorium's notable definition of it as a form of "foott balle," the game apparently involved no kicking and was rather reminiscent of the passing game in rugby.

A match at Diss Common in the early 19th century reportedly was so brutal that nine men were killed or died of their injuries. While some people thought that camping was a combination of all athletic excellence, others saw it as little more than a stand-up fight. The contest for the ball "never ends without black eyes and bloody noses, broken heads or shins, and some serious mischief," a writer said in 1830, when camping popularity was at its height.

A modified game called "civil play" banned boxing as a component of the game. The game was played by passing the ball from hand to hand. To score, a player had to carry the ball through his own goal. Matches were usually for the best of seven or nine goals or "snotches", which normally took two to three hours, but a game of 14 hours had been recorded in a county match.

A feature of so-called friendly matches were prizes for those who played well. These consisted of money, hats, gloves, or shoes. Incidents of violence seem in the end to have turned public opinion against camping, and it was gradually replaced by a gentler kicking game. This game had roused great scorn amongst camping enthusiasts when it first began to make its influence felt in the 1830s.
