= La soule =

Traditional team sport

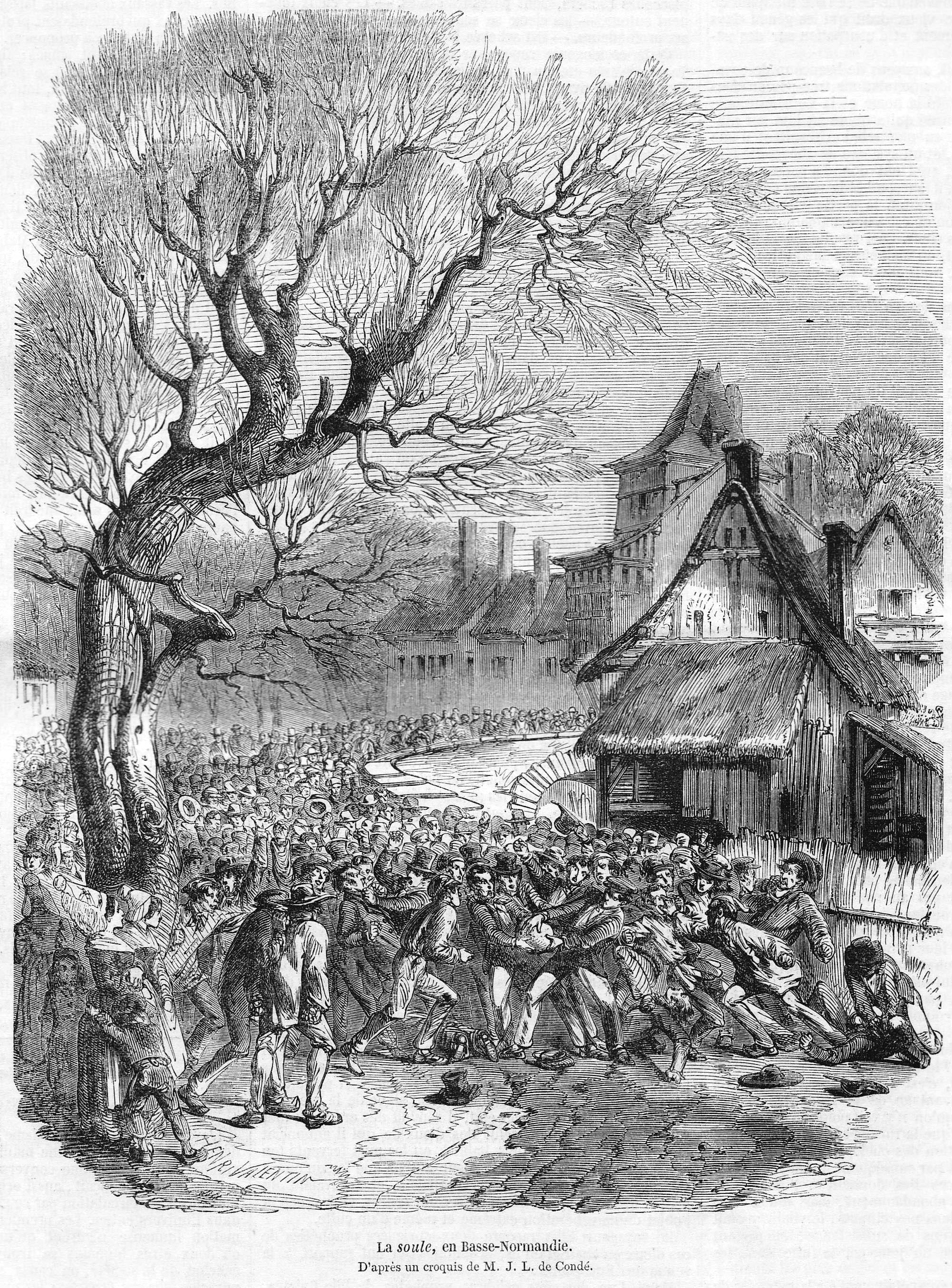
1852 Soule match in Normandy

La soule, later choule (French: chôle), is a traditional team sport that originated in Normandy and Picardy. The ball, called a soule, could be solid or hollow and made of either wood or leather. Leather balls would be filled with hay, bran, horse hair or moss. Sometimes the balls had woolen pompons.

== Early records ==
It would appear that ball games, such as la soule, developed naturally as a pastime, if only tossing the ball around. Such a game would be played wherever crowds of people met, e.g., after church services on Sundays or on religious holidays. La soule was played chiefly on the Christian holidays of Easter, Christmas, or on occasion at weddings or the day of the patron saint of the parish. The play could be aggressive, sometimes violent. It involved getting a ball to the opponents' goal, using hands, feet or sticks. It was not uncommon for participants to be injured, and broken limbs were often reported. The sport seems to have been a very important stress release for the common villagers.

- 1147 – A charter in France specifies the payment of an amount of money and handing over of "seven balloons of greatest dimension".
- 1283 – The only reference to a game in Cornwall dates from this year. A man named Roger was accused of striking a fellow player in a game called soule with a stone, a blow which proved fatal. The details were recorded in the plea rolls no. 111.
- 1393 – In Paris, a game took place in front of Saint-Eustache.
- 1396 – The rules of the game were codified. The soules were getting large as people were trying to exceed their predecessors, but this zeal had to be restricted. A rule dated 1412 limited the size of the ball or soule, stating that it had to be small enough to be held with one hand. This habit disappeared within the 16th century.
- 1365 – Documents record the game of soule as an ordinance of Charles V that "the solles cannot appear among the games which serve the exercise of the body". Moreover, it does not appear that the Breton sovereigns (Brittany being independent at the time) continued the game, as it was not under the same ecclesiastical authority.
- 1440 – Another prohibition by the bishop of Tréguier made it clear that this game had been practised for a long time. He threatened the players with excommunication, or very severe punishment, and 100 grounds of fine. La soule was very appreciated at that time, if it was necessary to inspire fear to put an end to play, but that did not stop the eagerness of the souleurs.
- 19th century – From this time on, the majority of the soules were taking place at Morbihan, in spite of their prohibition. Only the war put an end to this play because the young men all were mobilized.
- 1841 – At Bellou-en-Houlme contestants numbered up to 800 and there were said to be 6,000 spectators. The ball was three feet around and weighed 13 pounds. In this game, the losing side would often cut the ball in half with their knives. To prevent this, the ball was sheathed in tin.

== Play ==
The rules of soule were relatively simple. Generally two teams competed, often two parishes. The aim of the game was either to bring the ball back to just in front of the team's parish church, with or without the use of sticks (the ball was usually made from a pig's bladder, covered with leather) or to deposit the ball in front of the opposing team's parish church, which was sometimes quite far and entailed going through fields, forests and over rivers and streams. Occasionally, but not always, there were posts. The game was started at the geographical border between the two parishes; it was also sometimes organised between teams of single versus married men. The size of the team could vary from 20 to 200 players. However, sometimes three parishes played in a single game. In Auray, a soule involved 16 parishes, possibly with more than 500 participants. Nothing was forbidden by the rules, and the game could last for several days, until the players were completely exhausted.

All the parishes' inhabitants came out to watch and encourage players. A large crowd surrounded the player that threw up the ball to begin the game.

Before its prohibition, the clergy and nobility also took part in the sport. Members of the clergy could take part or at least launch the ball once at the beginning. In Vieux-Viel, the soule was launched at the door of the castle, and was then taken to the cemetery by the priests and the officers of the parish. Finally, the soule could be placed with the presbytery or a vault. In Vitré, it was displayed in the church the day of Saint-Étienne. However, in spite of the importance of the play, nobles and members of the clergy gave up participation during the 18th century.

== Playing areas ==
Traditional games seem not to have had any particular pitch or defined playing field. Soule was practised in meadows, woods, moors, and even ditches or ponds. The goal was to bring back the ball to a place indicated; the hearth of a house or any other place chosen by the players. In certain cases, it was even necessary to soak the soule in a spring or pool of water before placing it in ash. The play was thus only one immense scrimmage intersected with more or less keen frays. The ball could be made of leather, fabric, or wood, a pig bladder filled with hay, or even a wooden block.

Fixed playing grounds were not necessary because the game was played in a wide, variable area. However, the game's start was always in a fixed area; the town square, a cemetery, castle, or meadow. Rules were not always precise. The dates of play were set often early in the new year, before springtime. After this time many of the souleurs would be busy in the fields.

== Modern revivals ==
The last recorded games seem to date from between 1930 and 1945. One of the last recorded games was between the villages of Saint-Léger-aux-Bois and Tracy-le-Mont, in the Oise department of Picardy, which is situated 35 miles north of Paris.

There have been several attempts to revive the game in some form or other:

- Since 2011, a championship has been held in Normandy with six teams. A festival is held in Jersey, Guernsey or Normandy every year, normally involving some re-enactment of choule.
- An attempt to revive choule to celebrate the Football World Cup 1998, held in France.
- Tricot, a village in the Oise, still plays la soule on the Sunday after Shrove Tuesday.
- Soule was played in 1994 in Vouillé, in Vienne.
- Since 2003, the villages around Vendôme (between Le Mans and Blois) have been playing the game annually in early September. An open invitation was extended by the Vendômois French in order to increase numbers and popularity and players from the Bulldogs Rugby Club, Twickenham, UK, have taken part since 2008. Games of soule at Vendôme typically take place in a flooded woodland area, with two teams each of around 40 players, chosen at random using a pack of playing cards, i.e. red or black team. The "ball" is a heavy pyramid-shaped leather sack stuffed with straw which becomes extremely heavy when wet and difficult to handle. Goals are designated by painting a single tree red at either end of the pitch and a goal is scored by touching the opponents' tree with the ball by whichever means possible. There is no referee or timekeeper and, although there are few rules, good sportsmanship is encouraged. The game ends by mutual consent once a side is deemed too far ahead on goals to be caught; games usually lasting 2–3 hours.
- On 11 February 2017, 16 players met for a revival of the soule and played during 4 periods of 15 minutes, in the village of Saint-Césaire-de-Gauzignan. Although the beginning seemed messy, the players quickly understood the rules and the game went well.

== Variations ==
- Choule crosse – "Choule [with a] stick". Five players, with substitutes able to enter constantly. The ball was made of string or packing and rag surrounded of leather, approximately 10 cm in diameter with a weak rebound. Personnel included a field referee and two goal referees.
- Grande choule – played with large teams, and very rough like rugby. The ball could be played with hands or feet.
- La petite crosse, or petite choulethe – An early version of cricket, played with bats and wickets. No records of it exist, except in early engravings.

== See also ==
- Knattleikr – a Viking ball game which may be the origin of la soule/choule.
- Caid – an early Irish ball game similar to la soule/choule.
- Cnapan – a medieval Welsh sport said to be coeval with la soule/choule.
- Episkyros – an Ancient Greek ball game
- Trigon – a Roman ball game
- Medieval football – in Europe
- Royal Shrovetide Football – heraldic similarity – three cockerels
- History of physical training and fitness
