= Uppies and Downies =

Sport in England

Uppies and Downies is a version of Hand Ba game, with roots in even earlier games, played in Workington, West Cumbria, England. The modern tradition began some time in the latter half of the 19th century, with the match played annually at Easter to raise money for local charities.

== The game ==
The object of the game is to "hail the ball" (throw it up in the air three times) at the team's goal. The Downies' goal is a capstan on the Prince of Wales' dock, while the Uppies' is the gates of Workington Hall Parklands.

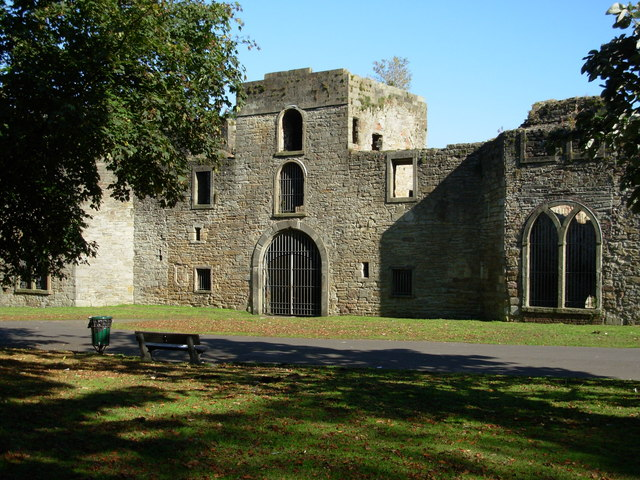
Curwen Hall.

There are no other ostensible rules of play and the game is primarily a rough and tumble scrum interspersed with break-away sprints by members of one team or the other, with some similarities to rugby. Some players from outside Workington take part, especially fellow West Cumbrians from Whitehaven and Maryport, resulting in about a thousand players on each team.

== The ball ==
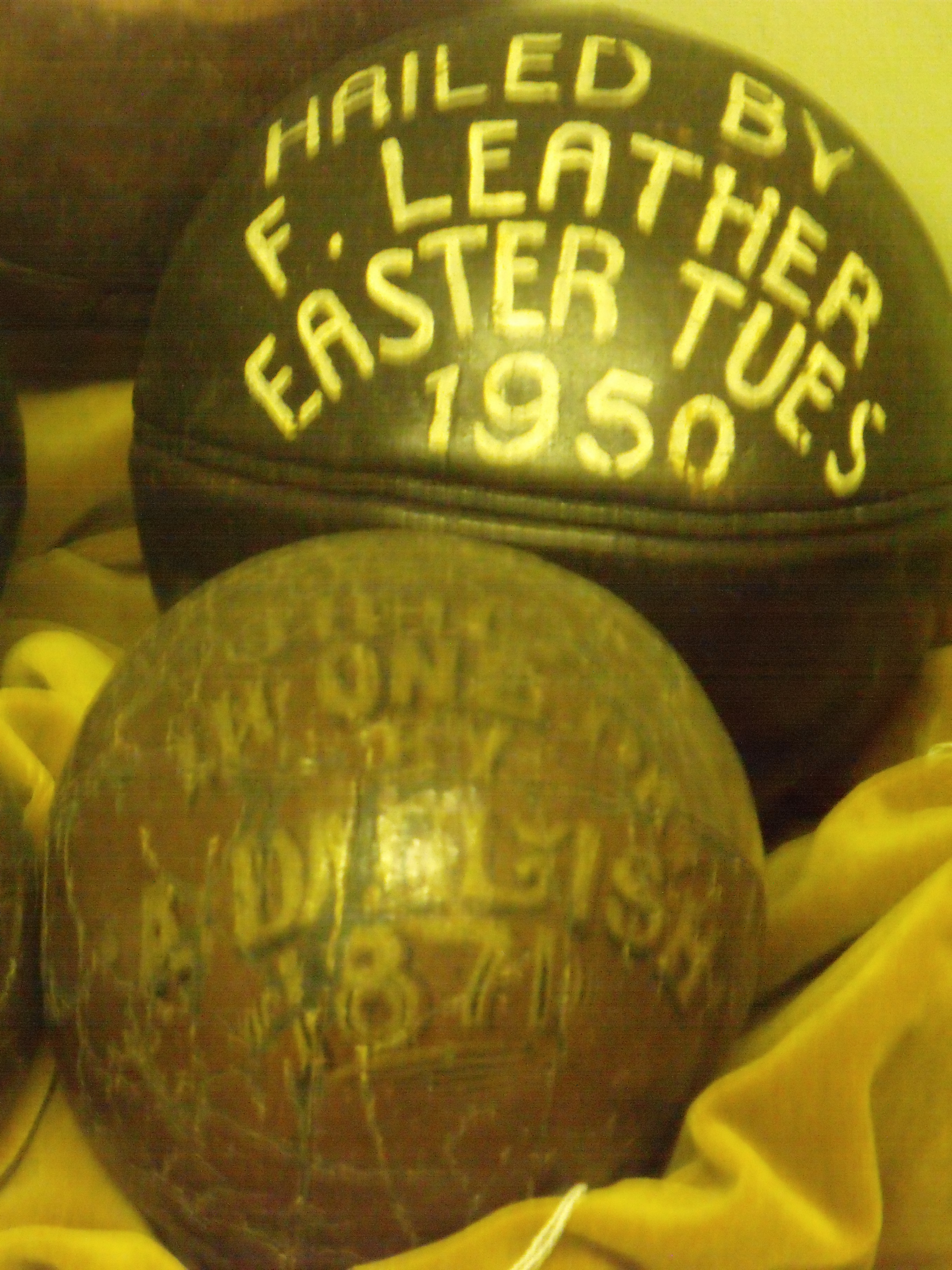
Uppies and Downies balls hailed in 1871 and 1950.

An Uppies and Downies ball is made from four pieces of cow leather. It is 20 inches (51 cm) in circumference and weighs about two and a half pounds (1.1 kg). Only three hand-made balls are produced every year and each is dated.

== Prizes ==
The player who hails the ball gets to keep the ball and will take the ball into the Town centre for people to get photos with for donations.

== Socioeconomics ==
Uppies and Downies refer to the residents of the top (East) and bottom (West) of the town, which slopes down towards the sea. In the modern incarnation of the game, the Downies were originally residents of the marsh and quay, a working class area of the town demolished in the early 1980s and traditionally looked down at by the more affluent top of the town.

== Safety concerns ==
Due to its unpredictability, the game can spill over into the town centre. In the past, police have issued safety advice to visitors and local parents warning of getting caught up in the inevitable rough and physical encounter.

== Statues ==
A pair of coal-black iron-ore coloured figure statues created by Maryport sculptor Colin Telfer depict the Easter mass event; one stands outside Workington Hall, and the other at the town harbour.

== Threat from supermarket development ==
In 2009, a proposed development plan to build a Tesco Extra store on the Cloffocks threatened the future of the event. The plans were dropped in 2011.
