= Ba' Game =

Scottish version of medieval football

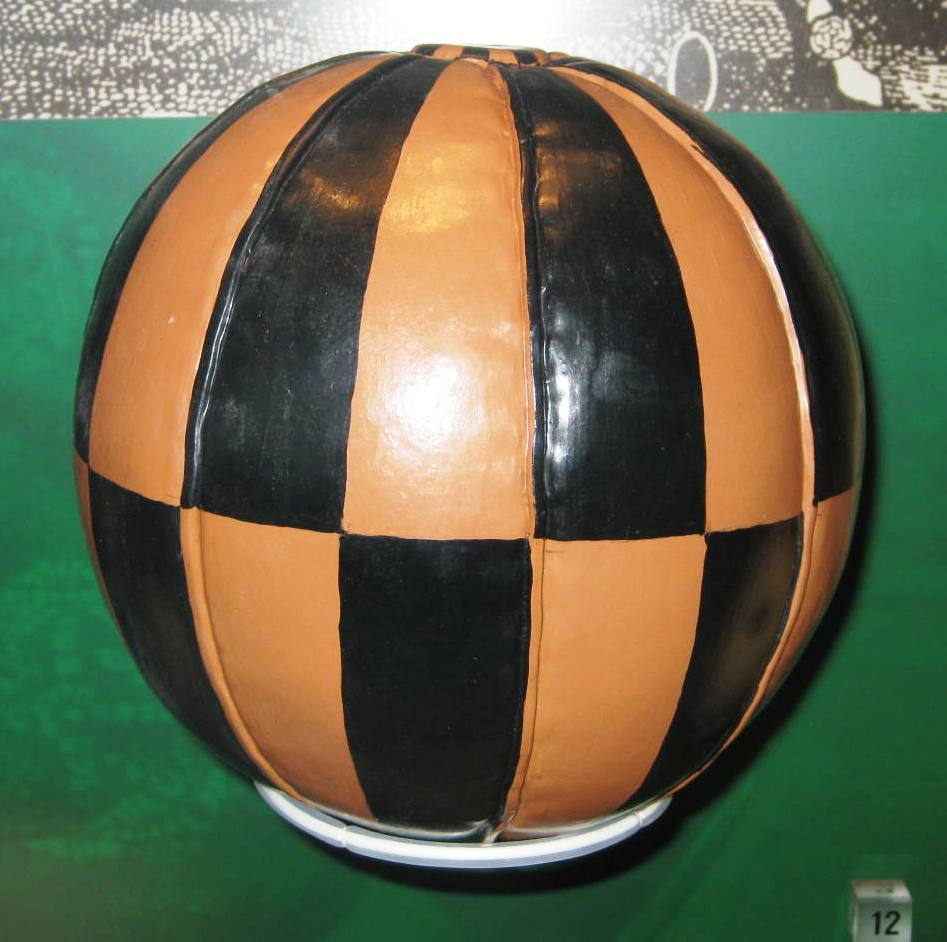
Example of a ball used in the Kirkwall Ba game on display in the National Football Museum, Manchester.

The Ba' Game is a version of medieval football played in Scotland, primarily in Orkney and the Scottish Borders, around Christmas and New Year.

Ba' is essentially mob football, or village football, where two parts of a town have to get a ball to goals on their respective sides. The two sides are called the Uppies or the Doonies, depending on which part of town they were born, or otherwise owe allegiance to. The ball must be man handled, and play often takes the form of a moving scrum. The game moves through the town, at times going up alleyways, into yards and through streets. Shops and houses board up their windows to prevent damage. Unlike traditional mob football, people are generally not hurt from play.

It is thought that at one time there may have been more than 200 similar games across the UK, with around 15 still being played today.

== Surviving games ==
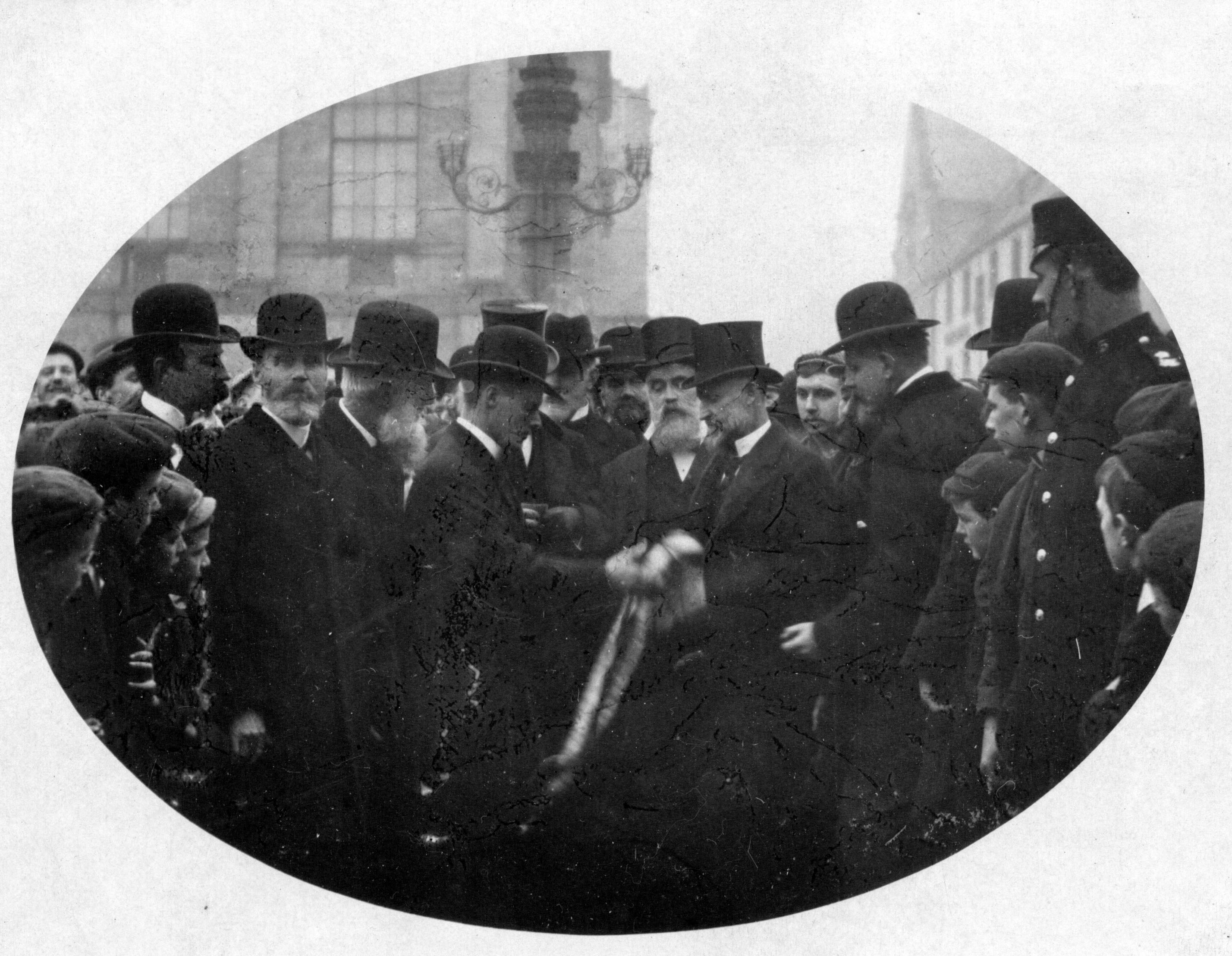
The game of hand Ba' played in Jedburgh streets in 1901. The participants are dressed in black, mourning the recent death of Queen Victoria.

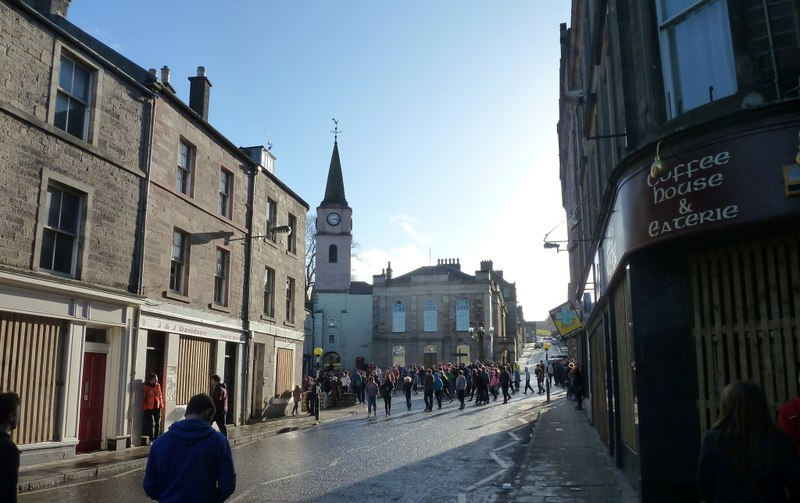
Jedburgh shops boarded up below where the game is in play

Ba' Games are still played in:

- Duns, Scottish Borders: the Ba' Games forms part of the Duns, Scottish Borders Summer Festival. Goals are at opposite corners of the Market Square, by the White Swan hotel and the old Post Office. It is played between the married men and bachelors of the town.
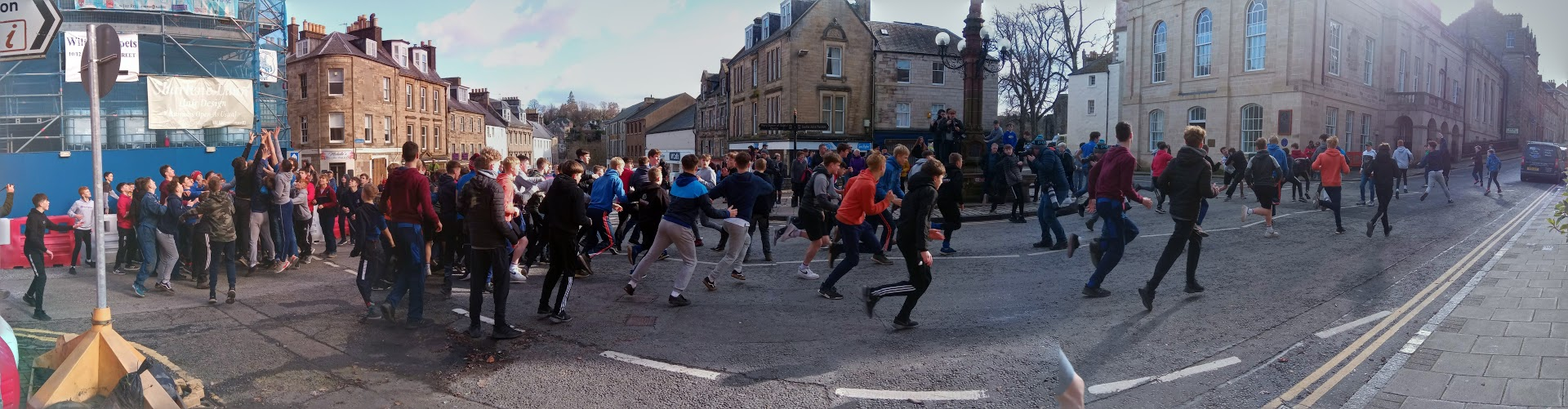
The laddies game in Jedburgh in 2020; on the left they reach for the ball and the uppies then take it to the right.
- Jedburgh: the game can be traced back to at least 1704. Play starts at the Mercat Cross in the centre of the town on the Thursday after Shrove Tuesday. The uppies, who first entered the town or were born south of the Mercat Cross, hail (score) the Ba' at the top of the Castlegate by throwing the Ba' over a fence at Jedburgh Castle. The doonies, who first entered the town or were born to the north, hail by rolling the Ba' over a drain (hailing used to be done by throwing the Ba' over a burn which has now been built over; the drain is directly above the burn) in the road at a street just off the bottom of High Street. The laddies' game starts at midday and the men's game at 2 pm. Both games run until the last Ba' has been hailed. Most years this means that both games are running at the same time. There is no boundary as to where the game is played, with most of the play occurring in the town centre. This can prove awkward for shoppers, trying to avoid getting caught up in the game, and shopkeepers, who put shutters on their doors and windows. The only known year the game wasn't played was in 1901 as it coincided with Queen Victoria's funeral.
- Roxburgh
- Kirkwall (Kirkwall Ba' Game)
- Scone, Scotland: in this version the men of the parish would assemble at the cross, with married men on one side and bachelors on the other. Play went on from 2 o'clock till sunset. Whoever got the ball in his hands would run with it till he was overtaken by one of the opposition. If he was not able to shake himself loose, he would throw the ball to another player unless it was wrestled away by one of the other side. No player was allowed to kick the ball. The object of the married men was to "hang" the ball: to put it three times into a small lid on the moor which was their "dool", or limit; while that of the bachelors was to "drown" or dip the ball in a deep place in the river, which was their limit. The party who achieved either of these objectives won the game; if neither won, the ball was cut into equal parts at sunset.
- Workington, Uppies and Downies
