= Atherstone (disambiguation) =

Atherstone is a market town in the English county of Warwickshire. Atherstone may also refer to:

In geography

- Atherstone Town F.C., Atherstone's football club
- Atherstone Rural District, a defunct local authority
- Atherstone Priory, a priory in Warwickshire, England
- Atherstone on Stour, a village, also located in Warwickshire
- Atherstone, Somerset, a town in Somerset, England
- Atherstone Nature Reserve, a 23,500 hectare reserve situated close to Dwaalboom, in the Limpopo province of South Africa
- Atherstone, Melton, a housing development in City of Melton, Victoria, Australia

Military

- HMS Atherstone is the name of several Royal Navy ships
- RAF Atherstone, a former Royal Air Force base located south west of Atherstone on Stour

In transport

- Atherstone railway station, a railway station in Atherstone
- Atherstone rail accident, a rail accident which occurred at Atherstone railway station in 1960

Other uses

- Atherstone Hunt, a fox hunt based in Warwickshire
- Atherstone Ball Game, a medieval football game placed on Shrove Tuesday in the English town of Atherstone, Warwickshire

As a surname

- Edwin Atherstone (1788–1872), poet and novelist
- William Guybon Atherstone (1814—1898) medical practitioner, naturalist and geologist, one of the pioneers of South African geology and a member of the Cape Parliament
