= Atherstone =

Market town and civil parish in Warwickshire, England

Coordinates: 52.5787°N 1.5462°W

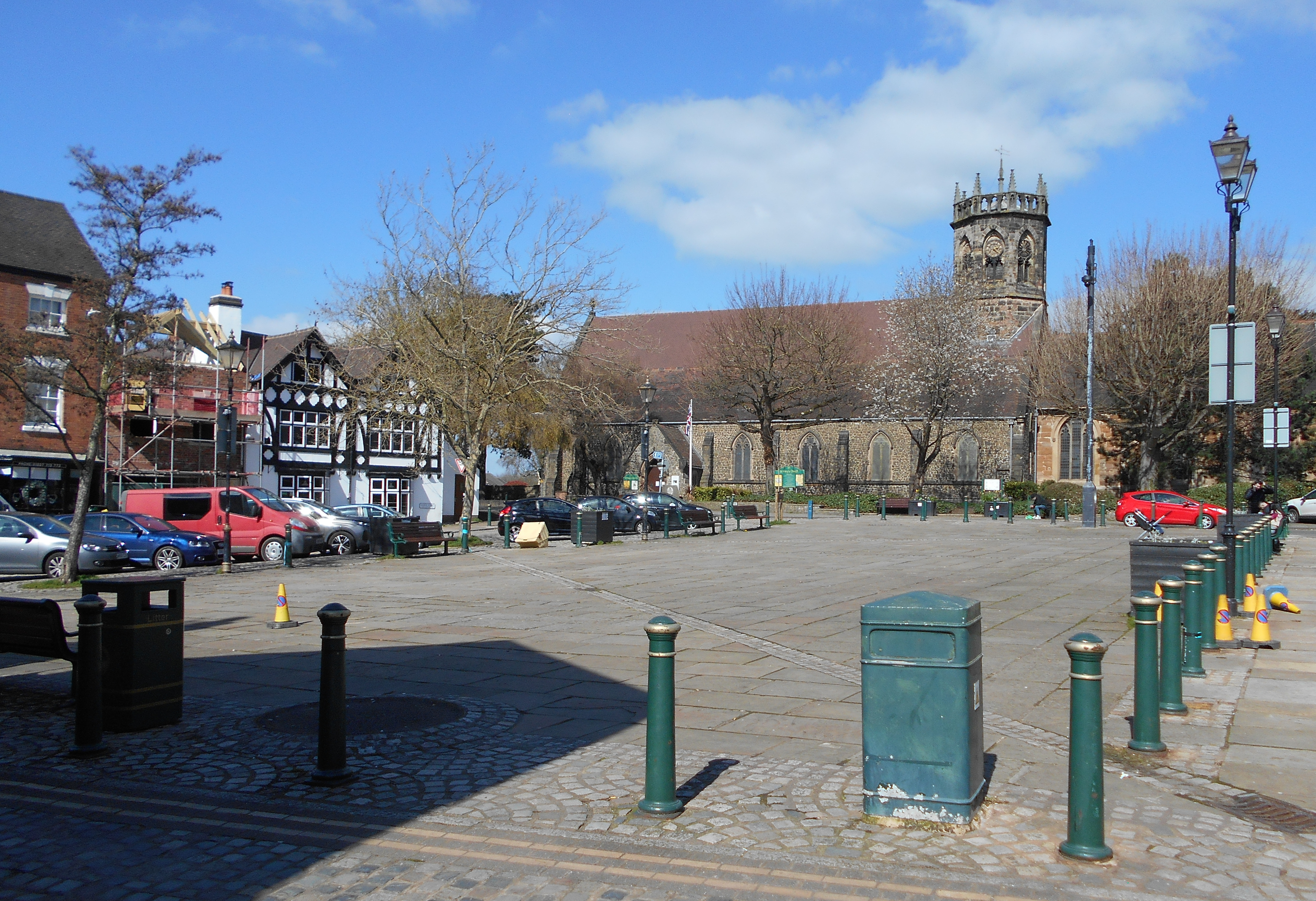
- Atherstone Market Square, looking towards St Mary's Church

- Location within Warwickshire
- Population: 9,212 (parish 2021); 11,259 (built-up area 2021)
- OS grid reference: SP3098
- District: North Warwickshire
- Shire county: Warwickshire
- Region: West Midlands
- Country: England
- Sovereign state: United Kingdom
- Post town: ATHERSTONE
- Postcode district: CV9
- Dialling code: 01827
- Police: Warwickshire
- Fire: Warwickshire
- Ambulance: West Midlands
- UK Parliament: North Warwickshire and Bedworth
- Website: www.atherstone-tc.gov.uk

Atherstone /ˈæðərstən/ is a market town and civil parish in the North Warwickshire district of Warwickshire, England. Located in the far north of the county, Atherstone is on the A5 national route, and is adjacent to the border with Leicestershire which is here formed by the River Anker. It is situated between the larger towns of Tamworth and Nuneaton. Atherstone is the administrative centre of the North Warwickshire district, with the offices of North Warwickshire Borough Council located in the town.

Atherstone has a local tradition of holding an annual Shrove Tuesday Ball Game in the streets, which has been played annually for over 800 years since 1199.

In the 2021 census the population of the civil parish of Atherstone was at 9,212. The population of the larger built-up area which includes the adjoining village of Mancetter was 11,259.

== History ==
=== Roman ===
Atherstone has a long history dating back to Roman times: The Roman road, the Watling Street (most of which later became part of the A5) ran through what is now Atherstone, and an important defended Roman settlement named Manduessedum existed at Mancetter near the site of modern-day Atherstone. It is widely believed that the forces of the rebel Queen Boudica were defeated in their final battle against the Romans at a location near Manduessedum in around AD 60. This was suggested as the most likely location of the battle by among others, the eminent archaeologist Graham Webster, although no firm evidence has emerged to confirm this to be the case.

=== Medieval ===
The Domesday Book of 1086, records that Atherstone (then named Aderestone) was held by Countess Godiva. The name likely originated from the Old English Aedelred's tun 'tun' meaning farmstead or town. After the Norman Conquest, the manor of Atherstone was given to Hugh Lupus, Earl of Chester who bestowed it to the monks of Bec Abbey of Normandy. In 1246 the monks of the Abbey obtained a charter from Henry III to hold a weekly market at Atherstone, thus transforming the settlement into a market town. In the 14th century, the town flourished, and Ralph Basset founded a house of Augustinian friars here in 1375, although this never became very important.

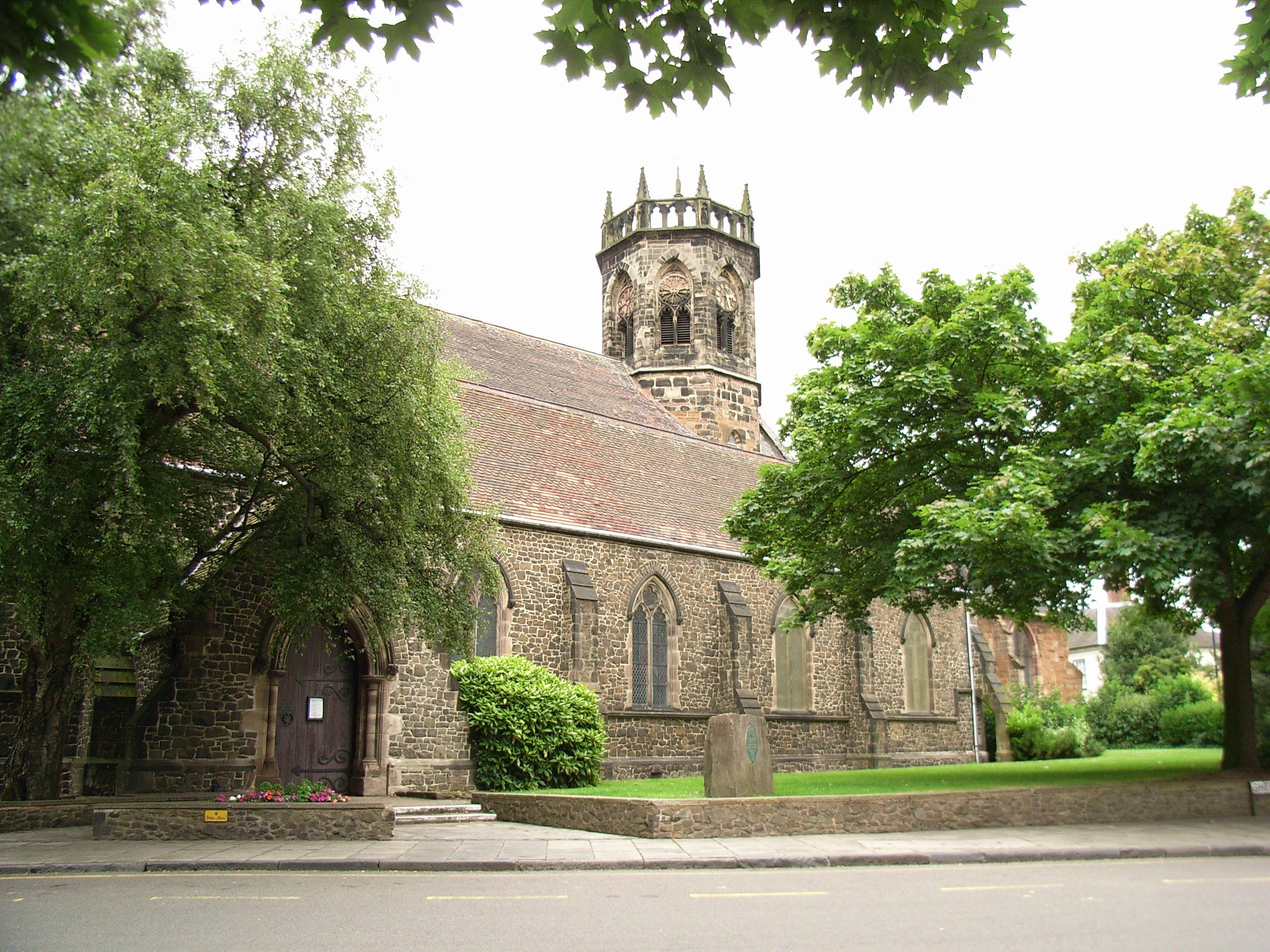
St Mary's Church

The ancient St Mary's Church in Atherstone dates from the early 12th century. The chapel was granted to Henry Cartwright in 1542, then left abandoned and neglected until 1692 when Samuel Bracebridge settled a yearly sum for the parson of Mancetter to preach there every other Sunday in the winter season. After this, St. Mary's Chapel seems to have experienced something of a revival. Its square tower being rebuilt in the fashionable "Gothic" style in 1782, and then was further redesigned in 1849 by Thomas Henry Wyatt and David Brandon.

==== Battle of Bosworth ====
On 21 August 1485, Henry Tudor, and up to 11,000 troops stayed at Atherstone the day before the Battle of Bosworth. Tudor was said to have stayed at the Three Tuns Inn in Long Street, while his troops camped in a meadow north of the parish church. Reputedly, whilst in Atherstone, Tudor secretly met with the powerful noblemen Thomas Stanley and his brother William Stanley who pledged their support for Tudor, which would prove decisive in the subsequent battle. The battle, which is believed to have occurred eight miles (thirteen kilometres) away near Market Bosworth in Leicestershire, resulted in Tudor's forces defeating those of King Richard III, enabling Tudor to claim the throne and become King Henry VII, establishing the Tudor dynasty. A theory exists, that the battle actually took place in the fields of Merevale above Atherstone, although this is not widely accepted. The main argument put in favour of this theory, is that financial reparations were made to Atherstone after the battle and not to Market Bosworth.

The battle has now been definitively located around the 'Fenn Lanes', which run from near Atherstone to Sutton Cheney. The battle site is NW of Stoke Golding, roughly halfway between Atherstone and Market Bosworth, and near the junction with the road running south from Market Bosworth.

=== Tudor period ===
In Tudor times, Atherstone was a thriving commercial centre for weaving and clothmaking. The town's favourable location laid out as a long ‘ribbon development’ along Watling Street, ensured its growth as a market town. While it remained an agricultural settlement in medieval times, attempts were made to encourage merchants and traders through the creation of burgage plots, a type of land tenure that provided them with special privileges. A manuscript discovered by Marjorie Morgan among the muniments of Cambridge's King's College (Ms. C9), refers to the creation of nine new burgage strips from land belonging to seven of the tenants in Atherstone vill.

By the late Tudor period Atherstone had become a centre for leatherworking, clothmaking, metalworking and brewing. Local sheep farmers and cattle graziers supplied wool and leather to local tanners and shoemakers (an industry that continued until the 1970s), while metalworkers, locksmiths and nailers fired their furnaces with local coal and the alemakers supplied thirsty palates on market days.

The surviving inventories from 16th century Mancetter provide a fascinating glimpse into Atherstone's Elizabethan merchants and traders, before the town was economically overshadowed by the bustling cities of Coventry and Birmingham. They show Atherstone at this time as a typical Midlands market town, taking full advantage of its location and agricultural setting.

=== 17th century to present ===
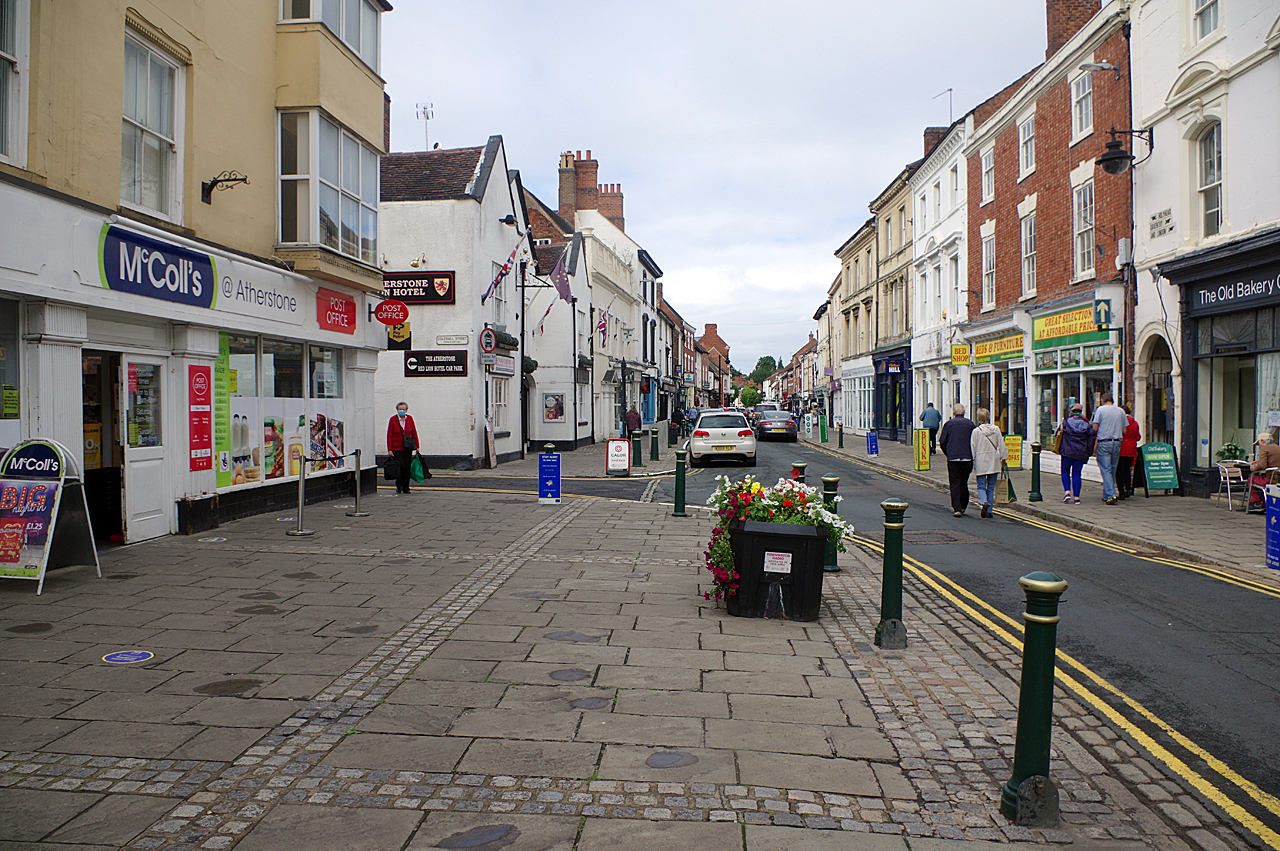
Long Street: Atherstone's main shopping street in the centre of the town, and also the historic route of Watling Street

The argument that Altherstone declined in favour of emerging cities in the 18th century has been challenged. In the 1750s, Altherstone was very much still a vibrant settlement, possessing both a book club and a bowling-green. It was regularly frequented by the leisure-seeking gentry, including Sir Roger Newdigate and his circle of friends.

The Coventry Canal reached Atherstone in 1769, and the railways arrived in 1847, with the opening of the Trent Valley Railway, upon which Atherstone has its station. These transport links helped the industrialisation of the town.

Atherstone was once an important hatting town, and became well known for its felt hat industry. The industry began in the 17th century and at its height in the early 20th century there were seven firms employing 3,000 people. Due to cheap imports and a decline in the wearing of hats, the trade had declined substantially by the 1970s with just three companies remaining, Denham & Hargrave Ltd, Vero & Everitt Ltd and Wilson & Stafford Ltd. The production of felt hats in the town ceased altogether with the closure of the Wilson & Stafford factory in 1999. As of 2018 the factory received the go-ahead to be redeveloped into canalside residential apartments. However, the remains of the town's last hat manufacturing site, on Coleshill Road, were scheduled for demolition in 2022, after the local council decided it could not be safely redeveloped for residential use.

== Governance ==
Atherstone is part of the parliamentary constituency of North Warwickshire and Bedworth. The current Member of Parliament (MP) for the area being Rachel Taylor of the Labour Party.

There are three tiers of local government covering Atherstone, at county level (Warwickshire County Council) district level (North Warwickshire Borough Council), which, since May 2023, has been under no overall control. And finally at town (parish) level (Atherstone Town Council), which has 15 councillors representing three wards.

== Geography ==
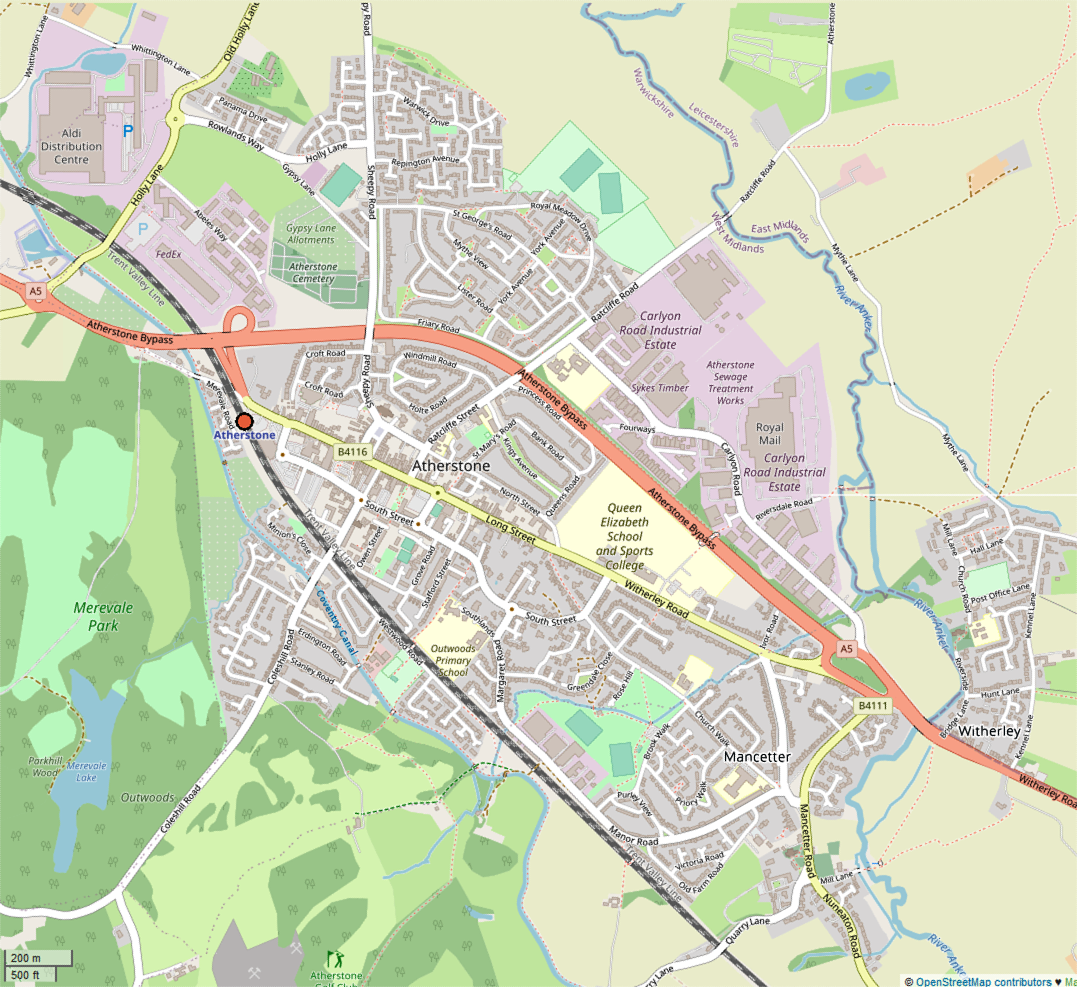
Map of Atherstone, Mancetter & Witherley

Atherstone is situated 6 miles (9.7 km) northwest of Nuneaton, 7 miles (11 km) southeast of Tamworth, 13 miles (21 km) north of Coventry, 16 miles (26 km) northeast of Birmingham, and 17 miles (27 km) west-southwest of Leicester. The village of Mancetter has become contiguous with Atherstone to the southeast, although it remains a separate civil parish. Atherstone is close to the River Anker which forms the boundary between Warwickshire and Leicestershire. The village of Witherley is located on the opposite bank of the river in neighbouring Leicestershire. Other nearby villages include Sheepy Magna, Ratcliffe Culey, Fenny Drayton, Grendon, Dordon, Baxterley, Baddesley Ensor and Hartshill. The town of Coleshill is to the southwest.

The A5 road (former Watling Street) historically ran through the town centre, but a dual carriageway bypass was opened in 1963.

Atherstone is one of the closest towns to the geographic centre of England, which since 2002 has been recognised as being at Lindley Hall Farm, around 3 miles (4.8 km) east of Atherstone, across the county border in Leicestershire.

== Economy ==
Atherstone used to be known for its hatting industry. In part due to its central location in the UK, Atherstone's economy has expanded rapidly since the 1980s, with several major companies such as 3M (1964) TNT (1987), Aldi (1990s) setting up their head office operations and/or national distribution centres in the town. The British Home Stores warehouse which had operated in the town for 40 years, closed in August 2016, It is now used by Royal Mail as a regional sorting office.

== Transport ==
Atherstone is on the main A5 national route and close to the M42 motorway.

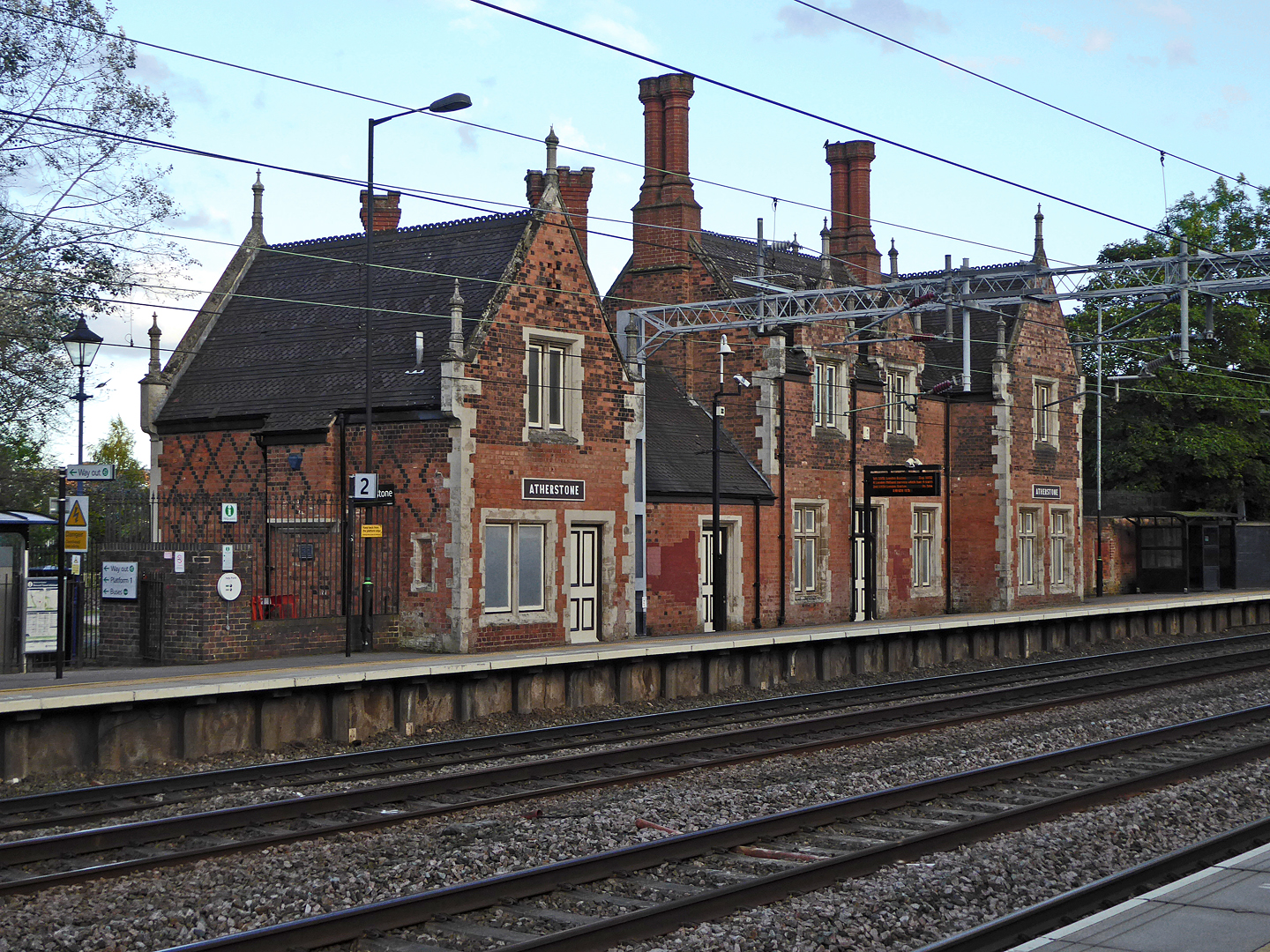
Atherstone railway station.

The Coventry Canal and a series of eleven locks runs through the town, as does the West Coast Main Line railway. Atherstone has its railway station on this line, with an hourly service 7 days a week to both London and Crewe via Stafford. The current level of service was introduced in 2008, and is a big improvement on the service two decades earlier there were only five trains a day, just going between Stafford and Rugby.

The historic station building, built in 1847, was under threat of demolition in the early 1980s. Thanks to a local group, the Railway and Steam Traction Society, listed status was obtained, with the building celebrating its 150th anniversary in 1997. Building work won a special Ian Allan conservation award. As of 2008, the railway station building is occupied by a local veterinary practice.

== Media ==
Local news and television programmes are provided by BBC West Midlands and ITV Central. Television signals are received from the Sutton Coldfield TV transmitter.

Local radio stations are BBC CWR, BBC Radio Leicester can also be received, Capital Midlands, Hits Radio Coventry & Warwickshire and Greatest Hits Radio Midlands.

The town is served by the local newspapers, Atherstone Herald and Tamworth Herald.

== Recreation ==
The major football team in the town is Atherstone Town, known as 'the Adders'. This is after the tradition which has Atherstone being a corruption of the name "Adders – stone". Their ground is located on Sheepy Road. Atherstone's team started out as Atherstone Town Football Club in 1887 but folded in 1979, from 1979 to 2003 Atherstone's football team was known as Atherstone United Football Club but folded again mid-season in 2003. The team then reverted to its previous name Atherstone Town Football Club. The club made the national headlines in October 2013 when during an FA Cup 3rd Qualifying round against Barrow A.F.C. crowd violence erupted during the first half when a small "minority" of Atherstone supporters ran across the pitch and attacked a number of Barrow supporters. The ringleaders and other participants of the crowd trouble were subsequently arrested, charged and sentenced to various jail terms. Since this incident the club has established itself as a family and community orientated club.

The rugby union team is Atherstone Rugby Football Club who play in the Warwickshire Two League. Their ground is situated on Ratcliffe Road. The same ground is shared by Atherstone Town Cricket Club, Atherstone Rangers Junior Football Club and is the home of Atherstone Adders Hockey Club, who play at the nearby Queen Elizabeth Academy.

Atherstone Leisure Complex is at the north end of Long Street and consists of a swimming pool and gym. Atherstone Memorial Hall is also part of the leisure complex.

=== Shrovetide Ball Game ===
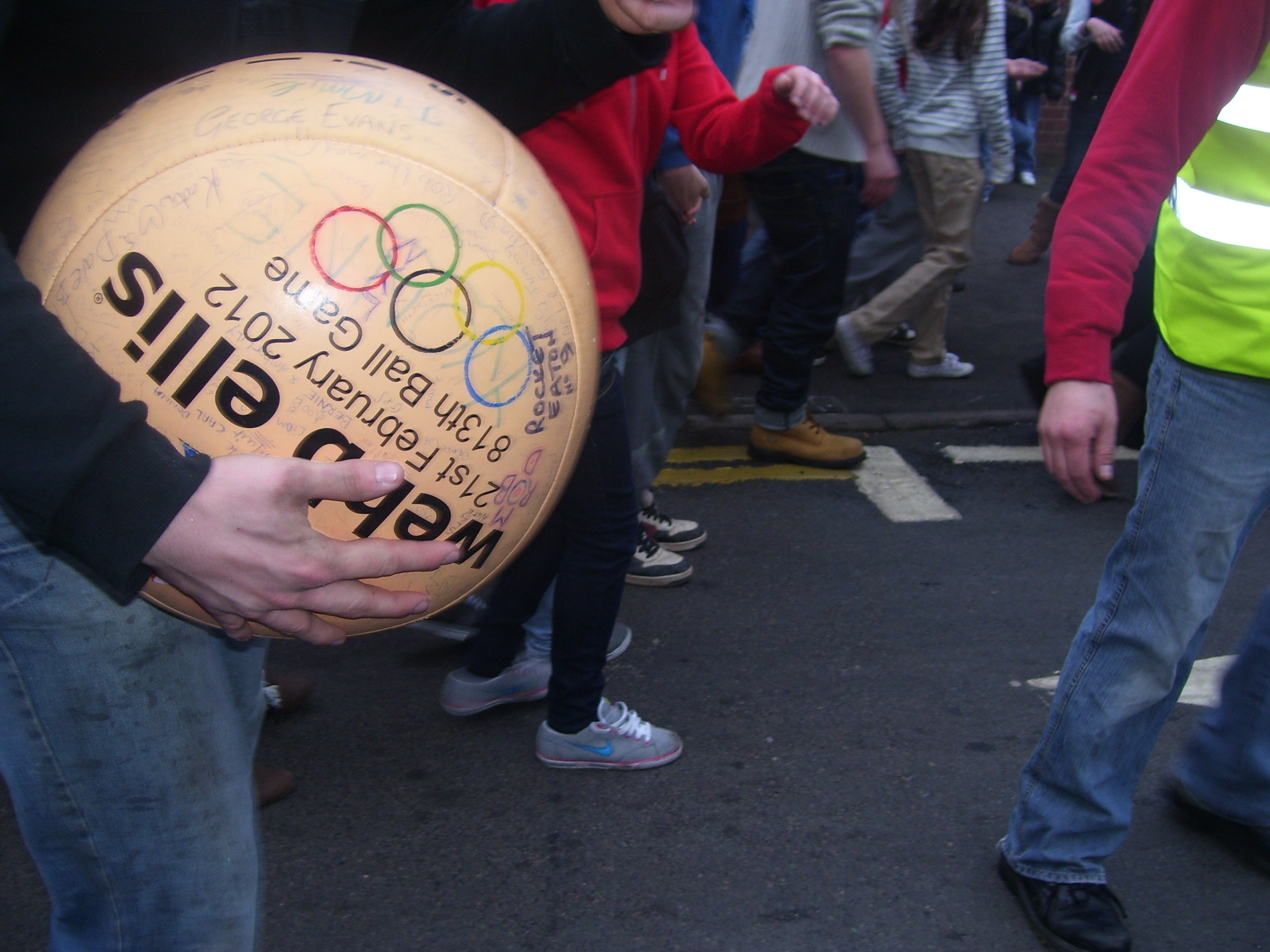
The ball played in the 813th Atherstone Ball game Shrove Tuesday 21 February 2012.

An annual tradition in Atherstone is the Shrove Tuesday Ball Game played on a public highway with large crowds. The game celebrated its 800th anniversary in 1999.

The game is a complete free-for-all played along Watling Street (the old Roman road) at the point where it forms the main street of Atherstone town. The ball is decorated with red, white and blue ribbons that are exchanged for money by who ever is able to obtain one and is made of thick leather to make it too heavy to kick far. The match starts at 3:00pm when the ball is thrown from the balcony of the local Conservative Club (since the closure of the local branch of Barclays Bank, from whose upper floor the ball was previously thrown, in 2019) and continues until about 5:00pm. However the ball may legitimately be deflated or hidden after 4:30pm. There are no teams and no goals, though in the last century the match was played between a team from Warwickshire and one from Leicestershire. There is only one rule: players are not allowed to kill one another. Whoever is able to hang onto the ball at the end of the game not only wins the game but is allowed to keep the ball as well. The game is controlled by a number of "marshalls" some of whom are former winners. Police are present but for the two hours the game is in progress stand back and allow the action to continue. Legend has it that many an old feud is settled on Ball Game day. This Shrove Tuesday ball game has been held annually since the early 12th century and is one of Atherstone's claims to fame. The 2019 edition of the game was noted for being extremely violent with several videos of the event being uploaded to social media. Event organisers disputed the accounts of violence as "nothing new".

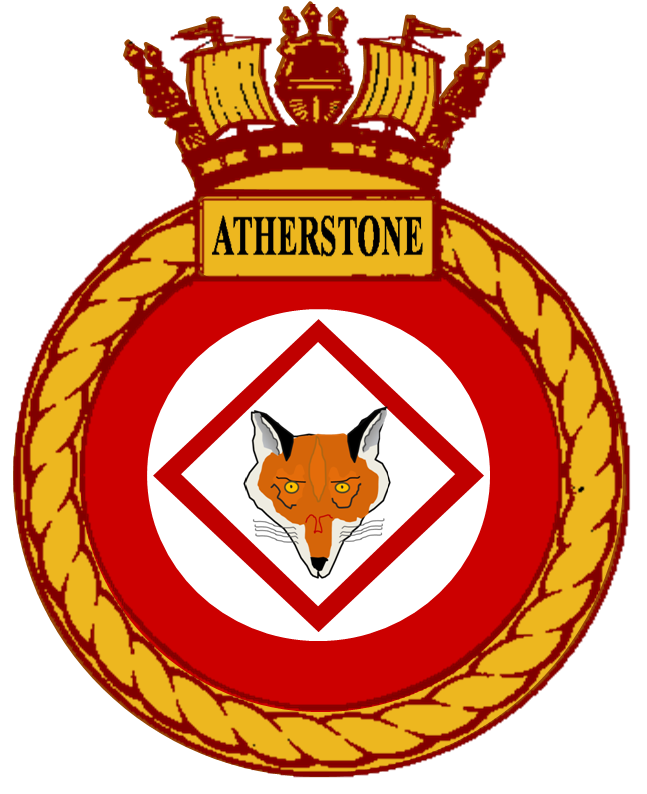
HMS Atherstone – Ship's badge

The origin of the game, in the reign of King John, is thought to have been a "Match of Gold that was played between the Warwickshire Lads and the Leicestershire Lads on Shrove Tuesday".

The 'ball' used is specially made each year and is 'thrown out' by a prominent sporting or show business personality. Shop windows are boarded-up and traffic is diverted on the afternoon whilst the game, in which hundreds of people take part, progresses along the town's main streets.

== Naval connections ==
Atherstone has strong naval connections. Three Royal Navy ships have been named HMS Atherstone after the town: the vessels were commissioned in 1916, 1939, and most recently, 1985.

== Education ==
Primary age schools in Atherstone include the Outwoods Primary School, the Racemeadow Primary Academy, and St Benedict's RC Primary Academy.

The Queen Elizabeth Academy is the state secondary school in the town.

== Notable people ==
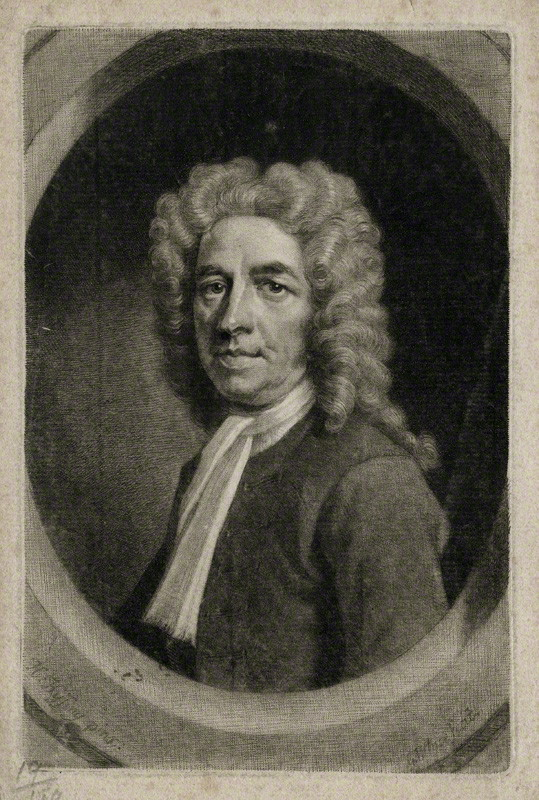
Abel Roper

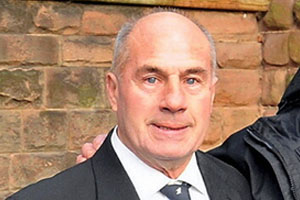
Les Green, 2010

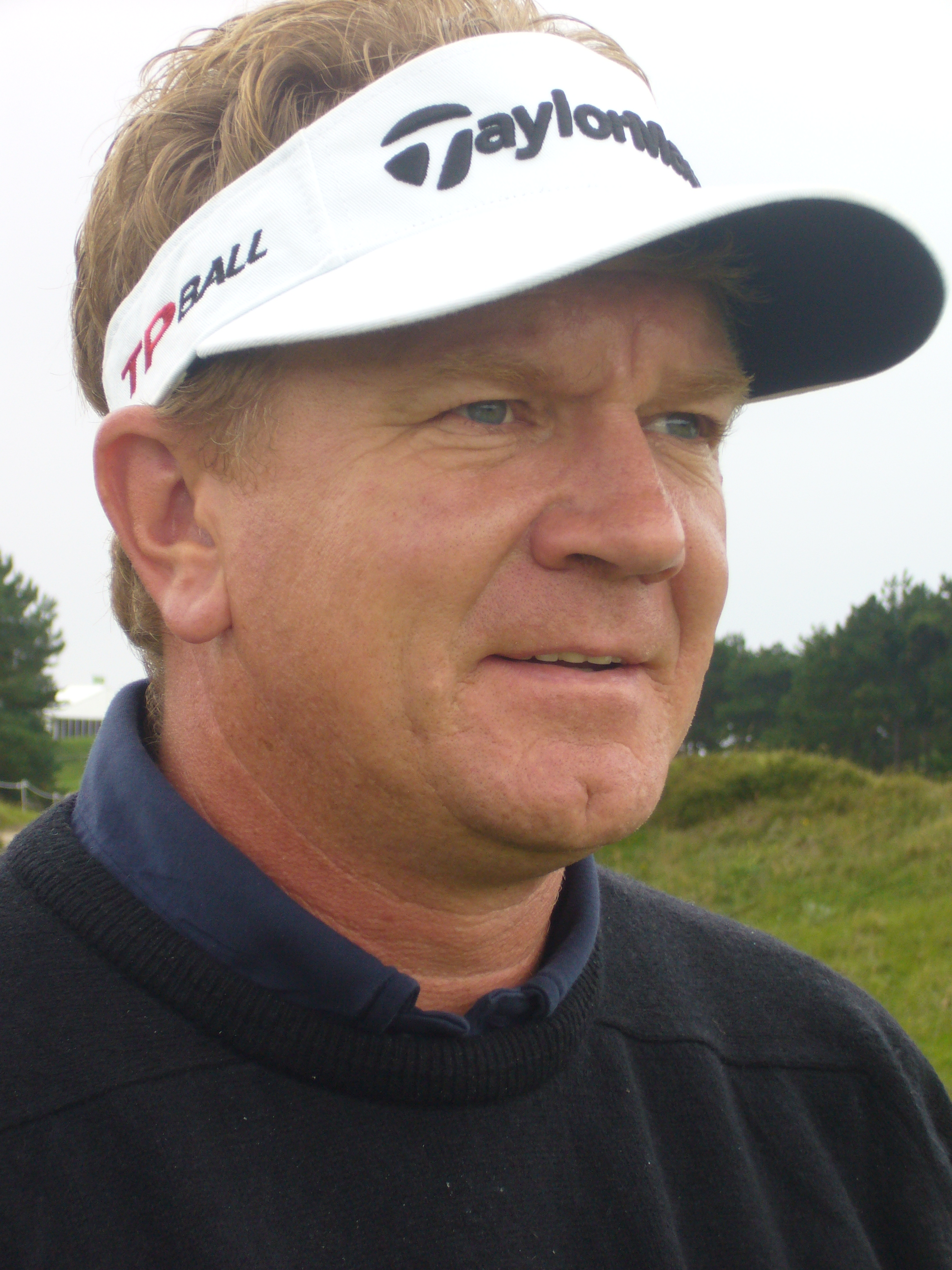
Paul Broadhurst, 2008

- Obadiah Grew (1607–1689) an English nonconformist minister.
- Abel Roper (1665–1726) an English journalist, who wrote in the Tory interest.
- William Stratford Dugdale (1800–1871) a British Tory politician and MP
- William Yolland (1810–1885) an English military surveyor, astronomer and engineer and Britain's Chief Inspector of Railways.
- Prof Herbert R. Spencer (1860–1941) a professor of obstetrics
- Sir John Bretland Farmer (1865–1944) a British botanist
- Rhoda Sutherland (1907–1989) an academic of the French language, Old French and Old Provençal
- Mary Fox (1922–2005) an artist
- Bill Olner (1942–2020) a British Labour Party politician, MP for Nuneaton 1992–2010
- Leigh Lawson (born 1945) a British film and stage actor, director and writer
- Sara Thornton (born 1954/1955) local resident convicted and later acquitted of murdering her violent and alcoholic husband
- Andy Green (born 1962) a British RAF fighter pilot and World Land Speed Record holder

=== Sport ===
- Charlie Wilson (1895–1971) an English footballer who played over 150 games for Stoke City
- Arthur Johnson (1903–1987) an English professional footballer
- Jack Barnes (1908–2008) an English pro footballer, also played for Atherstone Town F.C.
- Bernard Hunt (1930–2013) an English professional golfer
- Johnny Schofield (1931–2006) an English footballer who played as goalkeeper, later he ran an off-licence in Atherstone
- Frank Upton (1934–2011) an English professional football player and manager
- Les Green (1941–2012) an English footballer and manager
- Paul Broadhurst (born 1965) an English professional golfer
- Steve Webster (born 1975) an English professional golfer

== See also ==
- Atherstone on Stour, a village in Warwickshire
- HMS Atherstone
- Atherstone Hunt
- Witherley
