= 2007 Warwickshire warehouse fire =

Fire in Warwickshire, England

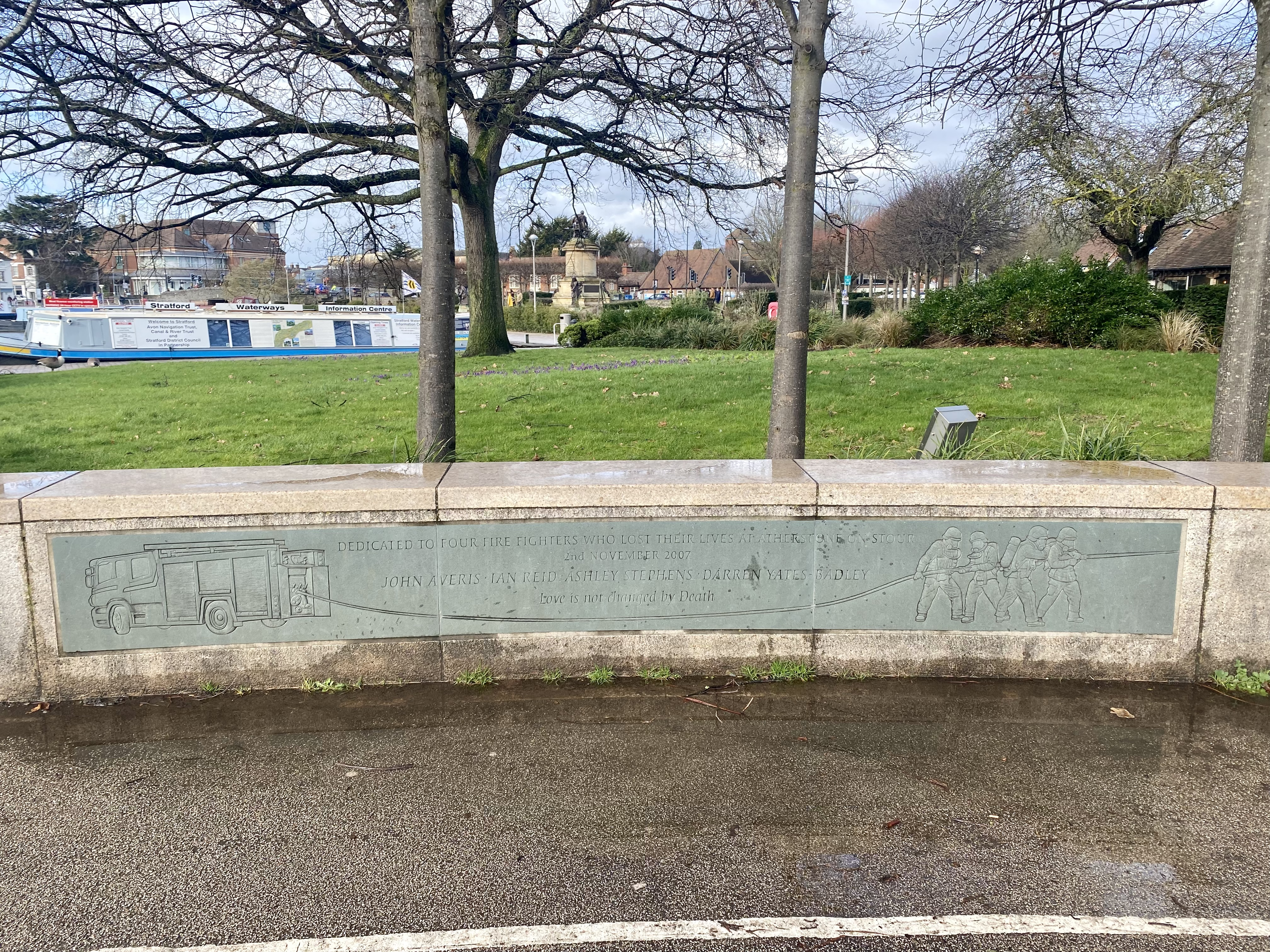
- The memorial in Bancroft Gardens in Stratford-upon-Avon
- Venue: Atherstone Industrial Estate
- Location: Atherstone on Stour, Warwickshire, England; 52.1592°N 1.6923°W
- Cause: Undetermined
- Deaths: 4
- Coroner: Sean McGovern

On 2 November 2007 a fire occurred at a warehouse near the village of Atherstone on Stour in Warwickshire, England. Four firefighters from the Warwickshire Fire and Rescue Service were killed, the largest loss of life for a fire brigade in the United Kingdom in 35 years.

In 2012, three of their commanding officers were acquitted of manslaughter charges and Warwickshire County Council was fined for failing to ensure safety at work.

== The fire ==
At approximately 17:20 GMT on 2 November 2007, a fire broke out in a vegetable packing plant at Atherstone Industrial Estate in Atherstone on Stour, Warwickshire.

Approximately 100 firefighters from Warwickshire Fire and Rescue Service attended, arriving at 17:51. Four were reported missing after entering the premises; one, Ian Reid, was rescued but died later in hospital. The bodies of John Averis, Ashley Stephens and Darren Yates-Badley were recovered on 6 November.

== Aftermath ==
The probable cause was determined to be a naked flame, but the source was not determined. The fire was suspected to be arson; four people arrested in May 2009 were later released without charge through insufficient evidence.

On 28 February 2011, it was announced that three officers from the Warwickshire Fire and Rescue Service would face charges of manslaughter by gross negligence over the deaths.

On 6 May 2011, the three officers appeared at the Warwickshire Justice Centre to face the charges. Warwickshire County Council also faced a charge under the Health and Safety at Work Act of failing to ensure the safety of its employees. They were all granted unconditional bail. It was agreed both cases would be dealt with in the Crown Court.

A hearing took place on 20 January 2012 at Wolverhampton Crown Court at which Warwickshire County Council entered a guilty plea to failing to ensure the health and safety of its employees.

On 18 April 2012, the three fire officers – Timothy Woodward, Adrian Ashley and Paul Simmons – appeared in court charged with manslaughter by gross negligence. The trial started at Stafford Crown Court on 20 April 2012; Simmons was acquitted on 21 May and Woodward and Ashley were found not guilty on 30 May.

Warwickshire County Council was fined £30,000 in December 2012.

The incident was the most deadly since seven firefighters died while fighting a fire at a Glasgow warehouse in 1972.
