= Preston on Stour =

Village and civil parish in Warwickshire, England

Coordinates: 52°08′50″N 1°42′15″W

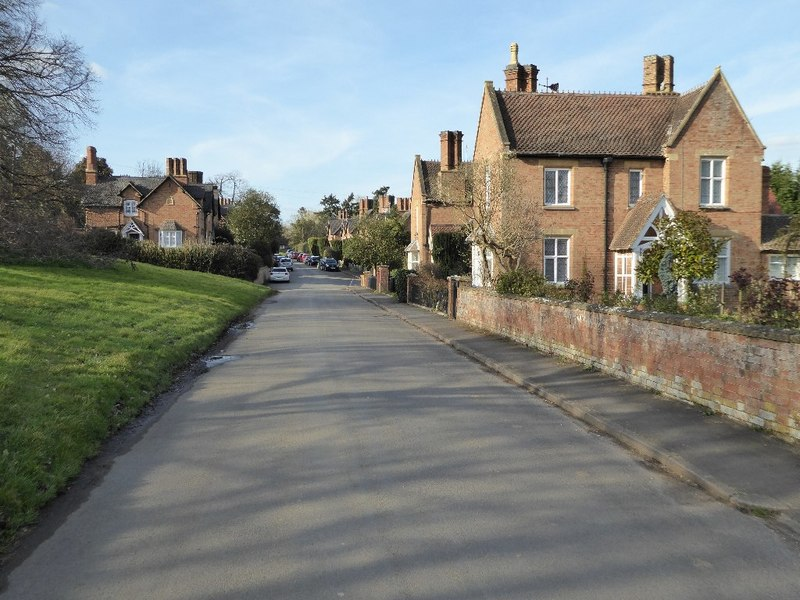
- Road entering Preston on Stour

- Location within Warwickshire
- Population: 244 (2011 census)
- District: Stratford-on-Avon
- Shire county: Warwickshire
- Region: West Midlands
- Country: England
- Sovereign state: United Kingdom
- Post town: Stratford-upon-Avon
- Postcode district: CV37
- Police: Warwickshire
- Fire: Warwickshire
- Ambulance: West Midlands
- UK Parliament: Stratford-on-Avon

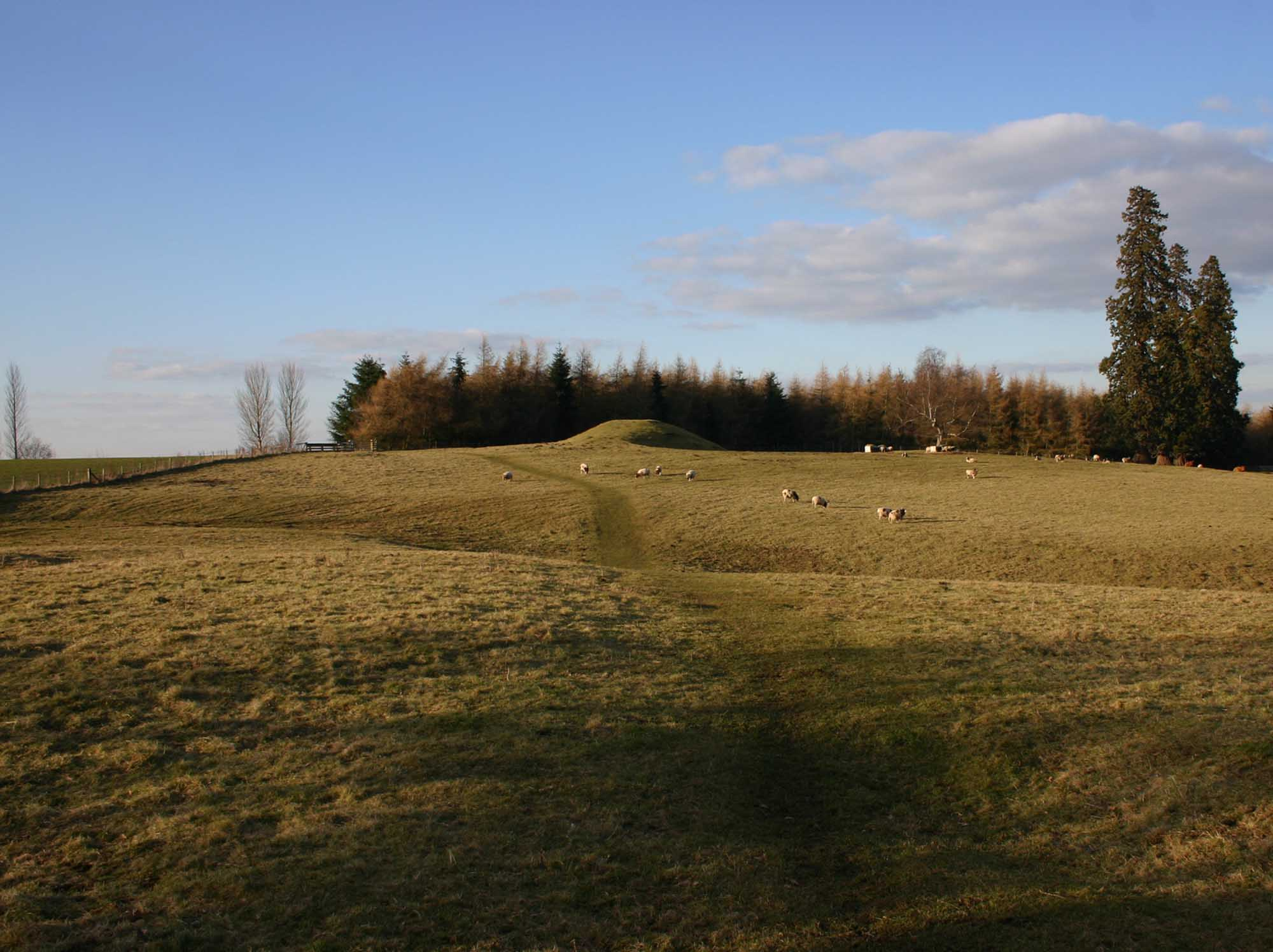
Footpath to Atherstone on Stour, view north along the footpath shortly after leaving Preston on Stour.

Preston on Stour is a village and civil parish in Warwickshire, England.

== History ==
It is situated some 3 1/2 miles (5.6 km) south of the town of Stratford-upon-Avon. The population of the civil parish as at the 2011 census was 244. As its name suggests, the village stands on the River Stour, which flows northward, just east of the village centre. The A3400 main road parallels the river about 2/3 mile (1.1 km) further east. To the east of the village lies the country estate of Alscot Park with its Grade I listed Georgian mansion house. Historically, Preston was a part of the county of Gloucestershire, but the parish was transferred to Warwickshire on 1 April 1931. The village church is dedicated to Saint Mary. The village formerly had a Junior school and Infant school but this was closed in 1974.

== Nearby ==
The children's television show Teletubbies was filmed at Wimpstone, about 1 mile (1.6 km) south of the village.
