= Karen Howes =

British interior designer (born 1962)

Karen Howes (born 15 May 1962) is a British interior designer based in London.

In 1993, Howes co-founded the interior design firm Taylor Howes. Her interest in design began after visiting Mary Fox's shop. Her work sometimes includes book-buying briefs. Her curated bookshelves usually feature non-fiction titles.

In 2004, she designed a penthouse bathroom in Battersea that featured a glass-framed bath with a view of London's River Thames.
