= HMS Atherstone =

Three ships of the Royal Navy have been named HMS Atherstone after the town of Atherstone in Warwickshire, or after its hunt:

- HMS Atherstone (1916), launched in 1916, was a Racecourse-class minesweeper that served in World War I.
- HMS Atherstone (L05), launched in 1939, was a Hunt-class destroyer that served in World War II.
- HMS Atherstone (M38), launched in 1985, was a Hunt-class mine countermeasures vessel.
