= Jack Barnes (English footballer) =

English footballer

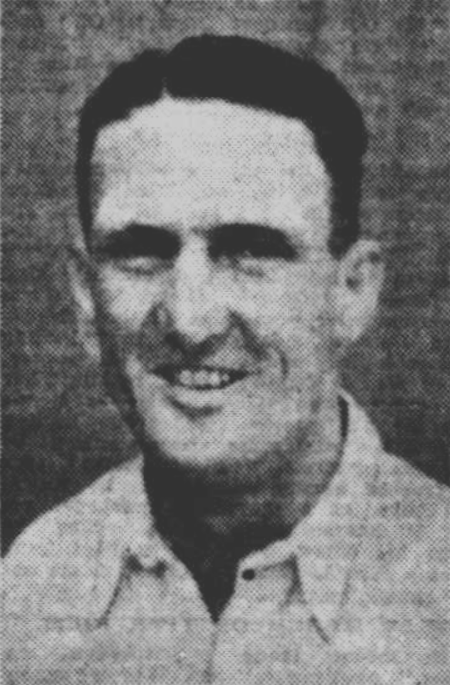

Personal information
- Full name: John Benjamin Barnes
- Date of birth: 28 April 1908
- Place of birth: Atherstone, Warwickshire, England
- Date of death: 1 April 2008 (aged 99)
- Place of death: Coleshill, Warwickshire, England
- Height: 5 ft 8 in (1.73 m)
- Position: Outside forward

Youth career
- Atherstone Town

Senior career*
Years	Team	Apps	(Gls)
1928–1929	Coventry City	8	(0)
1929–1931	Walsall	68	(18)
1931–1933	Watford	75	(11)
1933–1934	Exeter City	18	(1)
1934–1935	York City	15	(1)
1935–?	Atherstone Town	?	(?)
- * Club domestic league appearances and goals

John Benjamin Barnes (28 April 1908 – 1 April 2008) was an English footballer who played as an outside left for several Football League clubs, as well as for non-League side Atherstone Town.

== Early life ==
Born in Atherstone, Warwickshire, Barnes left school at 12, to help provide for his family. He worked in various coal mines, as well as a bakery. His football career began as an amateur for Atherstone Town. He signed on professional terms for Coventry City in March 1928.

== Professional career ==
Barnes played eight consecutive games for Coventry at the end of the 1927–28 season. One of these matches—a 2–2 draw with Crystal Palace—was the lowest attendance in Coventry's history, attracting 2,059 spectators. After being confined to Coventry's reserves the following season, Barnes joined Walsall in June 1929. He stayed there for two years, scoring 18 goals in 68 appearances as they recorded consecutive 17th-placed finishes in the Third Division South. In July 1931 he joined Watford, managed by Neil McBain. After 83 games and 11 goals for the Vicarage Road based club, he was transfer listed for an asking price of £300, before eventually joining Exeter City for a third of that figure. His stay in Exeter lasted just one season, before he joined what would be his last professional club, York City, in August 1934. Barnes played 15 York City games, scoring once, before retiring from professional football due to a foot injury. Barnes rejoined first club Atherstone Town as an amateur in 1935.

== After football ==
Following his retirement, Barnes worked in a munitions factory during the Second World War, and later did work as a painter/decorator, plumber and tanner. His family included wife Nancy, daughter Janet (who later had two children Angela and Paul), and he lived to see all four of his grandchildren, Naomi, Niall, Jenna, and Matthew. Apart from football, Barnes' sporting interests included golf, boxing, cricket, swimming and greyhound racing. Barnes considered becoming a professional golfer in 1938, and although he did not pursue this possibility, he continued playing until the age of 93. Barnes died from Alzheimer's disease in a nursing home in Coleshill, Warwickshire, only 27 days before his 100th birthday. Prior to his death, he was the oldest surviving former Football League player and one of the last surviving professional footballers to have played before World War II.
