= St Mary's Church, Atherstone =

St Mary’s Church
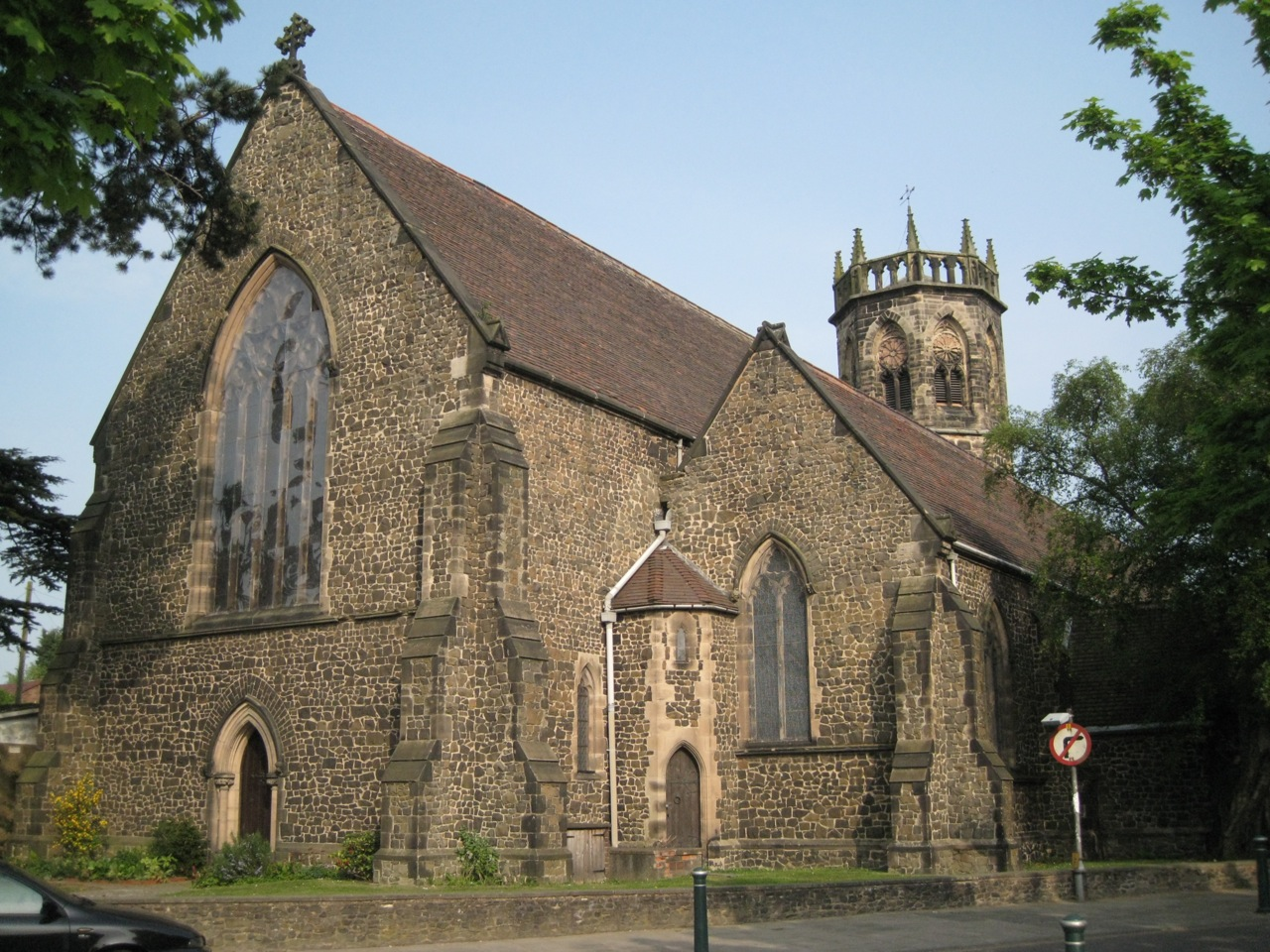
- St Mary’s Church, Atherstone
- St Mary’s Church
- 52°34′42.96″N 01°32′46.32″W
- OS grid reference: SP 30844 97969
- Country: England
- Denomination: Church of England
- Churchmanship: Broad Church
- Website: stmarysatherstone.co.uk

History
- Status: Parish church

Architecture
- Functional status: active
- Style: Perpendicular Gothic chancel, Gothic Revival nave and aisles
- Completed: C12 (possible origins), C13/14, C17, C18

Specifications
- Materials: red sandstone, sandstone ashlar, Hartshill granite rubble

Administration
- Diocese: Diocese of Coventry
- Parish: Atherstone

Listed Building – Grade II*
- Official name: Church of St Mary
- Designated: 25 March 1968
- Reference no.: 1365164

St Mary's Church is a Grade II* listed parish church in Atherstone, Warwickshire, England.

The stonework in the tower is in poor condition and hence the church is listed on Historic England's Heritage at Risk Register.

== History ==
The ancient St Mary's Chapel in Atherstone originated in the early 12th century, when the monks of Bec Abbey made a donation of 12 acres (4.9 ha) to a house of friars and hermits. However, the only survival from this time is a reset Norman doorway brought from the former church of Baddesley Ensor. Around 1375, this community was replaced by Atherstone Priory, a house of Augustinian friars. The friars rebuilt the church shortly after, with a Perpendicular Gothic chancel and a tower over a central 'walking place'. The font also survives from around this time, and is decorated with the Symbols of the Passion and the Evangelists.

The priory was dissolved in the Dissolution of the Monasteries in the 1530s, and the friars' buildings were demolished. The church survived in parochial use, though its chancel was converted to serve as school founded by Sir William Devereux. According to Nichols, the chapel was granted to Henry Cartwright in 1542, then left abandoned and neglected until 1692, when Samuel Bracebridge settled a yearly sum for the parson of Mancetter to preach there every other Sunday in the winter season.

Over the 18th and 19th centuries, the church was gradually restored and rebuilt. Its square tower was rebuilt in the fashionable “Gothic” style in 1782. The architectural drawing of the chapel made by Jacob Schnebbelie in 1790 prompted Nichols to assert that “the new tower provides a good effect." St Mary's was further redesigned in 1849 by Thomas Henry Wyatt and David Brandon, with a large new aisled nave of five bays being built. The chapel was restored to be used as a chancel in 1888.

== Organ ==
The first record of an organ is in 1852, when an instrument by Holdich was installed. This was replaced in 1898, when an organ by Henry Jones and Sons was obtained from Christ Church, South Banbury. A specification of the organ can be found on the National Pipe Organ Register.
