= RAF Atherstone =

Former RAF base in Warwickshire, England

RAF Atherstone RAF Stratford
- Atherstone on Stour, Warwickshire in England
- A section of perimeter track at the airfield

Site information
- Type: Satellite station
- Code: NF
- Owner: Air Ministry
- Operator: Royal Air Force
- Controlled by: RAF Bomber Command * No. 6 (T) Group RAF * No. 91 (OTU) Group RAF

Location
- Shown within Warwickshire RAF Atherstone (the United Kingdom)
- Coordinates: 52°9′40″N 001°41′12″W

Site history
- Built: 1940
- In use: July 1941 – November 1945
- Battles/wars: Second World War

Airfield information
- Elevation: 116 metres (381 ft) AMSL
Runways
| Direction | Length and surface |
|---|---|
| 02/20 | 1,480 metres (4,856 ft) Concrete |
| 06/24 | 1,220 metres (4,003 ft) Concrete |
| 14/32 | 1,080 metres (3,543 ft) Concrete |

RAF Atherstone was a former Royal Air Force satellite station located 2.25 miles (3.62 km) south of Stratford-upon-Avon, Warwickshire, England, 7.5 miles (12.1 km) north-west of Shipston on Stour.

The airfield opened in 1941 when it was used by No. 22 Operational Training Unit RAF as a satellite from RAF Wellesbourne Mountford. Through its life the airfield was home to a number of units before closing in 1945. However local sources state that the airfield was wrongly sited because it was directly on the flightpath from Wellesbourne and also the whole airfield was on hill, the main runway having quite a steep slope.

Atherstone had its name changed during operations when, in May 1942, it became RAF Stratford.

== Posted units ==
The authorisation for a satellite for No. 22 Operational Training Unit RAF (OTU) was given on 18 June 1940 yet it took over a year until 5 July 1941 that the station was finally opened by an advance party from RAF Wellesbourne Mountford with their Vickers Wellingtons. During 1942 the station's name was changed from RAF Atherstone to RAF Stratford. This is nothing to do with airfields with the same name. The airfield is at Atherstone on Stour, a sparsely populated rural parish, too small to appear on many maps and which never had a railway station. The nearest station is Stratford-on-Avon on the GWR Birmingham to Bristol line. The RAF dropped the "on-Stour" from the name and don't seem to have realised there is a large town, 40 miles away in North Warwickshire (near to Tamworth in Staffordshire) called Atherstone. It is on the maps and does have a station and not surprisingly many servicemen posted to Atherstone, Warwickshire ended up at the wrong place. This Atherstone is on the LMSR west coast main line, and to get to Stratford involves a circuitous journey of three separate trains and a walk across Birmingham between the LMS & GWR stations, probably a half days travel. When it is borne in mind that nearly 90% of routine service personnel movements were by rail and OTUs had substantial intakes of trainees once a fortnight this presented a problem. The RAF eventually realised their mistake and the airfield was renamed after the local railway station.

No. 312 Ferry Training Unit (FTU) flying Wellingtons used the airfield for just under eight months between 24 April 1943 and 17 December 1943 with the unit located at Wellesbourne Mountford with RAF Gaydon and Stratford used as a satellite.

However, on 7 March 1944 the airfield was transferred back to No. 22 OTU because the unit now had 81 Wellington III/X's with 33 of these coming from No. 23 OTU which had disbanded on 7 March 1944. Although before long No. 22 OTU had left and the station came under control from the Signals Flying Unit RAF from RAF Honiley but not long after flying ceased at Stratford and the station was placed on a care and maintenance basis.

The Ground Controlled Approach Squadron RAF was also here at some point under the control of the Signals Flying Unit.

== Accidents and incidents ==
During life as a RAF training airfield accidents were not far away, with a number of airmen killed during training.

| Date | Incident | Reference |
|---|---|---|
| 23 April 1944 | Vickers Wellington BK541 of No. 22 Operational Training Unit RAF (OTU) crashed on overshoot following engine failure. | |
| 11 June 1944 | Wellington BK186 of 22 OTU had to crash land after an engine failure. | |
| 8 December 1944 | Wellington LN845 –C of No. 11 Operational Training Unit RAF overshot a forced landing and ran onto the railway at the end of the runway. The aircraft was only lightly damaged until it was hit by a train. | |
| 19 October 1945 | Wellington PF882 of the Signals Flying Unit RAF overshot landing and ran into the railway embankment. | |

== Current use ==
Today the airfield is home to a small number of warehouses however the original basic layout can still be made out, including the runways and a large amount of the perimeter track which used to connect the runways with the dispersal hard standings and the technical site.

The airfield was also the site of the 2007 Warwickshire warehouse fire in which four firemen died.

At its peak there were over 1650 service men and women stationed here as well as civilian workers. At one time this OTU operated 81 Vickers Wellingtons, probably some Avro Ansons and a target towing flight with six Miles Martinets.
