= The Queen Elizabeth Academy =

Secondary school in Warwickshire, England

Location
- Witherley Road; Atherstone, Warwickshire, CV9 1LZ; England
- Coordinates: 52.5742°N 1.5331°W

Information
- Type: Academy
- Local authority: Warwickshire County Council
- Department for Education URN: 139937 Tables
- Ofsted: Reports
- Principal: N. Harding
- Gender: Coeducational
- Age: 11 to 16
- Enrolment: 675 (approx.)
- Colour: Navy blue
- Website: https://tqea.attrust.org.uk/

The Queen Elizabeth Academy (formerly Queen Elizabeth School) is a mixed secondary school with academy status. It is located on Witherley Road, Atherstone, Warwickshire, England; its principal is Neil Harding. The school is dependent on the four values of pride, endeavour, kindness, and resilience.
