= Atherstone Ball Game =

Annual medieval football game played in Atherstone, England

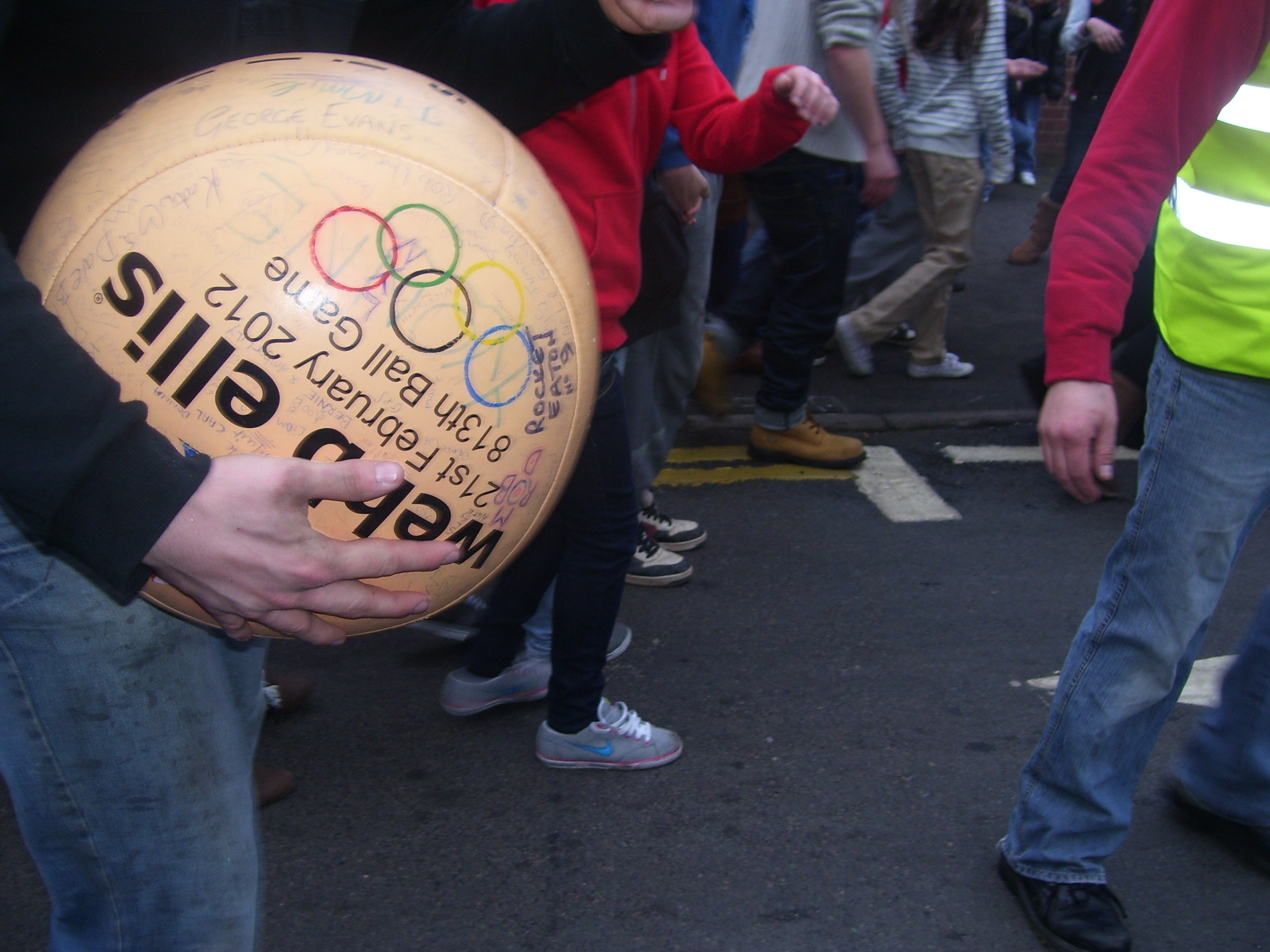
The ball played in the 813th Atherstone Ball game on Shrove Tuesday in 2012.

The Atherstone Ball Game is a "medieval football" game played annually on Shrove Tuesday in the English town of Atherstone, Warwickshire. The game honours a match played between Leicestershire and Warwickshire in 1199, when teams competed for a bag of gold, and which was won by Warwickshire. At one time similar events were held in many towns throughout England, but Atherstone's is now one of only three such games that are still played each year at Shrovetide, the others being the Royal Shrovetide Football match held in Ashbourne, Derbyshire, and The Alnwick Shrovetide Football Match in Alnwick, Northumberland.

== Overview ==
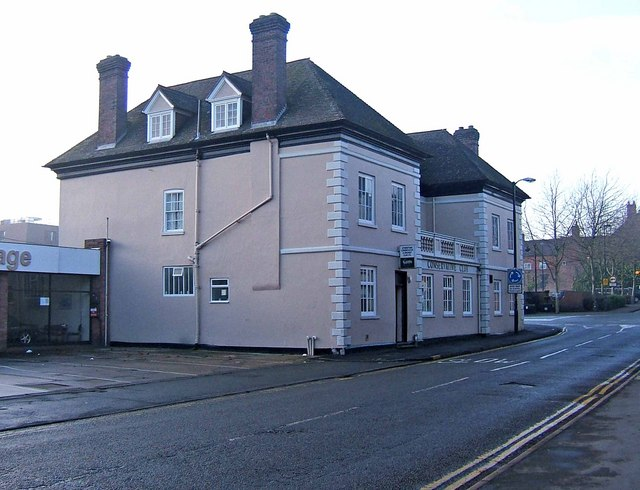
Atherstone Conservative Club in Long Street (known as the Connie) has been used as the venue from which the ball is thrown to commence the game

The game is an annual event played in Atherstone each Shrove Tuesday. Shops in the town are boarded up in preparation for its staging, while local children are allowed to leave school early on that day. The two-hour game is played in the town's main street, Long Street, and sees groups of players compete for possession of a giant ball that is specially made for the occasion. The match is usually started at 3:00 pm on Shrove Tuesday by a celebrity guest, usually someone associated with the area, who is invited to throw the ball from the upstairs of a building on Long Street. (Note: The Atherstone branch of Barclays Bank was used until its closure in 2019; the Conservative Club (known locally as the Connie) was then selected as a replacement venue to start the game, beginning in 2020. The upstairs window of Mark Webster's Estate Agents was used in 2024.)

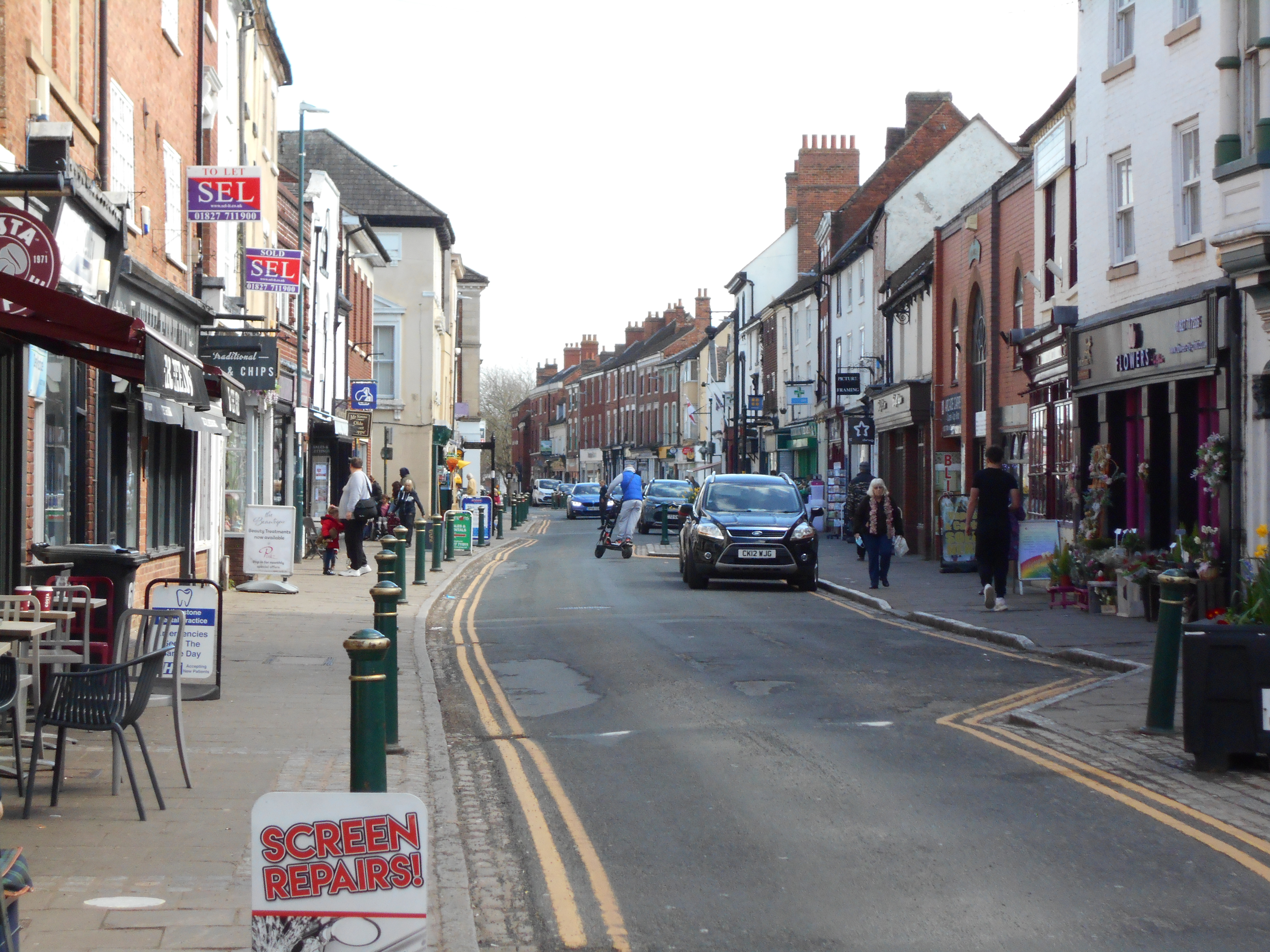
Long Street, where the game takes place.

The game itself has few rules, two being that play is restricted to Long Street and participants are not allowed to kill anyone. The winner is declared at 5:00 pm, the title going to the person who has possession of the ball when the whistle sounds. Ahead of the game itself, sweets and pennies are thrown to local children. The ball is decorated with ribbons before the game, and prizes are also awarded to anyone who gets hold of one, as well as to the person who gets the golden penny, thrown into the crowd shortly before the game commences. The ribbons are usually red, white and blue to represent the colours of the Union Flag, but other coloured ribbons have appeared from time to time. (Note: A black ribbon was added to honour George Cheshire, whose family won the game at least 12 times during the 1930s and 1940s, and who died in 1941; and in 1995 to honour Bertie Ford, a chairman of the Ball Game Committee, who had recently died. A gold ribbon was added in 1999 to celebrate the game's 800th anniversary.)

Gameplay can become quite intense as players compete to keep hold of the ball, with clothes torn off and occasional violence. The New Zealand Herald has described it as "combining all the best aspects of the UFC, volleyball and Gloucester's famous cheese wheel chase". The event is policed by officers from Warwickshire Police, while members of West Midlands Ambulance Service are on standby to treat any injuries.

Famous people who have started the game include those from the worlds of sport, acting and television. Among those to throw the ball out to the crowd are rugby player Wally Holmes in 1953, actor Sid James in 1963, comedian Jimmy Tarbuck in 1968, comedian Larry Grayson in 1976, former Aston Villa manager Brian Little in 1985 and 2019, soul-singer Edwin Starr in 1994, footballer Gordon Banks in 1995, television newsreader Llewella Bailey in 2000, and actress Annette Badland in 2017. Singer George Formby was also pictured at the game in 1937. The 2020 game had two personalities to launch proceedings, former Coventry City footballers Dave Bennett and Kirk Stephens. The 2024 game was started by comedian Josh Pugh, himself a native of Atherstone.

== History ==
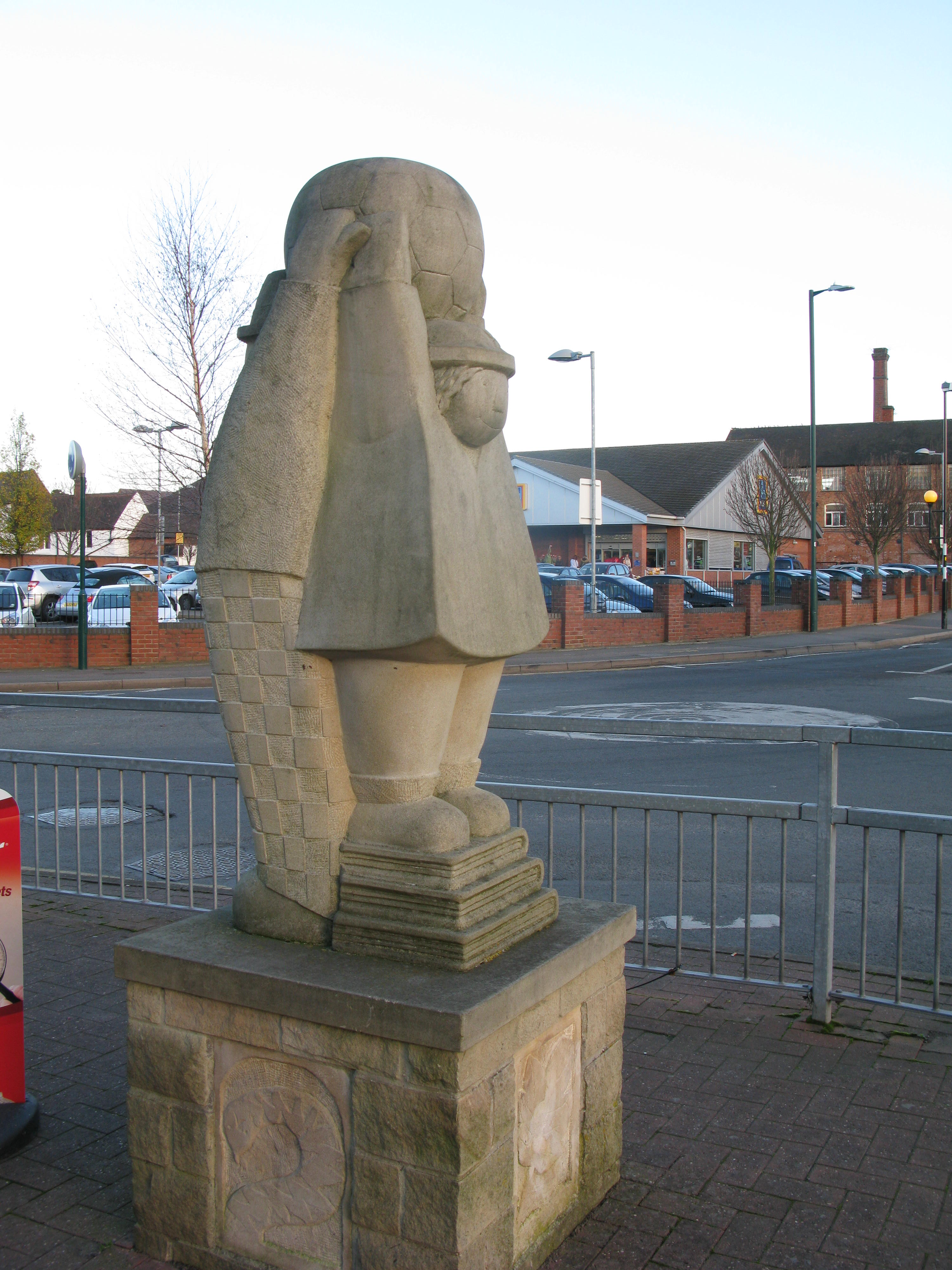
A sculpture of the Atherstone Ball Game created by Michael Disley, which stands outside the town's Tesco supermarket.

The original medieval football game honoured by the annual event was held in Atherstone in 1199, during which teams from Warwickshire and Leicestershire competed to win a bag of gold offered as a prize by King John. This original "Match of Gold", as it became known, was won by Warwickshire. The Ball Game was once one of many such games held in towns throughout England, but is presently one of three that continue to be held over Shrovetide, the other two being the Royal Shrovetide Football match in Ashbourne, Derbyshire, and Scoring the Hales in Alnwick, Northumberland.

Medieval football matches were more common before the 20th century, but their violent nature led the government of the time to pass the Highway Act 1835 to prevent it being played in the streets, although games continued to take place in Atherstone. In 1901, an attempt by police and local authorities to also have the Atherstone game banned was rejected by parish councillors. The game continued throughout World War I and World War II, even though shopkeepers had difficulty sourcing wood to board up their premises, and leather for the ball was difficult to obtain. The Cheshire family, who won the game during World War II, filled the ball with cigarettes and tobacco to send to British troops of the Eighth Army, who were stationed in the Sahara desert. Before the 1970s the game was played throughout the town, but was restricted to Long Street because the ball frequently ended up in the Coventry Canal. In 1986, a public meeting was held to determine the game's future after that year's event got out of hand. The outcome of this meeting was the formation of a Ball Game committee, which now has responsibility for organising the event. The 2001 foot-and-mouth outbreak almost led to that year's game being cancelled, but it was given the go-ahead at the last minute, becoming the only such game of its type to be held in 2001 as the Ashbourne game did not take place. The 2005 game marked the first occasion on which money was raised for charity, with funds donated to the Indian Ocean Tsunami Appeal.

In 2012, and following cuts to policing that would reduce the number of officers present at the game, a new company was formed to help the game comply with health and safety regulations. An 18-year-old competitor from the nearby town of Nuneaton was also treated in hospital after being knocked unconscious during the final minutes of the game. Violence broke out at the 2019 game and committee chairman Rob Bernard later suggested those responsible for the violence threatened the game's future, stating: "In the past, when things have got out of hand, we've put it out there that the future of the Ball Game is under threat and it calms down a bit the following year... But then it comes back again. It is the nature of it." Following the 2019 game, a clip of participants fighting received 3.4 million views on Facebook, and a report in the Daily Mirror newspaper claimed that a man's ear had been ripped off during the fracas. However, no such casualties were reported either by police or ambulance officials.

The 2020 game, held on 25 February of that year, was abandoned around halfway through the match when a steward was taken ill, having collapsed from a heart attack at the town's Conservative Club. He was treated at the scene by first responders – special constables and paramedics from West Midlands Ambulance Service – before being airlifted to hospital, where he underwent medical procedures. A JustGiving page was subsequently established to provide financial help for his family.

In 2021, the game was cancelled for the first time in its 821‑year history due to the ongoing COVID-19 pandemic. It returned in March the following year. The 2023 game was reported to have been the scene of a number of violent incidents, including a mass brawl where several kicks and punches were thrown, and during which damage was caused to a William Hill bookies. This prompted Warwickshire Police to issue a warning prior to the 2024 game that "Levels of violence witnessed last year will not be tolerated".

== Ball manufacturer ==
For several years the ball was made by the sportswear manufacturer Webb Ellis. Prior to this Alan Johnson the local saddler from Market Street was the maker from the 1950s. Following the 2017 game, Webb Ellis cancelled their contract to make the ball. As a consequence, Atherstone upholsterer, Pete Smith, was commissioned to produce the ball for the 2018 game. This marked the first occasion the ball had been made in the town since 1982. Smith based his design on an original cardboard template made by local craftsman Brian Brown.

== Media coverage ==
Coverage of the game was first heard on BBC radio in 1934, and footage of it was first shown on television in 1958. The game was featured on a 2018 edition of BBC One's The One Show, drawing criticism from both users of social media because of the game's rough nature, and from Atherstone residents because of the negative way the event had been portrayed by the programme.

== Legacy ==
In 2011, the Coventry Telegraph reported that a new housing development in Australia which shares its name with Atherstone was keen to host a version of the ball game, and forge links with its UK counterpart. The article quoted Bob Turner, a local councillor from the City of Melton, who said: "It would be great to import the game when we have a main street built. It could be a good way to launch the main street and the development. But we would probably have to find out the rules involved first!" Harold Taft, a long-term member of the Ball Game Committee who had recently stepped down from the role, said he would be willing to offer the new town some advice, but would not want them to create an exact replica of the game.
