= Mary Fox (artist) =

British artist

- Born: 1922; Atherstone, England
- Died: 2005 (aged 82–83)
- Education: Leicester School of Art; Central School of Arts and Crafts
- Known for: Painting, printmaking

Mary Fox (1922–2005) was a British artist, painter and printmaker.

== Biography ==
Fox was born at Atherstone in Warwickshire and studied at the Leicester School of Art in 1939 and then at the Central School of Arts and Crafts in London. Fox was greatly influenced by a number of the Polish and German emigree artists who arrived in Britain before World War II. She was a regular exhibitor in group shows at the Royal Academy in London and with both the New English Art Club and the Women's International Art Club. Throughout the 1960s, Fox had three solo exhibitions at the John Whibley Gallery in London. Further solo exhibitions followed at the Sue Rankin Gallery in 1986 and at the Stables in Birmingham beginning in 1993. Examples of her work are held by the Victoria and Albert Museum in London, by Portsmouth City Museum and in the Arts Council England collection.
