= HMS Atherstone (M38) =

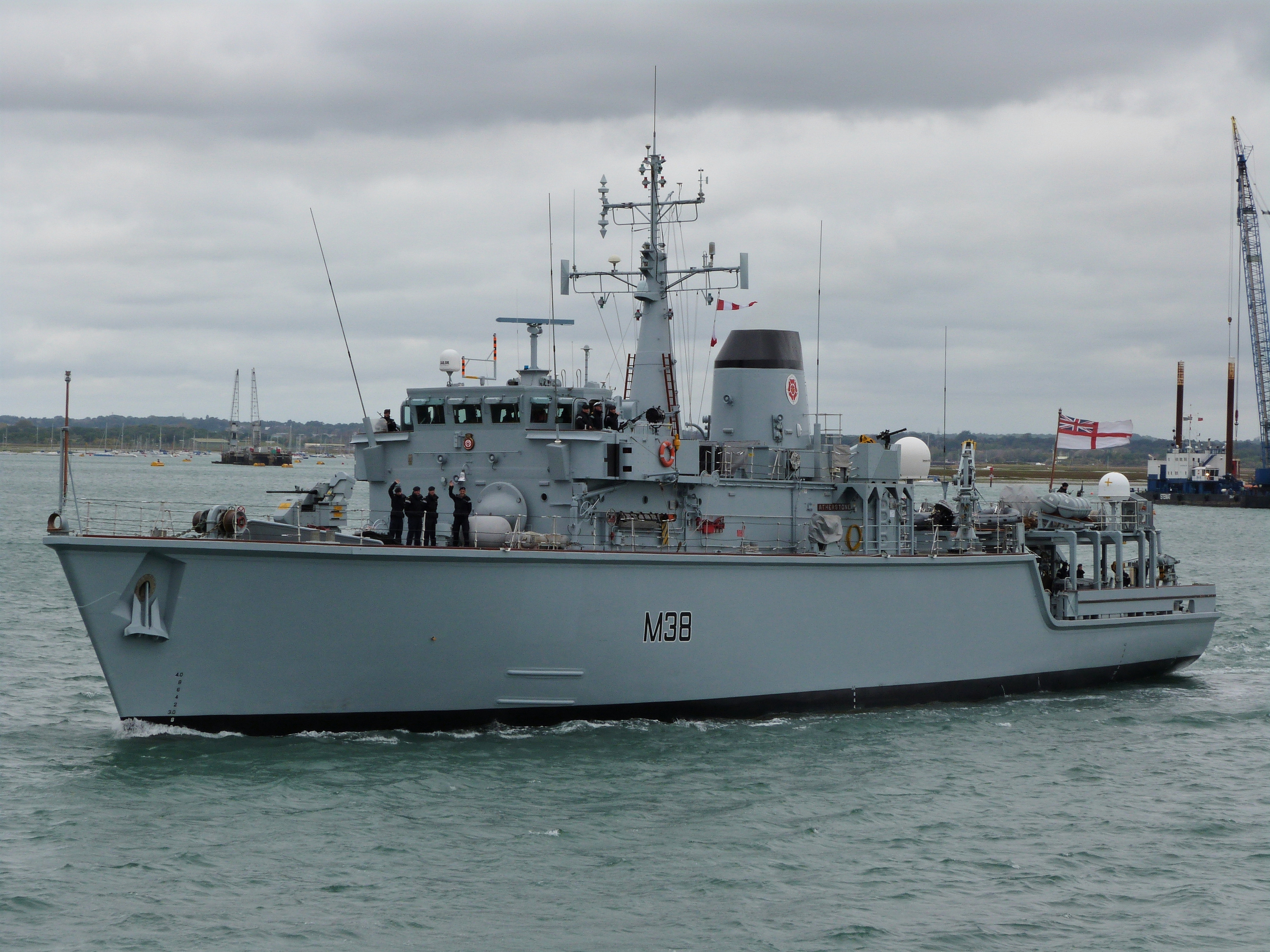
- HMS Atherstone

History

United Kingdom
- Name: HMS Atherstone
- Namesake: Atherstone
- Builder: Vosper Thornycroft, Woolston, Southampton
- Launched: 1 March 1986
- Sponsored by: Amy Jarvis, wife of the then Deputy Controller of the Royal Navy
- Commissioned: 17 January 1987
- Decommissioned: 14 December 2017
- Home port: HMNB Portsmouth
- Identification: IMO number: 4906666; MMSI number: 234566000; Callsign: GBPJ; Pennant number: M38
- Nickname(s): The Crazy A
- Fate: Sold
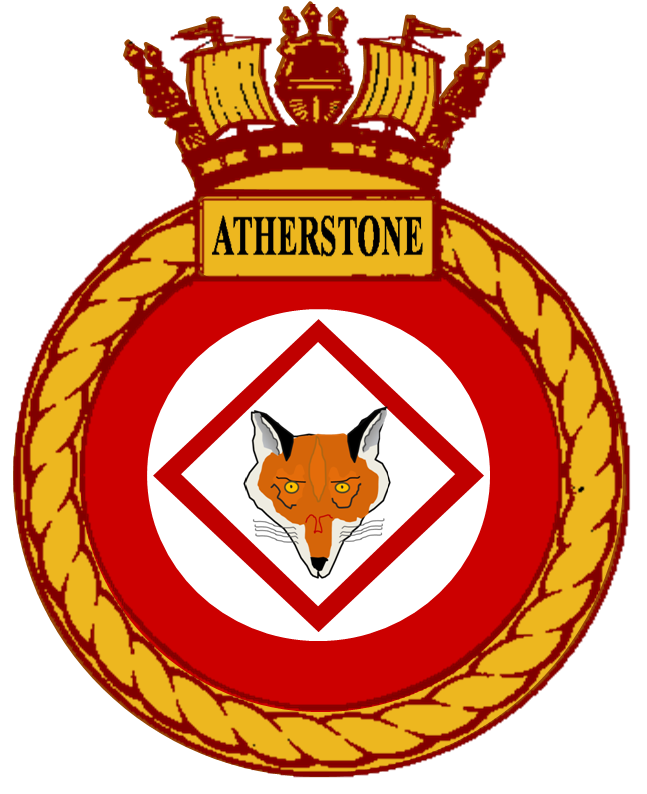
- Badge

General characteristics
- Class & type: Hunt-class mine countermeasures vessel
- Displacement: 750 t (740 long tons; 830 short tons)
- Length: 60 m (196 ft 10 in)
- Beam: 9.8 m (32 ft 2 in)
- Draught: 2.2 m (7 ft 3 in)
- Propulsion: 2 shaft Napier Deltic diesel, 3,540 shp (2,640 kW)
- Speed: 17 knots (31 km/h; 20 mph)
- Complement: 45 (6 officers & 39 ratings)
- Sensors & processing systems: Sonar Type 2193
- Electronic warfare & decoys: SeaFox mine disposal system; Diver-placed explosive charges
- Armament: 1 × 30mm DS30M Mk2 gun; 2 × Miniguns; 3 × General purpose machine guns

HMS Atherstone was a Hunt-class mine countermeasures vessel of the Royal Navy, the third ship to bear the name. Built by Vosper Thornycroft shipbuilders at Woolston, Southampton, it was launched on 1 March 1986 by Amy Jarvis, the wife of Pat Jarvis, CB, the Deputy Controller of the Navy at the Ministry of Defence, and commissioned on 17 January 1987. It was the tenth ship of its class.

== Operational history ==
HMS Atherstone was accepted into service on 28 November 1986 and commissioned at HMNB Portsmouth on 17 January 1987. The ship had a close association with the town of Atherstone, and was latterly part of the 2nd Mine Countermeasure (MCM) Squadron based at Portsmouth.

In December 2015, Atherstone returned from the Persian Gulf after a two-year deployment as part of Operation Telic in the Middle East, in support of coalition operations to promote and maintain peace in the Persian Gulf. It helped to provide assurance to merchant shipping, by conducting mine-countermeasure surveys in the main shipping routes throughout the region. It participated in 2014 IMCMEX.

After spending a period alongside in extended readiness, Atherstone was lifted out of the water into the "Minor War Vessels Centre of Specialisation"; the former shipbuilding hall at HMNB Portsmouth in December 2016 in readiness to enter refit However, in October 2017 it was revealed that the planned refit would not take place and Atherstone would be decommissioned on 14 December 2017. On 3 June 2020, the stripped down Atherstone was advertised for sale. It was sold in June 2022 to Harland & Wolff with the intention of utilising parts in the refurbishment of HMS Quorn for the Lithuanian Navy, and then rebuilding it for non-military use.
