= Atherstone railway station =

Railway station in Warwickshire, England

Atherstone
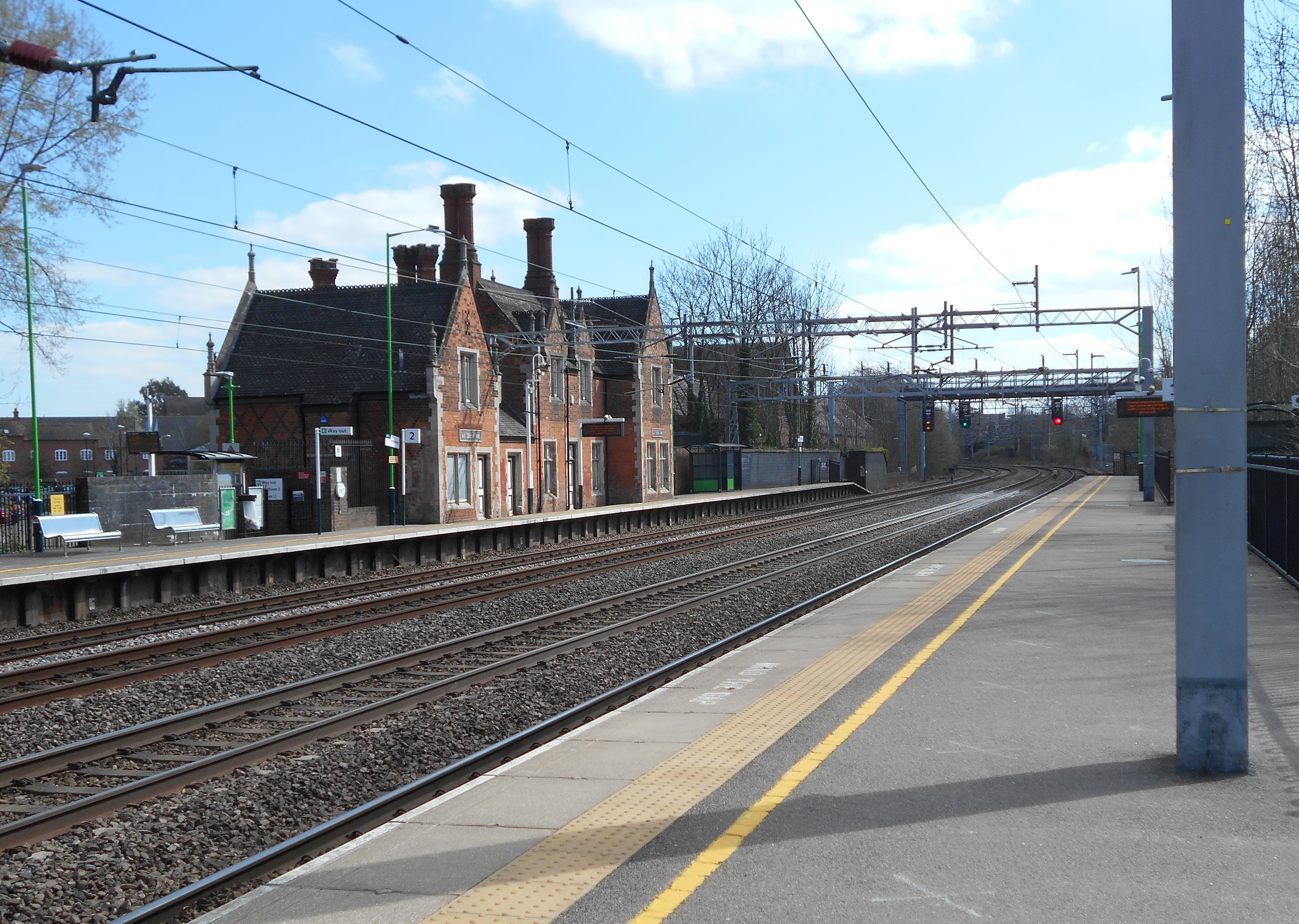
- Standing on the northbound platform looking south, towards London in 2023.

General information
- Location: Atherstone, Borough of North Warwickshire; England
- Coordinates: 52.579°N 1.553°W
- Grid reference: SP304979
- Manager: London Northwestern Railway
- Platforms: 2
- Tracks: 4

Other information
- Station code: ATH
- Classification: DfT category F2

Passengers
- 2021/22: ▲95,118
- 2022/23: ▲98,690
- 2023/24: ▲106,942
- 2024/25: ▲113,120
- 2025/26: ▲125,614
Location
Notes
- Passenger statistics from the Office of Rail and Road

Atherstone is a railway station serving the market town of Atherstone, in Warwickshire, England. It is on the Trent Valley section of the West Coast Main Line, exactly 102 miles (164 km) from London Euston.

== History ==
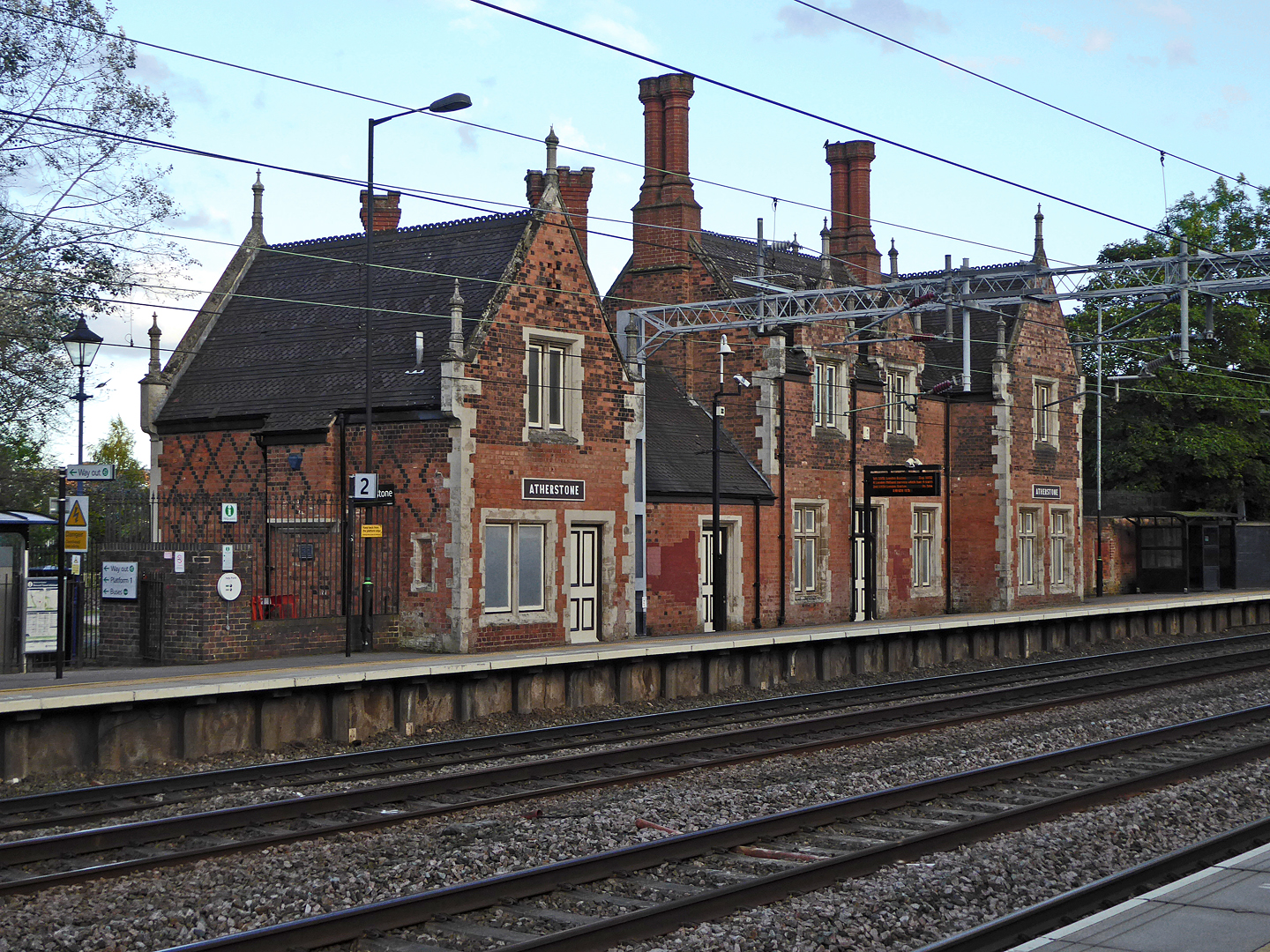
Preserved 1847 station building, no longer in railway use as it is now in private ownership

The station was designed by John William Livock and opened by the London and North Western Railway in 1847. The line through the station was originally double track, but was widened to quadruple track during 1901-1909. The original down (northbound) platform was demolished and replaced by the current one during this time to accommodate the extra tracks. It was absorbed by the London Midland and Scottish Railway in the Grouping of 1923. The station passed to the London Midland Region of British Railways on nationalisation in 1948. When British Rail introduced sectorisation in the 1980s, the station was served by the Regional Railways until the privatisation of British Rail.

The Tudor style station building has been grade II listed since 1980. All of the stations on the Trent Valley Line originally had similar station buildings in the same style, designed by John William Livock, however the one at Atherstone is the only remaining Livock designed building on a Trent Valley station which is still open; all the others having since been demolished and replaced. Other examples still exist at the closed Bulkington and Colwich stations. The station building was restored in 1985. It has not been used for railway purposes since 1972, when the station became unstaffed, and is now in private ownership. It is currently used by a veterinary practice.

=== Accidents ===
In 1860 there was a train crash at Atherstone that killed 10 people.

=== Historic services ===
The current hourly service was introduced by the previous operating company London Midland in December 2008. The current hourly service is the best service Atherstone has ever received; historically the station received only an infrequent local stopping service, few of which went further north than Stafford or further south than either Rugby or Coventry; for example the May 1974 timetable shows six daily trains between Stafford and Rugby in each direction, calling at Atherstone. When the Coventry to Nuneaton Line was reopened to passenger trains in 1987, the service was diverted to terminate at Coventry instead of Rugby. By the time of the May 2000 timetable, the service had been reduced to five daily trains between Stafford and Coventry. Passenger use at the station has grown rapidly since the introduction of the new service.

From May 2014, Atherstone was part of the previous operator London Midland's Project 110 scheme which saw the speed of the Class 350 trains on the Euston-Crewe service increase from 100 to 110 miles per hour (180 km/h), and take the express train route via Weedon rather than travel via the Northampton loop line. As a result, Atherstone lost its direct link with Northampton but the journey time to/from London was cut by 30 minutes, with most trains now timetabled to take 82 minutes to reach the capital. However, a few trains do go via Northampton Monday - Sunday.

== Services ==
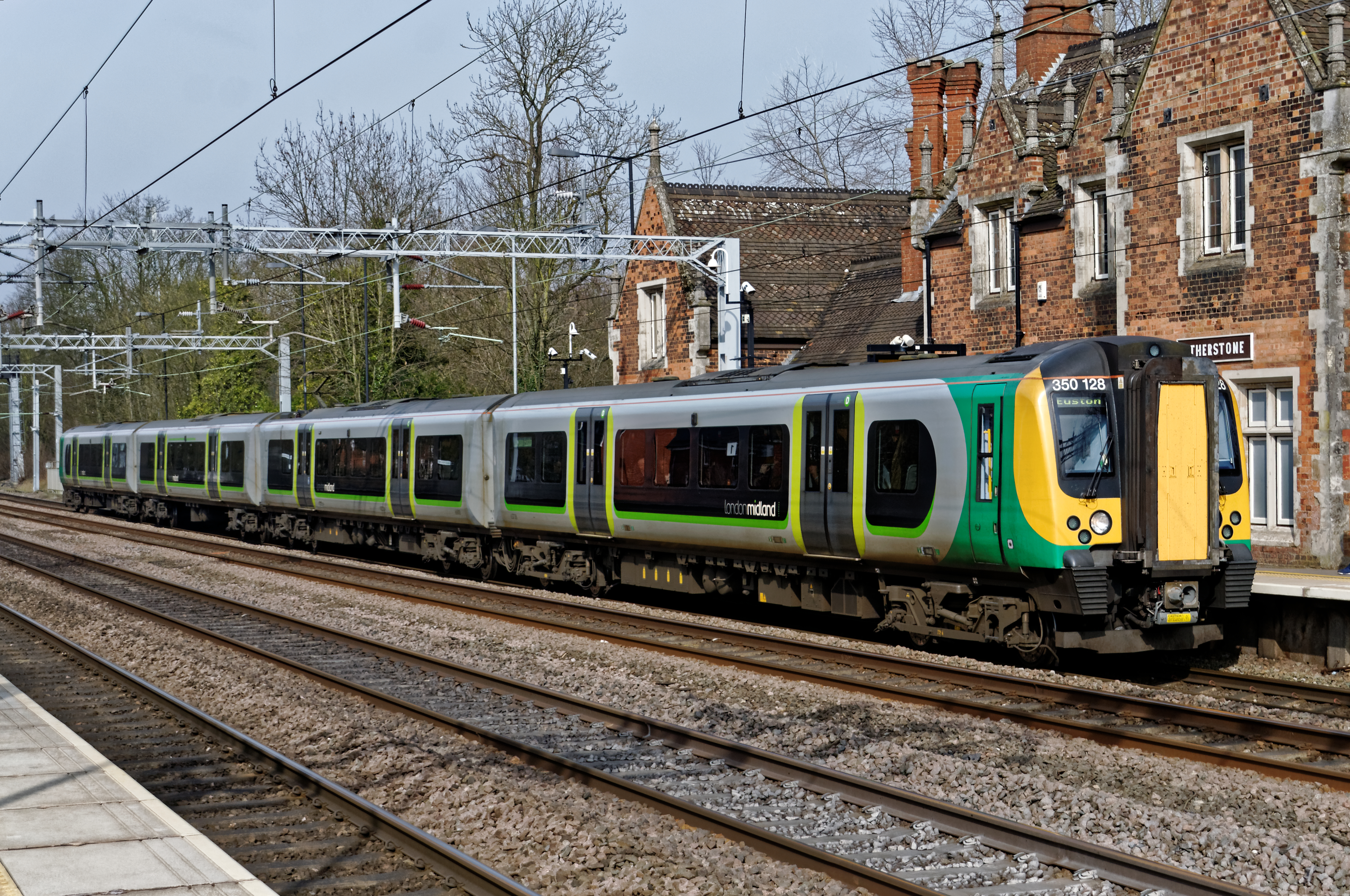
A London Midland Class 350 with a service to London Euston

West Midlands Trains, operating under the London Northwestern Railway branding, provides an hourly service in each direction; southbound to London Euston via Nuneaton, Rugby and Milton Keynes Central, and northbound to Crewe via Stafford. The two earliest northbound services originates from Northampton.

Preceding station	National Rail	Following station
Tamworth towards Crewe	London Northwestern Railway London–Crewe	Nuneaton towards London Euston
Polesworth Limited service towards Crewe	London Northwestern Railway London–Crewe	Nuneaton towards London Euston
