= Alscot Park =

Grade I listed building in Preston on Stour, United Kingdom

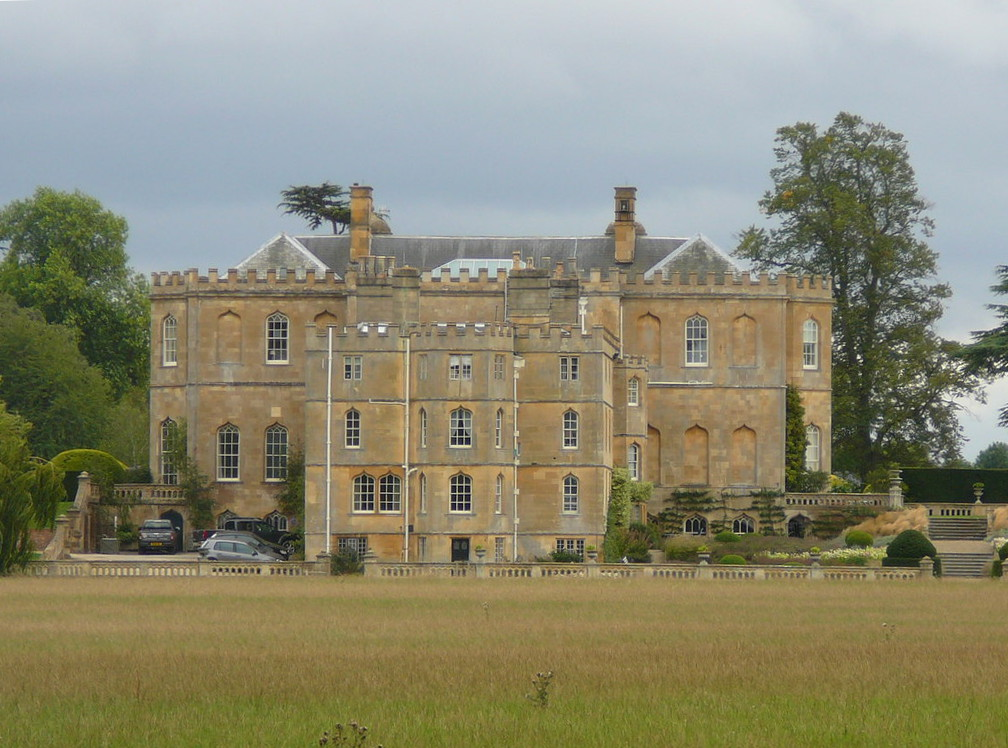
- Alscot Park in 2011
- Interactive map of Alscot Park
- Location: Preston on Stour, Warwickshire, England
- Coordinates: 52.152223°N 1.697293°W
- OS grid reference: SP 20805 50471

Listed Building – Grade I
- Official name: Alscot Park
- Designated: 6 February 1952
- Reference no.: 1382655

Listed Building – Grade II
- Official name: Stables approximately 150 metres south east of Alscot Park
- Designated: 5 April 1967
- Reference no.: 1382658

National Register of Historic Parks and Gardens
- Official name: Alscot Park
- Type: Grade II
- Designated: 1 February 1986
- Reference no.: 1001183

Alscot Park is a Georgian country house in Preston on Stour, some 3 miles (5 km) south of Stratford-upon-Avon in Warwickshire, England. It is Grade I listed and was built in a Rococo Gothic style for James West during the mid-18th century.

The house is built of limestone ashlar to a T-shaped plan with a hipped slate roof, and it has a two-storey frontage of 7 bays. It stands in 4,000 acres of park and farmland, which is Grade II listed and bisected by the River Stour. Several other associated buildings, such as stables and entrance lodges, are also listed. A number of former features of the estate – such as the pleasure grounds, an obelisk and a Chinese pavilion – have since been lost.

== History ==
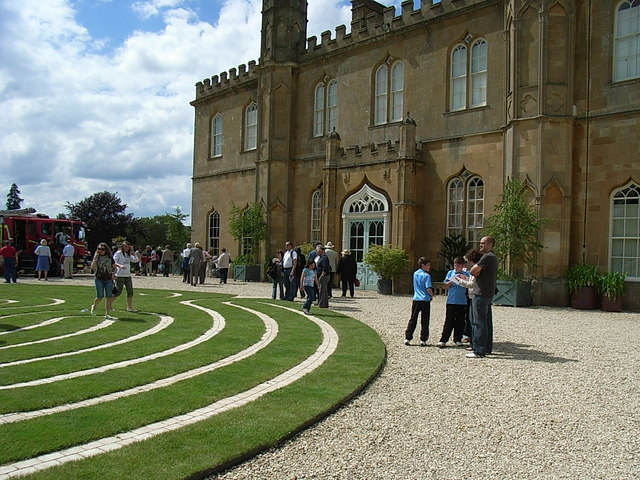
The front of the house in 2008

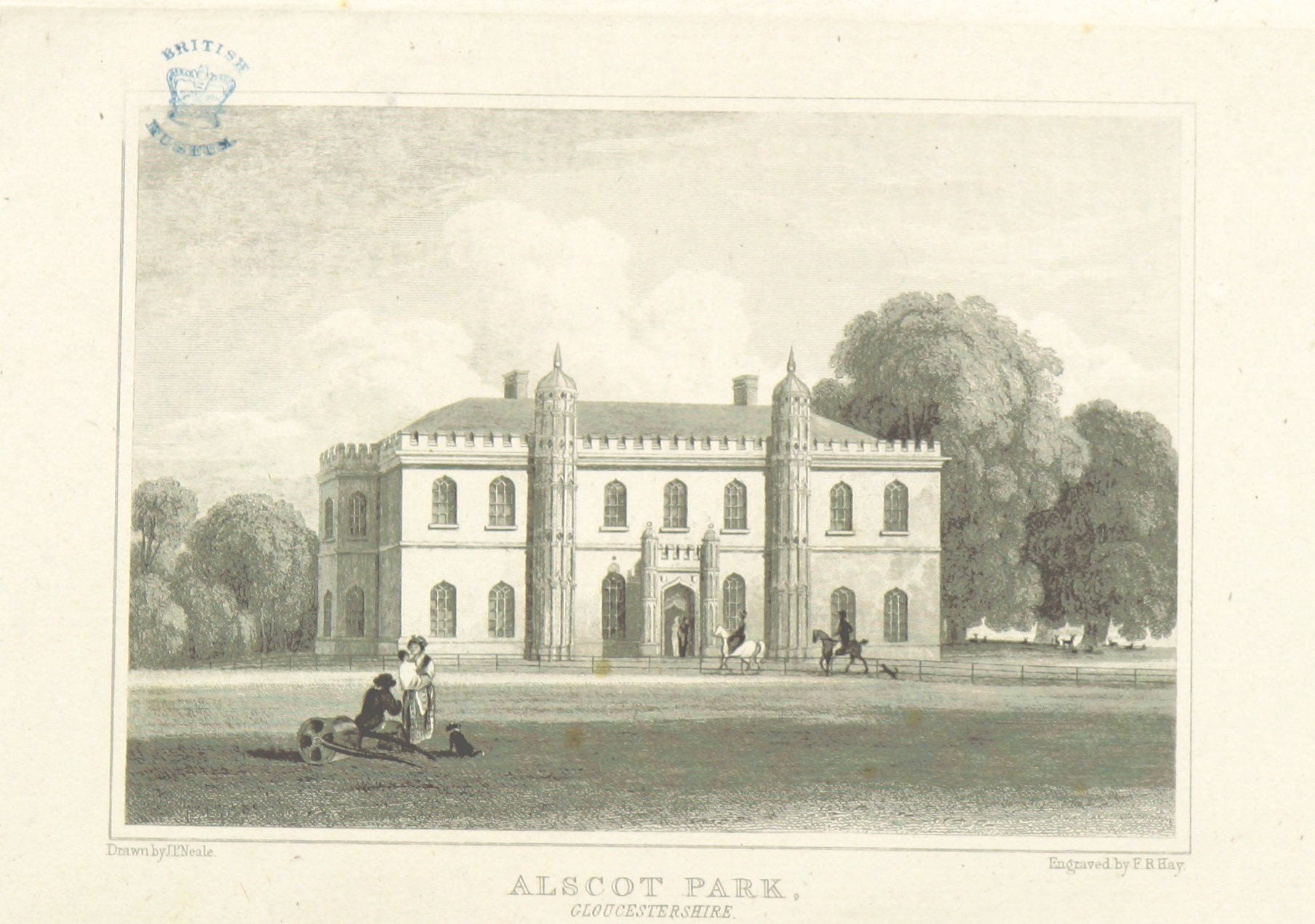
Alscot Park in 1818

In 1747, the manors were bought by James West, then-Secretary to the Chancellor of the Exchequer and the MP for St Albans. Pending his retirement from his final post as Secretary to the Treasury in 1762, he created the present house in two stages from an older house on the site. The north wing was remodelled in 1747 and the south wing added in 1762. Stables and a conservatory were added between 1762 and 1766.

A Gothic Revival entrance porch was designed later (1815 to 1820) and added to the south front. Gothic lodges at the Stratford Road entrance were built in 1838.

James West the younger, the only son of West and his wife Sarah Steavens, heiress of a wealthy timber merchant, died in 1795, predeceasing his mother. Alscot Park therefor passed to James West the younger's son, James Robert West, who died in 1838. The estate was passed down in the West family to the present day.

Currently occupied by Emma Holman-West and her family, the estate has been developed to house residential properties, offices, studios and industrial space, winning the Bledisloe Gold Medal in 2011 from the Royal Agricultural Society for estate management.
