= Atherstone Hunt =

Fox hunt based in Warwickshire, England

The Atherstone Hunt was a United Kingdom foxhound pack, with a hunting area of around 400 square miles (1,000 km^{2}) within Warwickshire, Leicestershire and Staffordshire.

== History ==
The Atherstone was established in 1815 in Witherley, and known as the Atherstone hounds. Between 1930 and 1950 the hunt was divided into North and South countries, but these were then reunited.

== Country ==
The hunt country lies within Warwickshire, Leicestershire and Staffordshire, with major centres including Atherstone, Nuneaton, Coventry and Rugby. It adjoins the country of the Quorn.

== Point-to-point ==
The hunt hosts its annual point-to-point event at Clifton-upon-Dunsmore, with proceeds going back to the hunt.

== See also ==
- List of fox hunts in the United Kingdom
