= Atherstone Priory =

Priory in Warwickshire, England

Coordinates: 52.5741°N 1.5364°W

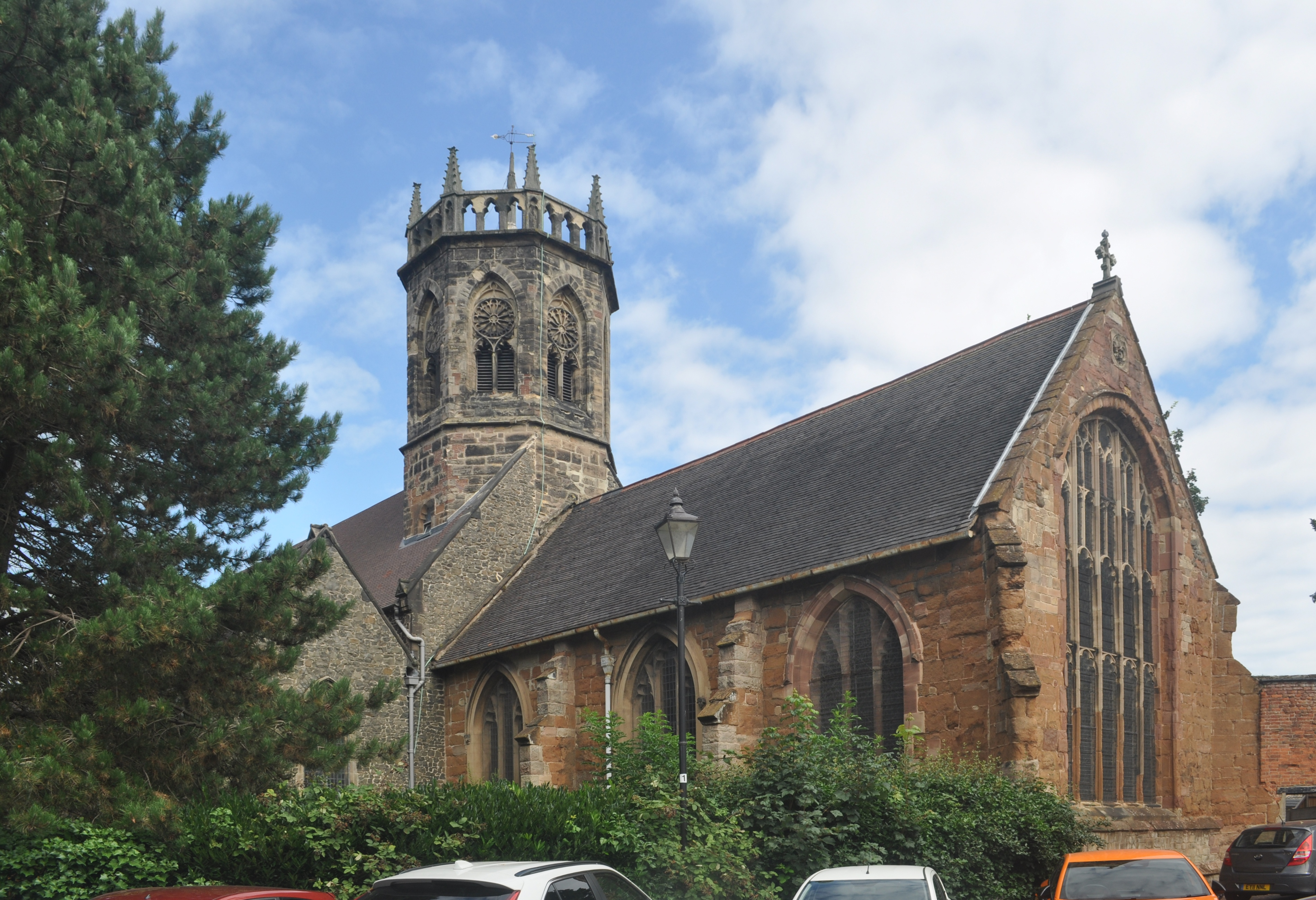
St Mary's Church chancel and tower remain from the medieval Atherstone Priory.

Atherstone Priory was a priory in Atherstone, Warwickshire, England.

The first monastic site in Atherstone was an Augustinian friary founded in the centre of the town in 1374 by Ralph, Lord Bassett of Drayton. Henry VII, as he was to become, took communion there before the Battle of Bosworth. At the dissolution of the monasteries in 1538 the nave became the town's parish church of St Mary, the chancel a grammar school and the remaining land leased to a Mr Cartwright.

In 1837–41 a new priory, known as the Convent of the Rosary, was built by Joseph Hansom in the east of the town for Dominican nuns. After several years of financial hardship they were obliged to sell it in 1857 to the Benedictine nuns of St Benedict's Priory, Colwich as a daughter house. The new priory convent, dedicated to St Scholastica, was founded in 1859 when a group of 19 nuns moved to Atherstone from Colwich. The priory was enlarged in 1873, again by Hansom.

Faced by falling numbers and encouraged by the Vatican Council, St Scholastica's voted in 1966 to rejoin Colwich. On 31 July 1967 the eighteen members of the Atherstone community transferred to Colwich and the Atherstone property was sold. The graves of the nuns were moved to St Mary's churchyard and the building demolished. The site is now a housing estate.
