= Atherstone on Stour =

Village in Warwickshire, England

Coordinates: 52.157°N 1.702°W

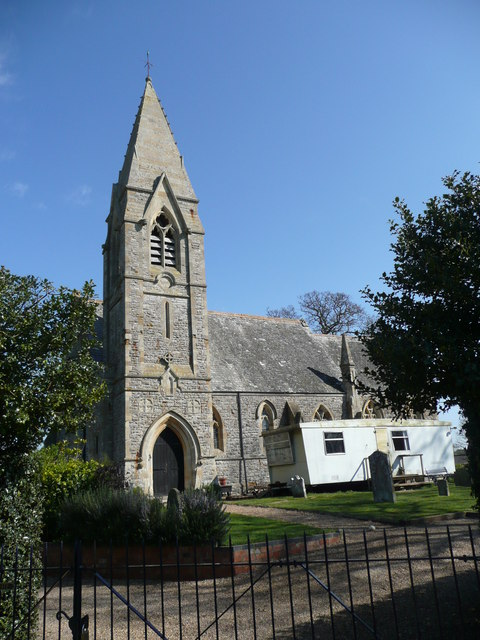
- St Mary's former parish church, now a private house

- Location within Warwickshire
- Population: 59 (2001 Census)
- OS grid reference: SP204510
- Civil parish: Atherstone on Stour
- District: Stratford-on-Avon
- Shire county: Warwickshire
- Region: West Midlands
- Country: England
- Sovereign state: United Kingdom
- Post town: Stratford-upon-Avon
- Postcode district: CV37
- Police: Warwickshire
- Fire: Warwickshire
- Ambulance: West Midlands
- UK Parliament: Stratford-on-Avon

Atherstone on Stour is a small village and civil parish about 3 miles (5 km) south of Stratford-upon-Avon in Warwickshire, England. The 2011 Census recorded the parish's population as 59.

== Parish church ==
Atherstone on Stour's medieval parish church was demolished in the 1870s and replaced with the present parish church of St Mary, which was completed in 1876. It incorporates masonry from the previous church, including the heads of two 14th-century windows and a wall-mounted marble monument to William Thomas, who died in 1710. St Mary's is now redundant and in 2008 was converted into a private house. Atherstone on Stour is now part of the Church of England parish of St Mary, Preston-on-Stour, which is the next village to the south.

== Houses ==
Alscot Park is a country house about 1/2 mile (800 m) south of the village. It has a 17th-century or earlier core but was remodelled in Rococo style in 1750–52. At the same time the grounds were landscaped, probably with advice from Sanderson Miller. A new wing was added to the house in 1764. Cutlin Mill Cottage was a 17th-century timber-framed cottage with brick nogging and a thatched roof. It was by the bridge over the River Stour southeast of the village, on the road to Ailstone. It was associated with a corn mill that was later converted into an oil mill. The cottage was Grade II listed but was abandoned because it suffered from flooding. The Alscot Estate let it fall into disrepair and in 2004 applied for listed building consent to demolish it. The Ancient Monuments Society opposed the application. On 28 May 2010 the cottage was destroyed by fire. The estate demolished the ruins and then applied retrospectively for the cottage to be de-listed.

== RAF Atherstone ==
RAF Atherstone was a Second World War air station east of the village that trained aircrew for RAF Bomber Command. It opened in 1941, was renamed RAF Stratford in 1942 and closed in 1945. The site is now used mainly for warehouses.

== Warehouse fire ==
On 2 November 2007 a large fire at a vegetable warehouse on the former airfield operated by Wealmoor Ltd made the national news and resulted in the deaths of four Warwickshire Fire and Rescue Service firefighters: John Averis, Ian Reid (who died in hospital), Ashley Stephens and Darren Yates-Badley. In February 2011 three senior officers of the Warwickshire Fire and Rescue Service were charged with manslaughter by gross negligence over the deaths. In May 2012 all three officers were acquitted of all charges.

== Gallery ==
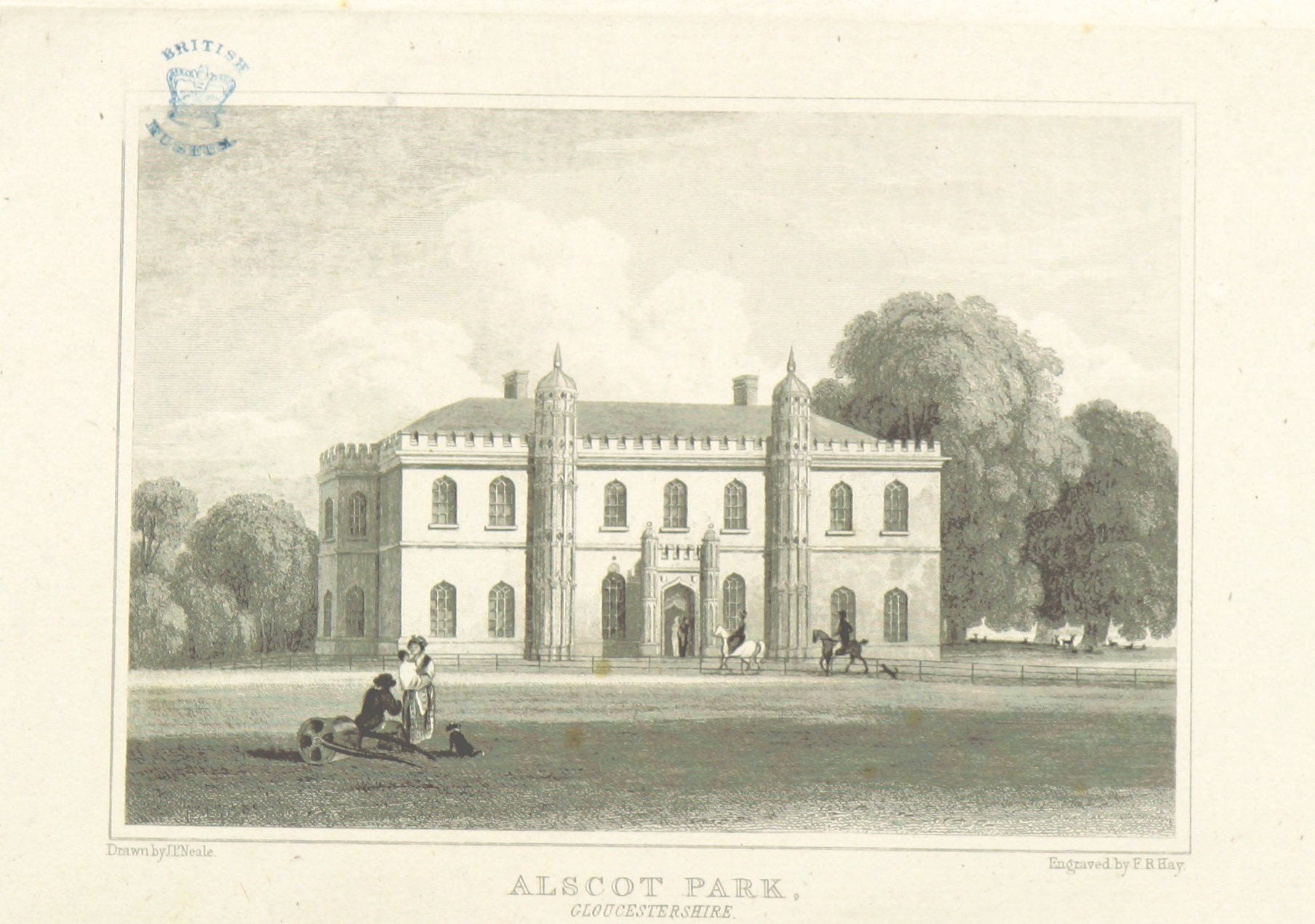
Alscot Park in 1818.

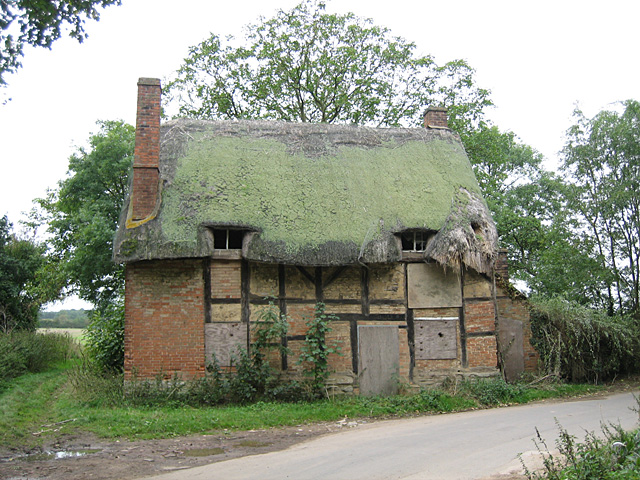
17th-century Cutlin Mill Cottage derelict in 2005. It burnt down in 2010.

== Sources ==
- Pevsner, Nikolaus; Wedgwood, Alexandra (1966). Warwickshire. The Buildings of England. Harmondsworth: Penguin Books. p. 78.
- Salzman, L.F, ed. (1949). A History of the County of Warwick. Victoria County History. Vol. 5: Kington Hundred. London: Oxford University Press for the Institute of Historical Research. pp. 3–5.
