= Warwickshire Fire and Rescue Service =

England fire and rescue service

Operational area
- Country: England
- County: Warwickshire

Agency overview
- Annual calls: 11341 (2018)
- Employees: 550
- Chief Fire Officer: Ben Brook

Facilities and equipment
- Stations: 17
- Engines: 30
- Platforms: 1
- Rescue boats: 1

Website
- www.warwickshire.gov.uk/fireandrescue

Warwickshire Fire and Rescue Service is the statutory fire and rescue service serving the county of Warwickshire in the West Midlands region of England.

The service covers an area of 1,975 km^{2} (763 square miles) and a population of around 546,600 people. It employs 550 staff and has 17 fire stations with 30 fire engines.

The service is administered by Warwickshire County Council. Its headquarters are in Leamington Spa.

In July 2021, Ben Brook was appointed Chief Fire Officer following the retirement of Kieran Amos (who had served in the role since April 2019). Brook was formerly the Assistant Chief Fire Officer for WFRS, having served in West Midlands Fire Service before that.

== History ==
The service was created in 1948 by the Fire Services Act 1947 and was originally called Warwick County Fire Brigade.

It did not cover the cities of Coventry or Birmingham, which had their own fire brigades. In 1974 the service lost area to the newly created West Midlands Fire Service.

=== 2007 warehouse fire ===
On 2 November 2007, crews were mobilised to a major fire at a vegetable packing plant operated by Wealmoor on an industrial estate in the village of Atherstone on Stour. Up to 100 firefighters and five ambulance crews were called to the scene and 16 fire engines were used to tackle the blaze. Part of the structure collapsed under the intensity of the fire.

Four firefighters of the Warwickshire Fire and Rescue Service were killed: Ian Reid, who died in hospital, and Ashley Stephens, Darren Yates-Badley, and John Averis whose bodies were recovered from the debris.

In February 2011, it was announced that two watch managers and one station manager, who were all at one time in command of the incident, were to face charges of manslaughter by gross negligence over the deaths of the men. They were acquitted in May 2012. Warwickshire County Council was charged with failing to ensure safety at work and pleaded guilty at a hearing in Wolverhampton in January 2012. It was fined £30,000 in December 2012.

== Performance ==
Every fire and rescue service in England and Wales is periodically subjected to a statutory inspection by His Majesty's Inspectorate of Constabulary and Fire & Rescue Services (HMICFRS). The inspections investigate how well the service performs in each of three areas. On a scale of outstanding, good, requires improvement and inadequate, Warwickshire Fire and Rescue Service was rated as follows:

HMICFRS Inspection Warwickshire
Area	Rating 2018/19	Rating 2021/22	Description
Effectiveness	Good	Requires improvement	How effective is the fire and rescue service at keeping people safe and secure from fire and other risks?
Efficiency	Good	Requires improvement	How efficient is the fire and rescue service at keeping people safe and secure from fire and other risks?
People	Requires Improvement	Requires improvement	How well does the fire and rescue service look after its people?

== Fire stations and appliances ==
WFRS operate a total of 17 fire stations. These are displayed on a map, and listed as follows:

WFRS Stations
Station	Crewing Type
20 - Nuneaton	224
21 - Bedworth	224
22 - Coleshill	224
23 - Polesworth	On-call (nights only)
24 - Atherstone	Day Crewed & Resilience pump (not crewed)
26 - Rugby	224
27 - Kenilworth	Day Crewed
29 - Leamington Spa (HQ)	224
30 - Southam	Day Crewed & On-call (nights only)
31 - Fenny Compton	Resilience pump (not crewed)
34 - Shipston-on-Stour	Resilience pump (not crewed)
35 - Stratford-upon-Avon	224
36 - Bidford-on-Avon	On-Call (nights only)
37 - Alcester	Day Crewed
39 - Henley-in-Arden	Day Crewed & On-call (nights only)
40 - Wellesbourne	Day Crewed & On-call (nights only)
41 - Gaydon	Resilience Pump (Not crewed)

The Headquarters of the service is at Leamington Spa Fire Station. This is where the Fire Control Room is also located.

WFRS's stations run on four types of shift

- 224 stations – have one or two appliances crewed 24 hours a day by four watches of Red Blue Green & White. They work two 12-hour day shifts and two 12-hour night shifts followed by four days off
- On-call stations – are crewed by on-call paid retained firefighters who live or work within five minutes of the station. They are alerted to an incident via pager.In Warwickshire On-call Firefighters are only able to be available for fire calls at night.
- Day Crewed stations – have an appliance crewed 12 hours a day by 11 personnel which are split into two watches, Alpha & Bravo. The two watches work a 7-day-fortnight shift pattern. The appliance isn't available during the night.
- Resilience stations – are not crewed, there are no firefighters who work from this location permanently. It is understood that there will be a bank of firefighters who will provide Resilience cover on their days off. They will be given notice as when to attend a particular station should they be required.

== See also ==
- List of British firefighters killed in the line of duty
- Warwickshire Police
- West Midlands Ambulance Service
- West Midlands Fire Service
