= Ball =

Round object

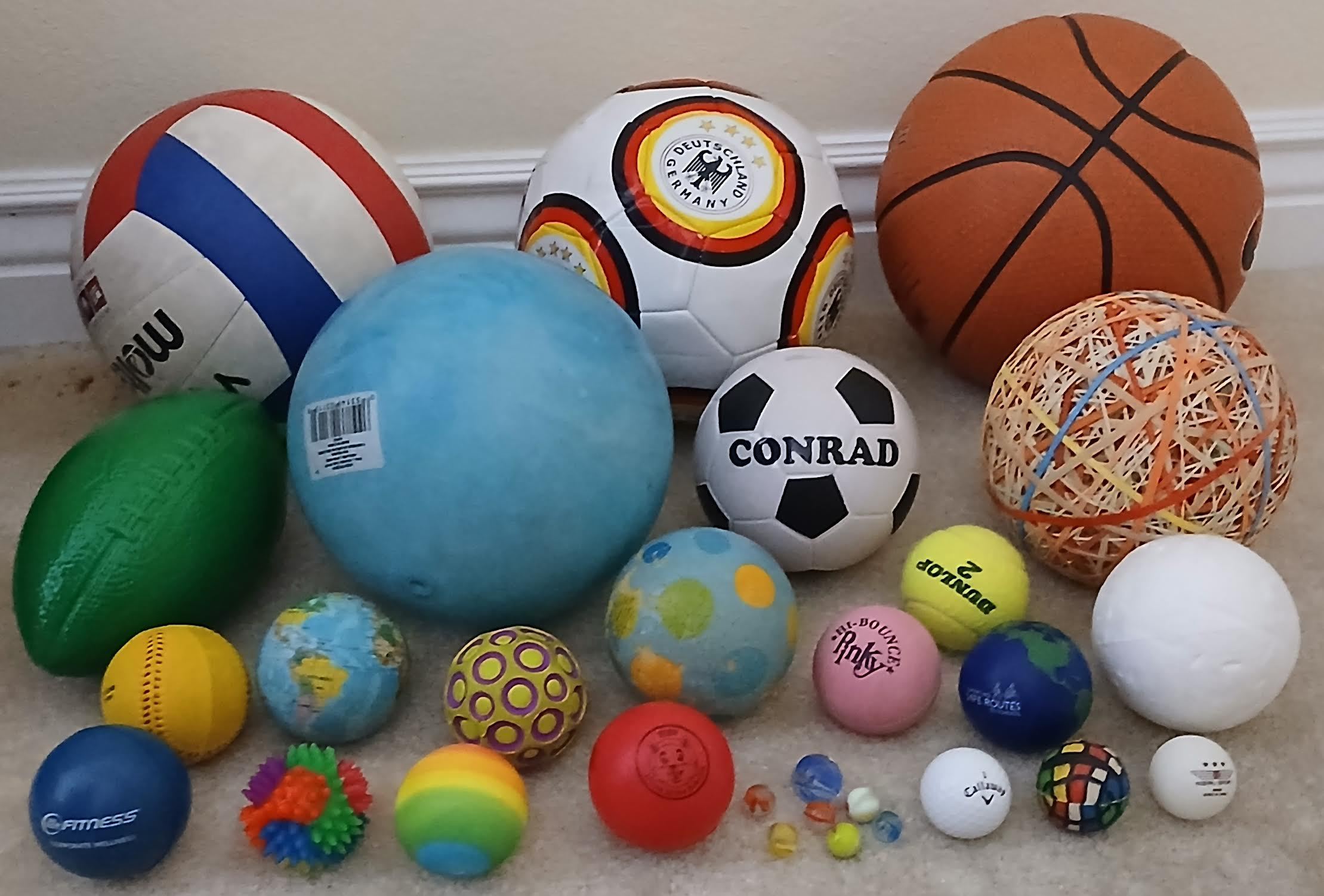
Group of balls

A ball is a round object (usually spherical, but sometimes ovoid). Balls can have several uses. For example they are used in ball games, where the play of the game follows the state of the ball as it is hit, kicked or thrown by players. Balls can also be used for simpler activities, such as catch or juggling. Balls made from hard-wearing materials are used in engineering applications to provide very low friction bearings, known as ball bearings. Black-powder weapons use stone and metal balls as projectiles.

Although many types of balls are today made from rubber, this form was unknown outside the Americas until after the voyages of Columbus. The Spanish were the first Europeans to see the bouncing rubber balls (although solid and not inflated) which were employed most notably in the Mesoamerican ballgame. Balls used in various sports in other parts of the world prior to Columbus were made from other materials such as animal bladders or skins, stuffed with various materials.

As balls are one of the most familiar spherical objects to humans, the word "ball" may refer to or describe spherical or near-spherical objects. "Ball" is used metaphorically sometimes to denote something spherical or spheroid, e.g., armadillos and human beings curl up into a ball, or making a fist into a ball.

== Etymology ==
The first known use of the word ball in English in the sense of a globular body that is played with was in 1205 in Layamon's Brut, or Chronicle of Britain in the phrase, "Summe heo driuen balles wide ȝeond Þa feldes." ("Some of them drove balls far across the fields.") The word came from the Middle English bal (inflected as ball-e, -es), in turn from Old Norse böllr (pronounced [bɔlːr]; compare Old Swedish baller, and Swedish boll) from Proto-Germanic ballu-z (whence probably Middle High German bal, ball-es, Middle Dutch bal), a cognate with Old High German ballo, pallo, Middle High German balle from Proto-Germanic *ballon (weak masculine), and Old High German ballâ, pallâ, Middle High German balle, Proto-Germanic *ballôn (weak feminine). No Old English cognate of any of these is known. (The hypothetical corresponding forms in Old English would have been beallu, -a, -e—compare bealluc, ballock.) If ball- was native in Germanic, it may have been a cognate with the Latin foll-is in sense of a "thing blown up or inflated." In the later Middle English spelling balle the word coincided graphically with the French balle "ball" and "bale" which has hence been erroneously assumed to be its source. French balle (but not boule) is assumed to be of Germanic origin, itself, however. In Ancient Greek the word πάλλα (palla) for "ball" is attested besides the word σφαίρα (sfaíra), sphere.

== History ==
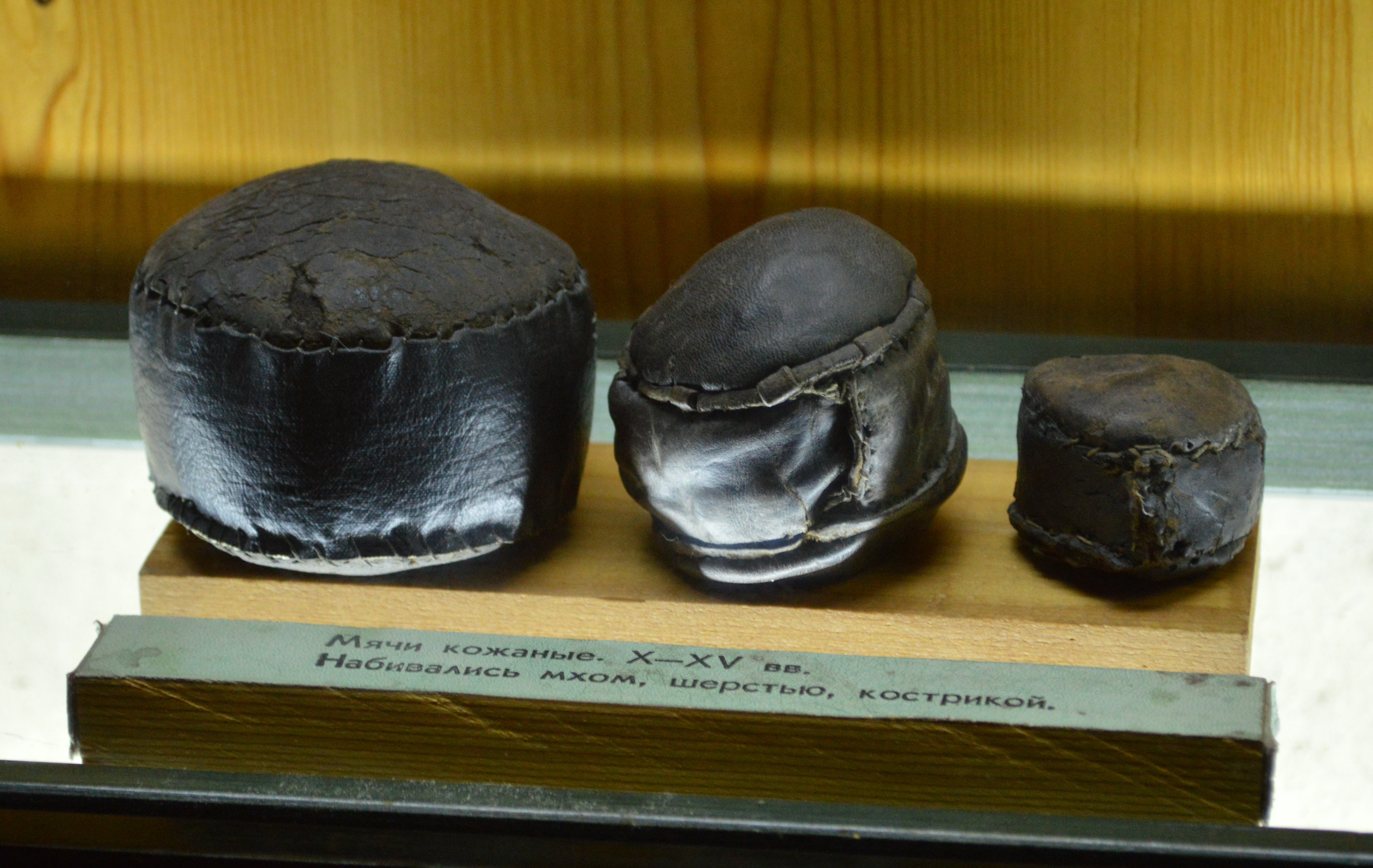
10th-15th century

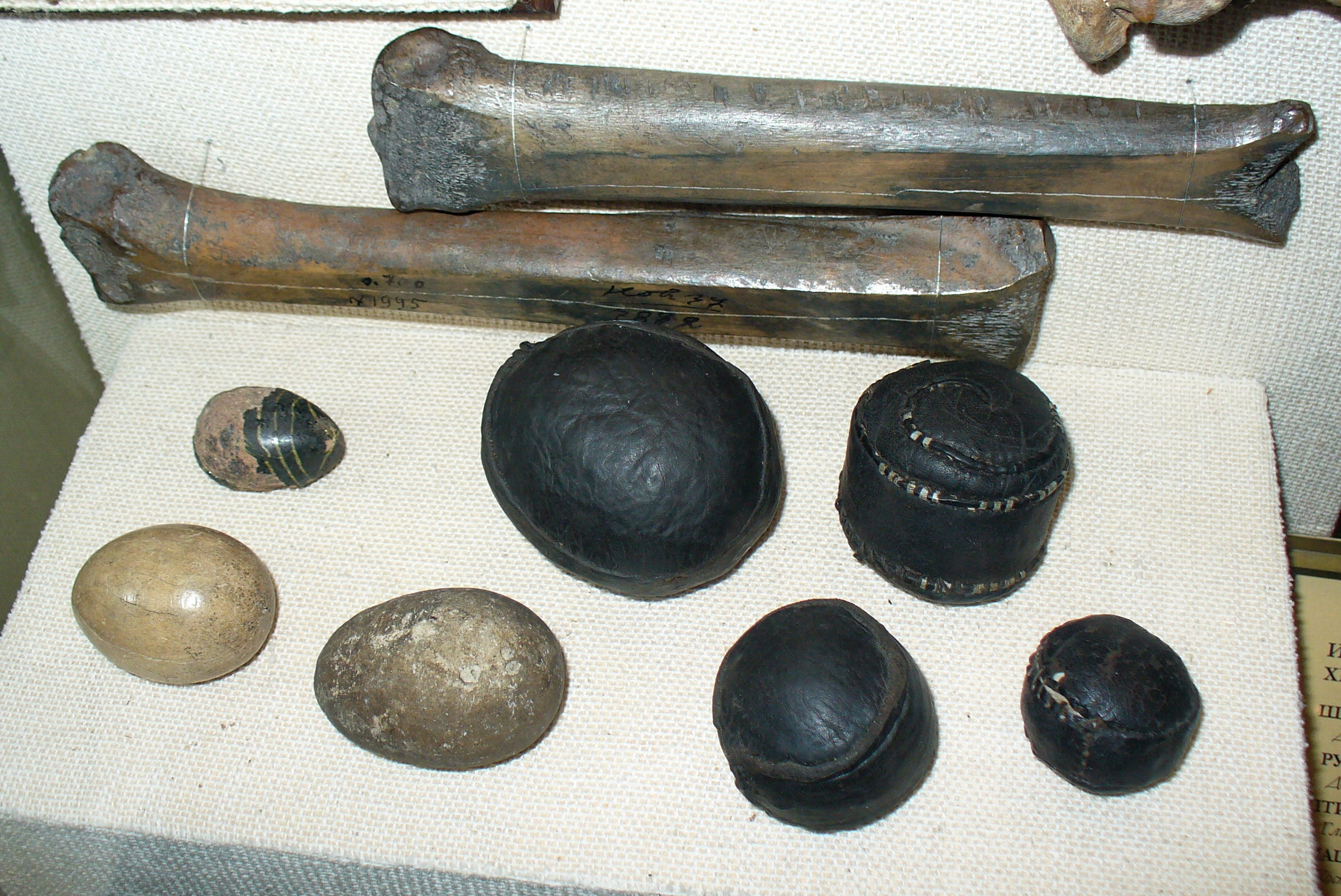
12th-13th century

Russian leather balls (Russian: мячи)

Some form of game with a ball is found portrayed on Egyptian monuments. In Homer, Nausicaa was playing at ball with her maidens when Odysseus first saw her in the land of the Phaeacians (Od. vi. 100). And Halios and Laodamas performed before Alcinous and Odysseus with ball play, accompanied with dancing (Od. viii. 370). The most ancient balls in Eurasia have been discovered in Karasahr, China and are 3000 years old. They were made of hair-filled leather.

=== Ancient Greeks ===
Among the ancient Greeks, games with balls (σφαῖραι) were regarded as a useful subsidiary to the more violent athletic exercises, as a means of keeping the body supple, and rendering it graceful, but were generally left to boys and girls. Of regular rules for the playing of ball games, little trace remains, if there were any such. The names in Greek for various forms, which have come down to us in such works as the Ὀνομαστικόν of Julius Pollux, imply little or nothing of such; thus, ἀπόρραξις (aporraxis) only means the putting of the ball on the ground with the open hand, οὐρανία (ourania), the flinging of the ball in the air to be caught by two or more players; φαινίνδα (phaininda) would seem to be a game of catch played by two or more, where feinting is used as a test of quickness and skill. Pollux (i. x. 104) mentions a game called episkyros (ἐπίσκυρος), which has often been looked on as the origin of football. It seems to have been played by two sides, arranged in lines; how far there was any form of "goal" seems uncertain. It was impossible to produce a ball that was perfectly spherical; children usually made their own balls by inflating pig's bladders and heating them in the ashes of a fire to make them rounder, although Plato (fl. 420s BC – 340s BC) described "balls which have leather coverings in twelve pieces".

=== Ancient Romans ===
Among the Romans, ball games were looked upon as an adjunct to the bath, and were graduated to the age and health of the bathers, and usually a place (sphaeristerium) was set apart for them in the baths (thermae). There appear to have been three types or sizes of ball, the pila, or small ball, used in catching games, the paganica, a heavy ball stuffed with feathers, and the follis, a leather ball filled with air, the largest of the three. This was struck from player to player, who wore a kind of gauntlet on the arm. There was a game known as trigon, played by three players standing in the form of a triangle, and played with the follis, and also one known as harpastum, which seems to imply a "scrimmage" among several players for the ball. These games are known to us through the Romans, though the names are Greek.

=== Modern ball games ===
The various modern games played with a ball or balls and subject to rules are treated under their various names, such as polo, cricket, football, etc.

Historic sport balls

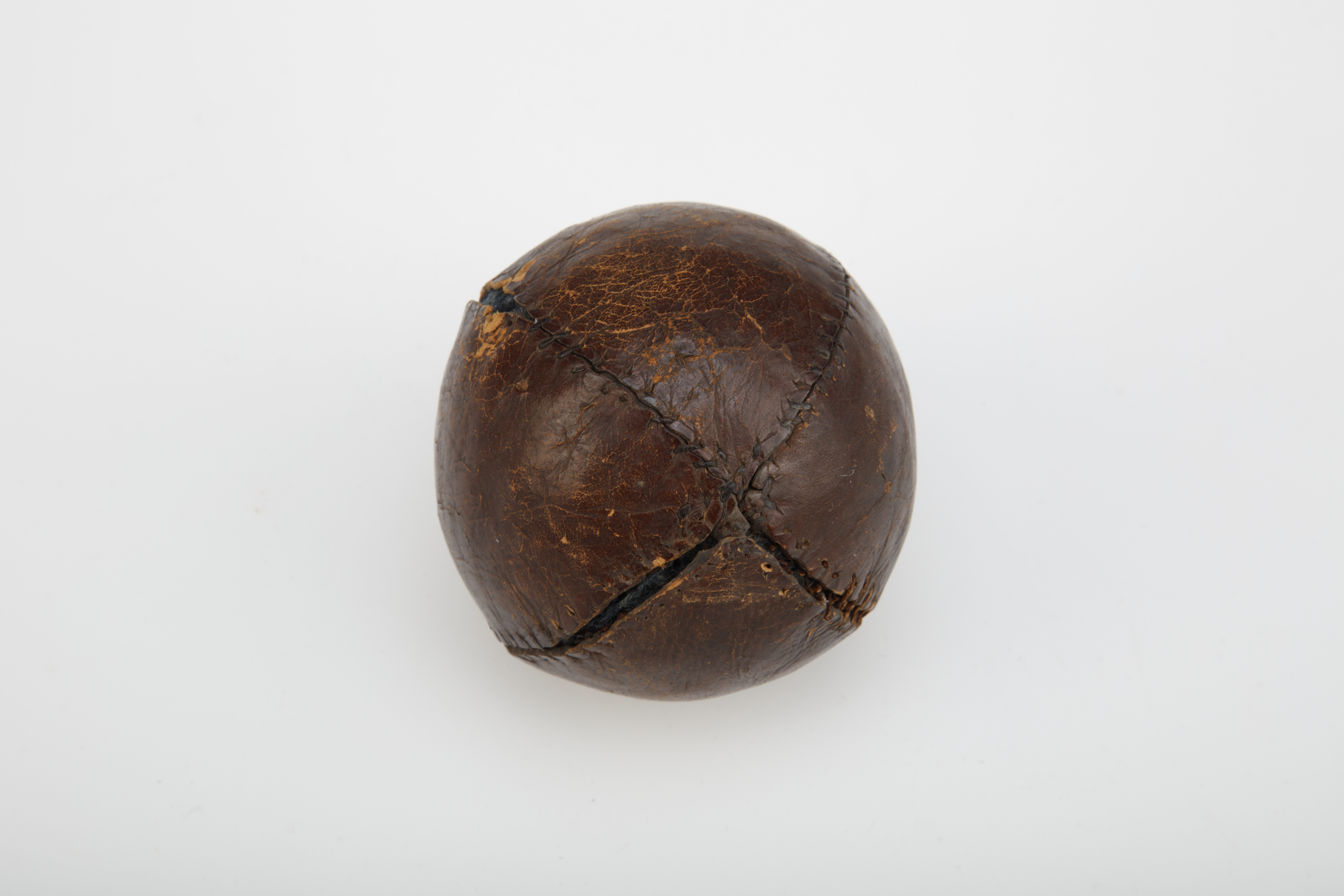
Baseball

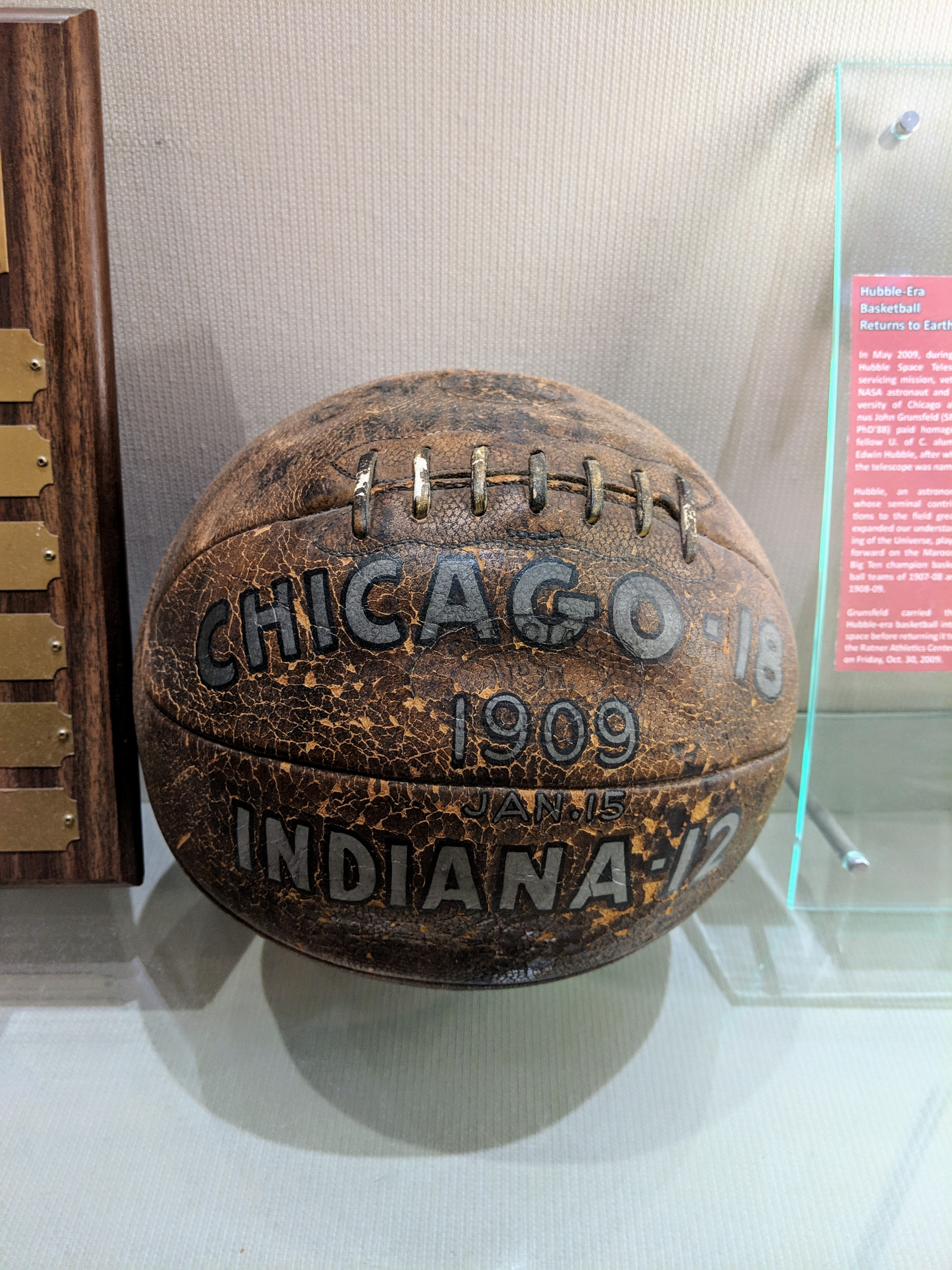
Basketball

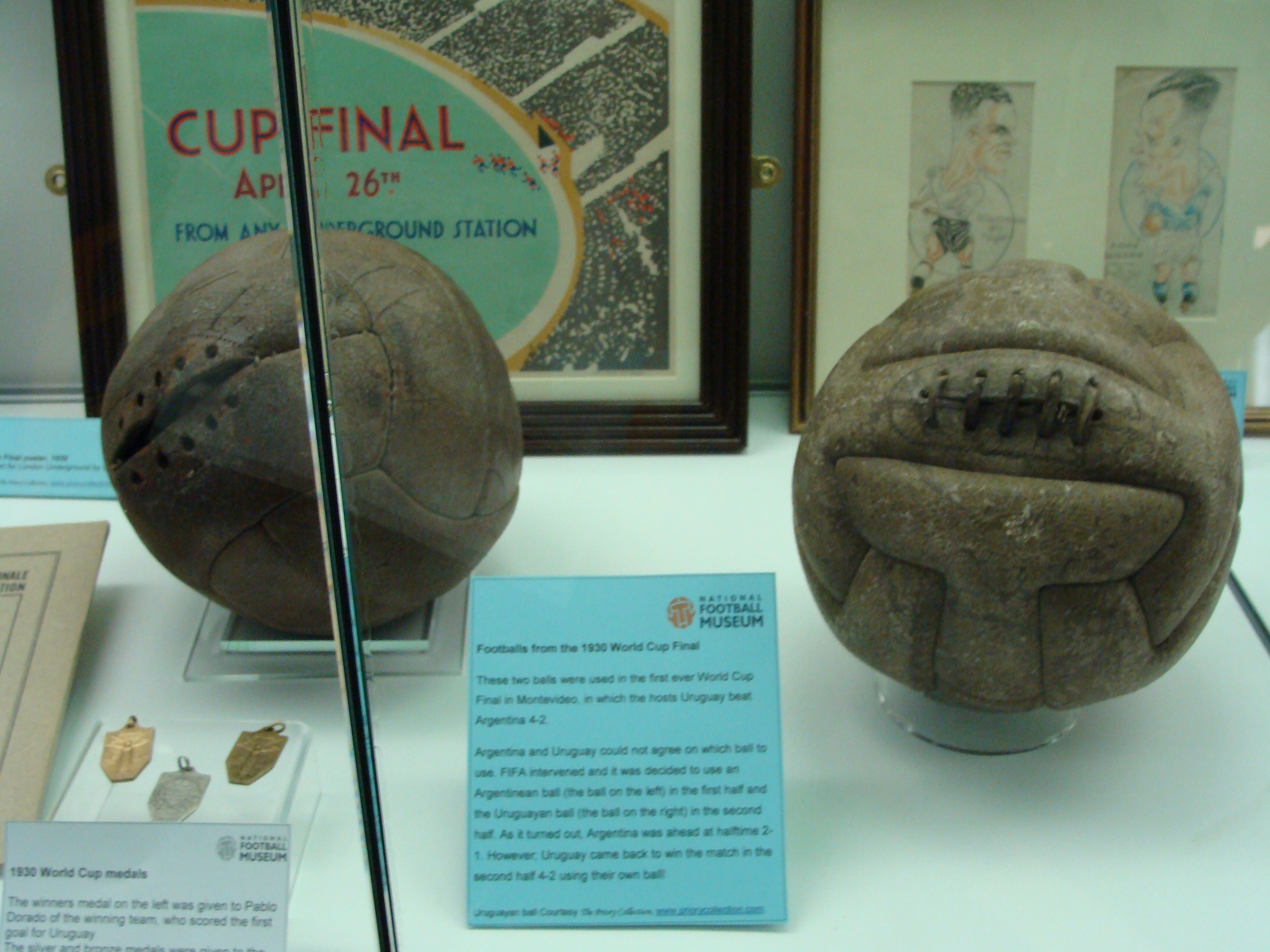
Soccer

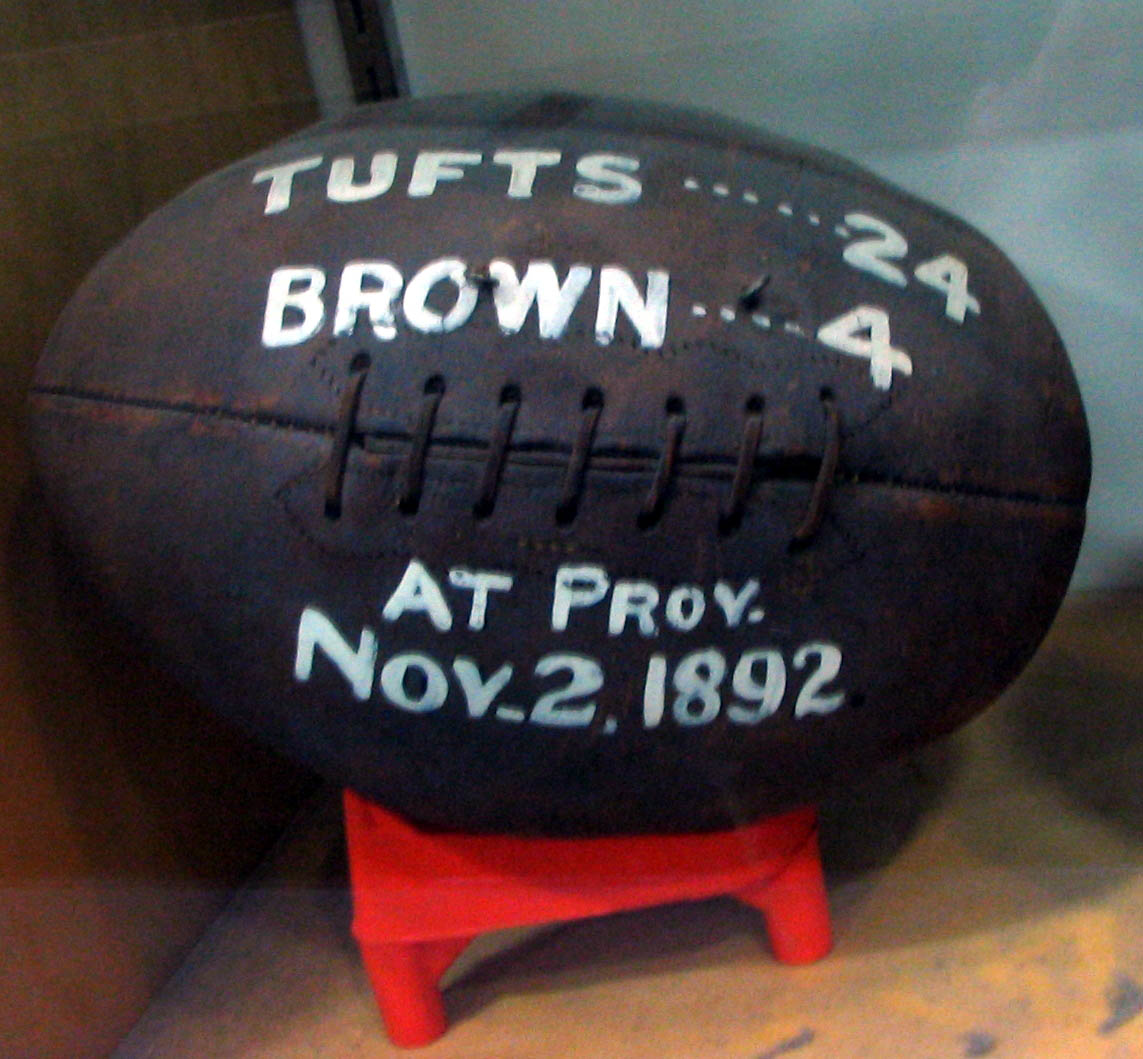
American football

== Physics ==
In sports, many modern balls are pressurized. Some are pressurized at the factory (e.g. tennis, squash) and others are pressurized by users (e.g. volleyball, basketball, football). Almost all pressurized balls gradually leak air. If the ball is factory pressurized, there is usually a rule about whether the ball retains sufficient pressure to remain playable. Depressurized balls lack bounce and are often termed "dead". In extreme cases, a dead ball becomes flaccid. If the ball is pressured on use, there are generally rules about how the ball is pressurized before the match, and when (or whether) the ball can be repressurized or replaced. Due to the ideal gas law, ball pressure is a function of temperature, generally tracking ambient conditions. Softer balls that are struck hard (especially squash balls) increase in temperature due to inelastic collision. On the contrary, in certain sports ball is solid, some with uniform material (e.g. most hockey variations, lacrosse), others with different layered materials (e.g. baseball, cricket). Finally, some sports use hollow ones (e.g. sepaktakraw, pickleball, floorball).

Cross section of sport balls

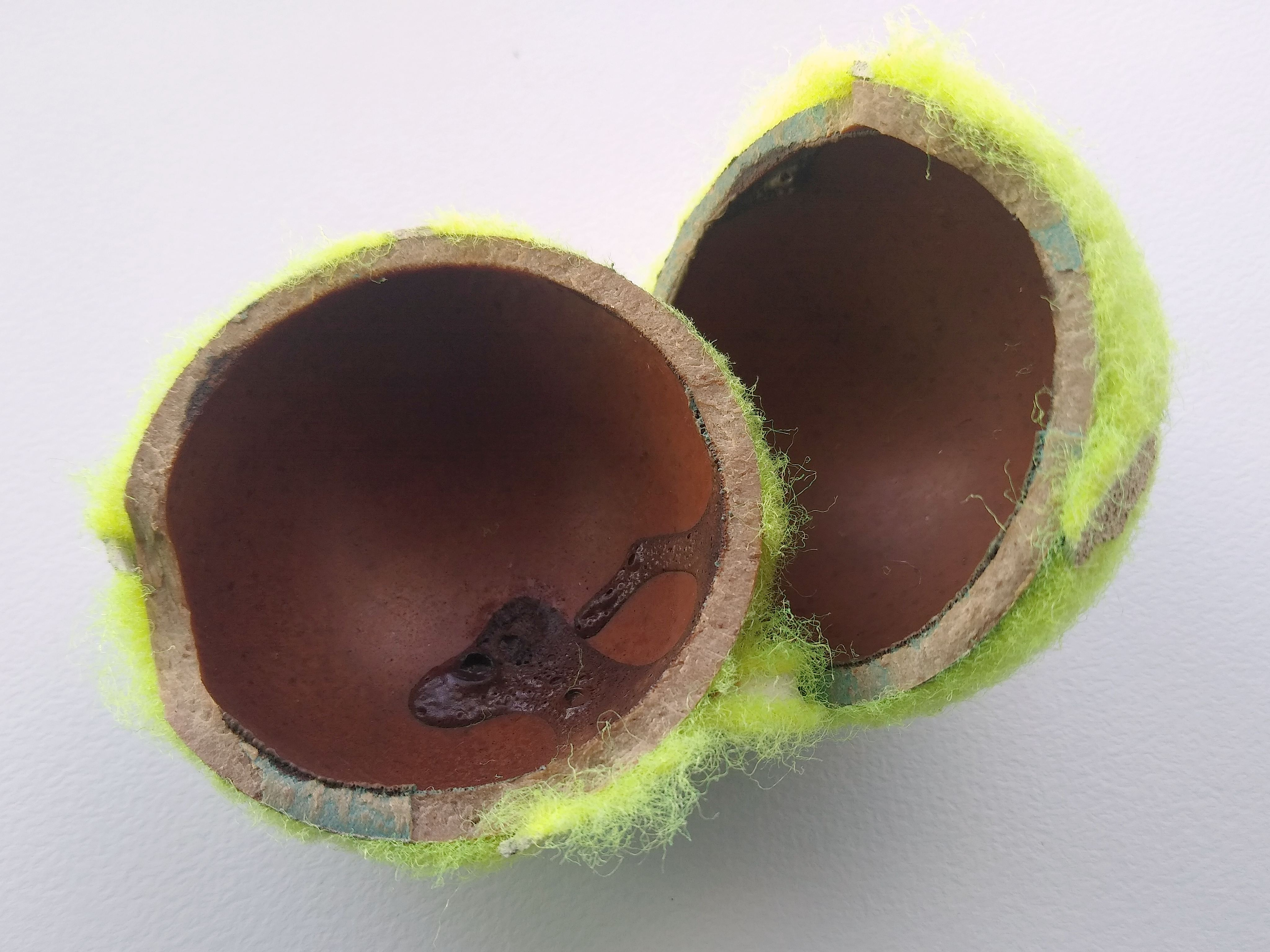
Tennis

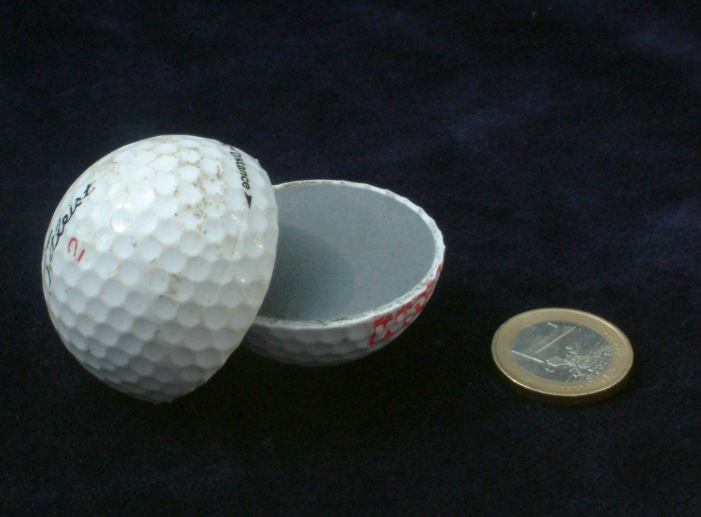
Golf

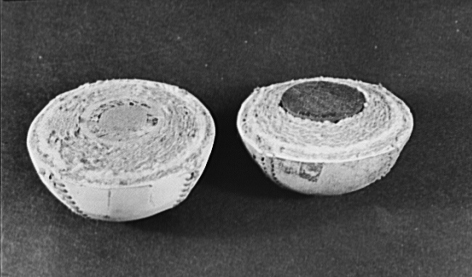
Baseball

In outdoor sports, wet balls play differently than dry balls. In indoor sports, balls may become damp due to hand sweat. Any form of humidity or dampness will affect a ball's surface friction, which will alter a player's ability to impart spin on the ball. The action required to apply spin to a ball is governed by the physics of angular momentum. Spinning balls travelling through air (technically a fluid) will experience the Magnus effect, which can produce lateral deflections in addition to the normal up-down curvature induced by a combination of wind resistance and gravity.

== Specifications ==
Sport	Regulated by	Type	Shape	Circumference	Diameter	Weight	Pressure	Bounce	Material	Panels	Image
Bat and ball sports
Baseball	WBSC	Solid	Sphere	9–9.25 inches (22.9–23.5 cm)	-	5–5.25 ounces (142–149 g)	-		cork or rubber (core); yarn; white horsehide or cowhide (case)	2	
Softball	WBSC	Solid	Sphere	11.875–12.125 inches (30.16–30.80 cm)	-	6.25–7 ounces (177–198 g)	-	0.47 e	long fiber kapok, mixture of cork and rubber or polyurethane mixture (core); twisted yarn and covered with latex or rubber cement; horsehide or cowhide (case)	2	
Baseball5	WBSC	Filled with air, non inflatable	Sphere	20.84 centimeters	6.64 centimeters	84,8 grams	7.99 kilograms-force (78.4 N; 17.6 lbf) (to press the ball into the center of inside by 30%)	76 centimeters (from 150 centimeters in height, drop to marble floor)	natural rubber	-	
Pêl-Fas	IBB	Solid	Sphere	8.5–9 inches (22–23 cm)	-	4.5–5 ounces (130–140 g)				2	
Pesäpallo	Finnish Pesäpallo Association	Solid	Sphere	21.6–22.2 centimetres (8.5–8.7 in)	-	160–165 grams (5.6–5.8 oz)				2	
Cricket	ICC	Solid	Sphere	8.81–9 inches (22.4–22.9 cm)	-	5.5–5.75 ounces (156–163 g)	-			4	
Oină	Romanian Oină Federation	Solid	Sphere	24 centimeters	8 centimeters	140 grams			livestock hair; leather (case)	8	
Schlagball		Filled with air, non inflatable	Sphere	19-21 centimeters	-	70-85 grams	-		red leather covered		
Stoolball	Stoolball England	Solid	Sphere	7–7.5 inches (18–19 cm)	-	2.5–3 ounces (71–85 g)				2	2
Boules
Boccia	BISFed	Solid	Sphere	26.2-27.8 cm	-	263-287 grams	-		vinyl, polyurethane fabric, leather, synthetic leather, suede	12 (pentagons)	
Bocce volo (bowl)	WPBF	Solid	Sphere	-	8.9-11.1 centimeters	900-1200 grams	-		metal or synthetic	-	
Bocce volo (jack)	WPBF	Solid	Sphere	-	3.5-3.7 centimeters	23-27 grams	-		wood	-	
Petanque (boule)	WPBF	Solid	Sphere	-	7.05-8 centimeters	650-800 grams	-		metal	-	
Petanque (jack)	WPBF	Solid	Sphere	-	2.9-3.1 centimeters	10-18 grams	-		wood or synthetic	-	
Raffa (bowl)	WPBF	Solid	Sphere	-	10.55-10.75 centimeters	895-925 grams	-		synthetic	-	
Raffa (pallino)	WPBF	Solid	Sphere	-	3.9-4.1 centimeters	83-97 grams	-		synthetic	-	
Cue sports
Carom	WCBS	Solid	Sphere	-	6.1-6.15 centimeters	205-220 grams	-			-	
Pool	WCBS	Solid	Sphere	-	2.25–2.3 inches (5.7–5.8 cm)	5.5–6 ounces (160–170 g)	-		cast phenolic resin plastic	-	
Snooker	WCBS	Solid	Sphere	-	5.2-5.3 centimeters	-	-			-	
Football codes
American	IFAF	Inflatable	Lemon	28–28.5 inches (71–72 cm) (longitudinal) × 21–21.25 inches (53.3–54.0 cm) (transversal)	11–11.25 inches (27.9–28.6 cm) (longitudinal)	14–15 ounces (400–430 g)	12.5–13.5 pounds per square inch (86–93 kPa)		urethane (bladder), case (leather)	4	
Canadian	Football Canada	Inflatable	Lemon	27.75–28.5 inches (70.5–72.4 cm) (longitudinal) 20.75–21.375 inches (52.71–54.29 cm) (transversal)	10.875–11.4375 inches (27.623–29.051 cm) (longitudinal) 6.25–6.75 inches (15.9–17.1 cm) (transversal)	14–15 ounces (400–430 g)	12.5–13.5 pounds per square inch (86–93 kPa)			4	
Soccer	FIFA	Inflatable	Sphere	27–28 inches (69–71 cm)	-	14–16 ounces (400–450 g)	8.5–15.6 pounds per square inch (59–108 kPa)	-	-	Typically 32: 20 hexagons; 12 pentagons	
Beach soccer	FIFA	Inflatable	Sphere	68-70 centimeters	-	400-440 grams	0.4–0.6 standard atmospheres (41–61 kPa)	-	-	Typically 32: 20 hexagons; 12 pentagons	
Futsal	FIFA	Inflatable	Sphere	62-64 centimeters	-	400-440 grams	0.6–0.9 standard atmospheres (61–91 kPa)	50-65 centimeters on the first rebound when dropped from a height of 2 meters	-	Typically 32: 20 hexagons; 12 pentagons	
Australian rules	AFL Commission	Inflatable	Prolate spheroid	72 – 73 cm (elliptic) × 54.5 -55.5 cm (circular)	-	-	69 kilopascals		-	4	
Gaelic and International rules	GAA	Inflatable	Sphere	68-70 centimeters	-	480-500 grams	9–10 pounds per square inch (62–69 kPa)	0.5222-0.576 e when dropped from 1.8 meters	-	18	
Rugby league	IRL	Inflatable	Prolate spheroid						leather	4	
Rugby union	World Rugby	Inflatable	Prolate spheroid	74 - 77 centimeters (elliptic) × 58 - 62 centimeters (circular)	28-30 centimeters (longitudinal)	410 - 460 grams	9.5–10 pounds per square inch (66–69 kPa)		leather or synthetic material	4	
Handball
Indoor (with resine)	IHF	Inflatable	Sphere	58-60 centimeters	-	425-475 grams			leather or synthetic	32 (20 hexagons and 12 pentagons)	
Indoor (without resine)	IHF	Inflatable	Sphere	55.5-57.5 centimeters	-	400-425 grams			leather or synthetic	32 (20 hexagons and 12 pentagons)	
Beach	IHF	Inflatable	Sphere	54-56 centimeters	-	350-370 grams			rubber	32 (20 hexagons and 12 pentagons)	
Hockey
Ball hockey	ISBHF		Sphere	-	6.6-7 centimeters	60-77 grams				-	
Bandy and Rink bandy	FIB	Solid	Sphere	-	6.1-6.5 centimeters	60-65 grams	-	15-30 centimeters on ice dropped from height of 1.5 meters	-	-	
Field and indoor	FIH	Solid	Sphere	22.4-23.5 centimeters	-	156-163 grams	-		-	-	
Beach	FIH		Sphere	45 centimeters	-	140-250 grams	-		-	-	
Floorball	IFF	Hollow	Sphere	-	7.1-7.3 centimeters	22-24 grams	-	74-84 centimeters		-	
Roller	World Skate	Solid	Sphere	-	7.2 centimeters	145-155 grams	-		pressed rubber/plastic	-	
Lacrosse
Field and Box	World Lacrosse	Solid	Sphere	7.75–8 inches (19.7–20.3 cm)	-	5–5.25 ounces (142–149 g)	-	45–49 inches (110–120 cm) on wooden floor from height of 72 inches (180 cm)	rubber	-	
Sixes	World Lacrosse	Solid	Sphere	19.7-20.3 centimeters	-	-	-		elastomeric	-	
Women	World Lacrosse	Solid	Sphere	20-20.3 centimeters	-	142-149 grams	-	1.1-1.3 meters on wooden floor dropped from height of 1.8 meters	elastomeric	-	
Intercrosse			Sphere	23-25 centimeters	-	80-100 grams	-		rubber	-	
Polo
Polo	FIP	Solid	Sphere	-	3–3.5 inches (7.6–8.9 cm)	3.5–4.75 ounces (99–135 g)	-			-	
Arena	FIP		Sphere	12.5–16.5 inches (32–42 cm)	-	130-182 grams		from 9 feet (2.7 m) on concrete at 70 °F (21 °C), 54–64 inches (140–160 cm) rebound		-	
Racquet sports
Pickleball	Multiple	Hollow	Sphere	-	2.87 and 2.97 inches (73 and 75 mm)	.78 and .935 ounces (22.1 and 26.5 g)		30 to 34 inches (760 to 860 mm) when dropped from a height of 78 inches (2,000 mm)	Molded material with a smooth surface with between 26 and 40 evenly spaced circular holes	-	
Squash	WSF	Filled with air, non inflatable	Sphere	-	3.95-4.05 centimeters	23-25 grams			-	-	
Table tennis	ITTF	Filled with air, non inflatable	Sphere	-	4 centimeters	2.7 grams	-		plastic	-	
Tennis	ITF	Filled with air, non inflatable	Sphere	-	6.54–6.86 centimetres (2.57–2.70 in)	56–59.4 grams (1.98–2.10 oz)	1 pound per square inch (6.9 kPa)	54–60 inches (140–150 cm)		2	
Volleyball
Volleyball	FIVB	Inflatable	Sphere	65-67 centimeters	-	260 - 280 grams	4.26–4.61 pounds per square inch (29.4–31.8 kPa)		rubber (bladder), leather or synthetic leather (case)	18	
Beach and Snow	FIVB	Inflatable	Sphere	66-68 centimeters	-	260 - 280 grams	17.1-22.1 kilopascals		rubber (bladder), leather or synthetic leather (case)		
Other
Basketball	FIBA	Inflatable	Sphere	75-77 centimeters	-	580-620 grams		1.035-1.085 meters dropped from height of 1.8 meters	leather, artificial/composite/synthetic leather	12	
Bowling	IBF	Solid	Sphere	26.704–27.002 inches (67.83–68.59 cm)	8.5–8.595 inches (21.59–21.83 cm)	16 pounds (7,300 g)	-		non-metallic	-	
Cycle ball	UCI		Sphere	-	17-18 centimeters	500-600 grams	-		textile (case)		
Dodgeball	WDA	Inflatable	Sphere	-	7 inches (18 cm)		1.6–1.8 pounds per square inch (0.11–0.12 bar)		textile (case)		
Fistball	IFA	Inflatable	Sphere	65-68 centimeters	-	340-360 grams	0.55–0.7 bars (55–70 kPa)				
Gaelic games	GAA	Solid	Sphere	-	69–72 millimetres (2.7–2.8 in)	110-116 grams	-		leather (case)	2	
Goalball	IBSA	Hollow	Sphere	75.5-78.5 centimeters	24-25 centimeters	1200-1300 grams			natural rubber with internal bells		
Golf	IGF	Solid	Sphere	-	1.68 inches (4.3 cm)	1.62 ounces (46 g)	-		elastomeric material	-	
Korfball	IKF	Inflatable	Sphere	68-70.5 centimeters	-	445-475 grams		110-130 centimeters (from 180 centimeters in height)			
Netball	World Netball	Inflatable	Sphere	27–28 inches (69–71 cm)	-	14–16 ounces (400–450 g)			leather, rubber or synthetic material.		
Rhythmic gymnastics	World Gymnastics		Sphere	56.5-62.8 centimeters	18-20 centimeters	400 grams minimum			Rubber or soft plastic	-	
Sepaktakraw	ISTAF	Hollow	Sphere	41-43 centimeters	-	170-180 grams	-		woven synthetic fiber	-	
Shinty	Camanachd Association	Solid	Sphere	7.5–8 inches (19–20 cm)	-	2.5–3 ounces (71–85 g)	-		cork or rubber (core); worted; leather or leather-like (case)	2	
Tchoukball	FITB	Inflatable	Sphere	58-60 centimeters	-	425-475 grams				32 (20 hexagons and 12 pentagons)	
Teqball	FITEQ	Inflatable	Sphere	67-69 centimeter	-	370-400 grams	0.3–0.5 standard atmospheres (30–51 kPa)		leather or leather-like (case); latex (bladder)		
Waterpolo and Canoe Polo	World Aquatics and ICF	Inflatable	Sphere	68-71 centimeters	-	400-450 grams	7.5–8.5 pounds per square inch (52–59 kPa)				

== See also ==
- Ball (mathematics)
- Buckminster Fullerene "Bucky balls"
- Dryer ball, used in a tumbling dryer
- Football (ball)
- Hockey puck, can also spin, bounce, and roll
- Marbles
- Penny floater
- Shuttlecock
- Super Ball
