= Knattleikr =

Ancient Icelandic ball game

Knattleikr (Old Icelandic for "ball-game") is an ancient Norse ball game mentioned in the Sagas of Icelanders. Ball games of the kind are recorded from across the world (cf. Older Swedish: väderboll, lit. 'air ball', isboll, lit. 'ice ball'; English medieval football, hockey, etc.), and ultimately led to various modern sports.

The term is also applied to a modern sport created by re-enactors, and now played at a few United States institutions as a college club sport, based on what is known about the historical game.

== Gameplay ==
The game was probably similar to early versions of the Irish sport of hurling, which also dates to antiquity. The exact rules of Knattleikr are lost, but some information has survived from the Viking Age in Iceland (beginning around the 9th century).

Players were divided into teams, each with a captain. The game demanded so much time that it was played from morning to night. It was a spectator game, with tournaments drawing huge crowds from all over Iceland.

Gameplay involved a hardball being hit by a stick, although players could also use their hands. Body contact was allowed in the fight for the ball where the strongest had the best chance to win. Thus, intimidation was a vital ingredient; several wars of words have been recorded in the old sagas. There were penalties and a penalty box.

A conjecture assumes that the playing field was lined, usually played on a flat ice‐covered surface, e.g. a frozen pond (though bumpy, land‐based ice, svell, is also mentioned). The Vikings may have used tar and sand under the soles of their boots for traction.

== Revival ==
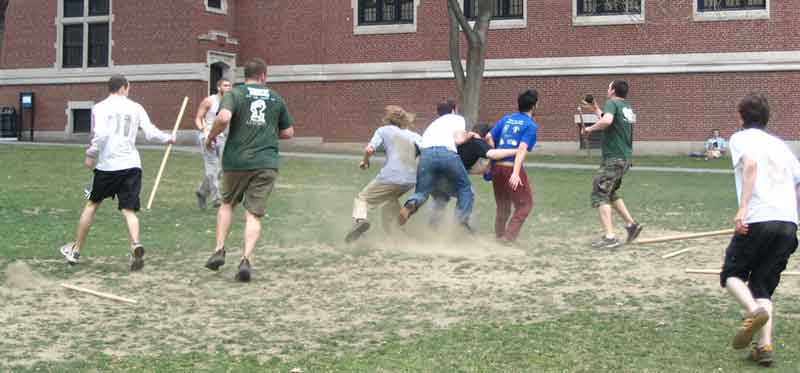
Knattleikr game at Clark University.

Today, knattleikr is often re-enacted at medieval fairs and by Norse culture enthusiasts. It is also played on some college campuses. Brandeis University, Clark University, Providence College, and Yale University in particular are known for their teams. The first annual New England intercollegiate knattleikr competition (right) was played in April, 2007 at Clark University between Clark's team and Brandeis.

The New England Viking reenactment group cautions that the game is dangerous and refers to the Icelandic Grágás laws that a player may leave the game at any time.

The 2022 film The Northman depicts a game of knattleikr.

== Historical references ==
The most complete descriptions of the game are to be found in the following Icelandic sagas:

- Grettis saga chapter 15
- Gísla saga chapters 15 and 18
- Egils saga chapter 40
- Eyrbyggja saga chapter 43
- Vápnfirðinga saga chapter 4

== See also ==
- La Soule, played by the Norsemen of Normandy and Brittany.
- Broomball, a modern Canadian version.
- Episkyros, an Ancient Greek ball game.
- Harpastum a Roman ball game, a word probably derived from harpago, to snatch or take by violence.
- Trigon, a Roman ball game.
- Cuju, a Chinese ball game originally used to prepare soldiers for battle.
- Hurling, a game played in Ireland which involves similar stick and ball play.
- Shinty, a game played in Scotland which involves similar stick and ball play.
- History of physical training and fitness
