= Rugby union in Italy =

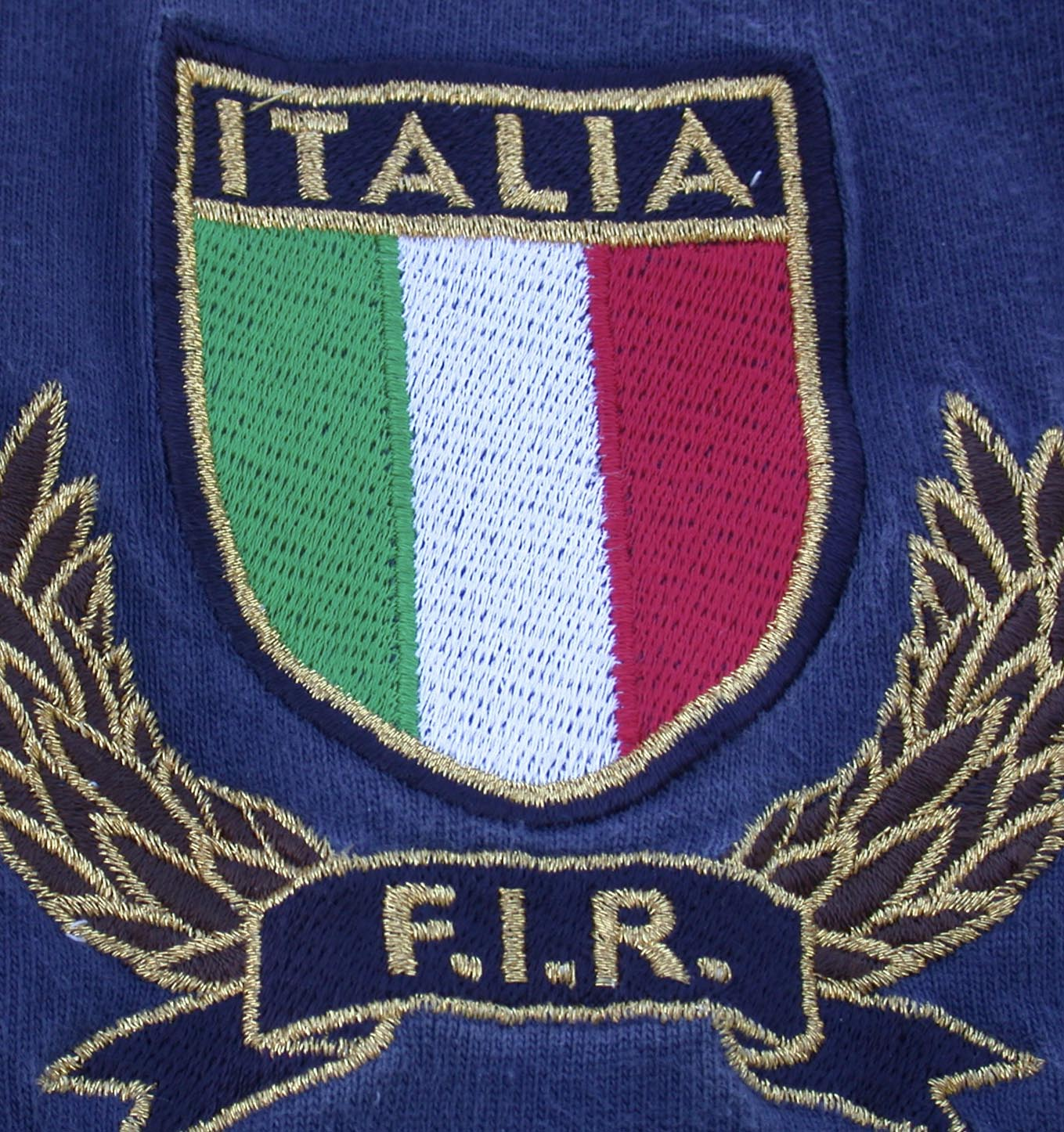
- The badge on the national uniform
- Country: Italy
- Governing body: Italian Rugby Federation
- National team: Italy
- Nickname: Azzurri
- First played: early 1900s
- Registered players: 153,176 (total)
- Clubs: 1,024

National competitions
- Rugby World Cup; Six Nations Championship; Rugby World Cup Sevens; World Rugby Sevens Series

Club competitions
- European Rugby Champions Cup; European Rugby Challenge Cup; United Rugby Championship; Top12; Coppa Italia; Campionati Nazionali

Rugby union in Italy is governed by the Italian Rugby Federation.

Rugby was introduced into Italy in the early 1900s. It is also known as pallovale or palla ovale ("oval ball") within Italy. Two Italian professional teams (Benetton Treviso and Zebre Parma) compete in United Rugby Championship (URC), a league that also includes sides from Ireland, Scotland, South Africa and Wales. As URC teams, the two professional teams take part in EPCR elite continental competitions annually, either in the European Rugby Champions Cup or the second tier European Rugby Challenge Cup. The Top12 is the main purely national club competition.

Internationally, Italy competes in all three formats (men's, men's under-20 and women's) of the Six Nations Championship, the cross-continental Nations Championship and the women's comparator, the WXV, and both the men's Rugby World Cup and the women's version. It also takes part in various sevens competition for both sexes as well as competitions for underage teams.

Italy is classified as a 'tier one' nation by World Rugby (formerly the International Rugby Board).

== Governing body ==
The governing body of Italian rugby union is the Federazione Italiana Rugby (FIR). An original organisational committee was established in 1911, although it was in 1928 when the body became the FIR, and in 1987, it joined the International Rugby Board. In 1934 the FIR became a founding member of the Federation Internationale de Rugby Amateur.

== Popularity ==
There are 1,024 rugby clubs within Italy. These clubs support 153,173 registered male players, as well as 8,118 registered female players.

Many teams are either from Veneto or Lombardy in the north of Italy as this area, closer to traditional power France, has the highest rugby popularity however the sport has achieved national presence as it is played and followed throughout the country. Rugby is now estimated to be the third most popular team sport in Italy behind football and basketball.

Italian players also play for other European rugby clubs, such as those in the PREM Rugby League, and the French Top 14.

== History ==
=== Prehistory ===
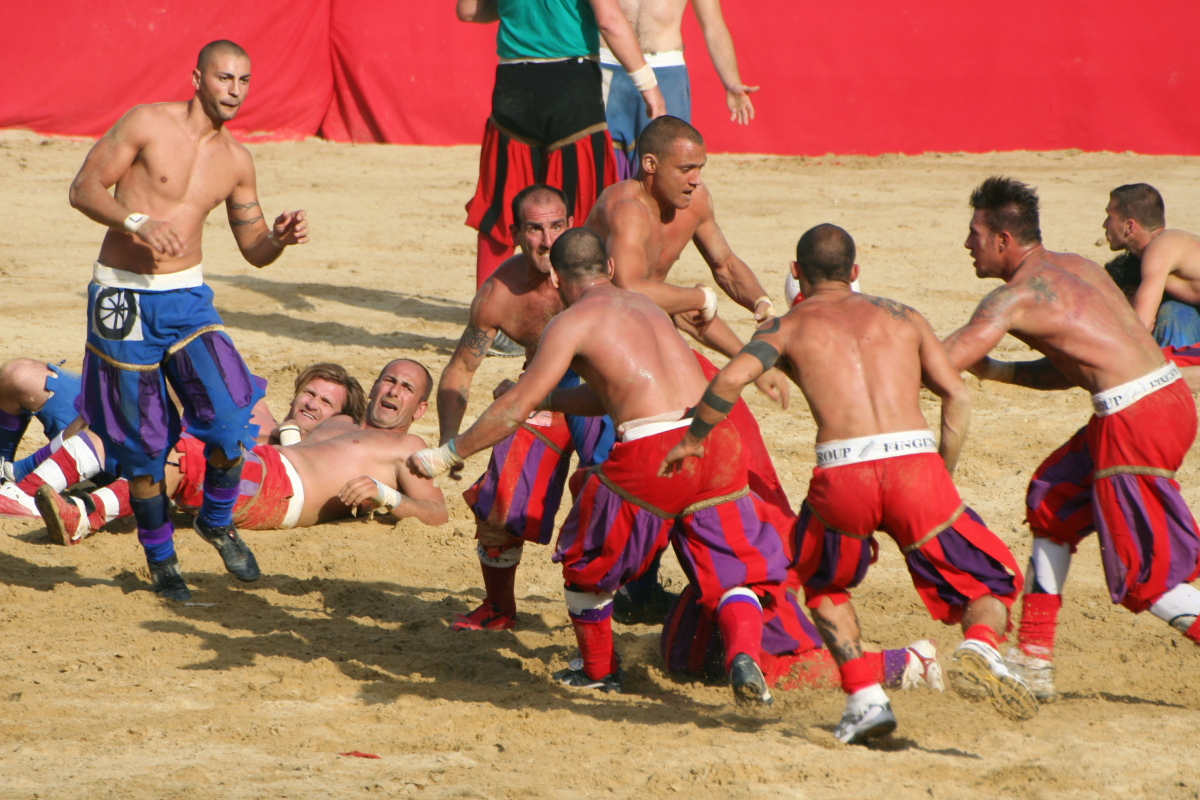
A match of Calcio Storico Fiorentino, in Florence, sometimes seen as a parallel development to rugby

The remote ancestry of rugby has been linked to a Roman game known as harpastum, which spread throughout their Empire, include the province of Britannia. Athenaeus writes:

"Harpastum, which used to be called Phaininda, is the game I like most of all. Great are the exertion and fatigue attendant upon contests of ball-playing, and violent twisting and turning of the neck. Hence Antiphanes, "Damn it, what a pain in the neck I've got." He describes the game thus: "He seized the ball and passed it to a team-mate while dodging another and laughing. He pushed it out of the way of another. Another fellow player he raised to his feet. All the while the crowd resounded with shouts of Out of bounds, Too far, Right beside him, Over his head, On the ground, Up in the air, Too short, Pass it back in the scrum."

Galen, in On Exercise with the Small Ball, describes Harpastum as:

"better than wrestling or running because it exercises every part of the body, takes up little time, and costs nothing", it was "profitable training in strategy", and could be "played with varying degrees of strenuousness". Galen adds, "When, for example, people face each other, vigorously attempting to prevent each other from taking the space between, this exercise is a very heavy, vigorous one, involving much use of the hold by the neck, and many wrestling holds."

This game was apparently a Romanized version of a Greek game called phaininda. The general impression from ancient descriptions is of a game quite similar to rugby. Additional descriptions suggest a line was drawn in the dirt, and that the teams would endeavor to keep the ball behind their side of the line and prevent the opponents from reaching it. This seems rather like an 'inverted' form of football. If the opponents had the ball on their side of the line, the objective would seem to be to get in and "pass" it to another player, or somehow get it back over the line.

Another remote Roman ancestor of rugby may be a game called trigon, which involved three players passing a ball to one another by hand. The ball was usually small and hard, but occasionally it was a follis or large bladder-ball.

Italy is home to a number of forms of traditional football, some of which have features which are more similar to rugby, than to association football, such as handling the ball. A prime example of this is Calcio Storico Fiorentino played in Florence. The Piazza Santa Croce of Florence is the cradle of this sport, that became known as giuoco del calcio fiorentino ("Florentine kick game") or simply calcio ("kick"). The first official rules of calcio fiorentino were recorded in 1580, although the game had been developing around Florence for some time before that date. The game involved teams of 27 kicking and carrying a ball in a giant sandpit set up in the Piazza Santa Croce in the centre of Florence, both teams aiming for their designated point on the perimeter of the sandpit.

=== Early history ===
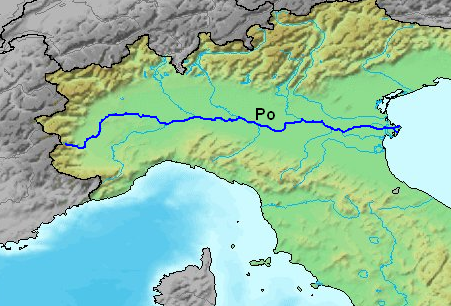
The Po Valley in Northern Italy is frequently seen as Italian rugby's traditional heartland.

British communities brought rugby to Genoa between 1890 and 1895, with other games in Italy around 1909. The society that organised the first games dissolved soon after them.

Italian rugby's traditional heartland consists of the small country towns in the Po Valley and other parts of Northern Italy. Some believe that Italian workers returning from France, particularly the south, introduced the game and gave it a significant rural/working class base, which still exists in towns such as Treviso and Rovigo. A demonstration game was also played in 1910 in Turin between SCUF and Servette of Geneva. French students also introduced the game to Milan University c. 1911. While each of these events has been hailed as the "origin of Italian rugby", it seems that they probably happened more or less simultaneously and independent of one another, and that the introduction of rugby to Italy was a series of events, rather than a single starting point. Whatever the ultimate origins of the game in northern Italy, the region's proximity to the French rugby heartland helped as well.

The first match played by a representative Italian XV was in 1911, between US Milanese and Voiron of France. On 25 July of the same year the "Propaganda Committee" was formed which in 1928 became the Federazione Italiana Rugby (FIR).

An original organisational committee was established in 1911, although it was in 1928 when the body became the FIR.

=== 1920s and Fascist period ===
The national team played their first game in May 1929 in Barcelona where they lost 0-9 against Spain. A week later, a rematch was held in Milan, where Italy beat Spain 3-0. There was a further game in 1928 when Ambrosiana Milano beat R.C.T. Bucharest 15-3.

The first Italian championship, won by Ambrosiana Milano, took place in 1929, with 6 of the 16 teams that existed in Italy.

In 1934 the FIR became founding members of FIRA (Fédération Internationale de Rugby Amateur) along with the national teams of Italy, France, Spain, Czechoslovakia, Romania and Germany. In 1936 Italy took part in the Fira European Tournament, in Berlin, along with France, Germany and Romania and in 1937, in Paris, along with France, Germany, Romania, Belgium and the Netherlands.

Rugby union spread to other parts of Italy, especially the cities of Rome, Bologna, Padua, Naples, Brescia, Turin and Parma. France was the first of the Championship countries to play Italy at senior level and the inaugural match took place in 1937, France winning 43-5.

The Fascist dictator Benito Mussolini rebranded rugby union as palla ovale ("oval ball"), deciding it was an evolution of the Roman game harpastum. The game was used as a vehicle for Fascist unity, and by 1927 rugby union had its own propaganda committee. However, Mussolini found rugby union inconveniently resistant to authority and dropped the sport, and for Fascist purposes turned to volata, a malleable kind of handball. Volata never caught on and in 1933 the effort was officially abandoned, however the invention of the game proved damaging to rugby union's popularity and place in Italian sporting culture. After the decline of the volata project, his supporters turned back to rugby in the years leading up to the Second World War as an alternative to soccer, which they saw as an effete English influence. However, despite this far right involvement, Italian rugby managed to escape too much of an association with the regime.

=== Post-war period ===
The Second World War interrupted Italian rugby union, as it did in other rugby-playing nations. Post-war, there was a desire to return to normality and Italian rugby union entered a new dimension thanks to the help of Allied troops in Italy. Very soon the Veneto (Rovigo, Padua and Treviso) came to assume a prominent position in the Italian rugby union scene earning the name "Republic of the Italian rugby union". Parma and L'Aquila also became main centres for rugby union.

In the 1960s the Italian Rugby Union had their rival sport, rugby league, hampered by threatening to ban rugby league players from playing rugby union for life.

=== 1980s and 1990s ===
In the 1980s, a peculiar set of economic circumstances arose, which helped bolster the game further. In an effort to promote the game, sinking money into rugby became virtually tax-free, and large amounts of sponsorship money went into the game, from companies as large as Benetton which set up their own club sides. Benetton Treviso for example was able to use this money to produce a dramatic rise in standards. Players of Italian ancestry from Australia and Argentina were brought in, and the likes of Frano Botica, David Campese, John Kirwan and Michael Lynagh plied their trade in Italy's top flight. Although the rise in standards was not immediate, the influx of money helped buy in some top foreign coaches such as Mark Ella and Bernard Fourcarde, which allowed them to develop their own stars such as Massimo Giovanelli. This change for the better was reflected in their scorelines - for example, when the Italians played the All Blacks in 1987, they were humiliated 70-6, but when the All Blacks played them in 1991, they found themselves winning only 31-21 in a highly competitive match. Italy narrowly lost to the Australians 23-20 in 1994 (who at time were world champions) The next week Italy were again competitive and Australia struggled to a 20-7 victory.

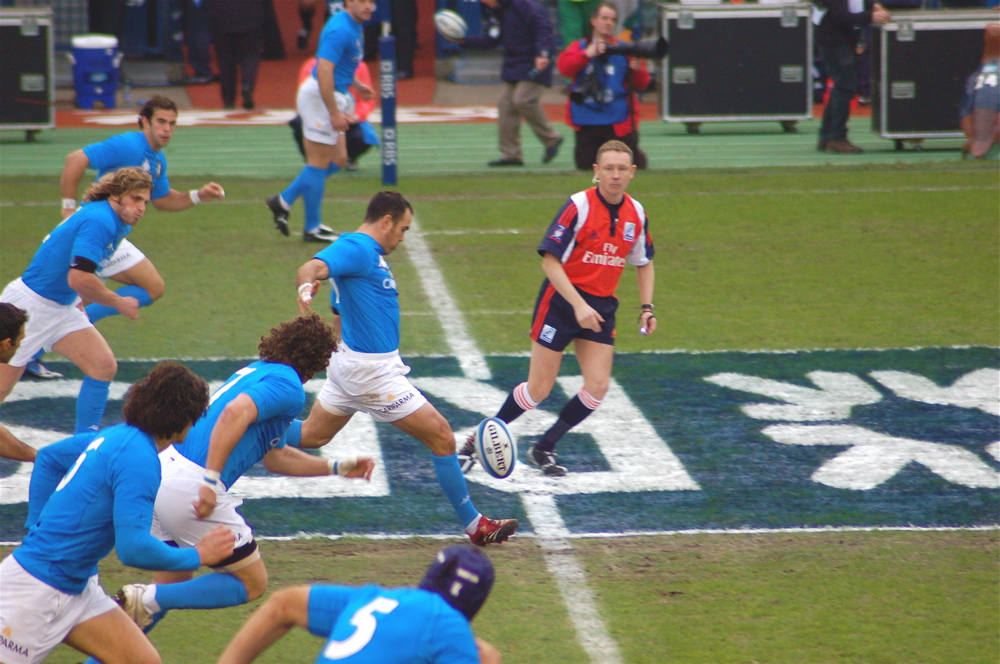
Italy kicking off against Scotland in their match at Murrayfield in the 2007 Six Nations Championship.

In 1987, the Federazione Italiana Rugby joined the International Rugby Board (IRB), now known as World Rugby. That same year, the national side were invited to compete in the first Rugby World Cup in 1987. Italy had to wait until 1988 to play their first Test against a Home Nation. In 1995, the national side finally got their first victory over a home nation, against Ireland in Treviso, in a Rugby World Cup warm up. In 1999, the domestic competition ran its 100th tournament, with Benetton Treviso winning the championship that year.

=== Present day ===
In 2000, Italy joined the Five Nations Championships, turning the competition into the Six Nations Championship. In the 2007, 2013 and 2026 Six Nations, Italy finished fourth, their best placing yet.

== National team ==
The locations of the Six Nations participants

The Italian national rugby union side have been playing international rugby since the late 1920s, and are categorized, by the International Rugby Board, as a tier one nation. They have competed in the Six Nations Championship since 2000 and at all the Rugby World Cups. Italy's best result at a Rugby World Cup was at the 2007 tournament in France, where they won two of their four pool matches and lost by two points to Scotland, narrowly missing the quarter-finals.

On St. Valentine's Day 2010, Italy lost narrowly to England in Rome (12-17), further consolidating Italy's rise in international rugby, and this rise continued with a 22-21 victory over France on 12 March 2011.

As of April 2024, the Italian national team is ranked 8th in the world, its joint highest ever ranking.

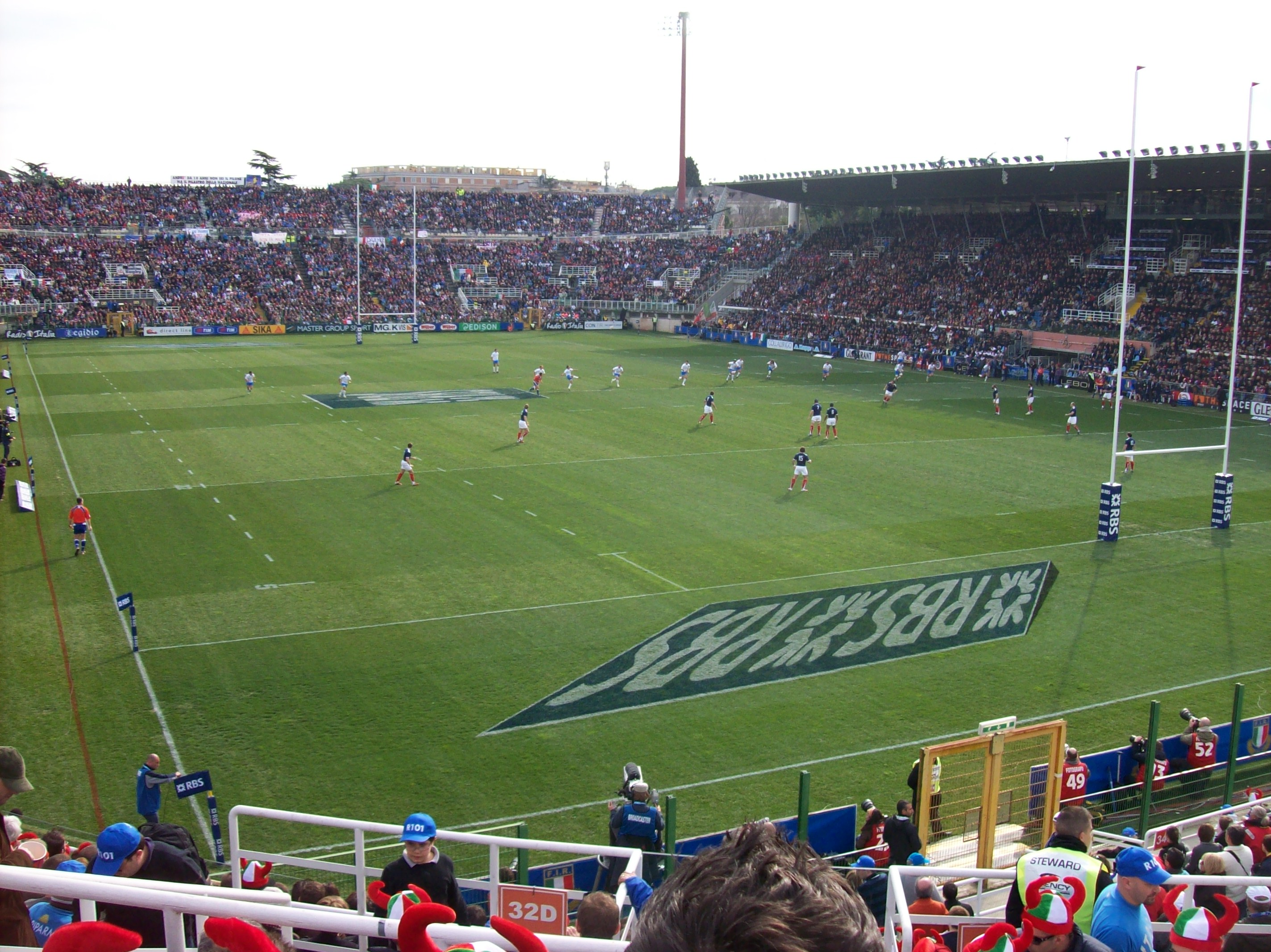
The Stadio Flaminio during a rugby union match in the 2011 Six Nations Championship between Italy and France, which resulted in an upset victory for Italy

Notable former Italian international players include:

- Mauro Bergamasco
- Mirco Bergamasco
- Carlo Checchinato
- Massimo Cuttitta
- Diego Domínguez
- Ivan Francescato
- Massimo Giovanelli
- Andrea Lo Cicero
- Martín Castrogiovanni
- Sergio Parisse
- Salvatore Perugini
- Alessandro Troncon
- Paolo Vaccari

Italy also has a national rugby sevens team.

=== Other tournaments ===
The World Rugby Nations Cup in Romania and World Rugby Tbilisi Cup in Georgia are tournaments involving the host teams and usually Tier One teams like Argentina XV and Emerging Italy and Tier Two teams like Portugal and Russia. Nations Cup was first held in 2006.

== Competitions ==
=== Domestic ===
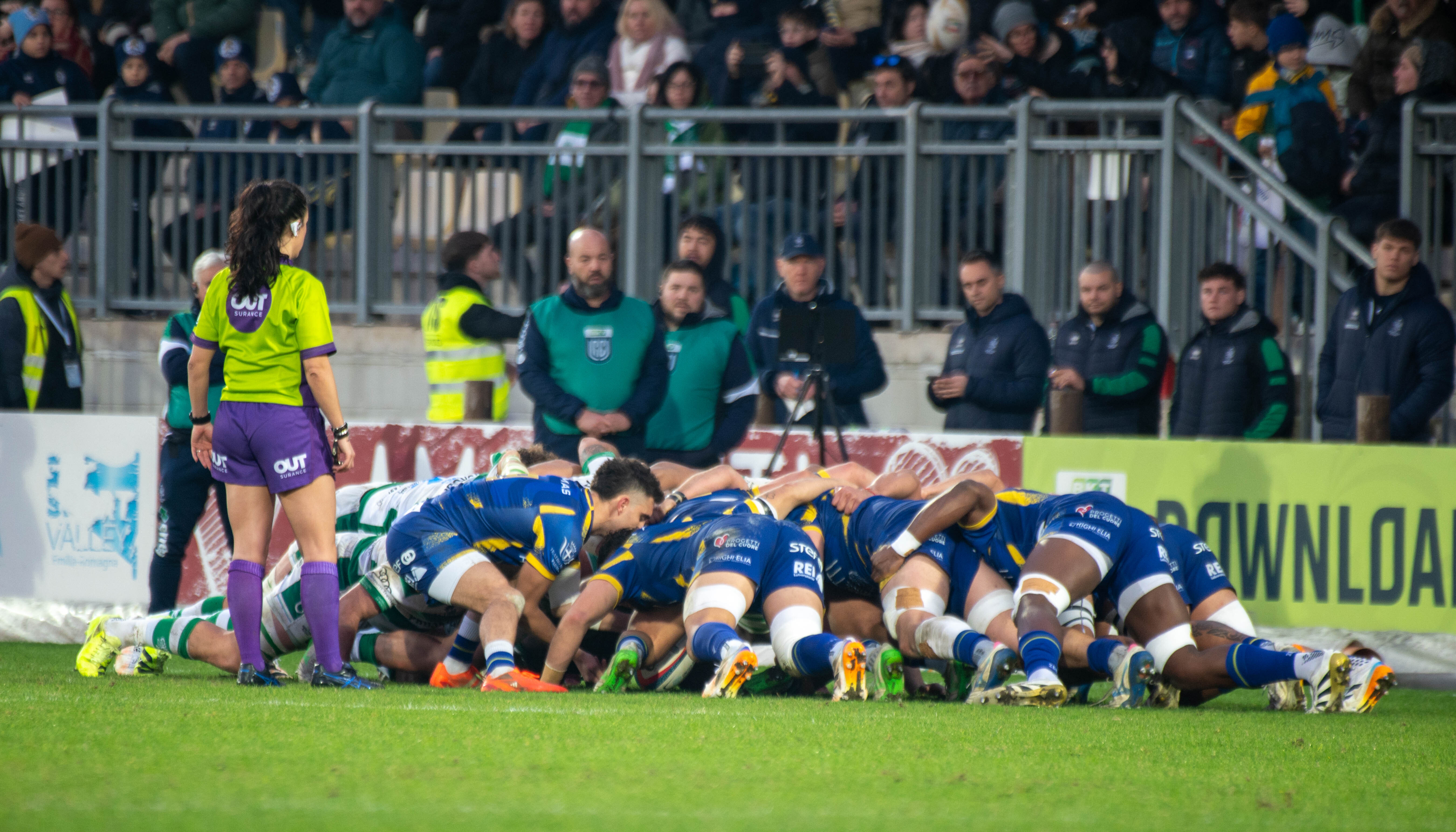
A scrum between Zebre Parma and Benetton in their Round 8 clash in the 2025–26 United Rugby Championship season, December 2025

Apart from the two Italian teams competing in the United Rugby Championship, European Rugby Champions Cup and European Rugby Challenge Cup, the Top12 is the main competition for rugby union clubs in Italy. The competition was first contested in 1929, with six clubs. It was altered in 2002 to include just the top 10 sides of Italy, and was extended to twelve teams in 2012/13. The competition runs from September to May. After a home-and-away season, the top four teams play a knock-out competition to decide the championship. The winners are awarded the Albo d'Oro trophy.

The current teams are:

- L'Aquila
- Calvisano
- Fiamme Oro
- Lazio
- Mogliano
- Petrarca
- Lyons Piacenza
- Rovigo Delta
- San Donà
- Viadana

Below the Top12, domestic Italian rugby is played in the Campionati Nazionali which consists of:

Serie A: divided into 4 pools of 6 teams who play each other home and away

Serie B: divided into 4 leagues of 12 teams who play each other home and away.

Serie C1.

Serie C2.

An Under 19 Championship and a female competition also exist.

The Coppa Italia is a knock-out competition for domestic clubs. The competition has been contested annually since 1967, though it was not held from 1974 to 1980, and 1983 to 1994, and again in 1996, 1999 and 2002. From 2010 it's renamed in Excellence Trophy.

=== European tournaments ===
==== Pro12 ====
Two Italian sides, Treviso and Aironi were admitted to the Pro12 on 8 March 2009, and started playing in the league from the 2010/11 season. The announcement by Celtic rugby followed a long period of negotiations and planning, starting with a tentative agreement in 2008 to admit two Italian sides. During 2009 the FIR organised a competition to choose which two sides would win the two places. This resulted in a team based in Rome winning one of the two places, despite the Italian rugby heartland being in the north. This decision was overturned after questions about the viability of the new franchise, with Treviso taking its place. Only after repeated assurances by the FIR of the ability of the two new sides to contribute financially to the league did Celtic rugby finally admit the two teams.

For the 2012/13 season, Aironi left the Pro12, and was replaced by Zebre, a team based in Parma.

==== Heineken Cup and European Rugby Champions Cup ====
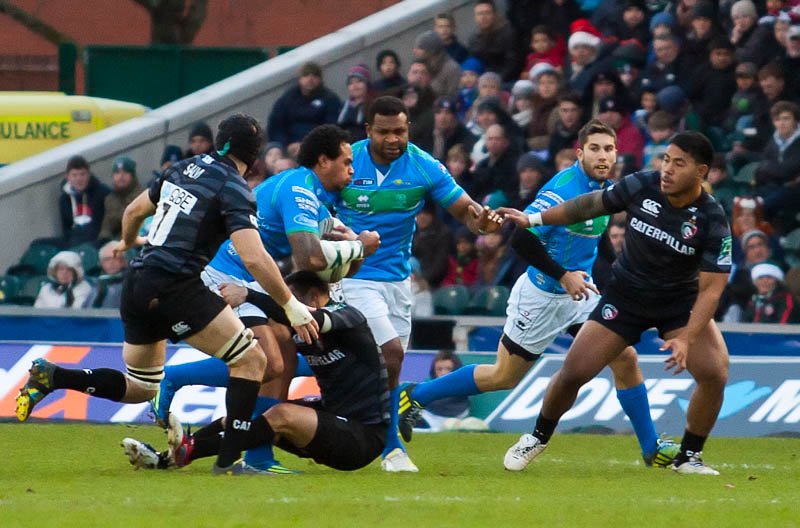
Benetton Treviso in blue take on English club Leicester Tigers during the 2012–13 Heineken Cup

Italy fielded teams in the European knock-out competition, the Heineken Cup, from its inception in 1995–96 through its final season of 2013–14. The Heineken Cup was an annual rugby union competition involving leading clubs, regional and provincial teams from the rest of the Six Nations: England, France, Scotland, Wales and Ireland. Through the 2009–10 season, Italy usually had two to three clubs in the Heineken Cup. Starting with the 2010–11 season, Italy's two Pro12 sides automatically entered the Heineken Cup.

Starting in 2014–15, the Heineken Cup has been replaced by the European Rugby Champions Cup. Italy is guaranteed one place in the Champions Cup; the Italian Pro12 team that finishes higher on the previous season's Pro12 table automatically qualifies. The second Italian Pro12 club can earn a Champions Cup place if it is one of the three highest-placed teams apart from the top team of each Pro12 country (Italy, Ireland, Scotland, Wales). Beginning with the 2014–15 season, the second Italian club has another path to the following season's Champions Cup—if it is one of the top two Pro12 teams that does not qualify for the Champions Cup, it will enter a play-off for a Champions Cup place that also involves the seventh-place sides from the English Premiership and Top 14.

==== European Challenge Cup and European Rugby Challenge Cup ====
The European Challenge Cup in rugby union, known as the Parker Pen Shield from 2001 to 2003, Parker Pen Challenge Cup from 2003 to 2005, and the Amlin Challenge Cup from 2009 to 2014, was the sister competition to the Heineken Cup. It was competed for by teams from England, France, Wales, Ireland, Scotland, Italy, and Romania (plus, in some years, Portugal and Spain) on a knock-out basis.

Italy entered 4 clubs: those finishing 1st to 4th in the Eccellenza. Clubs had previously competed in the European Shield, though that particular competition was restructured in 2005.

Starting in the 2014–15 season, the original Challenge Cup was replaced by the European Rugby Challenge Cup. Any Italian Pro12 team that does not qualify for the Champions Cup plays in the current Challenge Cup.

==== European Rugby Qualifying Competition ====
The introduction of the new European club competition structure for 2014–15 will see the creation of a completely new third-tier competition, the Qualifying Competition. The structure has not yet been announced, but it will involve the top four teams from the Eccellenza plus club sides from second-tier European rugby nations. These sides will compete for two places in the Challenge Cup.

== See also ==
- Italian Rugby Federation
- Italy national rugby union team
- United Rugby Championship
