= Follis (disambiguation) =

A follis was a type of Roman and Byzantine coin.

Follis may also refer to:

- Follis (ball game), or balloon, a Roman ball game
  - Follis (ball), a type of ball used in follis and other games
- Cycles Follis, a defunct French bicycle manufacturer

== People ==
- Arianna Follis (born 1977), Italian cross country skier
- Charles Follis (1879–1910), first black American football player

== See also ==
- Folli, a surname
