= Volata =

Italian 20th century ball game

Volata ("flow") is a code of football developed and promoted by Italian fascists for a brief period during the late 1920s and early 1930s, in an attempt to displace sports with non-Italian origins, such as association football and rugby union.

== History ==
Association football was popular in Italy when the fascists came to power in 1921. Rugby union was a new and relatively minor sport, but also growing in popularity. Although the fascists idealized association football for its contribution to physical fitness, it was also seen at the time as an "English game" (because the rules had been codified by the English Football Association and the first organized matches had taken place in England). The fascists generally distanced themselves from cultural practices with foreign roots.

Conversely, rugby was seen as a modern interpretation of the extinct Ancient Roman game of harpastum. By 1927, fascist propaganda actively promoted rugby, which it referred to as palla ovale ("oval ball"), but the Federazione Italiana Rugby proved resistant to manipulation and the fascists quickly ceased their support.

The national secretary of the Fascist Party, Augusto Turati, devised volata. Officially, the rules were based on long-extinct codes of football indigenous to Italy, especially the Roman harpastum and the medieval calcio fiorentino. Volata was contested by eight-member sides, with rules that were described by a 1929 propaganda newsreel from Istituto Luce as a "synthesis of the essential elements of the games of calcio and rugby" (sintesi di elementi essenziali del giuoco del calcio e del "rugby"). Use of the word "calcio" was ambiguous, as it was the usual name of association football, as well as calcio storico fiorentino, which in 1930 was also revived at the fascists' behest.

Promoted by fascist sporting and cultural organizations, volata enjoyed a brief phase of popularity. More than 100 volata clubs and a league were reportedly formed, but the enduring popularity of association football caused the fascists to change their attitude toward the sport.

In 1933, volata organizations and competitions were officially abandoned. Afterwards the fascists encouraged association football; Italy hosted and won the 1934 World Cup.

The popularity of rugby and its place within Italian sporting culture appear to have been reduced by the changing policies of the fascists, as well as the invention of volata. Nevertheless, rugby survived the fascist period and began to grow when Italy was occupied by British Commonwealth forces during 1943–47.

== Rules ==
The game was between two teams of 8 players each; 1 goalkeeper and 2 full-backs (who were not allowed to leave their own half), 3 half-backs, and 2 forwards. It required association football-sized ball and goals. It took place on a pitch of 90m x 60m, the only pitch markings being the half-way line and semi-oval penalty areas, 21m wide by 8m deep. Each game lasted 1 hour, divided into 20 minute thirds. No player could control the ball for more than three seconds, unless they were bouncing it in the style of a basketball dribble, and if they were holding the ball, tackling waist-high was legal. Scoring was via shots from outside the penalty area. By 1932 the game had evolved to being more akin to handball; players were not kicking the ball at all, but passing hand-to-hand and using hand-strikes to shoot, and the goals were reduced in width to 5 meters.

== See also ==
- Harpastum
- Calcio storico fiorentino
- History of association football in Italy
- History of rugby in Italy
