= Folli =

Folli is a surname and may refer to:

- Piero Folli (1881–1948), Italian antifascist parish priest
- Sebastiano Folli (1568–1621), Italian fresco painter

== See also ==
- Association for Logic, Language and Information or FoLLI, an international learned society
- Follis (disambiguation).
