= Follis (ball) =

Inflated ball used in sport

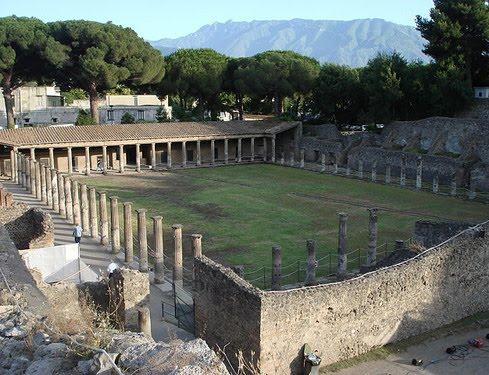
Palestra, or exercise yard, in Pompeii— a venue for follis games, among other pursuits

Follis (a term used in Ancient Rome), or Ball of wind (pilota de vent in Catalan), a term used in the 15th and 16th centuries in Spain and Italy, was a hollow ball inflated with air under pressure, able to jump and bounce when impacting at a certain speed with any solid body. Different types of balls of wind were commonly used to play a variety of ball games that were popular in that particular period of time.

Today, although many of the existing balls are inflated with air, the modern name is simplified to "ball" regardless of the system.

== History ==
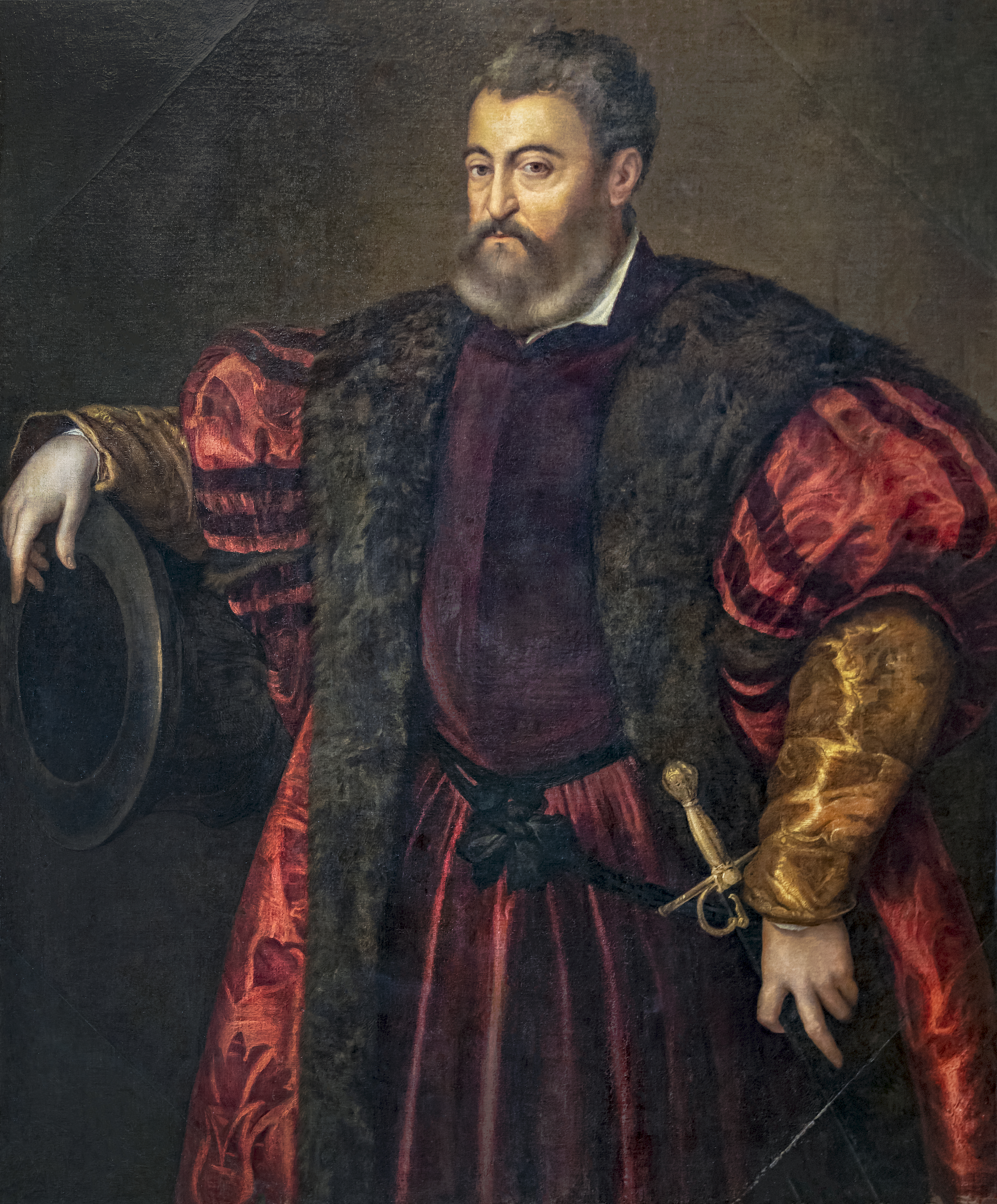
Portrait of Alfonso d'Este by Titian. Antonio Scaino dedicated his work on the ball game.

Ball games were played by the Greeks of Classical antiquity. Although it is unknown whether they used inflated balls, it is considered likely given the well documented use of "balls of wind" in Ancient Rome, with the larger balls called follis, and the smaller balls called follicis. Suetonius described a follis as a "ball of wind". An animal bladder was inflated to create a ball, preferably that of a pig.

In the Middle Ages, balls were mentioned by several authors such as Desiderius Erasmus, Rabelais, Calderon de la Barca, Baltasar de Castiglione, and Italian priest Antonio da Salò Scaino, writing about an early form of tennis. Alfonso X of Castile banned the juego de pelota (lit. 'ball game') with imprisonment. Early Spanish chroniclers in Mexico compared the different consistencies of the balls filled with caoutchouc (natural rubber) used in the indigenous game ōllamalīztli with the "air-filled" balls used on the Iberian Peninsula.

In an important testimony, Joan Lluís Vives (1493–1540) wrote a comparison between the jeu de paume (lit. 'played with the palm'), a game played with hard balls and gut-string rackets, and the Spanish ball game similar to pilota valenciana and played with "balls of wind" struck with the palm of the hand. He also compared the use of gut strings for the racquets with their use for guitar strings, due to their inherent strength and elasticity.

Another variant, known as baloun, is similar to modern volleyball. Visiting Livorno in 1677, Dutch travelling artist Cornelis de Bruijn wrote:

The balloon game is very popular here during the Shrovetide season. It consists of two teams, each of which tries to become the master of the ball, striking it over the other team. The area used as a field is enclosed with a rope all around, and the game is entertaining to watch.

According to a book of 1840, Barcelona had a place for playing a joc de pilota (lit. 'ball game'), but it is not clear what kind of game or games were played. The eventual arrival and discovery of rubber and synthetic polymers allowed an improvement in the performance of the balls used in many games and sports.

== Scaino Antonio and his work on the ball game ==
At the request of Alfonso d'Este, Antonio da Salò Scaino (priest, theologian and writer) documented the ball game. With reference balls of wind, he described in detail how the bladder and the small tube and a kind of Check valve (or retention) based packing, allowing the bellows to properly inflate the ball in a similar way of the one being used today. He also mentioned the habit of adding some wine inside the chamber so the balls could keep its characteristics (its flexibility) over the time. The system of "Check valve" employed in the balls of wind made of bladder, was described by Juan Valverde de Amusco and "Fray Luis de Granada."

== Construction ==
The usual ball of wind was the bladder of an animal. Its outer surface was coated with leather and, once covered, the bladder was filled with air under pressure, using a dedicated type of bellows to inflate it.

== See also ==
- Palazzo della Pilotta
- Ball game
- Ball
- Augurio Perera
- Balloon
