= Balloon (game) =

Ancient sport

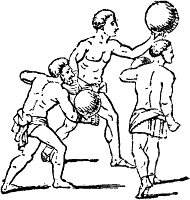
Ball game in progress

Balloon, baloun, balloon-ball or wind-ball is a game similar to the modern game of volleyball, in which a leather ball is batted by the fist or forearm to prevent it from touching the ground. The game was played in ancient Rome where it was known as follis, the Latin word for a leather bag. Such a ball made of leather was quite heavy and so protection might be used such as a leather gauntlet or wooden bracer. The Roman game was considered a sport for boys and old men, as Martial wrote:

Ite procul juvenes; mitis mihi convenit ætas
Folle decet pueros ludere, folle senes.

Translation:

Go away, young men. A gentle age suits me.
The balloon is for boys to play with, likewise old men.

Once rubber became available, modern players in Great Britain played the game with lighter balls of inflated rubber, allowing younger children to join in.

== See also ==
- Episkyros - ancient Greek ball game
- Handball - team sport with two teams of seven players each
- Harpastum - ball game played in the Roman Empire
- Pallone - several traditional Italian ball games
