= Episkyros =

Ancient Greek ball game

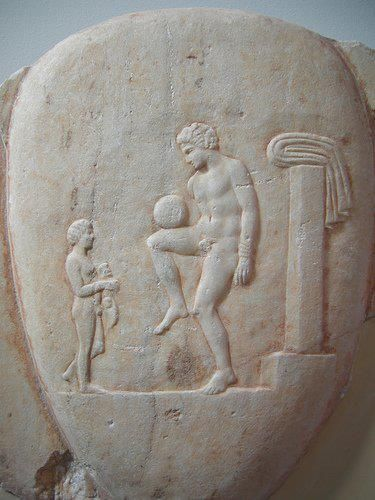
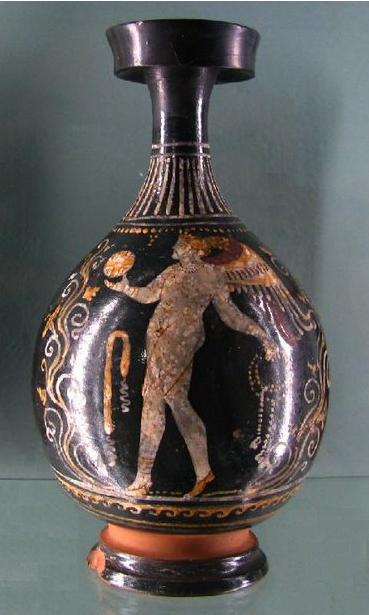
Left: Ancient Greek youth practicing with a ball depicted in low relief. Now displayed at the National Archaeological Museum, Athens. Right: a bottle (Lekythos) in gnathia style depicting a figure – Eros – playing with a ball, third quarter of the 4th century BCE.

Episkyros, or episcyrus (Ancient Greek: ἐπίσκυρος, epískyros, lit. 'upon the skyros'; also ἐπίκοινος, epíkoinos, lit. 'upon the public') was an Ancient Greek ball game. The game was typically played between two teams of 12 to 14 players each, being highly teamwork-oriented. The game allowed full contact and usage of the hands. While it was typically men who played, women also occasionally participated.

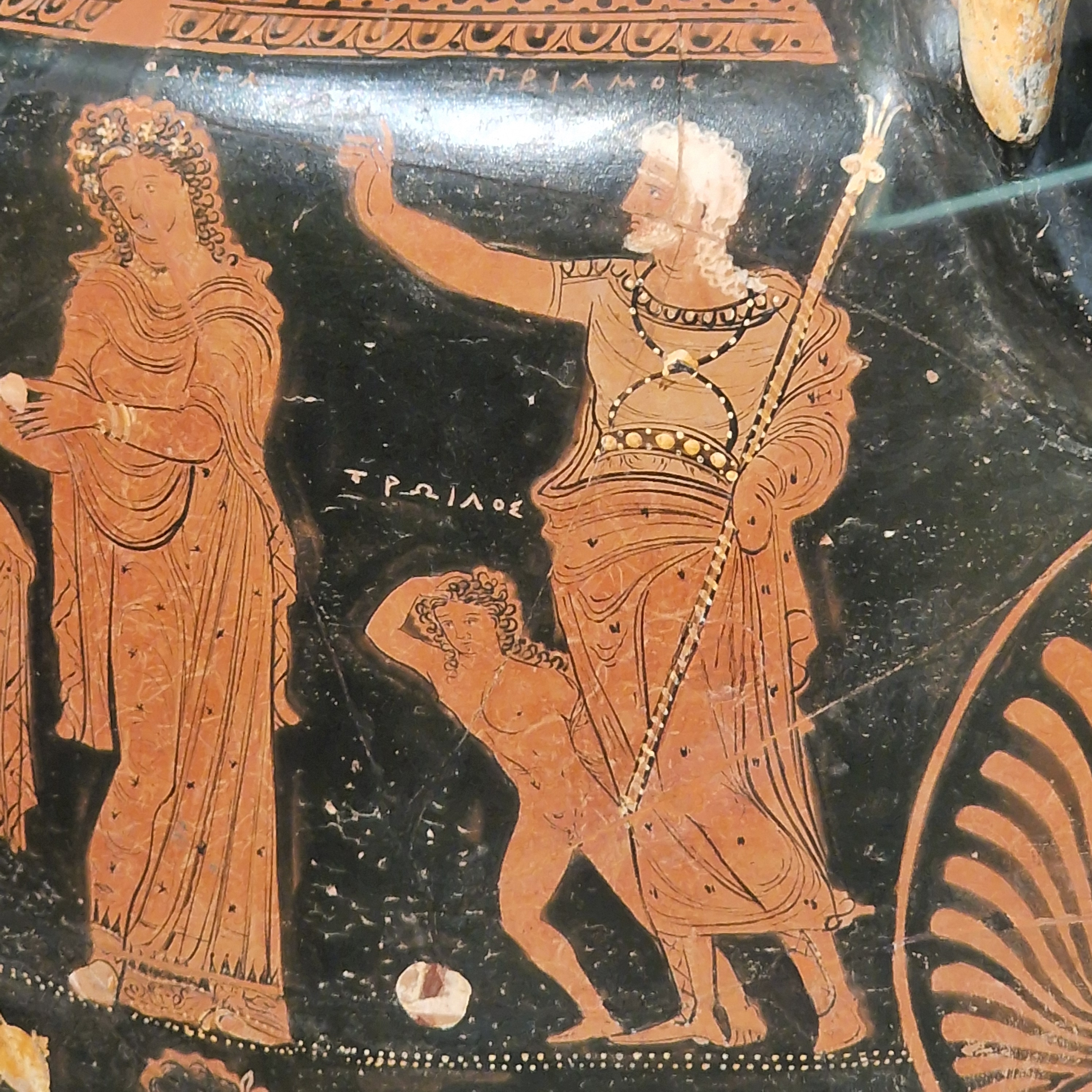
Young Troilus playing with a ball next to king Priam. Volute Krater, around 340 BC, Musée d'Art et d'Histoire (Geneva).

Although it was a ball game, it was quite violent (at least in Sparta). The game is comparable to rugby, American football, or calcio storico fiorentino, at least in concept. The two teams would attempt to throw the ball over the heads of the other team. There was a white line called the skŷros (σκῦρος) between the teams, and another white line behind each team. The teams would change possession of the ball often, until one of the teams was forced behind their line. In Sparta, a form of episkyros was played during an annual city festival that included five teams of 14 players. The Greek game of episkyros, or a similar game called phainínda (Φαινίνδα) (Note: The name φαινίνδα probably means something like "deceiving game" from the verb φενακίζω, phenakizo, "(I) cheat", "(I) lie") was later adopted by the Romans, who renamed and transformed it into harpastum. "Harpastum" is the latinisation of the Ancient Greek ἁρπαστόν (harpastón), meaning "snatched away" from the verb ἁρπάζω (harpázō), meaning "to seize" or "to filch".

A depiction on a vase displayed at the National Archaeological Museum, Athens, shows a Greek athlete balancing a ball on his thigh. This image was reproduced on the European Championship football trophy from 1960 to 2004. Other ancient Greek sports with a ball besides episkyros were: ἀπόῤῥαξις (apórrhaxis, "dribbling"), οὐρανία (ūranía, "sky ball") and maybe σφαιρομαχία (sphairomakhía, lit. ''ball-fight'') from σφαῖρα (sphaîra, "ball", whence "sphere") and μάχη (mákhē, "battle"), though it has been argued that the sphairomakhia in this context is rather a boxing competition, and the sphairai were a form of boxing gloves. Julius Pollux includes phaininda and harpastum in a list of ball games:

Phaininda takes its name from Phaenides, who first invented it, or from phenakizein ("to deceive"), because they show the ball to one man and then throw to another, contrary to expectation. It is likely that this is the same as the game with the small ball, which takes its name from harpazein ("to snatch") and perhaps one would call the game with the soft ball by the same name.

== See also ==
- Harpastum
- Trigon
- History of football
- American football
- History of physical training and fitness
