= Penny floater =

Cheap football commonly used by children

A penny floater or fly away is a kind of cheap football commonly used by children in the Western world. Its name derives from the fact that when they were first developed in the 1960s they cost a penny. The penny floater may have originated in Italy. The floater part comes from the fact that as they are made of a thin layer of hardened plastic filled with air: their light weight makes them susceptible to floating or swerving with the wind.

Penny floaters are commonly used by young children; however, among older children they are an object of ridicule and mocked as cheap toy footballs unsuitable for use. Nonetheless, their cheapness and the fact that they do not damage other objects in urban environments as easily as regular footballs do make them common. Professional footballs are sometimes compared to penny floaters disparagingly, as in the case of the Adidas Jabulani football used in the 2010 FIFA World Cup. The Jabulani was criticised for its performance, which was partly because its internal stitching made it too spherical to spin normally and more like a penny floater in that regard.
