= Calcio storico fiorentino =

Early form of football still played in Florence, Italy

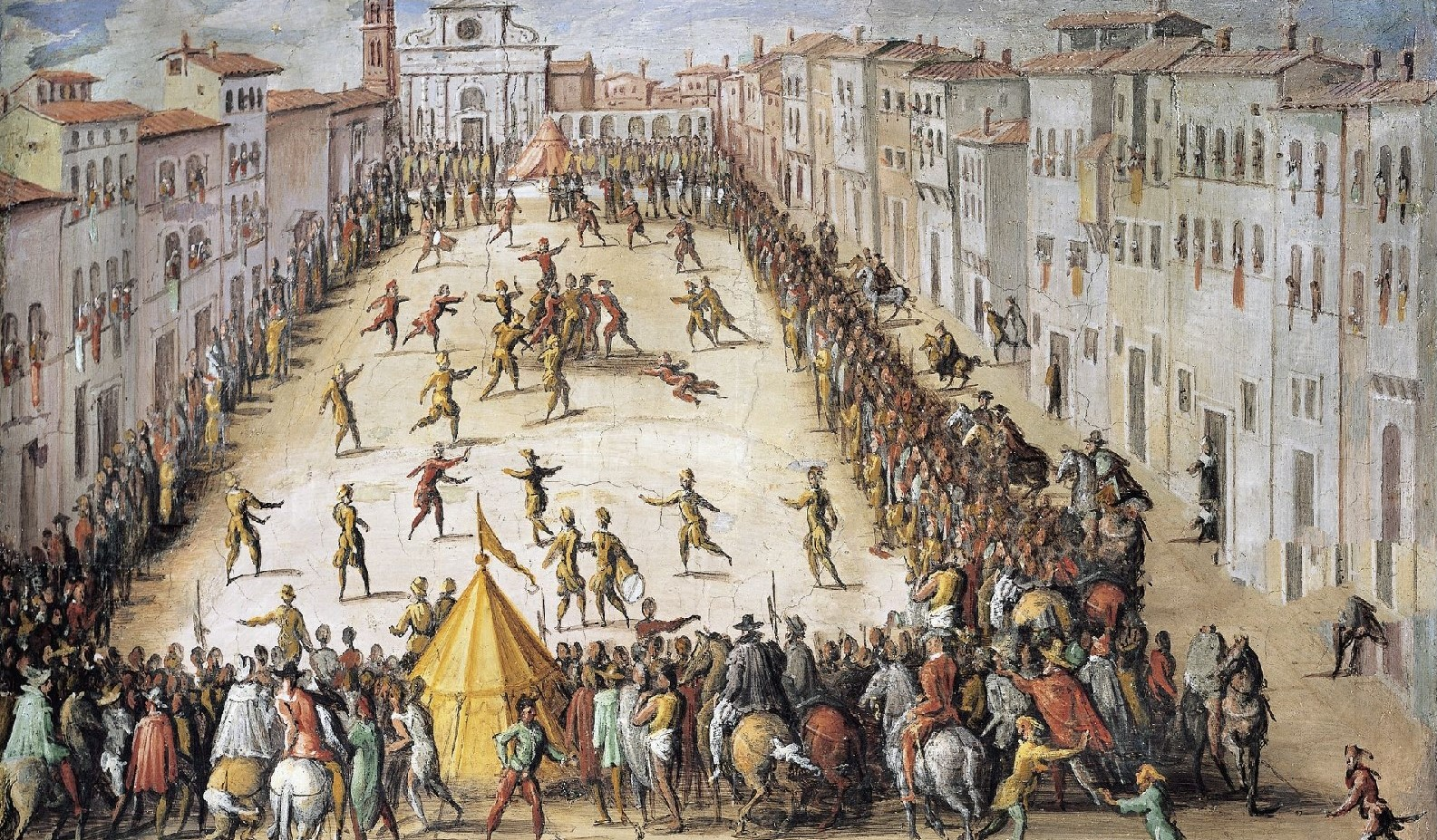
Calcio match in Piazza Santa Maria Novella, in Florence, Italy. Painting by Jan Van der Straet.

Calcio storico fiorentino, also known as calcio storico or calcio in livrea, is an early form of football that originated during the Middle Ages in Italy and is still played in Florence. Once widely played, the sport is thought to have started in the Piazza Santa Croce in Florence. There it became known as the giuoco del calcio fiorentino or simply calcio, which is now also the name for association football in the Italian language. The game may have started as a revival of the Roman sport of harpastum.

It is organised during the celebrations of St. John the Baptist, with the final held annually on 24 June, the saint's feast day.

== History ==
=== Renaissance era ===
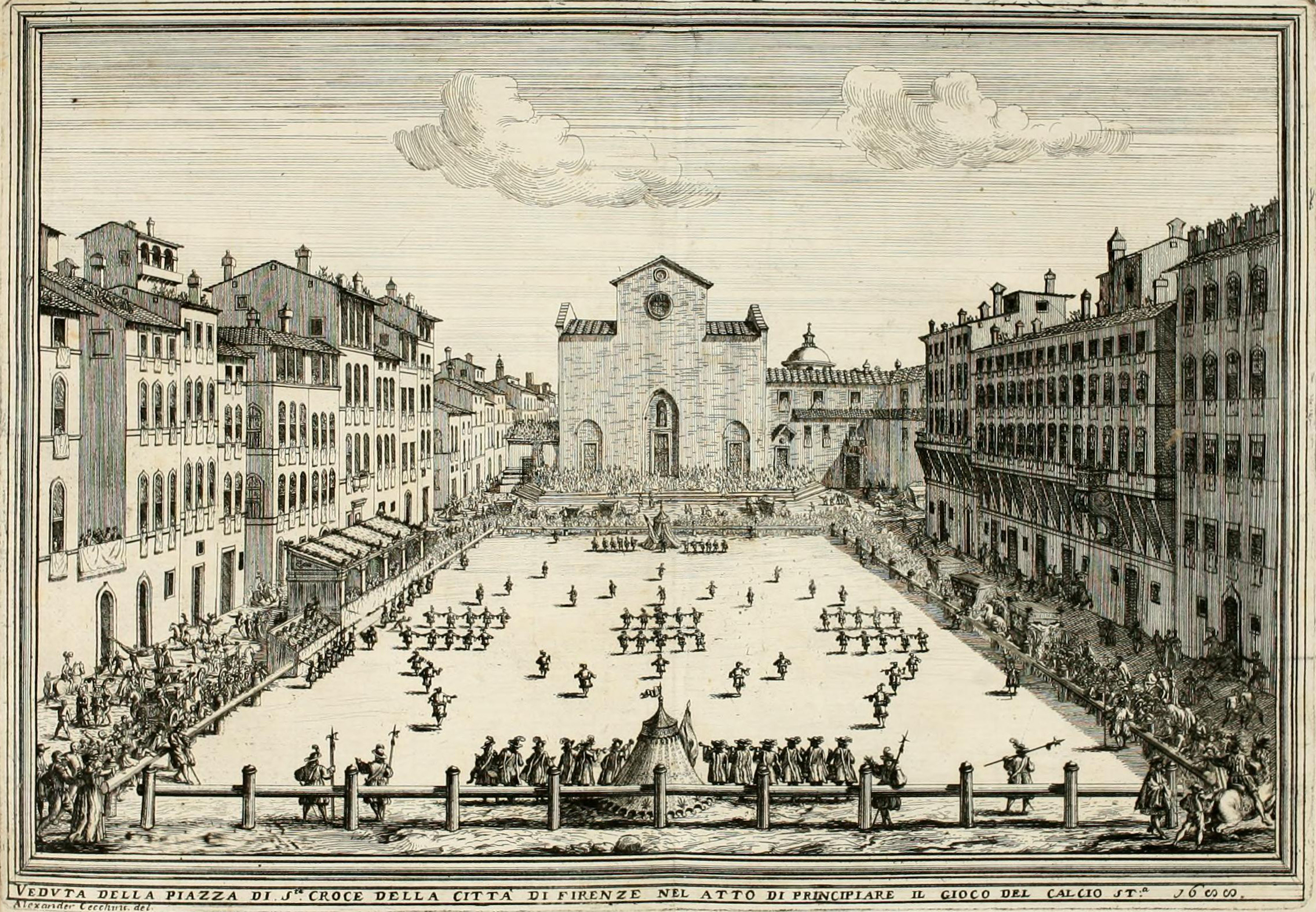
A calcio storico fiorentino game played at Piazza Santa Croce, Florence, Italy

According to the legend, playing violent games was a way to train young soldiers, and calcio was born out of this rugby-like military training when the aristocrats turned it into a fully-fledged sport.

On a famous occasion, the city of Florence held a match on 17 February 1530, in defiance of the imperial troops sent by Emperor Charles V, as the city was under siege. The "noble game" was played in Piazza Santa Croce, only by distinguished soldiers, lords, noblemen and princes.

A version of the rules for the game was first recorded by Giovanni de' Bardi in the late 16th century.

=== Modern revival ===
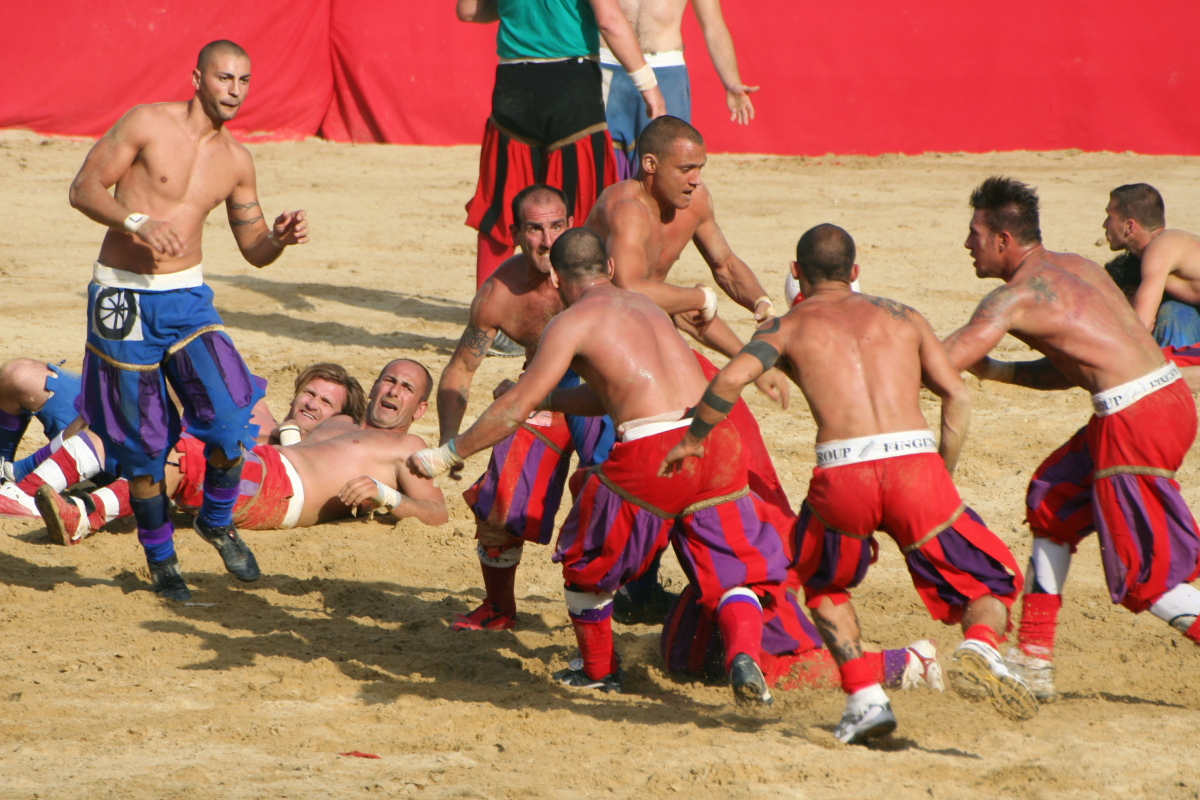
Match Between Azzurri and Rossi in 2008

Interest in calcio waned in the early 17th century. However, in 1930 it was reorganised as a game in the Kingdom of Italy, under Benito Mussolini. It was widely played by amateurs in streets and squares using handmade balls of cloth or animal skin. Today, three matches are played each year in Piazza Santa Croce, in Florence, in the third week of June. A team from each quartiere of the city is represented:

- Santa Croce / Azzurri (Blues)
- Santa Maria Novella / Rossi (Reds)
- Santo Spirito / Bianchi (Whites)
- San Giovanni / Verdi (Greens)

After playing each other in two opening semi-final games, the two winners go into the final, held annually on 24 June, the feast of Saint John the Baptist, the patron saint of Florence. For decades, this violent match has resulted in severe injuries, including death. During the early decades, bulls were sometimes ushered into the ring to add confusion and help produce a winner, in order to encourage wagering. The modern version of calcio has not changed much from its historical roots, which allow tactics such as head-butting, punching, elbowing, and choking. However, due to often fatal injuries, sucker punches and kicks to the head are currently banned. It is also prohibited for more than one player to attack an opponent. Any violation leads to being expelled from the game.

The most successful team since 1979 is Santa Croce / Azzurri (Blues) with over 20 tournament wins. Tournaments have been cancelled on several occasions due to violence or foul play. These incidents have led to major rule changes, such as ensuring players are born in Florence (or have been resident for at least ten years) and excluding players that have criminal convictions.

Winners by year
Year	Winner
2026	Santa Croce / Azzurri (Blues)
2025	Santa Maria Novella / Rossi (Reds)
2024	Santa Maria Novella / Rossi (Reds)
2023	Santa Maria Novella / Rossi (Reds)
2022	Santa Croce / Azzurri (Blues)
2021	Santa Croce / Azzurri (Blues)
2020	No tournament
2019	Santa Maria Novella / Rossi (Reds)
2018	Santa Maria Novella / Rossi (Reds)
2017	Santo Spirito / Bianchi (Whites)
2016	Santo Spirito / Bianchi (Whites)
2015	Santo Spirito / Bianchi (Whites)
2014	Cancelled after foul play in semifinal
2013	Santa Croce / Azzurri (Blues)
2012	Santa Croce / Bianchi (Whites)
2011	Santa Croce / Azzurri (Blues)
2010	Multiple team forfeitures
2009	No winner declared
2008	Santa Maria Novella / Rossi (Reds)
2007	Suspended due to crowd security concerns
2006	Tournament cancelled: uncontrolled brawl
2005	Santa Croce / Azzurri (Blues)
2004	Santa Maria Novella / Rossi (Reds)
2003	Santa Croce / Azzurri (Blues)
2002	Santa Croce / Azzurri (Blues)
2001	No winner declared
2000	No winner declared
1999	Santa Croce / Azzurri (Blues)
1998	Santa Maria Novella / Rossi (Reds)
1997	No winner declared
1996	San Giovanni / Verdi (Greens)
1995	Santa Croce / Azzurri (Blues)
1994	Santa Croce / Azzurri (Blues)
1993	Santa Croce / Azzurri (Blues)
1992	Santa Croce / Azzurri (Blues)
1991	Santa Croce / Azzurri (Blues)
1990	No winner declared
1989	Santa Croce / Azzurri (Blues)
1988	Santa Croce / Azzurri (Blues)
1987	Tournament suspended: safety concerns
1986	Santa Croce / Azzurri (Blues)
1985	Santa Croce / Azzurri (Blues)
1984	Santa Croce / Azzurri (Blues)
1983	Santa Croce / Azzurri (Blues)
1982	Tournament cancelled: uncontrolled brawl
1981	Santo Spirito / Bianchi (Whites)
1980	Santa Croce / Azzurri (Blues)
1979	Santa Croce / Azzurri (Blues)

== Rules ==
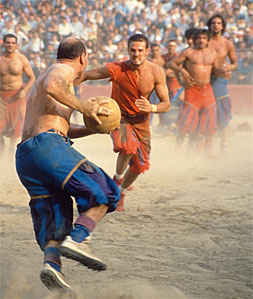
Calcio storico fiorentino match in Florence, Italy.

Matches last 50 minutes and are played on a field covered in sand, twice as long as it is wide (approximately 100 m × 50 m or 109 by 55 yards). A white line divides the field into two identical squares, and a goal net runs the width of each end.

Each team has 27 players and no substitutions are allowed for injured or expelled players. The teams are made up of four datori indietro (goalkeepers), three datori innanzi (fullbacks), five sconciatori (halfbacks) and 15 innanzi or corridori (forwards). The captain and standard bearer's tent sits at the center of the goal net. They do not actively participate in the game, but can organise their teams and occasionally act as referees, mainly to calm down their players or to stop fights.

The referee proper and the six linesmen officiate the match in collaboration with the judge commissioner, who remains off the field. The referee, above everyone else, is the master of the field, and is responsible for making sure the game runs smoothly, stepping into the field only to maintain discipline and reestablish order when fights occur.

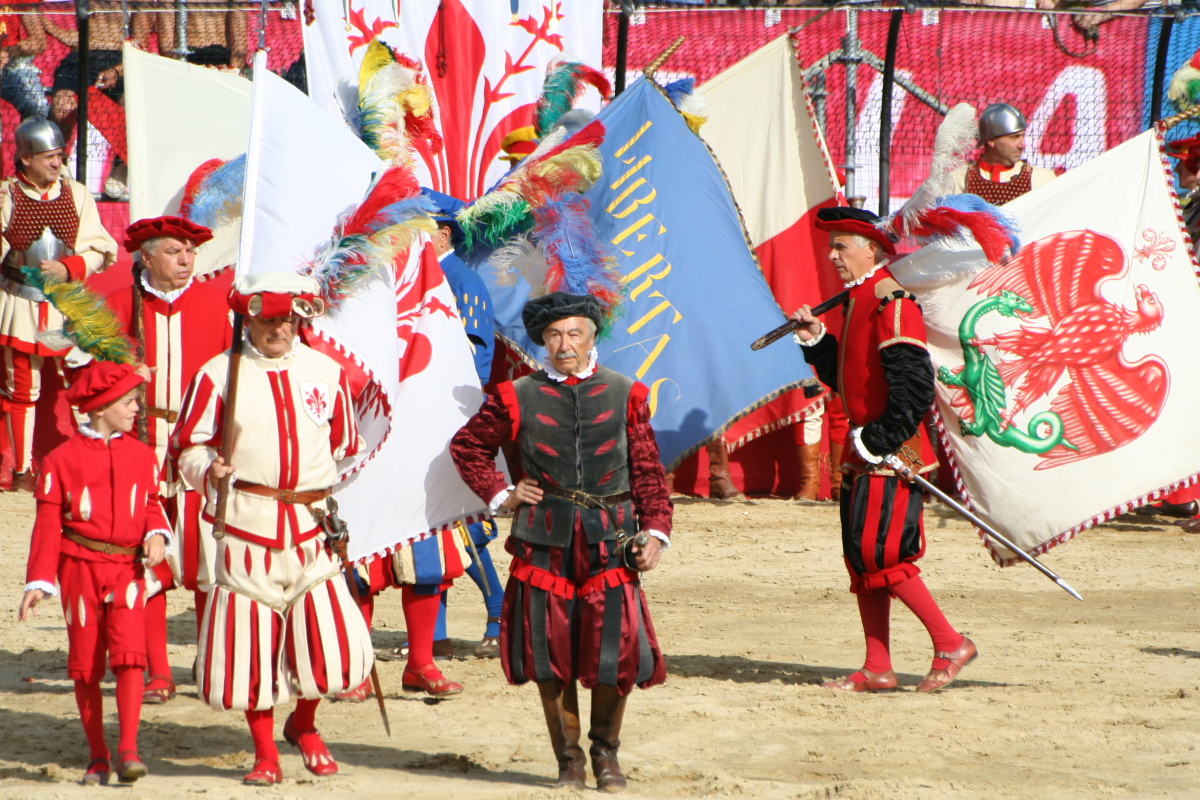
Calcio Storico Parade in 2008

Shots from a small cannon or culverin announces the beginning of the event and each caccia, or goal. The game starts when the pallaio (the ceremonial ball-carrier) throws the ball toward the center line. The fifteen forwards or corridori from each team begin fighting in a wild mixed martial arts match—punching, kicking, tripping, hacking, tackling, and wrestling with each other in an effort designed to tire opponents' defenses, but which often descends into an all-out brawl. They try to pin and force into submission as many players possible. Once there are enough incapacitated players, the other teammates come and swoop up the ball and head to the goal.

From this moment on, the players try by any means necessary to get the ball into the opponents' goal, also called caccia. The teams change sides with every caccia, or goal, scored. It is important to shoot with precision, because every time a player throws or kicks the ball above the net, the opposing team is awarded with a half caccia. The game ends after 50 minutes and the team which scored the most cacce wins.

Along with the pallio, the winning team used to receive a Chianina, a type of pure-bred cow. However, this has been reduced to a free dinner for the winning team; the players earn no other compensation.

== In popular culture ==
Italian Baroque poet Gabriello Chiabrera wrote three odes about Florentine football, emphasising the game's spectacular aspects and comparing it with Roman gladiatorial games. The comic book series Bitch Planet includes an event titled "Duemila" or "Megaton"; in issue #4 the event is described: "Megaton is one of many modern descendants of calcio fiorentino, a 16th century Italian sport... Teams may have any number of players, but their combined weight can be no more than 2,000 lb [910 kg]!"

In the 2017 film Lost In Florence, Brett Dalton plays a former college football star who travels to Italy and becomes involved in playing calcio storico fiorentino.

In episode 4, "Judgement Day" of the TV series, Medici: Masters of Florence, the main characters engage in a game of calcio storico fiorentino in the main square of Florence during a flashback sequence.

In the sixth episode from the second season of Syfy Channel's HAPPY! (titled "Pervapalooza"), the demon Orcus references calcio storico fiorentino while trapped inside Blue Scaramucci's body. The demon says that hockey seems like foxy boxing compared to calcio storico fiorentino.

The Mirror & the Light, Hilary Mantel's novel about Thomas Cromwell, contains a description of an early 16th-century game of calcio storico fiorentino, emphasising its brutality.

Episode 1 of the 2020 Netflix series Home Game is dedicated to calcio storico fiorentino, featuring behind-the-scenes player vignettes contemporary to the 2019 Reds-versus-Whites final match. In addition to providing historical information, the episode depicts interviews with players from both teams.

== See also ==
- Serie A
- Football in Italy
- Rugby union in Italy
