= Harpastum =

Ball game played in the Roman Empire

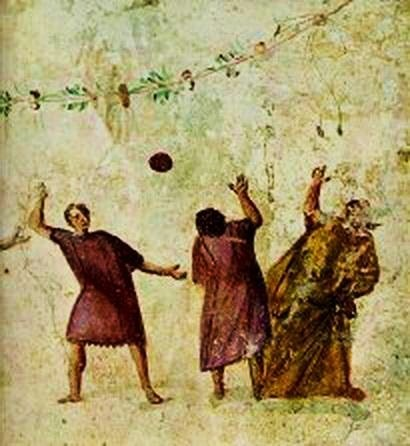
Harpastum, ancient Roman fresco

Harpastum, also known as harpustum, was a form of ball game played in the Roman Empire. The Romans also referred to it as the small ball game. The ball used was small (not as large as a follis, paganica, or football-sized ball) and hard, probably about the size and solidity of a softball, and was stuffed with feathers. The word harpastum is the latinisation of the Greek ἁρπαστόν (harpaston), the neuter of ἁρπαστός (harpastos), 'carried away', from the verb ἁρπάζω (harpazo), 'to seize, to snatch'.

This game was apparently a Romanized version of a Greek game called phaininda (Greek: φαινίνδα), or of another Greek game called episkyros (Greek: ἐπίσκυρος). It involved considerable speed, agility and physical exertion. The two teams needed to keep the ball on their side of the field as long as they could.

Little is known about the exact rules of the game, but sources indicate the game was a violent one with players often ending up on the ground. In Greece, a spectator (of the Greek form of the game) once had his leg broken when he got caught in the middle of play.

In the Middle Ages, the game is thought to have inspired an Italian revival played in Florence known as calcio storico fiorentino, which is played to this day.

== Writings related to harpastum ==
Athenaeus writes:

Harpastum, which used to be called phaininda, is the game I like most of all. Great are the exertion and fatigue attendant upon contests of ball-playing, and violent twisting and turning of the neck. Hence Antiphanes, 'Damn it, what a pain in the neck I've got.' He describes the game thus: 'He seized the ball and passed it to a team-mate while dodging another and laughing. He pushed it out of the way of another. Another fellow player he raised to his feet. All the while the crowd resounded with shouts of Out of bounds, Too far, Right beside him, Over his head, On the ground, Up in the air, Too short, Pass it back in the scrum.'

Galen, in "On Exercise with the Small Ball", describes harpastum as:

"better than wrestling or running because it exercises every part of the body, takes up little time, and costs nothing"; it was "profitable training in strategy", and could be "played with varying degrees of strenuousness". Galen adds, "When, for example, people face each other, vigorously attempting to prevent each other from taking the space between, this exercise is a very heavy, vigorous one, involving much use of the hold by the neck, and many wrestling holds."

An anonymous poet praises the ball skills of Piso:

No less is your nimbleness, if it is your pleasure to return the flying ball, or recover it when falling to the ground, and by a surprising movement get it within bounds again in its flight. To watch such play the populace remains stockstill, and the whole crowd suddenly abandons its own games.

Julius Pollux includes harpastum and phaininda in a list of ball games:

Phaininda takes its name from Phaenides, who first invented it, or from phenakizein ("to deceive"), because they show the ball to one man and then throw to another, contrary to expectation. It is likely that this is the same as the game with the small ball, which takes its name from harpazein ("to snatch"); and perhaps one would call the game with the soft ball by the same name.

Sidonius Apollinaris describes a ball game in one of his letters:

And now the illustrious Filimatius sturdily flung himself into the squadrons of the players, like Virgil's hero, 'daring to set his hand to the task of youth'; he had been a splendid player himself in his youth. But over and over again, he was forced from his position among the stationary players by the shock of some runner from the middle, and driven into the midfield, where the ball flew past him, or was thrown over his head; and he failed to intercept or parry it. More than once he fell prone, and had to pick himself up from such collapses as best he could; naturally he was the first to withdraw from the stress of the game.

The general impression from these descriptions is of a game quite similar to rugby. Additional descriptions suggest a line was drawn in the dirt, and that the teams would endeavor to keep the ball behind their side of the line and prevent the opponents from reaching it. This seems rather like an "inverted" form of football. If the opponents had the ball on their side of the line, the objective would seem to be to get in and "pass" it to another player, or somehow get it back over the line. The ancient accounts of the game are not precise enough to enable the reconstruction of the rules in any detail.

In an epigram, Martial makes reference to the dusty game of harpasta in reference to Atticus's preference for running as exercise: "No hand-ball (pila), no bladder-ball (follis), no feather-stuffed ball (paganica) makes you ready for the warm bath, nor the blunted sword-stroke upon the unarmed stump; nor do you stretch forth squared arms besmeared with oil, nor, darting to and fro, snatch the dusty scrimmage-ball (harpasta), but you run only by the clear Virgin water (the Aqua Virgo aqueduct)."

== Monuments ==
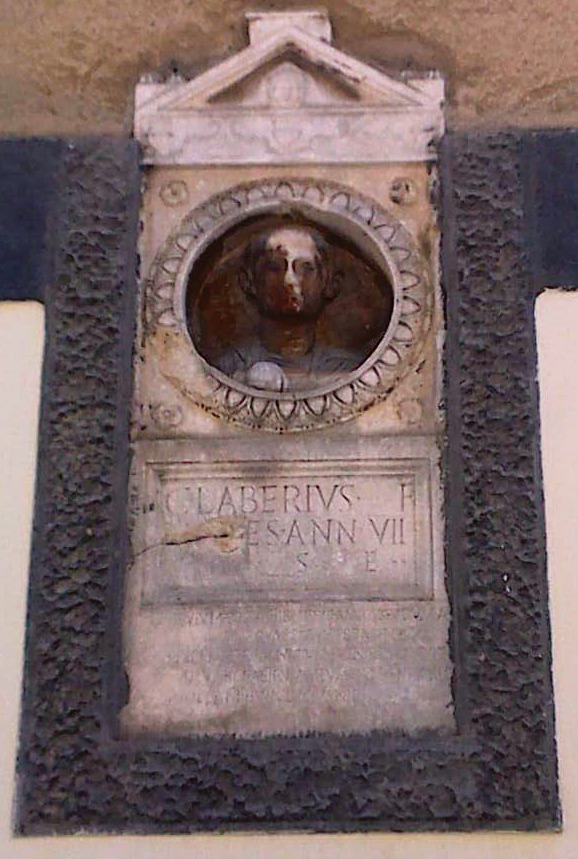
Tombstone of a boy with harpastum ball (Sinj, Dalmatia, Croatia)

In the Croatian town of Sinj, a Roman tombstone found in the ruins of the military camp Tilurium, near the modern day Trilj, shows a boy holding a harpastum ball in his hands. The ball that is shown on this monument has hexagonal and pentagonal patterns, similar to a modern-day association football.

== See also ==
- Calcio storico fiorentino
- Cuju
- Episkyros
- Follis (ball game)
- History of football (soccer)
- History of physical training and fitness
- Kirkwall Ba' Game
- La soule
- Trigon
- Volata

== Bibliography ==
- H. Harris, "Sport in Greece and Rome" (Thames & Hudson, 1972), pp. 86–99.
- William Smith (ed.), "Dictionary of Greek and Roman Antiquities", article on Pila.
