= Trigon (game) =

Ball game

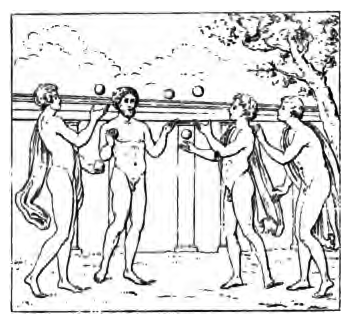
Depiction of a game of trigon (1885)

Trigon was a form of ball game played by the ancient Romans. The name derives from the Greek τρίγωνος (trigōnos, "three-cornered, triangular"), and may have been a romanized version of a Greek game called τρίγων (trigōn). It was a type of juggling game, probably involved three players standing in a triangle (hence the name) and passing a hard ball back and forth, catching with the left and throwing with the right hand. Besides the three players, called trigonali, there were also assistants called pilecripi, who kept score and retrieved runaway balls.

== Description in the Satyricon ==
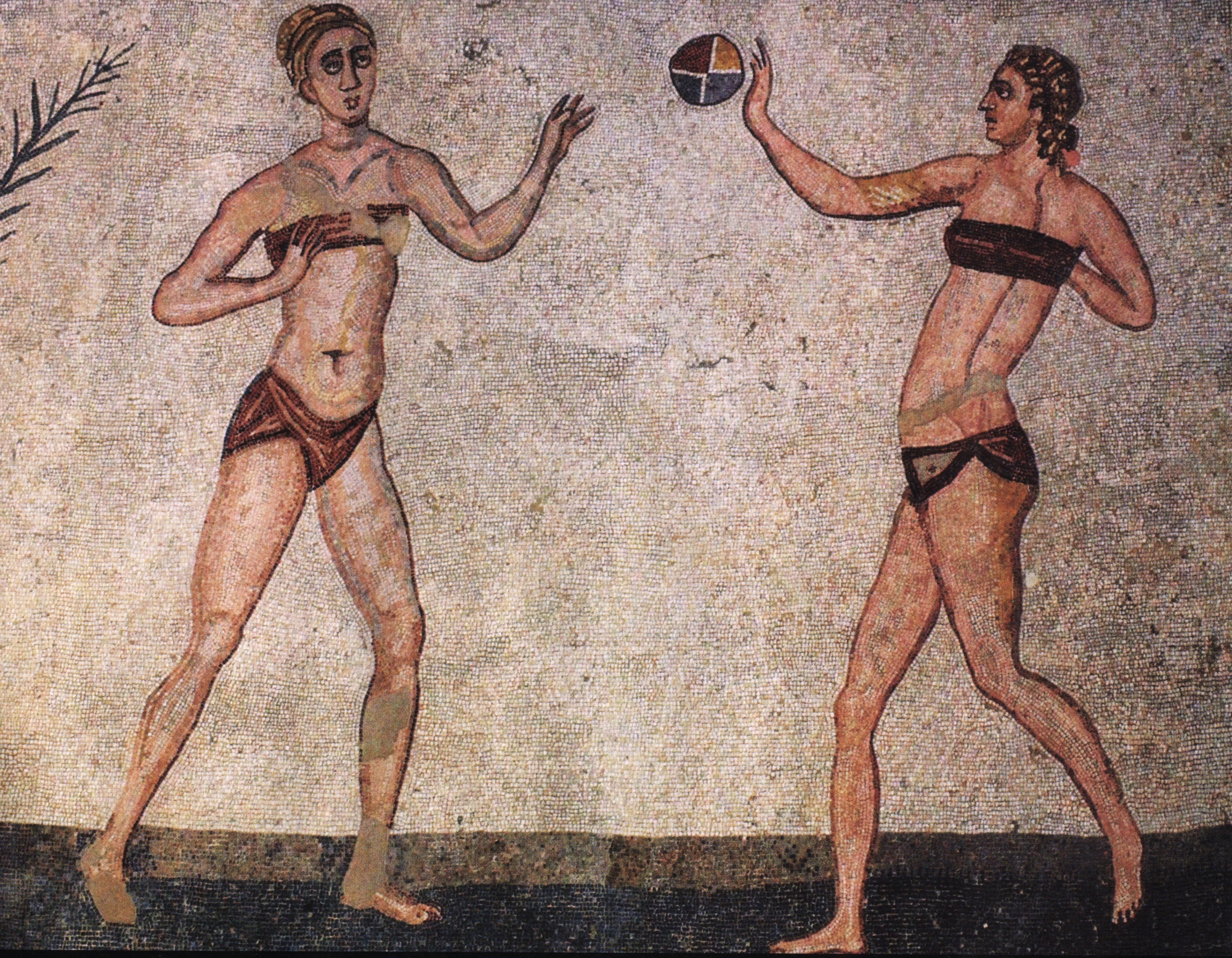
Mosaic from the Villa Romana del Casale showing two women playing with a ball (4th century AD)

Petronius's Satyricon has a description of a ball game usually assumed to be trigon, although its name is never mentioned. The bald old man Trimalchio is playing with a couple of young curly-haired slave boys. Trimalchio is obviously not a serious trigon player, because he plays in his sandals, and he never stoops to retrieve the ball, but instead has a servant replace it with a fresh ball from a big sack. When he snapped his fingers, a slave brought him water to wash his hands, and when he was finished he dried his hands with the long curly hair of the young slave boys.

Petronius also remarks that in this case, the pilecripus did not count the number of times the players successfully passed the ball, but instead the number of balls that dropped on the ground. This may be a joke making fun of Trimalchio's low level of skill, or simply an innovative scoring method.

== Rules ==
To play the sport, at least three participants would organize themselves in a triangle shape. Each player would hold a small and hard ball. The players would throw the balls at each other with their right hand and aim to catch the ones thrown at them with their left. Participants had around three to six balls. The point of the game was to keep the balls circling between the players continuously at high speeds. In one version of the game, if a player failed to catch the ball they would lose a point. Whoever had the least points at the end of the game lost. In another version of the game, if the ball fell the game was over and whoever failed to catch it was considered the loser. Players who could use their left-hand to catch balls were considered to be admirable due to the skill involved. Scorekeepers would be used to keep track of the points and retrieve stray balls.

== See also ==
- Harpastum
- History of physical training and fitness
