= Montgérain =

- Commune
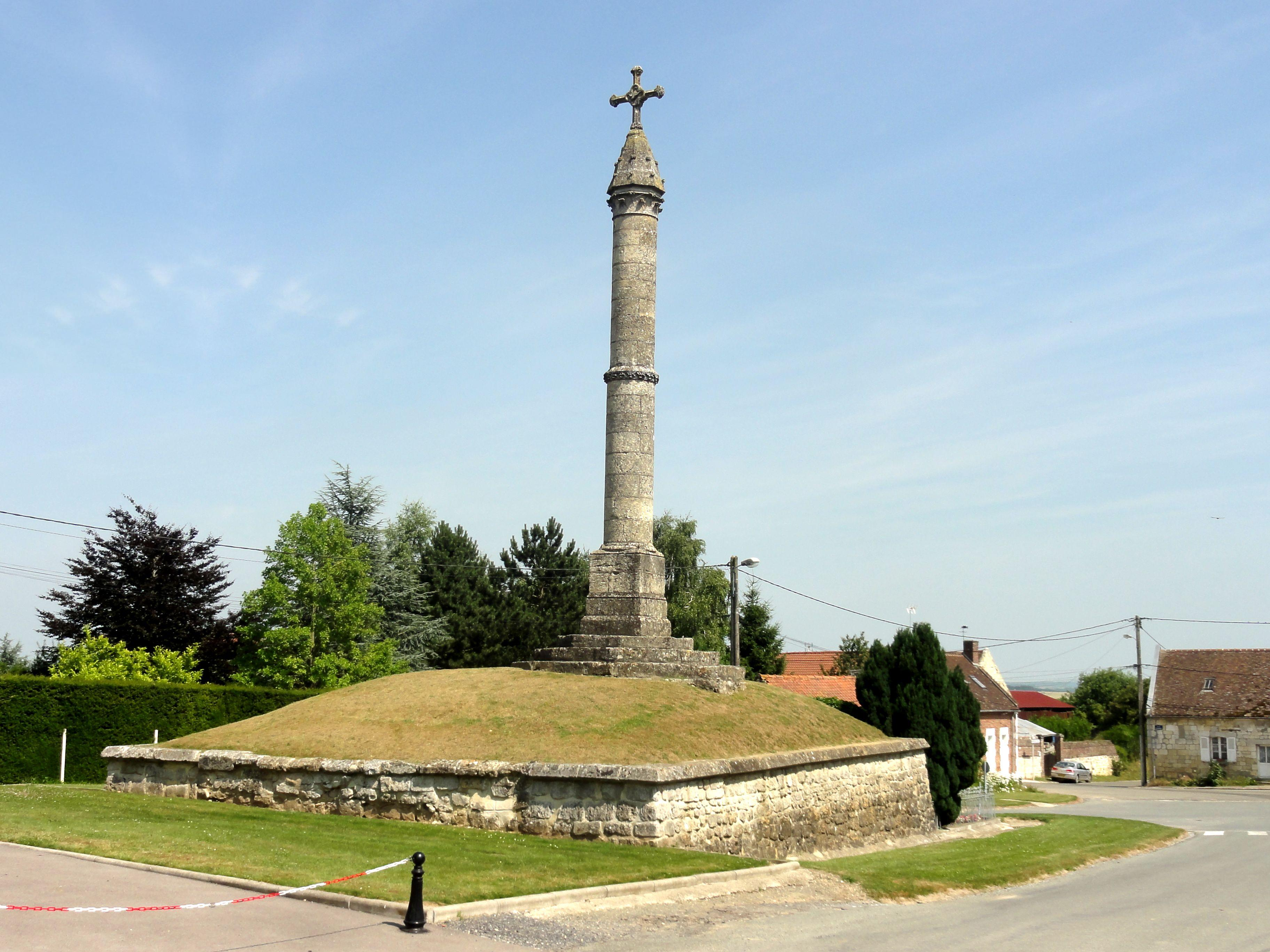
- The calvary in Montgérain
- Location of Montgérain
- Location within France Location within Hauts-de-France
- Coordinates: 49°32′15″N 2°34′33″E
- Country: France
- Region: Hauts-de-France
- Department: Oise
- Arrondissement: Clermont
- Canton: Estrées-Saint-Denis
- Intercommunality: Plateau Picard

Government
  - Mayor (2020–2026): Philippe Warmé
- Area^{1}: 4.91 km^{2} (1.90 sq mi)
- Elevation: 107 m (351 ft)
- Highest elevation: 134 m (440 ft)
- Lowest elevation: 100 m (330 ft)
- Population (2023): 166
  - Density: 33.8/km^{2} (87.6/sq mi)
- Time zone: UTC+01:00 (CET)
  - Summer (DST): UTC+02:00 (CEST)
- INSEE/Postal code: 60416 /60420
- ^{1} French Land Register data, which excludes lakes, ponds, glaciers > 1 km^{2} (0.386 sq mi or 247 acres) and river estuaries.

Montgérain (French pronunciation: [mɔ̃ʒeʁɛ̃]) is a commune in the Oise department in northern France.

Montgérain is located 40 km northeast of Beauvais and 23 km northwest of Compiègne. Its nearest neighbors are Saint-Martin-aux-Bois, Coivrel, and Ménévillers. Other neighboring communities are Tricot to the north, Maignelay-Montigny to the northwest, and Wacquemoulin to the south.

== See also ==
- Communes of the Oise department
