= Abbey of Saint-Martin-aux-Bois =

Historic abbey in Oise, France

- West front of the church and the ruins

- Location within France Location within Hauts-de-France

Monastery information
- Order: Augustinian Canons
- Established: c.1080
- Disestablished: 1790
- Dedication: Martin of Tours
- Diocese: Beauvais

Architecture
- Heritage designation: Classified monument historique (1840)
- Style: Gothic

Site
- Location: Saint-Martin-aux-Bois, Oise, France
- Coordinates: 49°31′22″N 2°34′15″E
- Website: www.abbaye-saint-martin-aux-bois.fr

The Abbey of Saint-Martin-aux-Bois is a former Augustinian abbey in the village of Saint-Martin-aux-Bois in the Oise department of northern France. It was founded around 1080 by a community of canons and passed through various hands until its closure during the French Revolution. While most buildings have disappeared, substantial parts of the complex still remain, including the unfinished church and the old refectory. A remarkable example of mid-13th-century Gothic architecture, the church was one of the first monuments historiques to be classified in France. Today, it continues to be used by the local community and opens to the public on certain days during summer.

== History ==
=== Origins ===
Saint-Martin-aux-Bois ('Saint Martin in the woods') was originally called Ruricourt (or Rurecourt), a name that would continue to be used until the end of the 13th century. The abbey dedicated to Martin of Tours was begun there in the late 11th century, though the precise details of its foundation remain uncertain: according to the Gallia Christiana, the first canons arrived at Ruricourt from the former Abbey of Saint-Quentin near Beauvais; however, recent research suggests that the first canons may in fact have been a group of men who founded their own independent monastery following the Rule of Saint Augustine. The abbey's first recorded abbot was Hernand de Coivrel, elected in 1080.

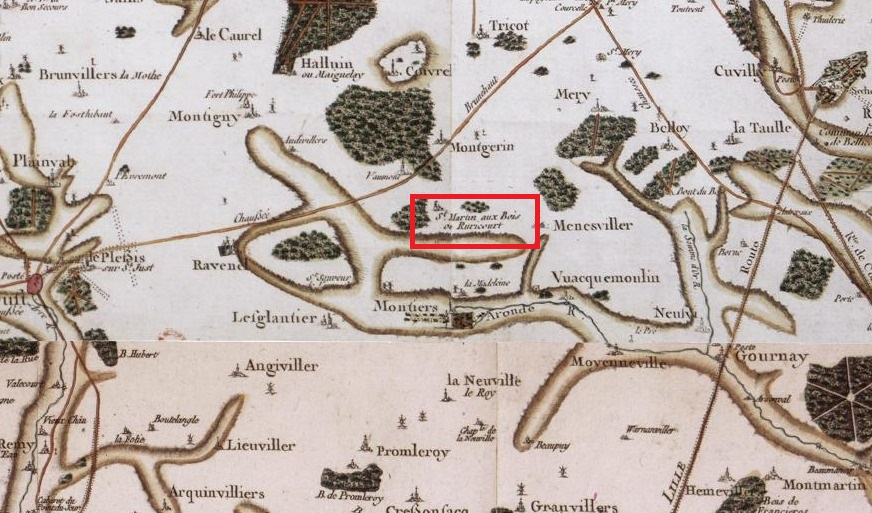
St. Martin aux Bois ou Ruricourt on Cassini's map (18th century)

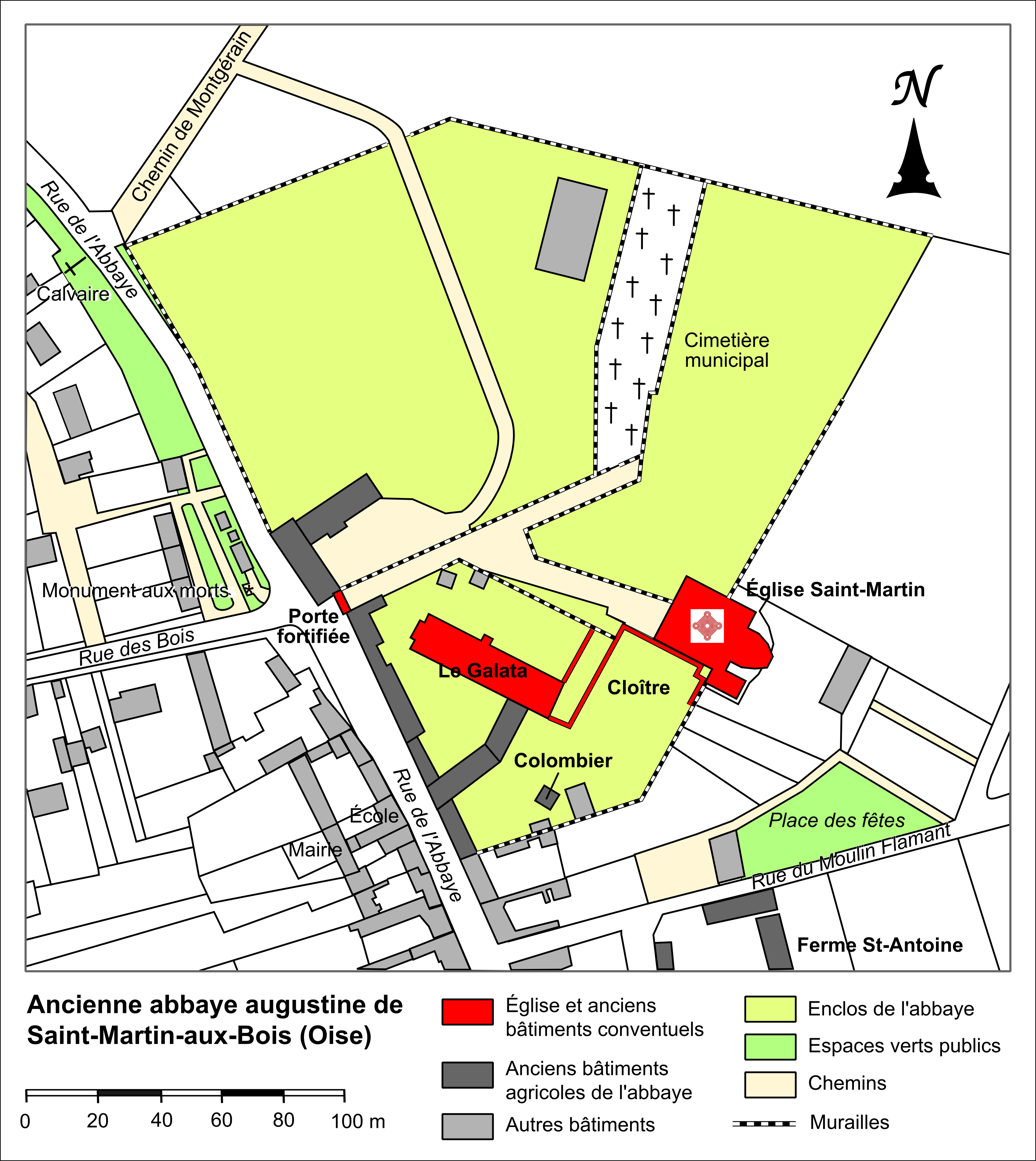
Plan of the abbey complex (only surviving buildings shown)

=== Middle Ages ===
From its foundation the abbey received substantial donations from local lords, such as those in neighbouring Léglantiers. Further endowments followed in the 12th and 13th centuries from lay lords, the Crown and the Bishop of Meaux, including the priories of Saint-Jean de Dammartin and Betz and the village of Wacquemoulin, so that by the mid-13th century the abbey held lands, churches and tithes throughout the surrounding area. It also exercised high, middle and low justice in Belloy, Buzorlon and Ménévillers, a right it retained until the Revolution. These revenues allowed the relatively modest community of canons to construct their architecturally impressive abbey church.

The new church was completed in the ambitious Rayonnant style in 1260, after which the abbey led a relatively peaceful existence for nearly two centuries. While most of its residents were canons regular, the abbey also admitted oblates and lay brothers, who were important for carrying out fieldwork and maintaining the estate. Because canons regular had the distinction of being part of the diocesan clergy, the abbot was also ex officio parish priest for the village. The village did not have a dedicated parish church, so its inhabitants were allowed access to the north aisle of the abbey where their masses were celebrated by one of the canons.

During the 14th century the Hundred Years' War did not appear to have much impact on the abbey; however its fortunes would shift in the following century. In 1445, the English set fire to the abbey, destroying most of the conventual buildings and damaging one of the church's towers, its west facade and some furnishings in the south aisle. They also looted the abbey's archives, a portion of which was eventually rediscovered in a fishmonger's house in Pontoise. Later, the canons, fearing reprisal, chose to side with the Burgundians during their occupation of the region, which led the King to punish the abbey by pillaging it. Following these misfortunes, the abbey may have been temporarily abandoned.

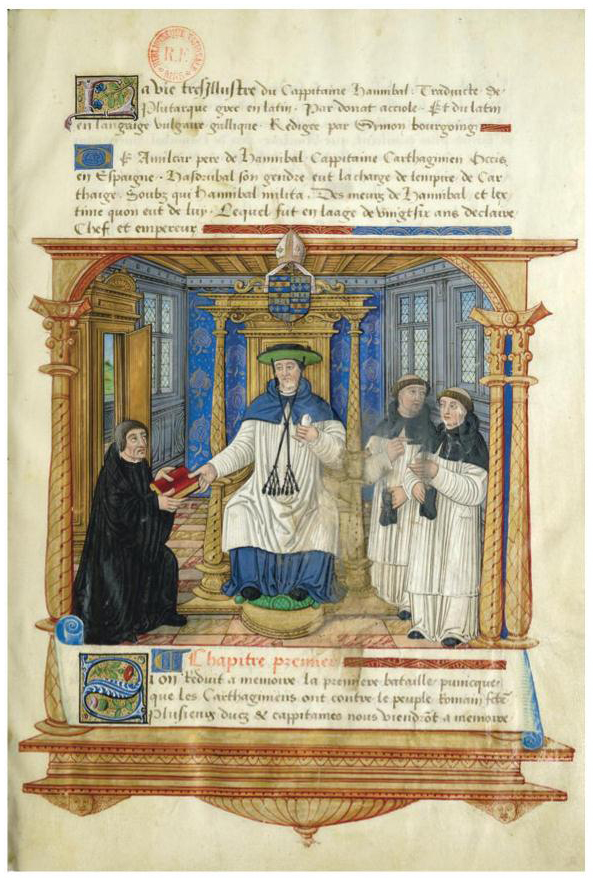
Guy de Baudreuil, first commendatory abbot of Saint-Martin-aux-Bois

The last regular abbot of Saint-Martin-aux-Bois was Guillaume de Baudreuil, appointed in 1474 by Pope Sixtus IV. He ceded the abbacy in 1492 to his brother Guy, a lawyer at the Parlement of Paris, whom Pope Alexander VI appointed as the first commendatory abbot. Even though he only held the property in commendam, Guy de Baudreuil took a particular interest in its affairs, leading it into a period of renewed prosperity and piety. He was responsible for reconstructing many of the claustral buildings following the destruction of the previous decades, and filled the church with rich furnishings. He also commissioned extensions to the church, such as the sacristy that was added in 1521.

=== Decline and dissolution ===
Under Guy's successor, François of Clèves, the abbey's affairs remained well-managed; but the commendatory abbots who came after him began to lose interest in the abbey. By 1547, Saint-Martin-aux-Bois had lost many of its holdings and could no longer produce the documents proving its rights; lands were being usurped, tithes remained unpaid, and the abbey was often unable to initiate legal proceedings in response.

By the early 17th century, ongoing economic difficulties had led many French monasteries to become lax in their observance of the Rule. Official visitation reports in 1607 noted that the abbey had fallen into a state of material and moral ruin. Following calls for monastic reform led by Charles Faure, in 1644 the abbey became affiliated to the canons regular of the Abbey of Saint Genevieve in Paris. Several of these Genovefan canons moved into Saint-Martin-aux-Bois to set a good example for the local canons. But it was already too late to resolve most of the abbey's financial difficulties. By 1662, it housed only ten members and the church was in a state of disrepair. Eventually, Pope Innocent XI united the abbey's estate with that of the Jesuit college of Clermont in 1675, rendering the title of Abbot of Saint-Martin-aux-Bois extinct and formally dividing the abbey in two: one part remained tied to the Genovefans, while the other was given to the Jesuits. The two groups seemed to coexist amicably over the following decades.

In 1762 the Jesuits, heavily indebted, were expelled from France. Not only did the dissolution of its Jesuit half put the abbey's future in jeopardy, but it was required to help contribute to the 300,000 livres demanded by the King to satisfy creditors. It was around this time that the abbey cut down Saint-Martin-aux-Bois' eponymous forest to raise funds, leaving the village exposed on the barren plateau as it still is today. By 1790 – during the Revolution – only six canons were left at the abbey and just thirteen others inhabited the few priories that still belonged to it. Most at the abbey dispersed within the year, leaving only the prior, who acted as the local priest, and one elderly lay brother. The confiscation and sale of its properties by the state began in 1791. However, the church escaped confiscation due to its continued role as the parish church.

West front in 1842, with the lost spire

=== 19th and 20th centuries ===
With the emergence of building restoration movements and new enthusiasm for the Gothic during the 19th century, the church's architectural significance began to be recognised. As early as 1833 it was included on an initial list of proposals for protection as a historical monument, and it was finally given official classification in 1840. Restoration to the areas most urgently needing repairs began in 1869 under the architect Aymar Verdier, and from 1873 Edmond Duthoit led the restoration of the apse. The west facade and its towers were later also repaired and reinforced. Between 1893 and 1907, various works were directed by the newly appointed architecte en chef des monuments historiques, H. Chaine, to restore the clerestory, nave vaults, roof and flying buttresses. Despite the 19th century's much-needed restorations, some parts of the church were still lost, such as the northern bell tower's timber spire, which collapsed in 1885.

During the First World War, the church was used as a lookout station and sheltered wounded soldiers. It escaped the Second World War without sustaining any damage.

In 1984, what remained of the conventual buildings and the surrounding structures belonging to the abbey of Saint-Martin-aux-Bois were also given protected monument status. These included the large building known as the Galata, the abbey's enclosure wall and gate, the remains of the cloister, and several smaller farm buildings.

=== Current day ===
The church continued to function as the parish church for the village of Saint-Martin-aux-Bois until the consolidation of the parish with its neighbours. Although regular masses have ceased, baptism and marriage ceremonies are occasionally still held there for members of the community. It is also a cultural site looked after by volunteers, including the association Stalles de Picardie. As of 2026, the church opens to visitors every Sunday afternoon in July and August, as well as on European Heritage Days.

== Architecture ==
South elevation of the church

West-east section (J. Durand)

Floor plan

=== Church ===
Built between 1245 and 1260, the abbey church is a masterpiece of Rayonnant Gothic architecture. The surviving structure consists of a choir flanked on either side by narrow aisles whose windows have been walled up, adorned instead with blind tracery. The central space of the church is therefore lit mainly from above by the high clerestory. These windows, each comprising a simple triple-lancet pattern crowned by a quatrefoil, nearly fill the entire upper wall area, fitting closely into the intrados of the nave's quadripartite rib vaults. At the east end is the magnificent seven-sided apse or chevet, its tall bays filled floor-to-ceiling almost entirely with glass, which is held in place by slender stone mullions surmounted by large trefoils. The lancets are interrupted roughly halfway up by a small transom, probably added for structural stability. It has been suggested that the masons (as yet unnamed) may have been connected to the construction of the Sainte-Chapelle in Paris (completed 1248), whose roughly contemporary apse bears a strong resemblance to the abbey's. Unlike the Sainte-Chapelle, most of the existing stained glass at Saint-Martin-aux-Bois is clear or lightly patterned grisaille (a kind of silver-grey monochromatic style), resulting in a much brighter interior.

Apart from its notable apse, several peculiarities distinguish the church of Saint-Martin-aux-Bois. Among these are the church's tall and narrow proportions: along its apex, the vault measures 27.25 metres high, while the whole space is only 18.45 metres wide and 31.10 metres long; and measured to the ridge of the roof, the building's total height is even greater than its interior length. Another curiosity is the contrast between the Rayonnant east end and the comparatively austere appearance of the triforium level that runs above the aisle arcades, consisting in every bay of only three simple quatrefoils set into an otherwise plain wall. But most noticeable of all is the complete absence of a nave, which would have extended the church further westwards if built. However, it was either destroyed or was never constructed due to a lack of funds. The church is only half-finished, abruptly truncated by a sheer, featureless wall standing in as a makeshift west front. A diminutive door in the bottom of the wall serves as the main entrance portal. Interestingly, this situation is somewhat similar to that of nearby Beauvais Cathedral, whose naveless Rayonnant choir is also a contemporary of the abbey's.

Despite its unfinished state, the church still had smaller sections added to it over time. One of the additions at the end of the Middle Ages was the sacristy commissioned by Guy de Baudreuil, which was probably intended initially as a chapel. Built in 1521 in the later Flamboyant style, the sacristy is entered from the easternmost bay of the south aisle, through an ornate portal decorated in a transitional Renaissance style with Italian-inspired statuary. At some point, there was also a small chapel dedicated to Saint Michael that was built connecting to the last bay of the north aisle. However, this was demolished in 1821 and only a low portion of wall survives.

The abbey church also contains several valuable pieces of ecclesiastical art and furniture. Most noteworthy are the two high choir stalls that were commissioned by Abbot Guy de Baudreuil in 1498. These wooden stalls are carved in an elaborate Flamboyant style, with canopies ornamented with flowing vegetal lacework, and handrests and misericords carved with saints, animals, proverbial scenes, and whimsical depictions of village life; as well as some slightly more ominous imaginings of demons, death and the devil. Other works include the remains of some 15th century mural paintings, the finely carved wooden sacristy door, and within the sacristy itself, a Lamentation of Christ statue depicting a lifeless Christ lying before the Virgin Mary, John the Apostle and Mary Magdalene.

Interior, looking east

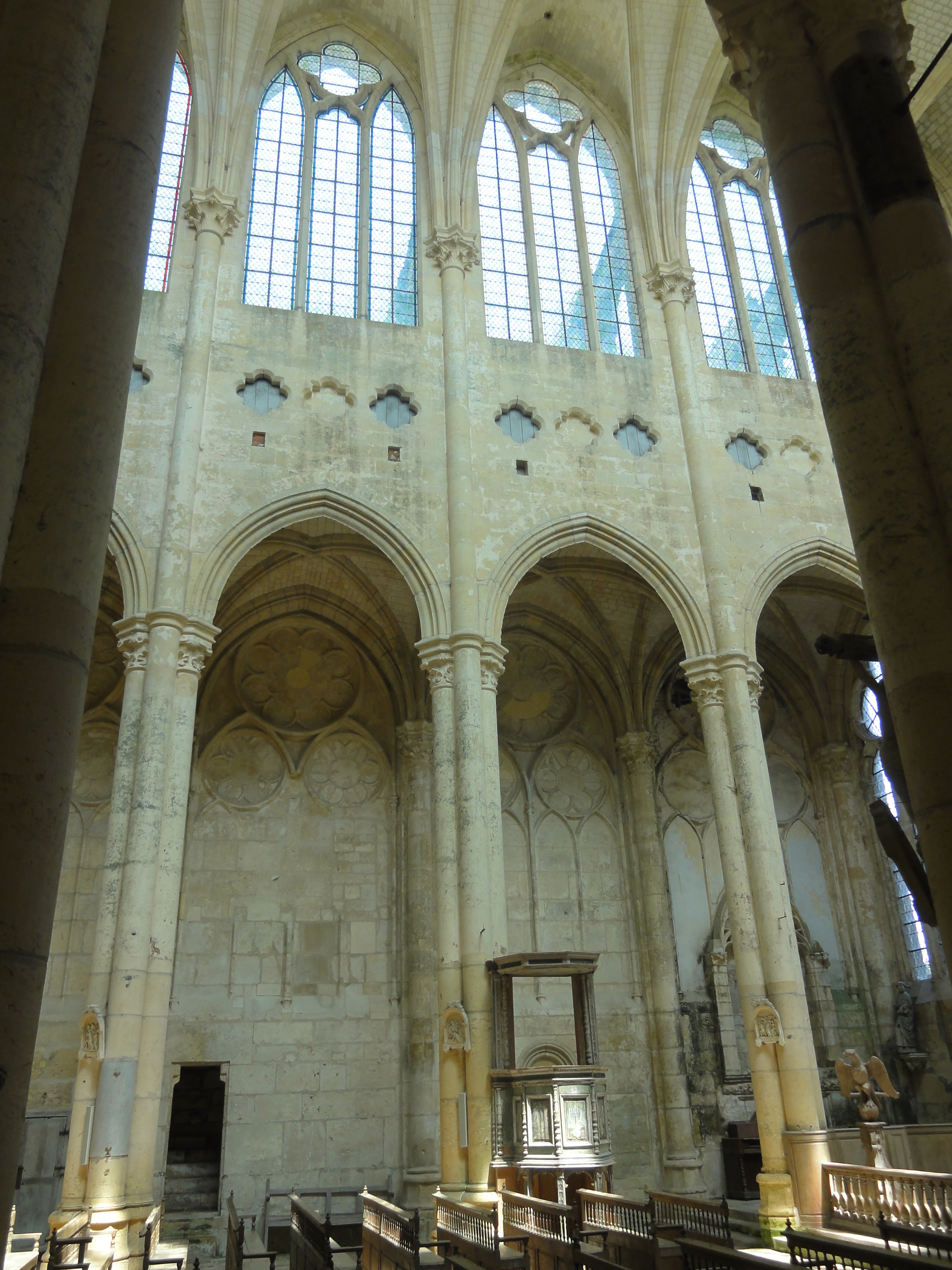
North aisle and clerestory

Apse, with grisaille windows

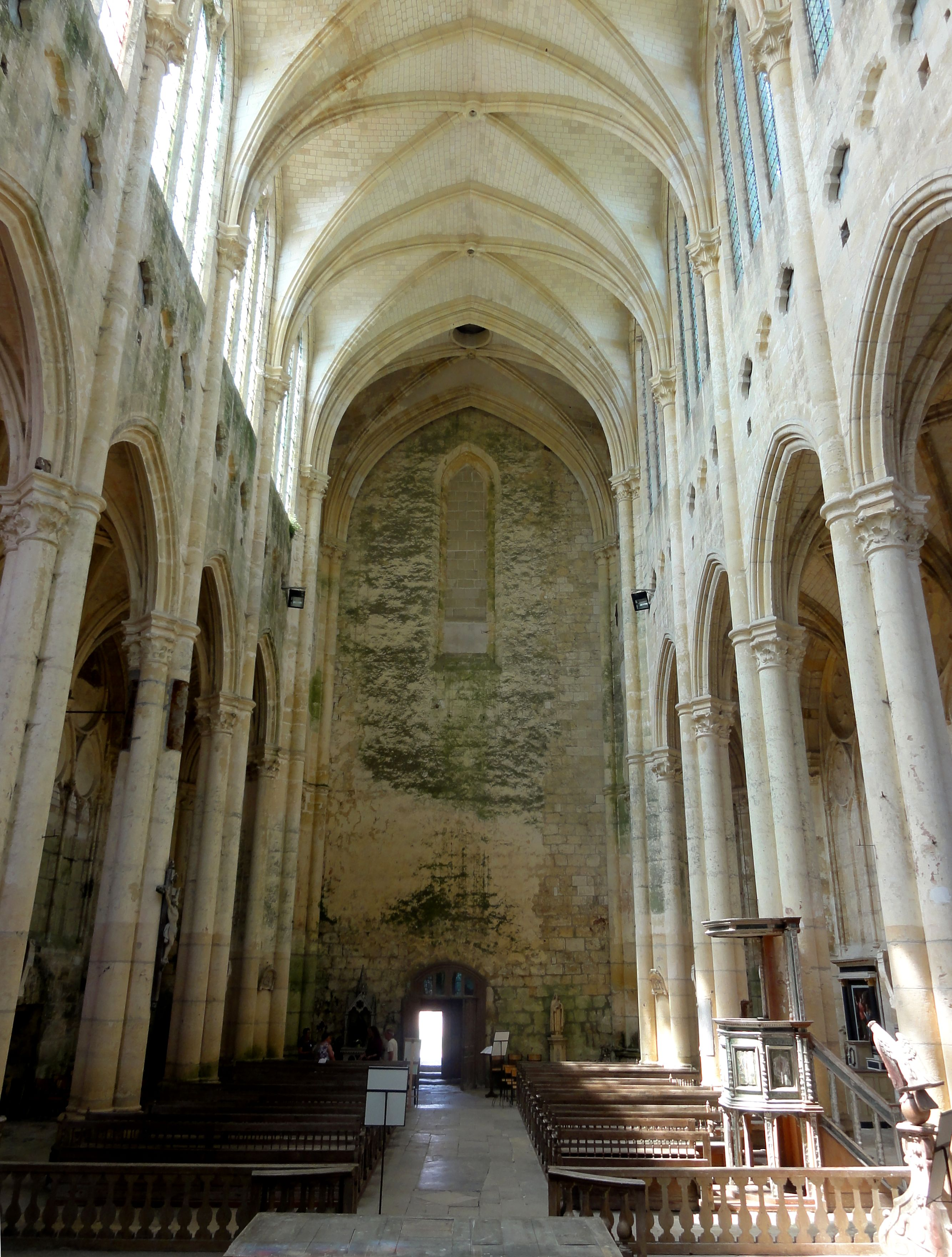
Interior, looking west

Portal to the sacristy

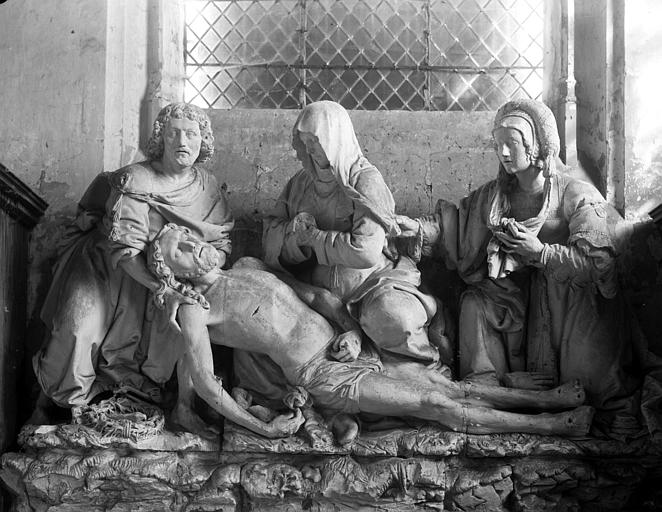
Lamentation of Christ statue

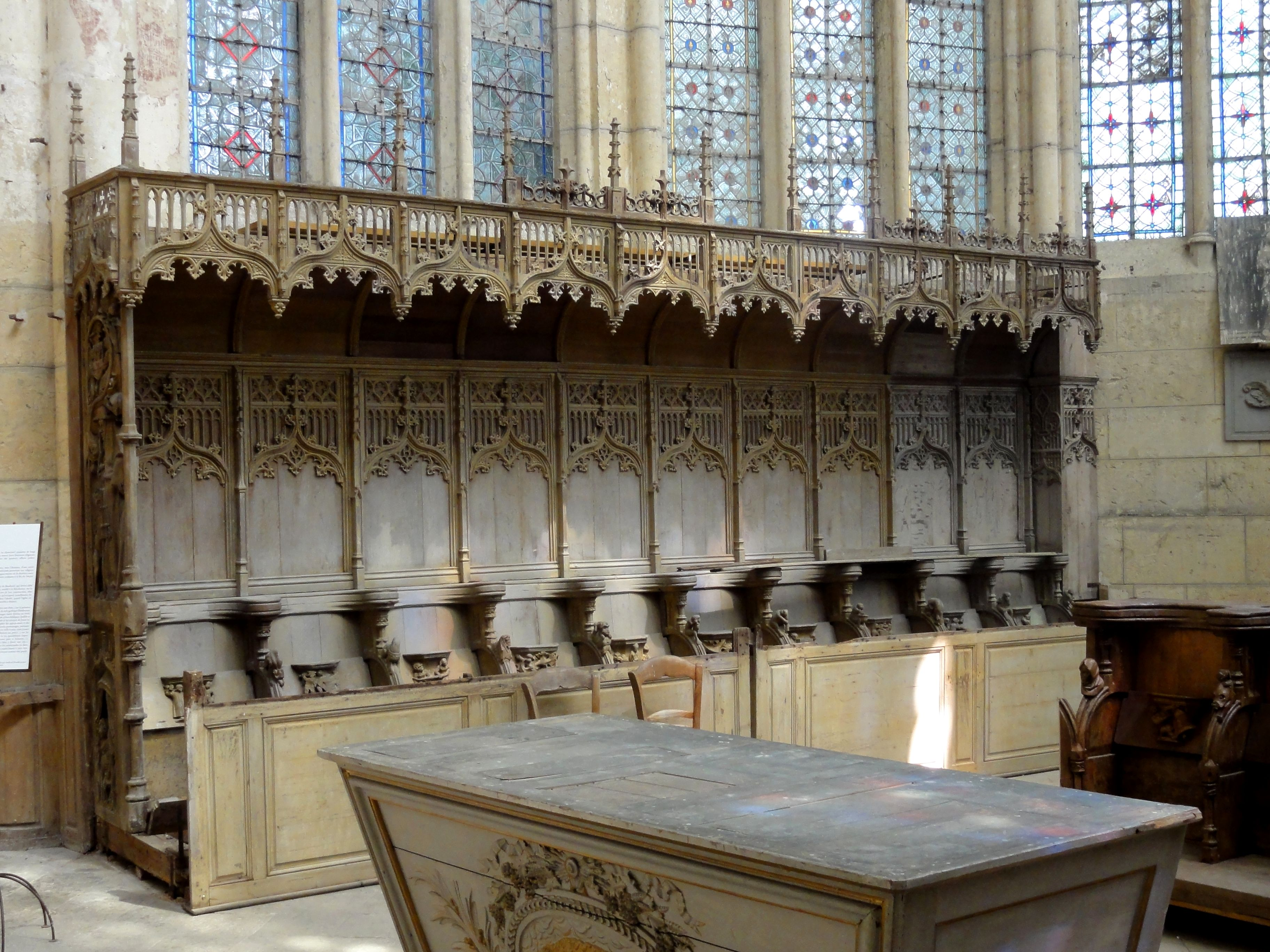
Choir stalls

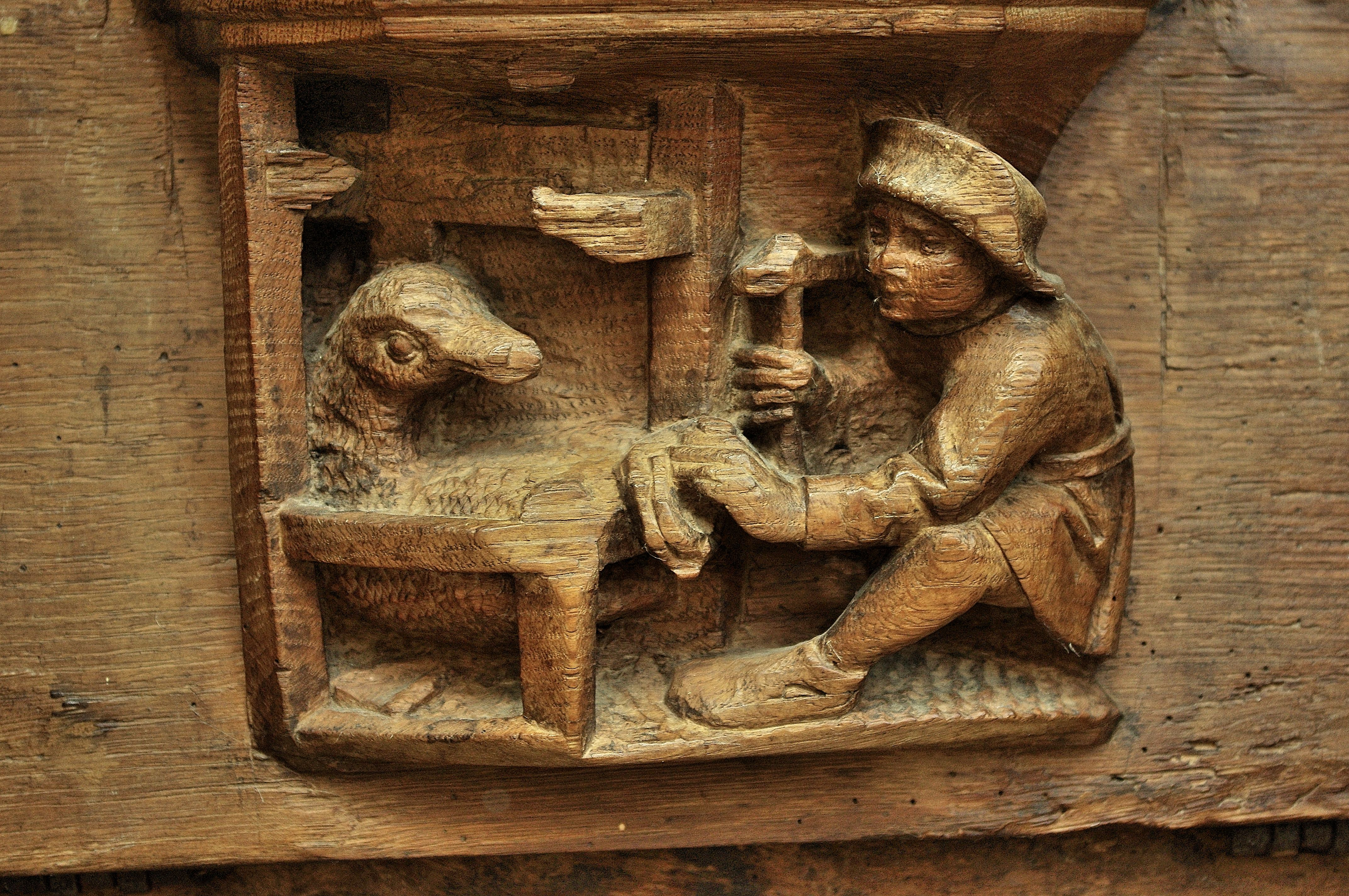
Misericord illustrating an old proverb, "fool as to shoe a goose"

=== Other buildings ===
The medieval compound is still mostly enclosed by its three-metre-high perimeter wall, although most of the core claustral buildings have perished, as many of them were confiscated and sold off during the Revolution. Apart from the church, the abbey's most substantial survival is the Galata: a long, rectangular stone building with a rib-vaulted ground floor, an upper floor and an attic. Likely constructed in the 12th or 13th century, it is thought to have contained the canons' refectory, cellars and guesthouse, later serving as the abbot's lodgings. Small ruins belonging to the newer west wing and the second cloister can also be found near the church, and the arch of the 15th century gatehouse remains standing at the entrance to the complex. Most of the other preserved structures are located along the periphery of the site or on land that is now private property. These were agricultural outbuildings and faremhouses connected to the abbey, one of which was used as a dovecote.

The Galata

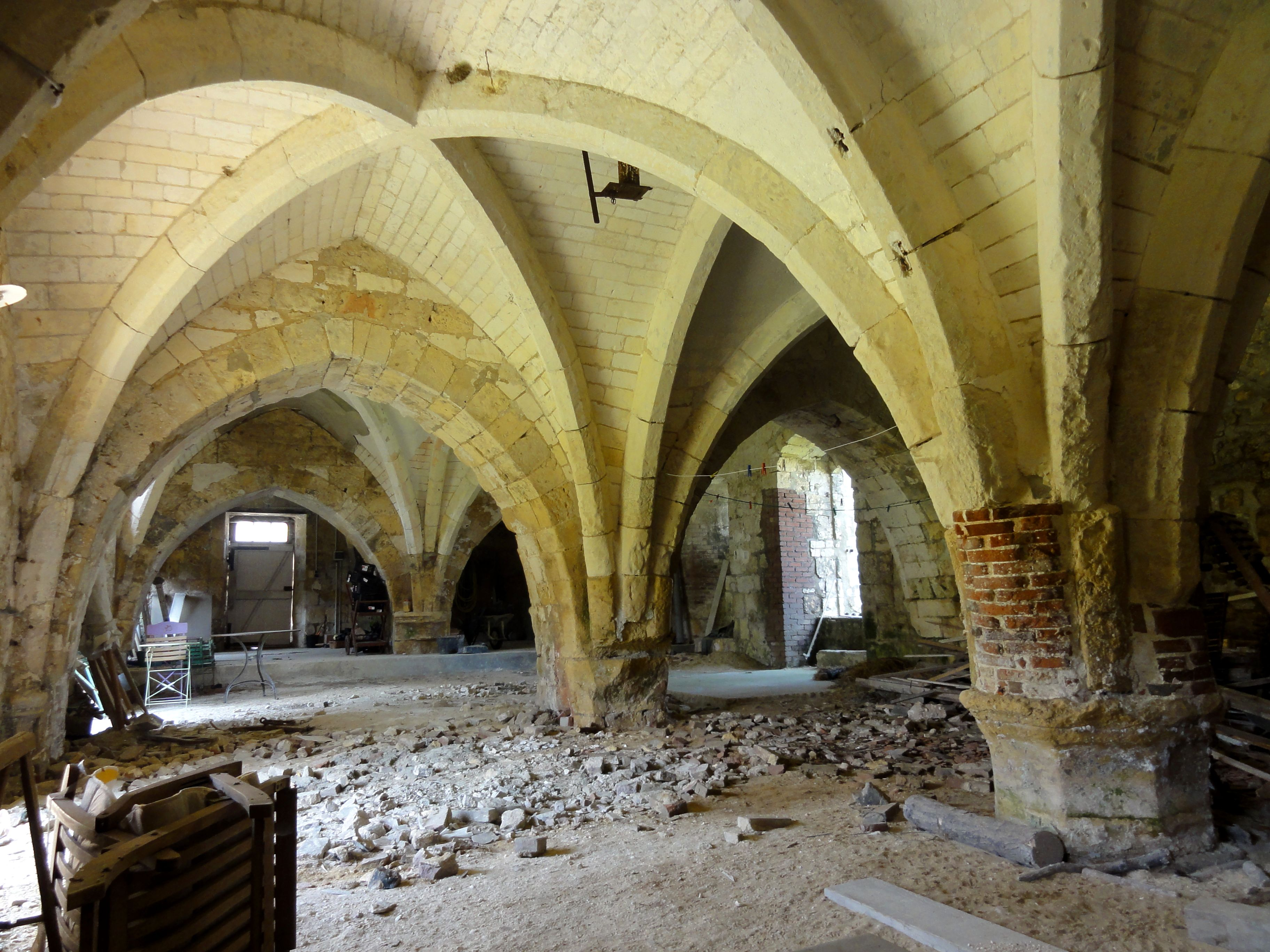
Ground floor of the Galata

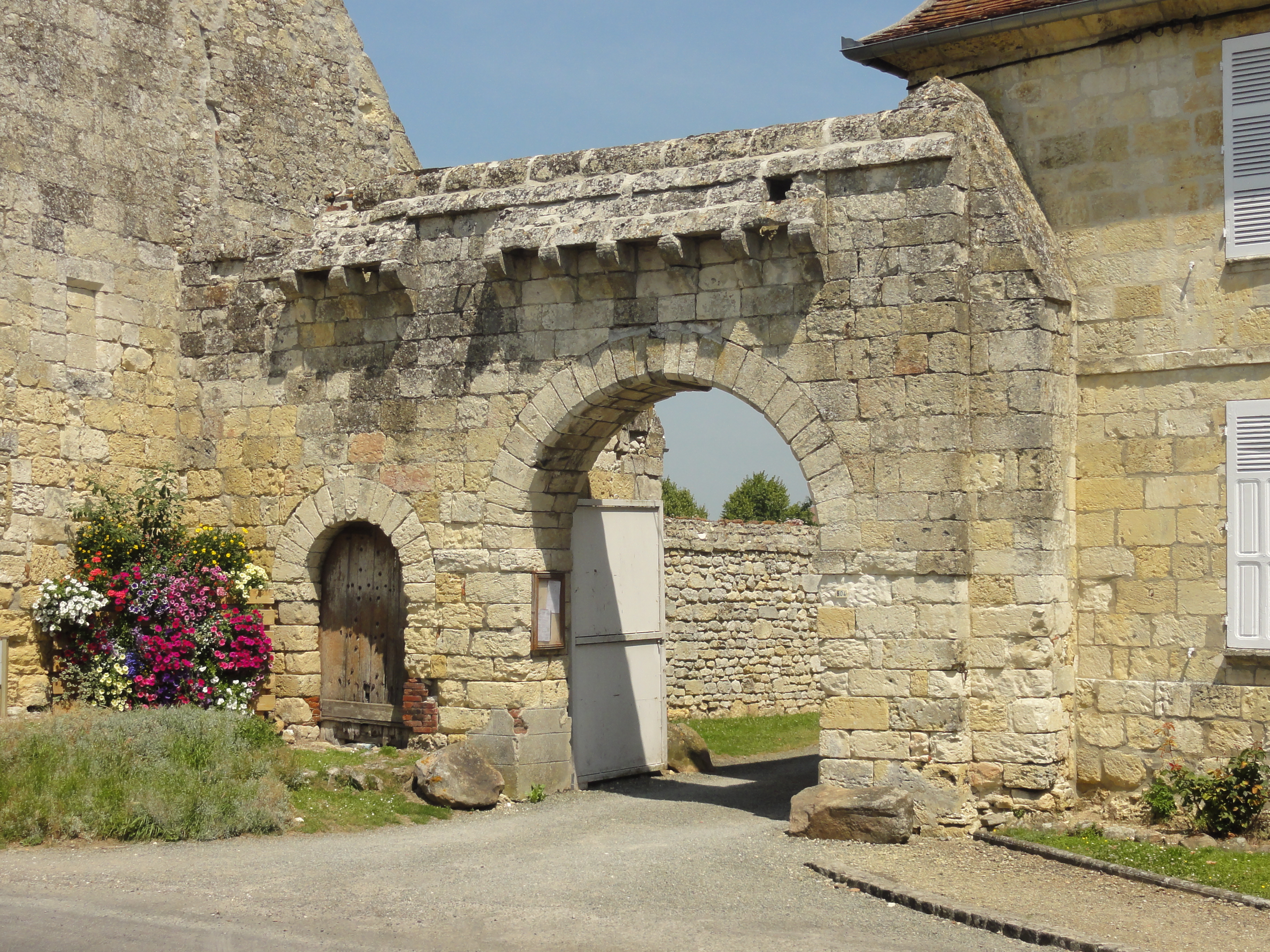
Entrance gate

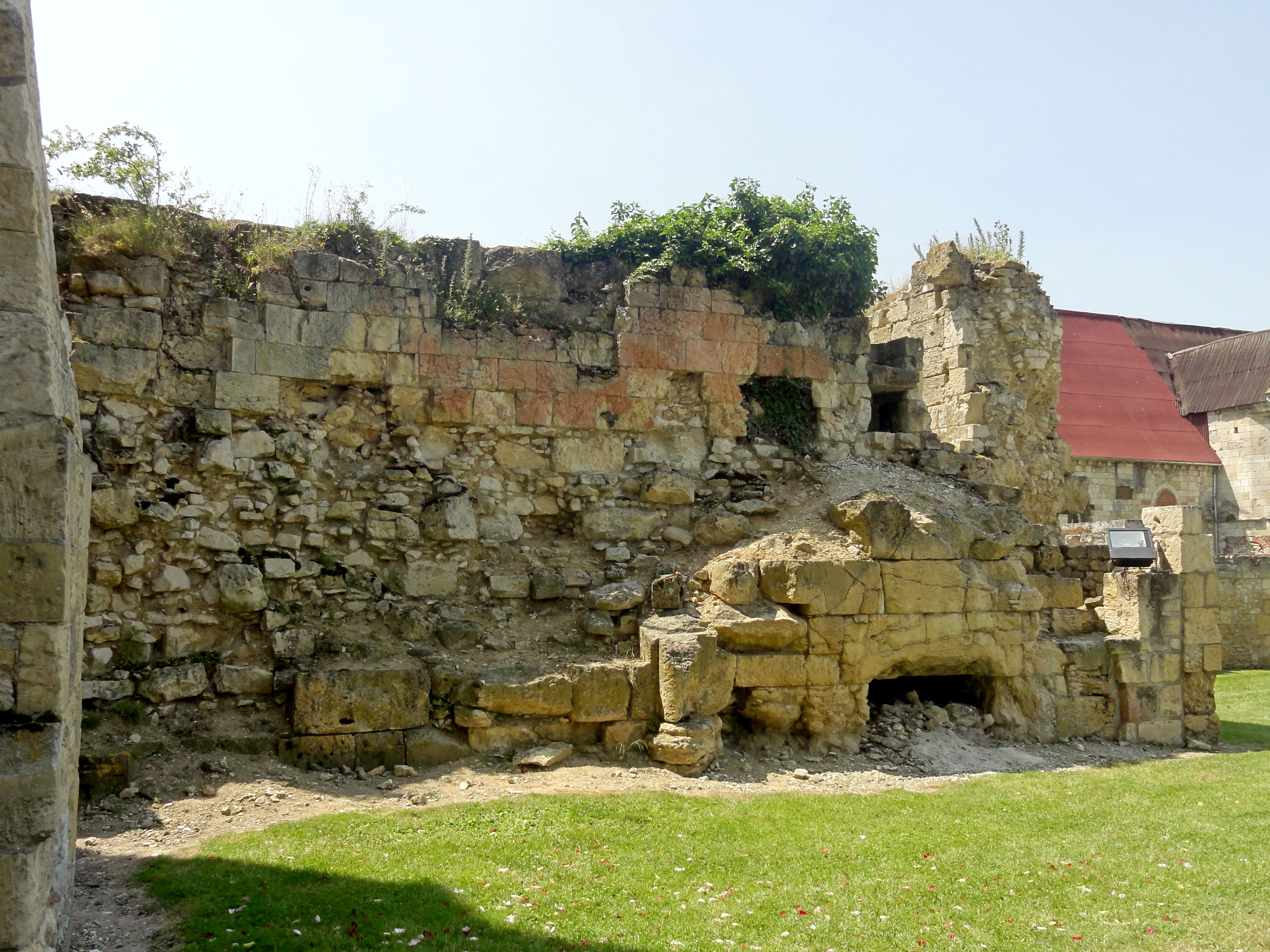
Ruins next to the church

== Bibliography ==
- Bardon, Nicole; Bardon, Louis (1980). "Saint-Martin-aux-Bois (Oise). Esquisse d'une chronique de l'abbaye". Revue archéologique de l'Oise (in French) (18): 19-29.
- Bonnet-Laborderie, Philippe (1993). Découvrir l'Oise (in French). Beauvais: Groupe d'étude des monuments et œuvres d'art de l'Oise et du Beauvaisis (GEMOB). pp. 105–117.
- Du Plessis, Toussaint (1731). Histoire de l'église de Meaux (in French). Vol. 2. Paris. plessis2.
- Graves, Louis (1839). Précis statistique sur le canton de Maignelay, arrondissement de Clermont (Oise) (in French). Beauvais: Achille Desjardins. pp. 65–69.
- Sainte-Marthe, Denis de (1751). Gallia Christiana (La France pontificale) (in French). Vol. 9. Paris: Impr. Royale. pp. 1146 (columns). gall9.
- Vanuxem, Jacques; Vergnet-Ruiz, Jean (1945). "L'église de l'abbaye de Saint-Martin-aux-Bois". Bulletin monumental. 103 (2). Paris: 137–173. doi:10.3406/bulmo.1945.9337. ISSN 2275-5039.
