= Royal Shrovetide Football =

Annual medieval football game played in Ashbourne, England

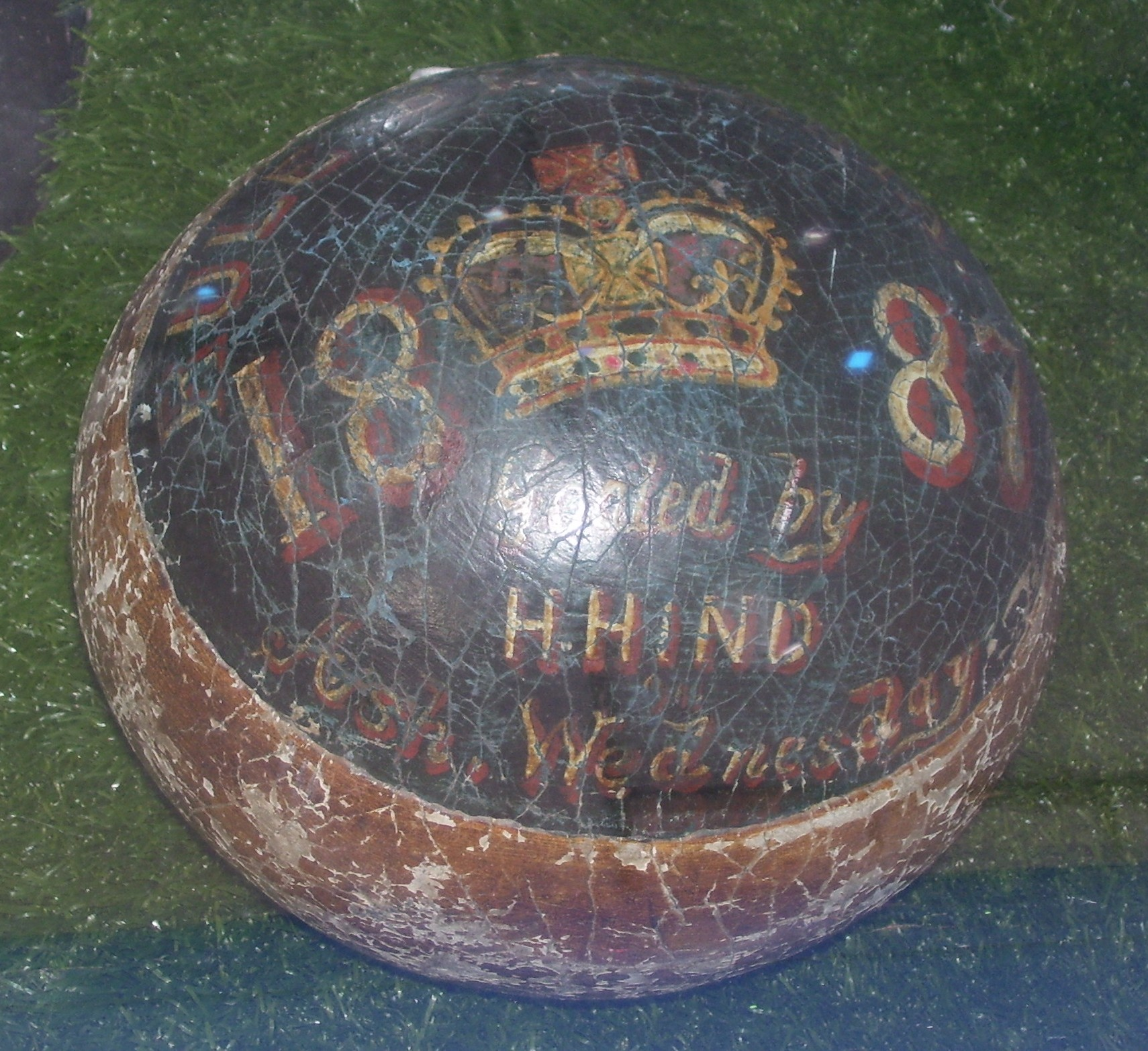
Shrovetide ball goaled by H. Hind on Ash Wednesday 1887 that pre-dates the fire which destroyed the earliest written records of the sport.

Royal Shrovetide Football is a "medieval football" game played annually on Shrove Tuesday and Ash Wednesday in the town of Ashbourne in Derbyshire, England. Shrovetide ball games have been played in England since at least the 12th century from the reign of Henry II (1154–89). The Ashbourne game also known as "hugball" has been played from at least c.1667 although the exact origins of the game are unknown due to a fire at the Royal Shrovetide Committee office in the 1890s which destroyed the earliest records. One of the most popular origin theories suggests the macabre notion that the "ball" was originally a severed head tossed into the waiting crowd following an execution. Although this may have happened, it is more likely that games such as the Winchelsea Streete Game, in Winchelsea, East Sussex, reputedly played during the Hundred Years' War with France, were adaptations of an original ball game intended to show contempt for the enemy.

One of the earliest references to football in the county of Derbyshire comes in a poem called "Burlesque upon the Great Frost" from 1683, written after the English Civil War by Charles Cotton, cousin to Aston Cockayne, Baronet of Ashbourne (1608–84):

Two towns, that long that war had raged
Being at football now engaged
For honour, as both sides pretend,
Left the brave trial to be ended
Till the next thaw for they were frozen
On either part at least a dozen,
With a good handsome space between 'em
Like Rollerich stones, if you've seen 'em
And could no more run, kick, or trip ye
Than I can quaff off Aganippe.

— Charles Cotton (1630–87)

Shrovetide balls typical of those on display in shops and public houses in Ashbourne. These three were on display at the Wheel Inn, Ash Wednesday, 2013. The central ball shows the three cocks that appear on the Cockayne coat of Arms. This image is common to many game balls. To the right is an example of a ball without decoration.

A previously unknown tentative link between Royal Shrovetide football and La soule played in Tricot, Picardy was established in 2012 by history and sociology of sport lecturer Laurent Sébastien Fournier from the Universite de Nantes. Whilst undertaking a study of "folk football", he noticed that the Coat of arms of the Cockayne family (seated in Ashbourne from the 12th century) painted on a 1909 Shrovetide ball displayed in the window of the Ashbourne Telegraph office contained three cockerels in its heraldic design. He recognised this matched the emblem of Tricot (also carrying three cockerels) where La soule is played on the first Sunday of Lent and Easter Monday. He was welcomed to Ashbourne by the Royal Shrovetide Committee and was a guest at the Shrovetide luncheon. Research into Royal Shrovetide Football's lost history is ongoing (August 2012).

== History ==
The concept of the ball game was understood in the Early Middle Ages (600–1066). Writing in the 9th century, Welsh monk and historian Nennius makes reference in his book Historia Brittonum to "the field of Ælecti, in the district of Glevesing, where a party of boys were playing at ball". This account was attributed to a 5th-century source that has not survived. Ball games may have been played throughout the 1st millennium despite a lack of documented evidence. Oral traditions from the West Country and South East Wales assert that the games of Cornish "Hurling to Country" and "Hurling to Goals", Devon "Out-Hurling" and Welsh "Cnapan" played during Christian festivals have more ancient Celtic origins. The wooden balls used in these games are only found in regions where Celtic culture is still venerated. These communal events may even have started with prehistoric workers hurling forward carved wooden balls or stone balls that archaeologists have theorised could have been used to move megaliths in stone circle construction. Records from antiquity have survived relating to various ball games played by the Romans, notably Harpastum which contained many elements that feature in the Shrovetide ball game. These influences were available to a Catholic Church Clergy familiar with native customs and educated in Latin when a ball game was introduced to Shrovetide festivities.

The earliest recorded Shrovetide ball game comes during the High Middle Ages (1066–1272) from the cleric William Fitzstephen in his description of London Descriptio Nobilissimae Civitatis Londoniae (c.1174–83). The game he witnessed was played at Carnival, an alternative name for Shrovetide, from the Latin Carnilevaria, a word variant of carne levare meaning to "leave out meat" an act of abstinence for Lent. Then as now games were played in the afternoon. His account suggests playing ball at Carnival had been an annual event for at least a generation.

…"every year on the day called Carnival—to begin with the sports of boys (for we were all boys once)—scholars from the different schools bring fighting-cocks to their masters, and the whole morning is set apart to watch their cocks do battle in the schools, for the boys are given a holiday that day. After dinner all the young men of the town go out into the fields in the suburbs to play ball. The scholars of the various schools have their own ball, and almost all the followers of each occupation have theirs also. The seniors and the fathers and the wealthy magnates of the city come on horseback to watch the contests of the younger generation, and in their turn recover their lost youth: the motions of their natural heat seem to be stirred in them at the mere sight of such strenuous activity and by their participation in the joys of unbridled youth."

The location given for the "suburbs" was to the north of London. The area described of open fields and rivers is typical of the terrain still used for current games played in Ashbourne and in Workington, Cumbria, where "Uppies and Downies" games take place on Good Friday, Easter Tuesday and Easter Saturday.

…"Everywhere outside the houses of those living in the suburbs, and adjacent to them, are the spacious and beautiful gardens of the citizens, and these are planted with trees. Also there are on the north side pastures and pleasant meadow lands through which flow streams wherein the turning of mill-wheels makes a cheerful sound"….

Although the names of the schools that participated were not stipulated, a previous reference to St. Paul's, Holy Trinity Priory and St. Martin-le-Grand College indicates these Church schools were integral to celebrating this holy-day.

…"St. Paul, the church of the Holy Trinity, and the church of St. Martin have famous schools by special privilege and by virtue of their ancient dignity. But through the favour of some magnate, or through the presence of teachers who are notable or famous in philosophy, there are also other schools"….

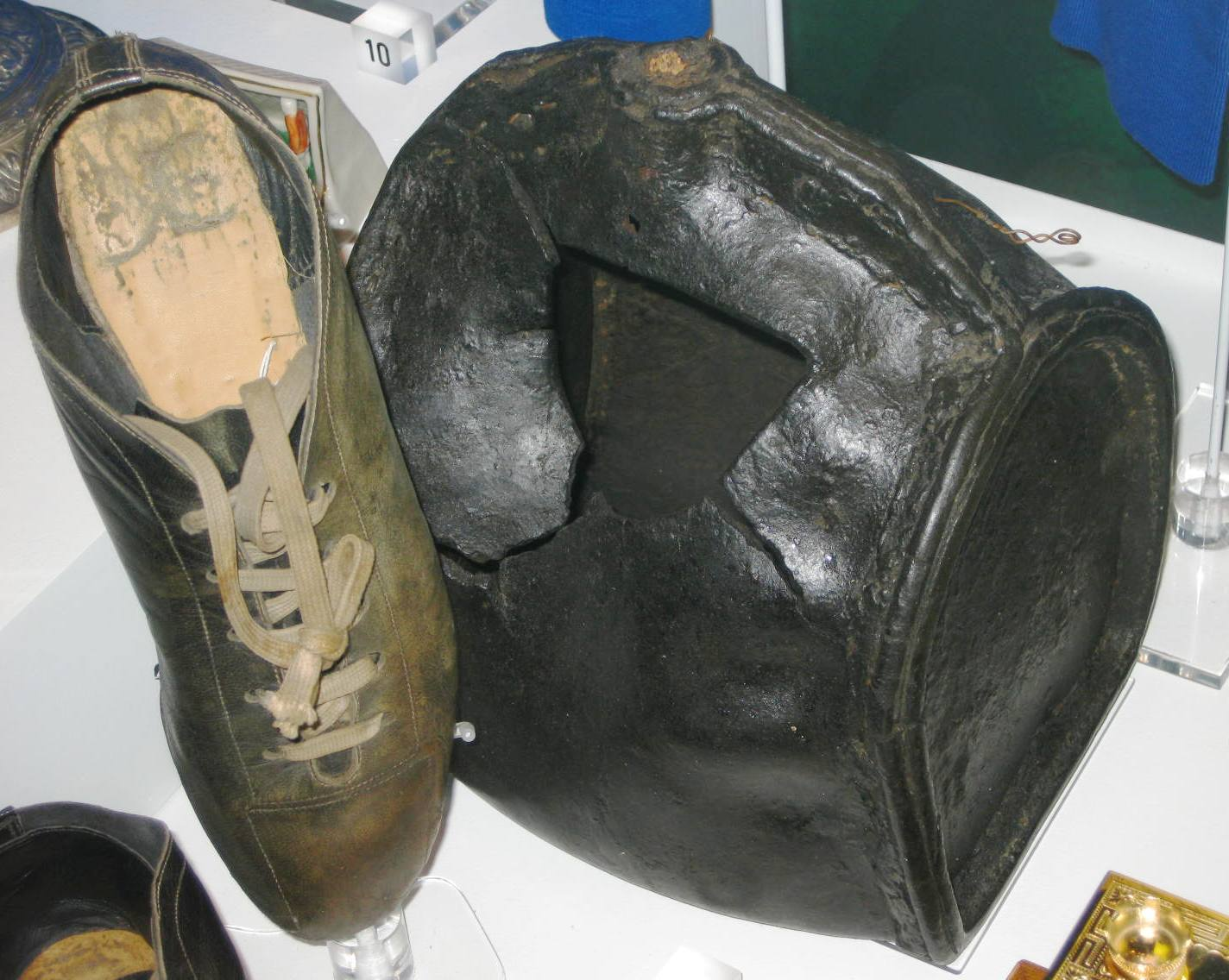
Leather bottle used in village football from the 1800s on display at the National Football Museum, Manchester.

By the Late Middle Ages (1272–1485) there were many incarnations of the ball game being played at Shrovetide, Eastertide and Christmastide in and around the British Isles. All were played in a similar manner with localized innovations. Some of the other better-understood games, a few of which are still played, include the Ba' game (ba' being an abbreviation of "ball"), the Atherstone Ball Game, the Sedgefield Ball Game, Bottle-kicking (usually with a leather bottle as a substitute for the ball), Caid (an Irish name for various ball games and an animal-skin ball), Camp-ball (late medieval includes "kicking camp"), Football (late medieval), The Shrove Tuesday Football Ceremony of the Purbeck Marblers (Masonic ceremonial), Haxey Hood ("Hood" being the name given to a leather tube used instead of a ball), La soule (soule being the name for the ball in northern France), and Scoring the Hales (an alternative name for goals used in Cumbria and the Scottish borders). A contemporary collective term coined for these games is "Mob football".

During the early modern period public schools open to the paying public (an alternative to private home education) adopted the ball game as a sports activity. The version they developed was called football and was played using a bladder-inflated ball. Scholars from these schools wrote the first standard codes for football. These inspired the development of modern codes of football, many created by the descendants of emigrants who spread the concept of football around the world.

== Table showing codes of conduct development to modern football ==
Celtic/Roman ball games (Antiquity)	Mob football (Medieval)	Public-school football (Modern)	Cambridge rules (1848–1863)	Association football (1863)		
Celtic/Roman ball games (Antiquity)	Mob football (Medieval)	Public-school football (Modern)	Cambridge rules (1848–1863)	Association football (1863)	7-a-side	
Celtic/Roman ball games (Antiquity)	Mob football (Medieval)	Public-school football (Modern)	Cambridge rules (1848–1863)	Association football (1863)	Beach (1992)	
Celtic/Roman ball games (Antiquity)	Mob football (Medieval)	Public-school football (Modern)	Cambridge rules (1848–1863)	Association football (1863)	Futsal (1930)	
Celtic/Roman ball games (Antiquity)	Mob football (Medieval)	Public-school football (Modern)	Sheffield rules (1857)	Association football (1863)		
Celtic/Roman ball games (Antiquity)	Mob football (Medieval)	Public-school football (Modern)	Sheffield rules (1857)	Association football (1863)	Indoor	
Celtic/Roman ball games (Antiquity)	Mob football (Medieval)	Public-school football (Modern)	Sheffield rules (1857)	Association football (1863)	Paralympic	
Celtic/Roman ball games (Antiquity)	Mob football (Medieval)	Public-school football (Modern)	Sheffield rules (1857)	Association football (1863)	Street	
Celtic/Roman ball games (Antiquity)	Mob football (Medieval)	Public-school football (Modern)	Rugby football (1845)	Association football (1863)		
Celtic/Roman ball games (Antiquity)	Mob football (Medieval)	Public-school football (Modern)	Rugby football (1845)	Association football (1863)	Rugby union (1871)	
Celtic/Roman ball games (Antiquity)	Mob football (Medieval)	Public-school football (Modern)	Rugby football (1845)	Rugby sevens (1883)	Rugby union (1871)	
Celtic/Roman ball games (Antiquity)	Mob football (Medieval)	Public-school football (Modern)	Rugby football (1845)	Rugby league (1895)	Rugby union (1871)	
Celtic/Roman ball games (Antiquity)	Mob football (Medieval)	Public-school football (Modern)	Rugby football (1845)	Rugby league (1895)	Rugby union (1871)	Nines
Celtic/Roman ball games (Antiquity)	Mob football (Medieval)	Public-school football (Modern)	Rugby football (1845)	Rugby league (1895)	Rugby union (1871)	Beach rugby
Celtic/Roman ball games (Antiquity)	Mob football (Medieval)	Public-school football (Modern)	Rugby football (1845)	Rugby league (1895)	Rugby union (1871)	Touch football
Celtic/Roman ball games (Antiquity)	Mob football (Medieval)	Public-school football (Modern)	Rugby football (1845)	American football (1869)		Arena football (1987)
Celtic/Roman ball games (Antiquity)	Mob football (Medieval)	Public-school football (Modern)	Rugby football (1845)	Canadian football (1861)		Flag football
Celtic/Roman ball games (Antiquity)	Mob football (Medieval)	Public-school football (Modern)	Gaelic (1887)			International rules (1967)
Celtic/Roman ball games (Antiquity)	Mob football (Medieval)	Public-school football (Modern)	Australian rules (1859)			International rules (1967)

== The Ashbourne game ==
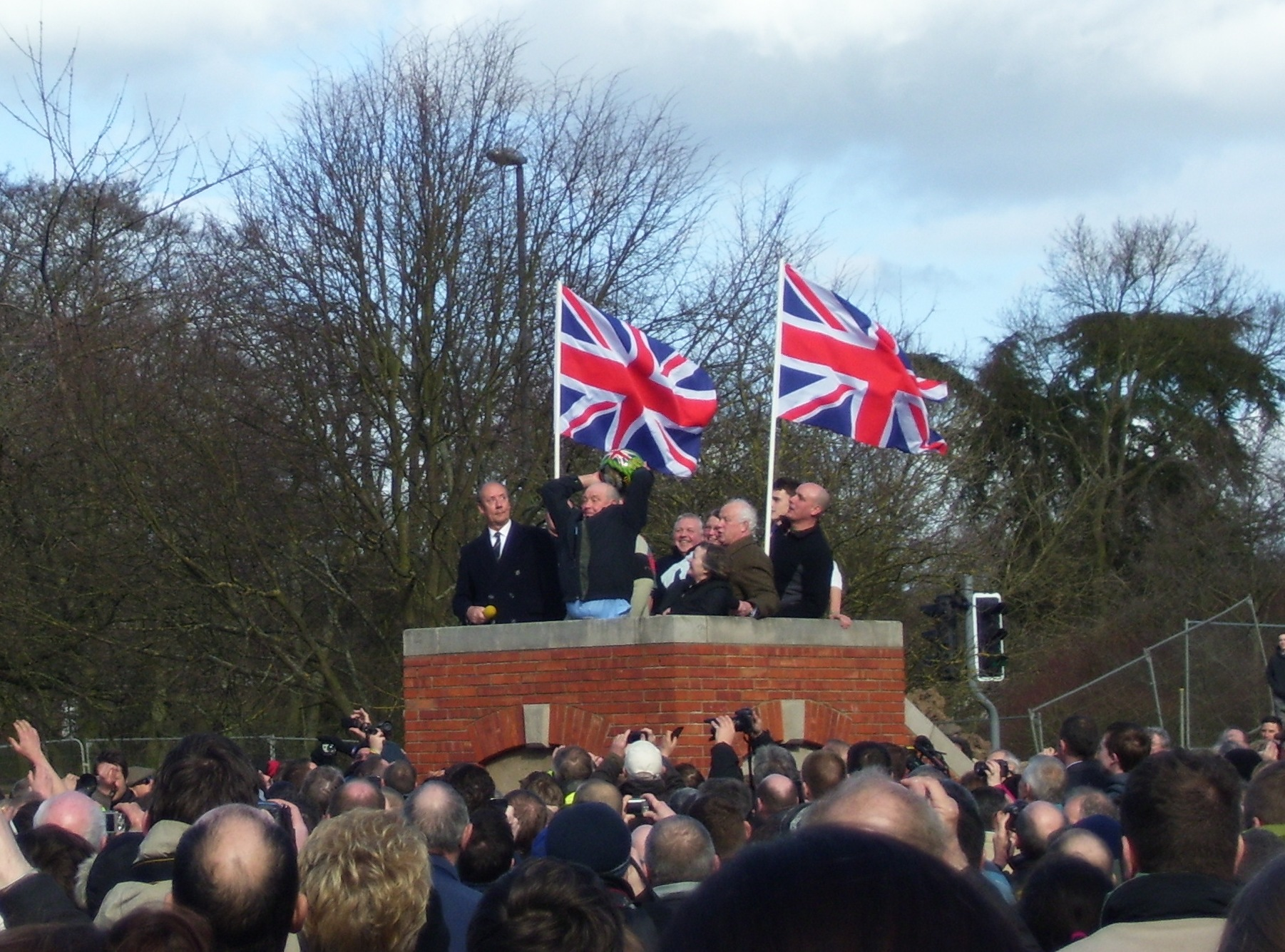
Ball being "turned up" from the "plinth" at Shawcroft car park located along the line of a culverted section of Henmore Brook on Ash Wednesday 2011

The game is played over two days on Shrove Tuesday and Ash Wednesday, starting each day at 2:00 pm and lasting until 10:00 pm. If the goal is scored (in local parlance, the ball is goaled) before 6pm a new ball is released and play restarts from the town centre, otherwise play ends for the day. The ball is rarely kicked, though it is legal to kick, carry or throw it. Instead it generally moves through the town in a series of hugs, like a giant scrum in rugby, made up of dozens if not hundreds of people. When the ball is goaled, the scorer is carried on the shoulders of his colleagues into the courtyard of the Green Man Royal Hotel (this ceremony returned to its recognised spiritual home in 2014 after an absence in 2013 due to the closure of the hotel).

The two teams that play the game are known as the Up'Ards and the Down'Ards (local dialect for "upwards and downwards"). The Up'Ards are traditionally those town members born north of Henmore Brook, which runs through the town, and Down'Ards are those born south of the river. Each team attempts to carry the ball back to their own goal from the turn-up, rather than the more traditional method of scoring at/in the opponents goal. There are two goal posts 3 miles (4.8 km) apart, one at Sturston Mill (where the Up'Ards attempt to score), the other at Clifton Mill (where the Down'Ards score). Although the mills have long since been demolished, part of their millstones still stand on the bank of the river at each location and indeed themselves once served as the scoring posts. In 1996 the scoring posts were replaced once again by new smaller millstones mounted onto purpose-built stone structures, which are still in use to this day and require the players to actually be in the river in order to "goal" a ball, as this was seen as more challenging.

The actual process of "goaling" a ball requires a player to hit it against the millstone three successive times. This is not a purely random event, however, as the eventual scorer is elected en route to the goal and would typically be someone who lives in Ashbourne or at least whose family is well known to the community. The chances of a "tourist" goaling a ball are very remote, though they are welcome to join in the effort to reach the goal. When a ball is "goaled" that particular game ends.

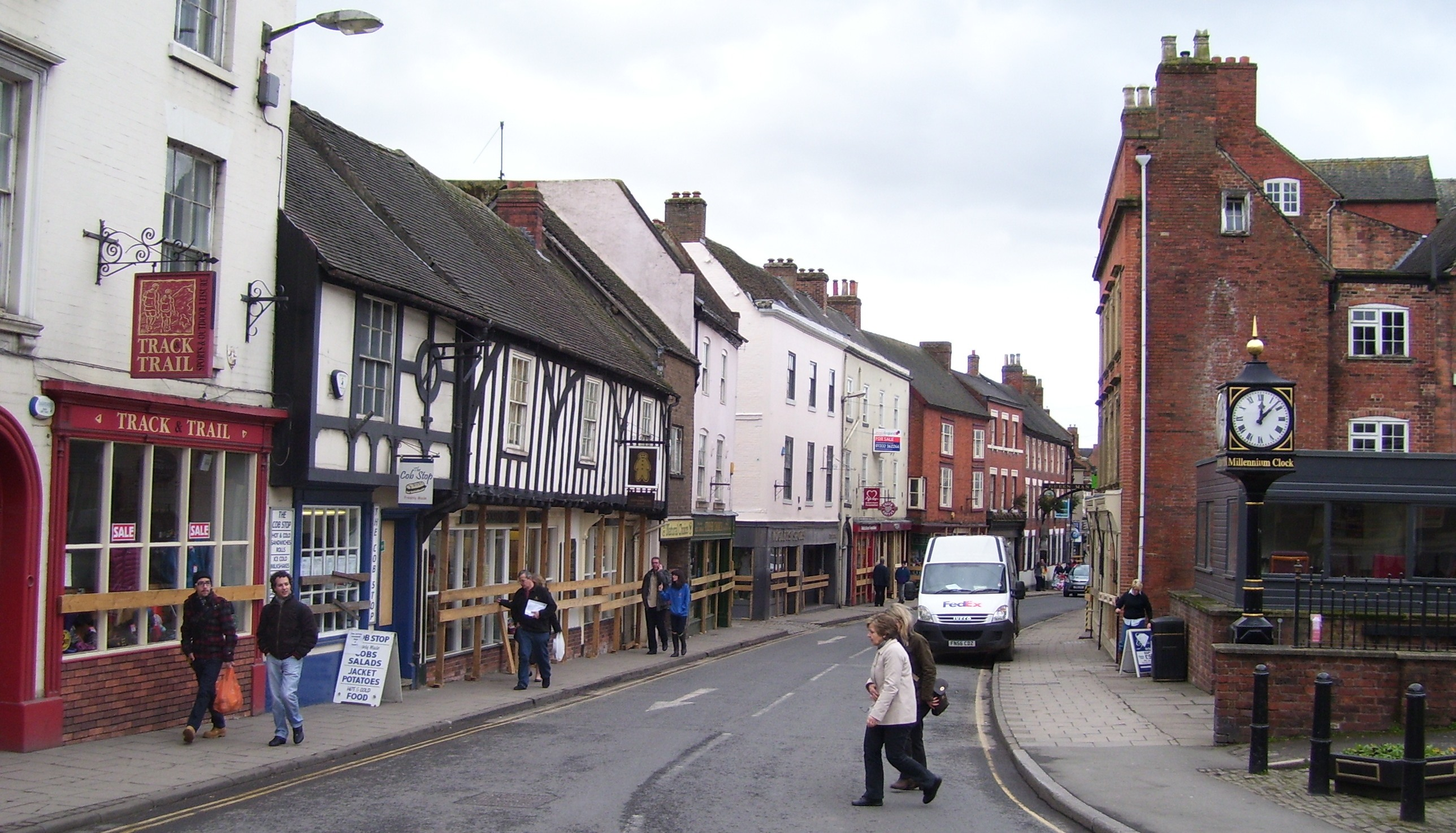
Shops on the approach to the Green Man & Black Head public house boarded up before the games commence.

The game is played through the town with no limit on the number of players or the playing area (aside from those mentioned in the rules below). Thus shops in the town are boarded up during the game, and people are encouraged to park their cars away from the main streets. The game is started from a special plinth in the town centre where the ball is thrown to the players (or "turned-up" in the local parlance), often by a visiting dignitary. Before the ball is turned-up, the assembled crowd sing "Auld Lang Syne" followed by "God Save the King". The starting point has not changed in many years, although the town has changed around it; as a consequence, the starting podium is currently located in the town's main car park, which is named Shaw Croft, this being the ancient name of the field in which it stands.

The game has been known as "Royal" since 1928, when the then-Prince of Wales (later King Edward VIII) turned up the ball. The prince suffered a bloody nose. The game received royal assent for a second time in 2003, when the game was once again started by the Prince of Wales, in this instance Prince Charles (later King Charles III). On this occasion, the prince threw the ball into play from a raised plinth. It is traditional for the dignitary of the day to be raised aloft near Compton Bridge, as the turner-up is escorted into the Shawcroft en route from the luncheon at the Leisure centre.

=== The goals ===
External videos
- Official players committee footage
- Review of Shrovetide 2013
- Tuesday Up'ard Goal Shrovetide 2012
- Wednesday Down'ard Goal Shrovetide 2012

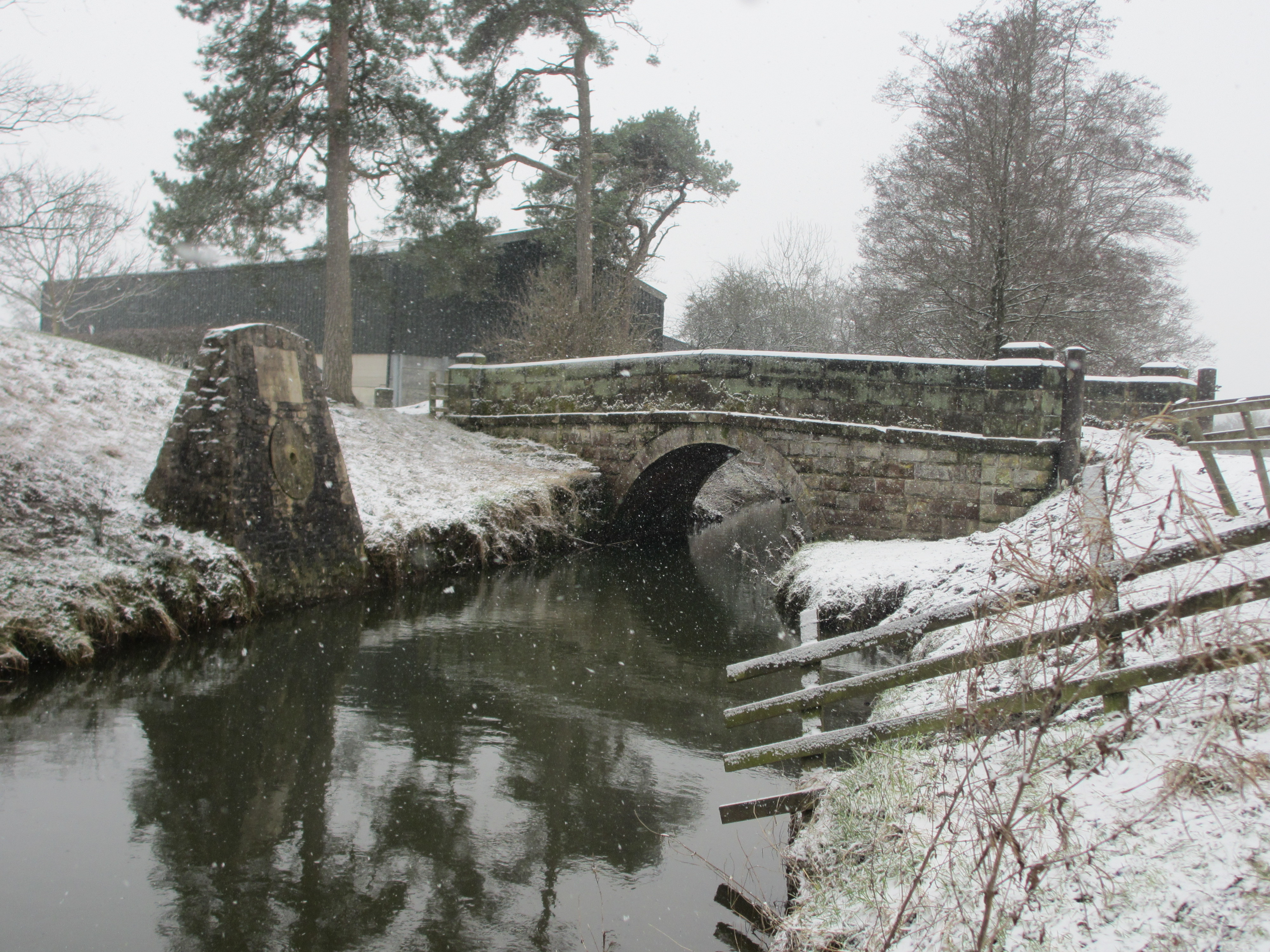
Up'Ards purpose-built goal at Sturston Mill, upstream from the plinth at Shawcroft

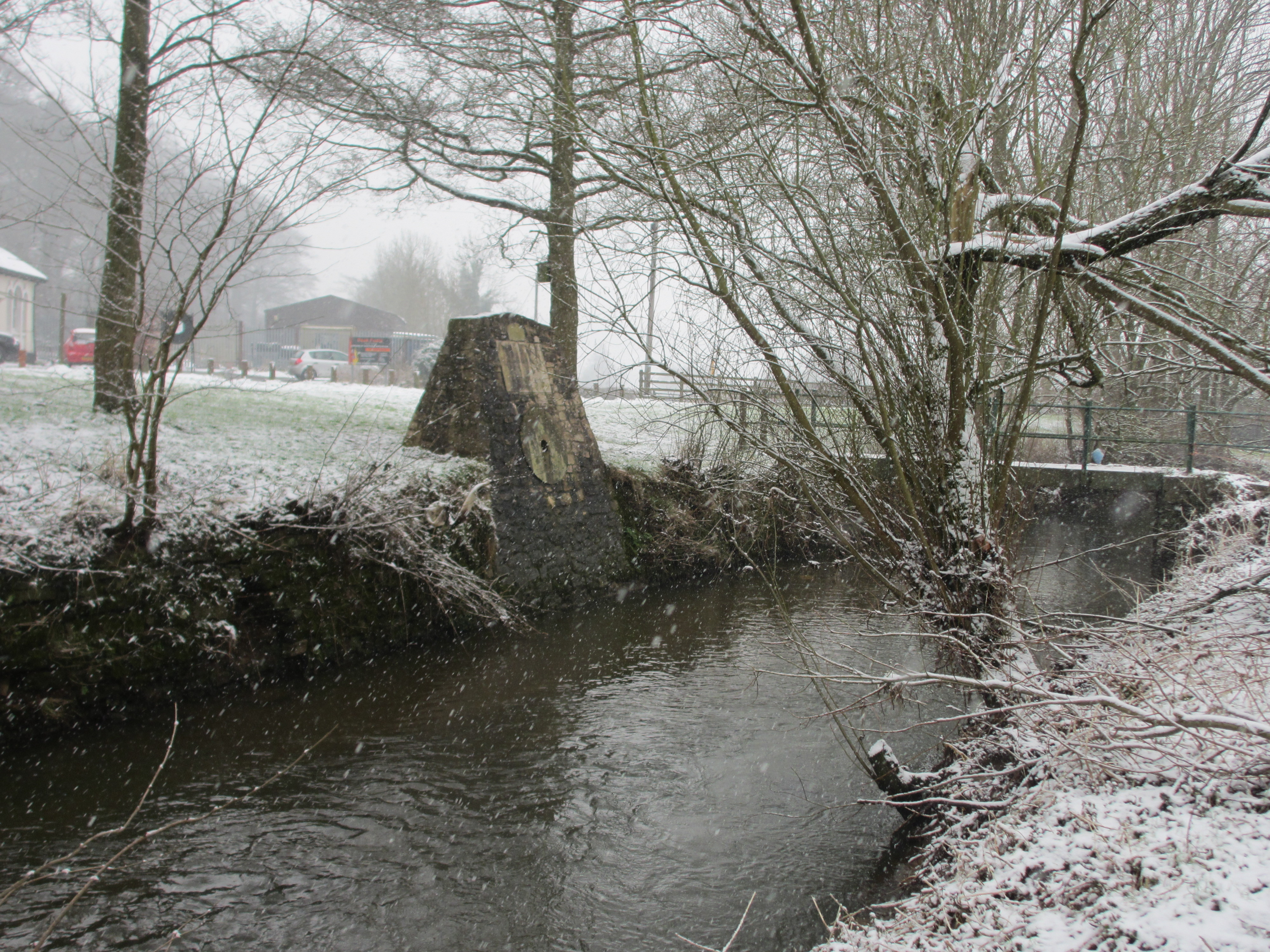
Down'Ards purpose-built goal at Clifton Mill, downstream from the plinth at Shawcroft

The Up'Ards' traditional goal was Sturston Mill in Sturston village east of Asbourne and the Down'Ards' goal was Clifton Mill in the village of Clifton west of Ashbourne. Clifton Mill was demolished in 1967. A stone obelisk with commemorative plaque marking the site was unveiled in 1968. This became the Down'Ards goal for the next 28 years. Sturston Mill was demolished in 1981. A timber post salvaged from the mill was erected on the site of the old mill to act as a goal for the Up'Ards. The purpose-built goals erected in 1996 on the banks of Henmore Brook are located 3 miles (4.8 km) apart. The Up'Ards goal is upstream from Shawcroft adjacent to the site of the former Sturston Mill and the Down'Ards goal is downstream from Shawcroft adjacent to the site of the former Clifton Mill. The ball is goaled when tapped three times against a millstone incorporated in the goals.

=== The ball ===
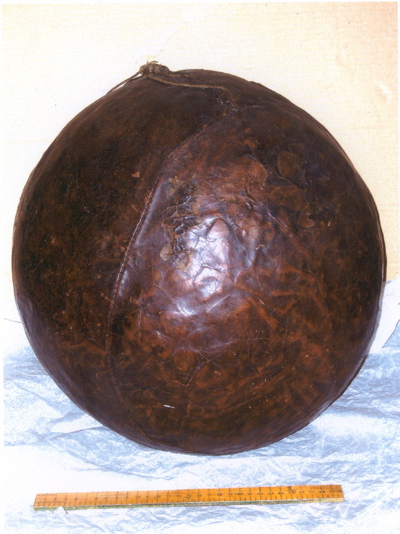
A Shrovetide football preserved in Derby Museum.

The game is played with a special ball, larger than a standard football, which is filled with Portuguese cork to help the ball float when it ends up in the river. It is now hand-painted by local craftsmen specially for the occasion, and the design is usually related to the dignitary who will be turning-up the ball. Once a ball is goaled it is repainted with the name and in the design of the scorer and is theirs to keep. If a ball is not goaled it is repainted in the design of the dignitary that turned it up and given back to them to keep. Many of the balls are put on display in the local pubs during the game for the public to view; traditionally these pubs are divided by team (The Wheel Inn being a popular Down'Ard base, and the Old Vaults for the Up'ards, for example).

=== The rules ===
There are very few rules in existence. The main ones are:

- Committing murder or manslaughter is prohibited. Unnecessary violence is frowned upon.
- The ball may not be carried in a motorised vehicle.
- The ball may not be hidden in a bag, coat or rucksack, etc.
- Cemeteries, churchyards and the town memorial gardens are strictly out of bounds.
- Playing after 10 pm is forbidden.
- To score a goal the ball must be tapped three times in the area of the goal.

== Results ==
=== Scores ===
- 2000: Draw 1 (Spencer, U) – 1 (Harrison, D)
- 2001: Cancelled due to the 2001 United Kingdom foot-and-mouth outbreak
- 2002: Up'ards win 1 (Maskell) – 0
- 2003: Up'ards win 2 (Brown, Hallam) – 1 (Millward)
- 2004: Draw 0 – 0
- 2005: Up'ards win 1 (Hill) – 0
- 2006: Draw 1 (Lemon, U) – 1 (Harwood, D)
- 2007: Up'ards win 1 (Slater) – 0
- 2008: Up'ards win 2 (Lemon, Burtonshaw) – 0
- 2009: Draw 1 (Wright, U) – 1 (Bloor, D)
- 2010: Down'ards win 1 (Clarke) – 0
- 2011: Draw 2 (Webb, Betteridge, D) – 2 (Goodall, Fisher, U)
- 2012: Draw 1 (Jones, U) – 1 (Mee, D)
- 2013: Draw 1 (Spencer, U) – 1 (Carter, D)
- 2014: Up'ards win 2 (Naylor, Keeling) – 0
- 2015: Up'ards win 1–0
- 2016: Draw 1 (Ratcliffe, U) – 1 (Etherington, D)
- 2017: Up'ards win 1 (Smith) – 0
- 2018: Draw 1 (Swan, U) – 1 (Boulton-Lear, D)
- 2019: Down'ards win 1 (Smith) – 0
- 2020: Draw 1 (Leighton, U) – 1 (Frith, D)
- 2021: Cancelled due to the COVID-19 pandemic
- 2022: Up'ards win 3 (Lyon, Maznenko, Weston) – 1 (Harrison)
- 2023: Up'ards win 1 (Allen) – 0
- 2024: Up'ards win 2 (Nash, Maznenko) – 0
- 2025: Down'ards win 1 (Taylor) – 0
- 2026: Up'ards win 3 (Brown, Redfern, Sellers) – 0

=== Roll of Honour ===
Since 1891 a "Roll of Honour" has been kept, documenting both the turner-up and scorer of each game played. It can be seen from the list that the event has only been cancelled three times during that time, once in 1968, again in 2001, both times due to the outbreak of Foot-and-mouth disease and in 2021 due to the outbreak of COVID-19. Even during both World Wars the games were played; indeed, the Ashbourne Regiment even played a version of the game in the German trenches during the First World War.

On 7 March 1916 the 1/6th Battalion of the Sherwood Foresters (Notts and Derby) Regiment played a game whilst stationed in the French village of Ivergny. The ball was presented by the Ashbourne Committee and the first goal was scored by Private Robinson of "C" Company.

A series of wooden display frames carrying the names that are updated yearly are displayed at the new Ashbourne Library on Compton. The boards were originally in the Green Man, but were removed from there after the hotel shut in 2012.

== Local dialect ==
The following are words and phrases used at the game, with a brief explanation of their meaning:

Turner-up
The person who starts that day's game.
Turning up
The act of throwing the ball from the "plinth" into the crowd of waiting players to start a game.
Hug
The scrum-like formation that naturally forms as the Up'Ards and Down'Ards battle for the ball.
Break
When the ball is released from the hug and play moves quickly.
Runners
Players that wait on the outside of the hug for the ball to break in order to collect the ball and cover as much ground as possible in the direction of their team's goal. There are selected runners for each team and they train regularly throughout the year, usually by running from goal to goal.
River play
As the name suggests, this is a reference to the sections of the game played in the river; as with runners there will be members of the team that specialise in river play. It is possible for the entire game to be played solely in the river.
Clifton
The Down'ards goal location.
Sturston
The Up'ards goal location.
Duck
Local colloquialism used as a friendly greeting, for example "Do you know where the ball is, duck?" Comparable words from other regions would include "mate" or "pet'".
The Green Man Royal Hotel
Name of the pub/hotel where the pre-game dinner was hosted and speeches given; the turner-up was carried from here on the shoulders of the players and over to the Shawcroft. This function and ceremony has now moved to the Leisure Centre due to the closure of the Green Man in 2012. For 2014, it has been agreed with the new owner that the goal confirmation ceremony will return to the Green Man courtyard.
Shrovie
Slang for Shrovetide.
"Down wi' it"
Often shouted by many onlookers supporting the Up'ards or Down'ards, mainly women. To force the ball down in the centre of the "hug" thus slowing down the progress of the opposing team who are trying to throw the ball clear to their "runners" so they can make a "break" towards goal. This would typically happen when a team has won that day or the previous day and wish to force a draw in the game becoming overall winners that year.
Plinth
From where the ball is "turned up" (thrown) to start a game.

== The anthem ==
The anthem is sung at a pre-game ceremony in a local hotel. It was written in 1891 for a concert held to raise money to pay off the fines ordered for playing the game in the street.

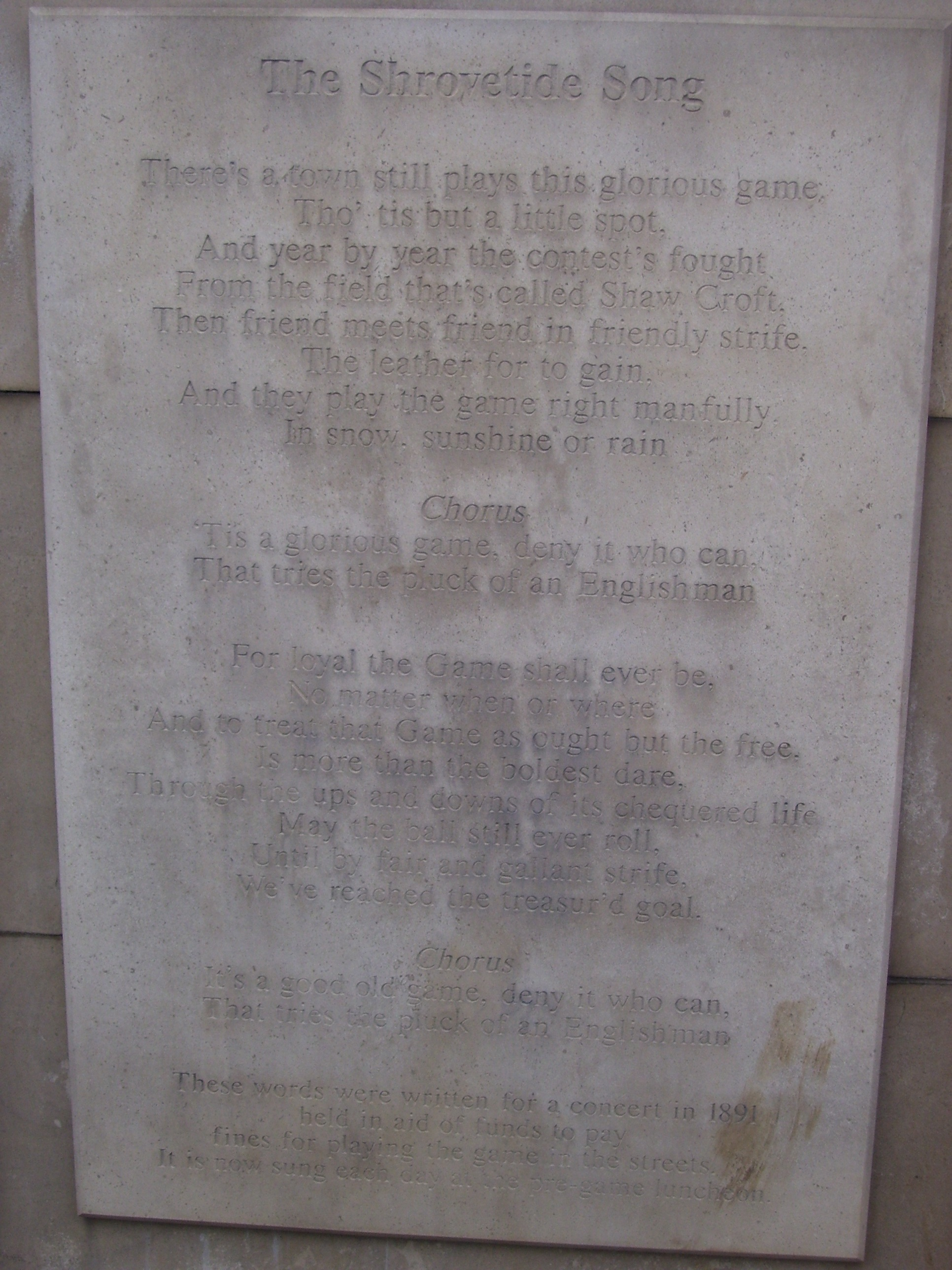
Original lyrics from 1891 mounted on the plinth.

There's a town still plays this glorious game
Tho' tis but a little spot.
And year by year the contest's fought
From the field that's called Shaw Croft.
Then friend meets friend in friendly strife
The leather for to gain,
And they play the game right manfully,
In snow, sunshine or rain.

Chorus

'Tis a glorious game, deny it who can
That tries the pluck of an Englishman.

For loyal the Game shall ever be
No matter when or where,
And treat that Game as ought but the free,
Is more than the boldest dare.
Though the ups and downs of its chequered life
May the ball still ever roll,
Until by fair and gallant strife
We've reached the treasur'd goal.

Chorus

'Tis a glorious game, deny it who can
That tries the pluck of an Englishman.

== Films and media ==
The event is often attended by reporters and documentary makers from several European countries, along with those from the United States and Japan. Appearances on UK television include Blue Peter, where the presenters experienced the game for themselves, and gameshow They Think It's All Over, where it was featured as the "Unusual Sport" and later in the show some local Down'Ards appeared on the "Feel the Sportsman" round.

The 2006 game was attended by a Los Angeles film company acquiring footage for a documentary titled Wild in the Streets, produced and co-directed by Peter Baxter and narrated by Sean Bean. The film premiered at the 2012 Slamdance Film Festival in Park City, Utah, USA. The film was released online and on-demand in the US in April 2013.

== See also ==
- Knattleikr, a Viking ball game.
- Caid, an early Irish ball game.
- Kirkwall Ba game
- La soule, a Norman ball game also played in Brittany and Cornwall.
- Medieval football in Europe.
- Haxey Hood, a similar game from Lincolnshire.
- Bottle-kicking, a similar game played in Leicestershire.
- Lelo burti, a similar game played in Georgia.
- Sedgefield Ball Game, a similar game played in County Durham
