= Tricot station =

Railway station in Tricot, France

Tricot
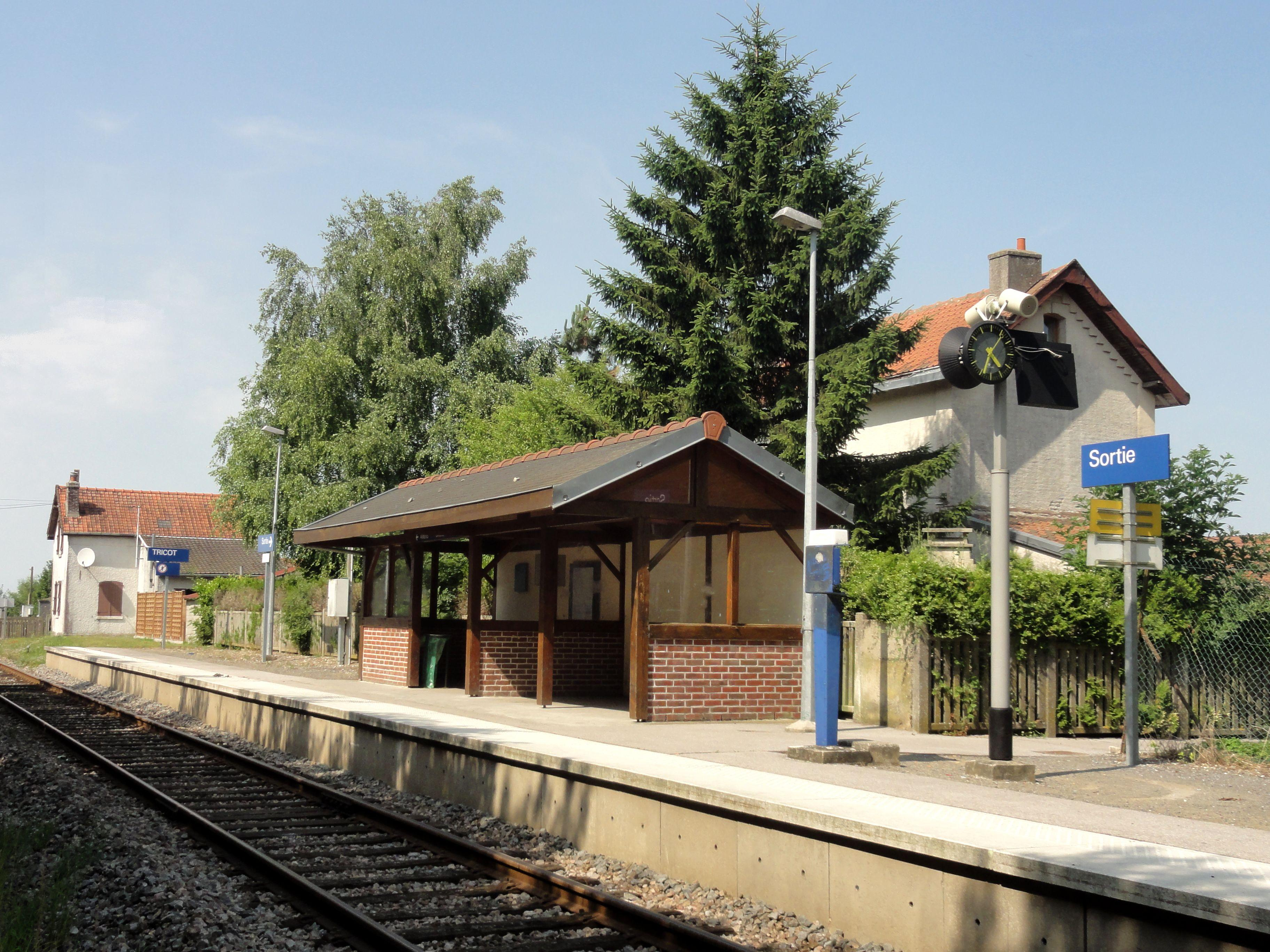

General information
- Location: Rue de la Gare; 60420 Tricot
- Coordinates: 49°33′45″N 2°34′53″E
- Owner: RFF/SNCF
- Line: Ormoy-Villiers–Boves railway

Other information
- Station code: 87313353

Services
Preceding station	TER Hauts-de-France	Following station
Montdidier towards Amiens	Proxi P23	Wacquemoulin towards Compiègne
Location

Tricot is a railway station located in the commune of Tricot in the Oise department, northern France. The station is situated at 105.293 km of the Ormoy-Villiers–Boves railway (km 0 is the Gare du Nord in Paris), between Estrées-Saint-Denis and Montdidier. Its elevation is 101 m above sea level. It is served by TER Hauts-de-France trains from Amiens to Compiègne.

== History ==
The Ormoy-Villiers–Boves railway, on which the station is situated, was an important freight line on which coal was transported from the mines in the North to Paris. This use has declined, part of the line has been abandoned, and the formerly double track railway was reduced to a single track in the 1980s.

An abandoned storage yard and the former junction (abandoned in the 1960s) to the sugar factory are reminders of the industrial past of Tricot (textiles and sugar).

== See also ==
- List of SNCF stations in Hauts-de-France
