= Sedgefield Ball Game =

Mob football game in England

The Sedgefield Ball Game is a mob football game played every Shrove Tuesday across the town of Sedgefield in County Durham, England.

According to tradition, the parish clerk is obliged to furnish a football on Shrove Tuesday, which he throws into the market place, where it is contested for by the mechanics against the agriculturists of the town and neighbourhood. More recently, however, it is a secret group of local residents who organise the game, provide the ball and choose who will start the game off. WHELLAN, F. (1894) History Topography, and Directory of the County Palatine of Durham. Second Edition. Great Britain: Hanson & Co.

== Gameplay ==
At 1.00 p.m, the game's leather ball is passed three times through a bull ring in the centre of the village. The object of the game used to be to "ally" the ball at two goals at either end of the village. However the ball can not be allied until 4.00 p.m.. due to the expansion of the village it now has only one "ally", which has been slightly moved from its original setting. The ally is a beck at the south of the village. Until 4pm the ball is played around the surrounding villages, and it is a great privilege to get even a kick, as it can get quite physical. The first person to get the ball to any of the local pubs by tradition receives a free drink.

Once the ball has been allied it must be returned to the bull ring in the centre of the village and passed through it three times. The whole task is quite difficult as this is an individual and not a team game.

== Winners ==
A plaque displaying winners can be found in The Golden Lion pub.

| Year | Winner |
|---|---|
| 2008 | Stephen Whitfield |
| 2009 | Michael Archer |
| 2010 | Lewis Archer |
| 2011 | J. Saunders Jnr |
| 2012 | Martin Lower |
| 2013 | Stephen Flockett |
| 2014 | Joe-Louis Fanelli |
| 2015 | James Archer |
| 2016 | Daz Clemmet |
| 2017 | Thomas Adcock |
| 2018 | Joe Saunders |
| 2019 | Michael Adcock |
| 2020 | Paul Johnson |
| 2022 | Adam Dovaston |
| 2023 | Daniel Archer |
| 2024 | Harrison Lower |
| 2025 | Rob Adcock |

The game was cancelled in 2021 due to the COVID-19 pandemic.

== See also ==
- Royal Shrovetide Football in the town of Ashbourne in Derbyshire, England.
- Scoring the Hales at Alnwick a small market town in north Northumberland, in the north-east of England.
- Cornish hurling at St Columb Major in Cornwall
