= Ménévillers =

- Commune
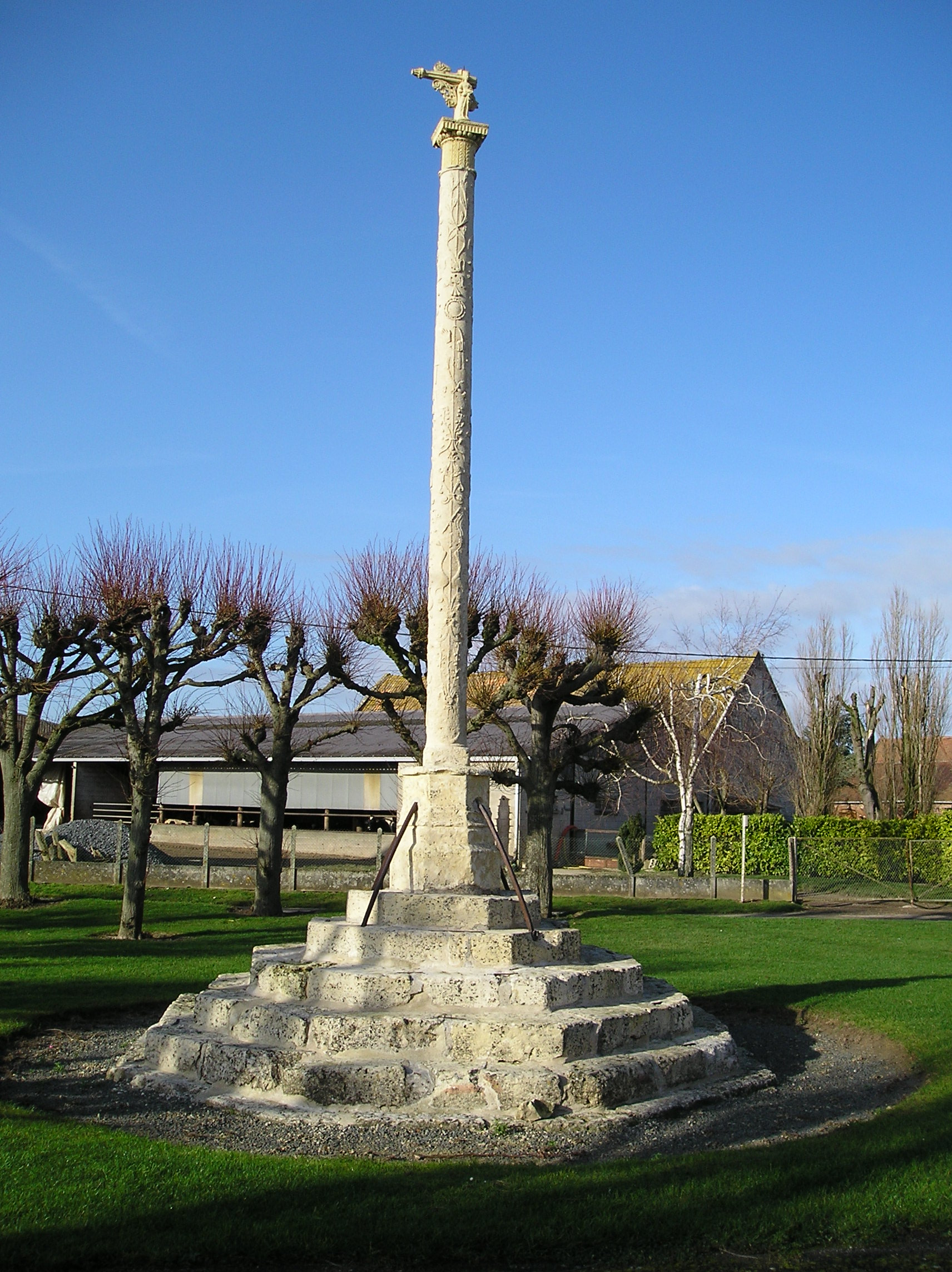
- The cross of Ménévillers
- Location of Ménévillers
- Location within France Location within Hauts-de-France
- Coordinates: 49°31′23″N 2°36′21″E
- Country: France
- Region: Hauts-de-France
- Department: Oise
- Arrondissement: Clermont
- Canton: Estrées-Saint-Denis
- Intercommunality: Plateau Picard

Government
  - Mayor (2020–2026): Cédric Poinsard
- Area^{1}: 4.88 km^{2} (1.88 sq mi)
- Elevation: 97 m (318 ft)
- Highest elevation: 108 m (354 ft)
- Lowest elevation: 79 m (259 ft)
- Population (2023): 103
  - Density: 21.1/km^{2} (54.7/sq mi)
- Time zone: UTC+01:00 (CET)
  - Summer (DST): UTC+02:00 (CEST)
- INSEE/Postal code: 60394 /60420
- ^{1} French Land Register data, which excludes lakes, ponds, glaciers > 1 km^{2} (0.386 sq mi or 247 acres) and river estuaries.

Ménévillers is a commune in the Oise department in northern France. As of 2023, the population of the commune was 103.

== Geography ==
Ménévillers covers an area of 4.88 square kilometres and lies at an elevation ranging from 79 to 108 metres above sea level.

== History ==
Ménévillers has historical roots dating back to the Gallo-Roman period, evidenced by archaeological findings, including a Roman road connecting Venette to Montdidier. During the Middle Ages, the Abbey of Saint-Martin-aux-Bois held lordship over the area and owned a fortified windmill destroyed in the Hundred Years' War and rebuilt in 1514.

== Landmarks ==
Notable landmarks in Ménévillers include:

=== Church of Saint-Léonard ===
The historic Church of Saint-Léonard contains baptismal fonts from the 16th century.

=== Stone Cross ===
Located in the church square, this Renaissance-era stone cross dates from the 16th century, measures approximately 6.5 metres high, and features intricate carvings depicting symbols of the Passion of Christ.

=== 17th-century Calvary ===
Situated in the local cemetery, this calvary dates back to approximately 1600. It comprises a small stone chapel topped by a crucifix.

== See also ==
- Communes of the Oise department
