= Saint-Martin-aux-Bois =

- Commune
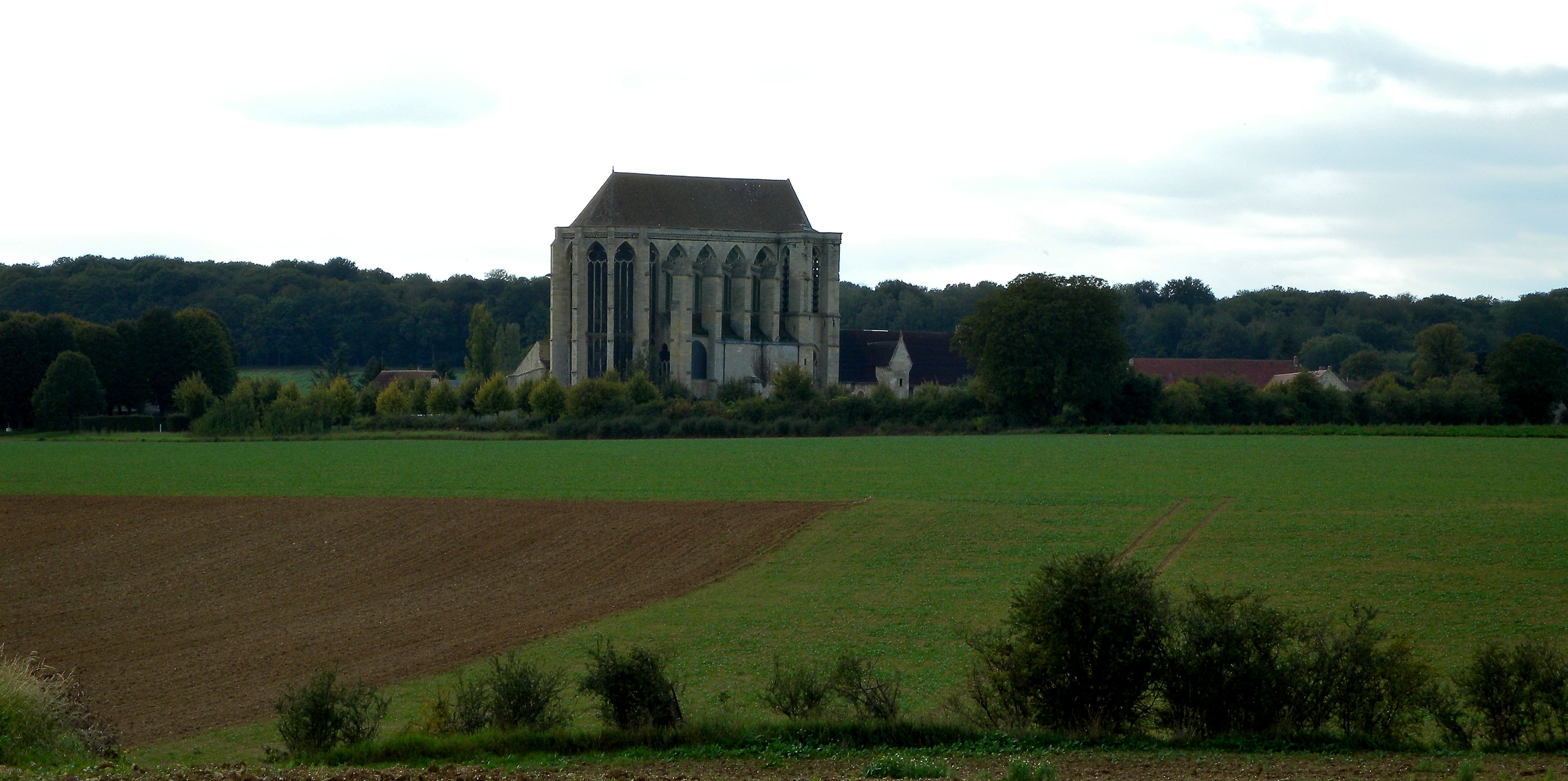
- The abbey in Saint-Martin-aux-Bois
- Location of Saint-Martin-aux-Bois
- Location within France Location within Hauts-de-France
- Coordinates: 49°31′18″N 2°34′19″E
- Country: France
- Region: Hauts-de-France
- Department: Oise
- Arrondissement: Clermont
- Canton: Estrées-Saint-Denis
- Intercommunality: Plateau Picard

Government
  - Mayor (2020–2026): Alain Lebrun
- Area^{1}: 9.31 km^{2} (3.59 sq mi)
- Elevation: 50 m (160 ft)
- Highest elevation: 134 m (440 ft)
- Lowest elevation: 69 m (226 ft)
- Population (2023): 263
  - Density: 28.2/km^{2} (73.2/sq mi)
- Time zone: UTC+01:00 (CET)
  - Summer (DST): UTC+02:00 (CEST)
- INSEE/Postal code: 60585 /60420
- ^{1} French Land Register data, which excludes lakes, ponds, glaciers > 1 km^{2} (0.386 sq mi or 247 acres) and river estuaries.

Saint-Martin-aux-Bois is a commune in the Oise department in northern France. It is known for its large church belonging to the former Abbey of Saint-Martin-aux-Bois, which was founded around 1080. Historically, the village was known as Ruricourt.

== See also ==
- Communes of the Oise department
