= Wacquemoulin =

- Commune
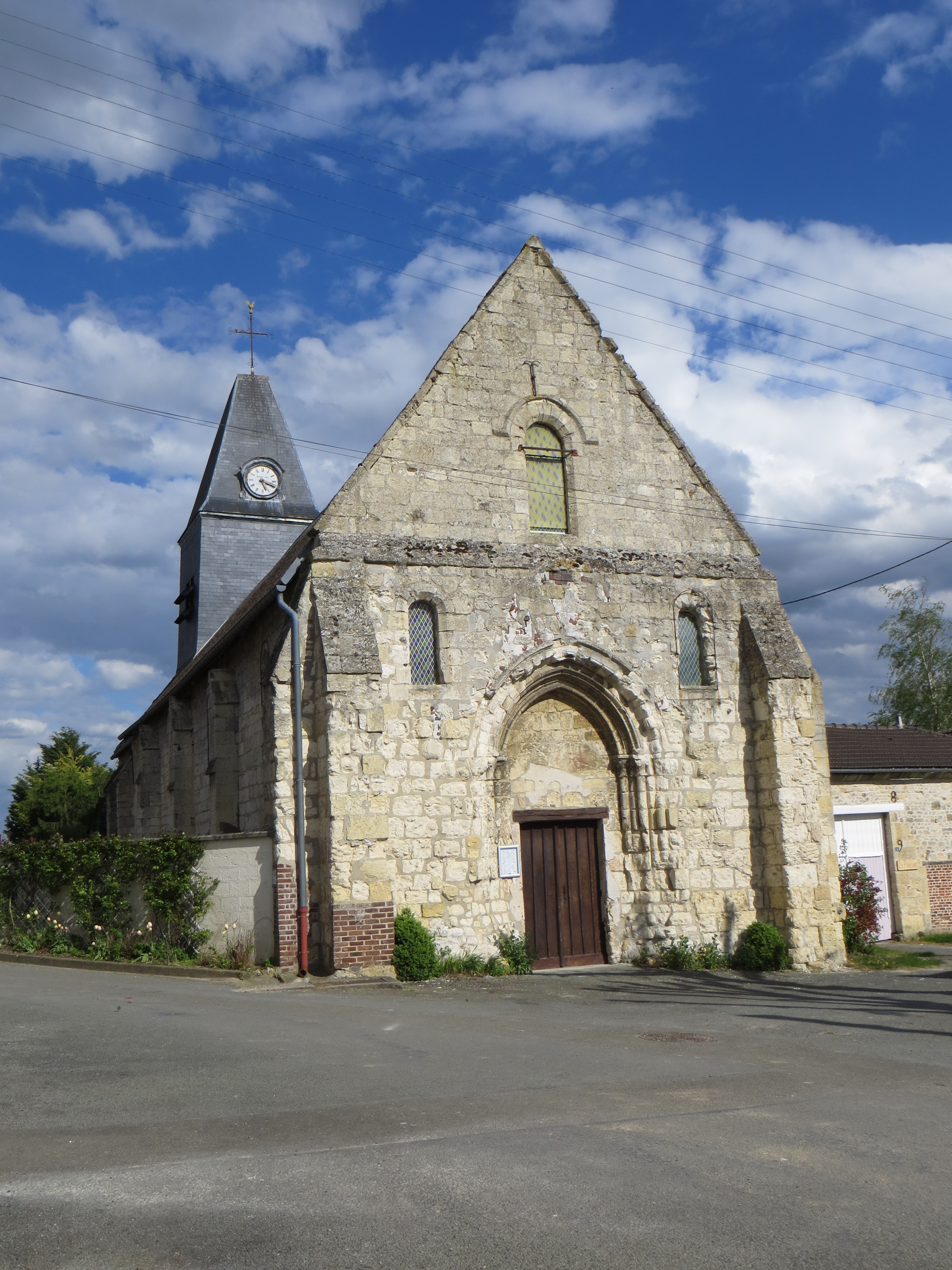
- The church in Wacquemoulin
- Location of Wacquemoulin
- Location within France Location within Hauts-de-France
- Coordinates: 49°30′12″N 2°37′03″E
- Country: France
- Region: Hauts-de-France
- Department: Oise
- Arrondissement: Clermont
- Canton: Estrées-Saint-Denis
- Intercommunality: Plateau Picard

Government
  - Mayor (2020–2026): Éric Valois
- Area^{1}: 6.66 km^{2} (2.57 sq mi)
- Elevation: 100 m (330 ft)
- Highest elevation: 102 m (335 ft)
- Lowest elevation: 57 m (187 ft)
- Population (2023): 283
  - Density: 42.5/km^{2} (110/sq mi)
- Time zone: UTC+01:00 (CET)
  - Summer (DST): UTC+02:00 (CEST)
- INSEE/Postal code: 60698 /60420
- ^{1} French Land Register data, which excludes lakes, ponds, glaciers > 1 km^{2} (0.386 sq mi or 247 acres) and river estuaries.

Wacquemoulin (French pronunciation: [vakmulɛ̃]) is a commune in the Oise department in northern France, located 20 km north west of Compiegne. Wacquemoulin station has rail connections to Amiens and Compiègne.

== Population ==
Historical population
Year	Pop.	±% p.a.
1968	244	—
1975	187	−3.73%
1982	190	+0.23%
1990	306	+6.14%
1999	312	+0.22%
2007	289	−0.95%
2012	299	+0.68%
2017	300	+0.07%
2023	283	−0.97%
Source: INSEE

== See also ==
- Communes of the Oise department
