= Tricot, Oise =

Tricot
- Commune
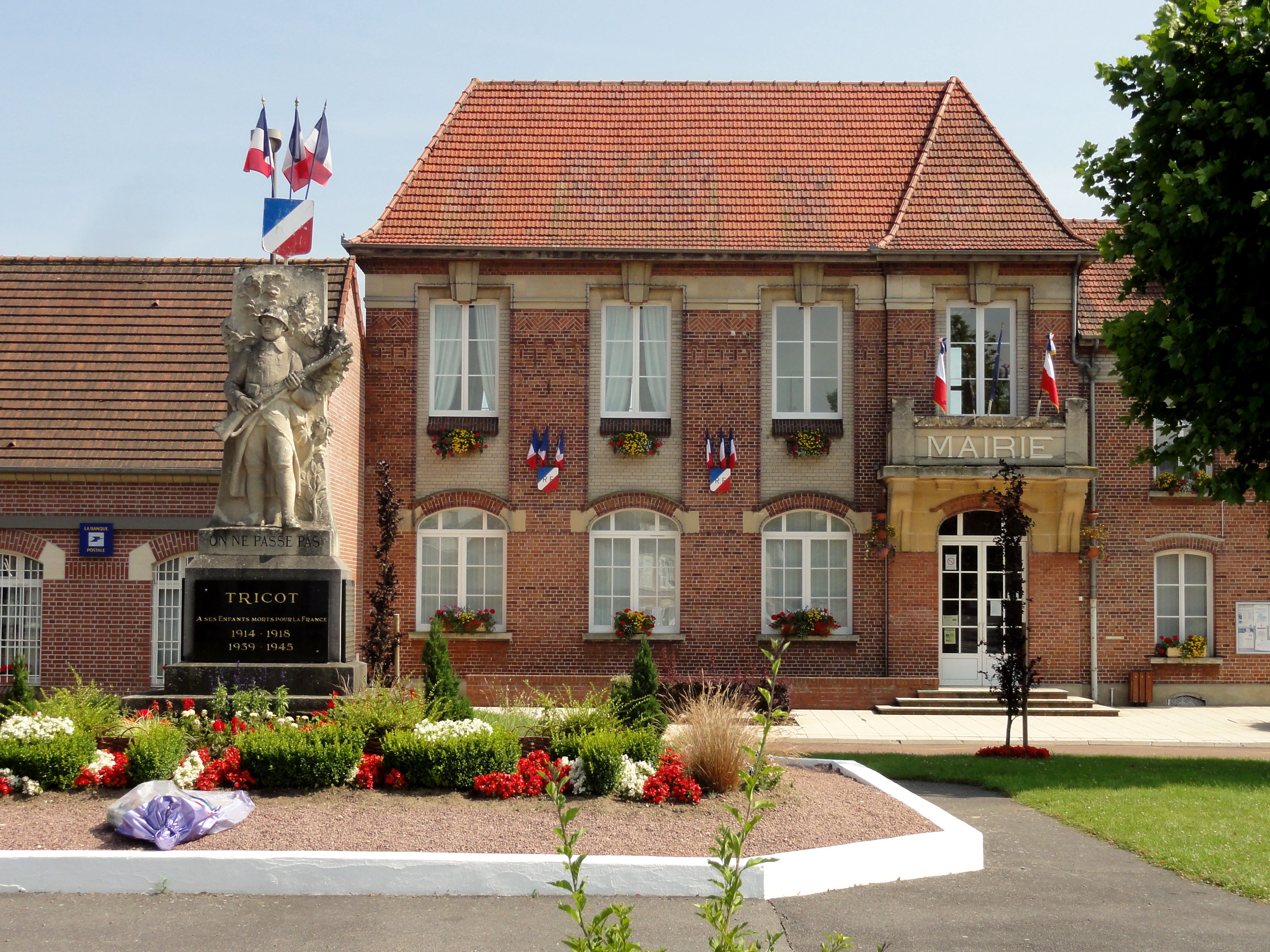
- The town hall in Tricot

- Coat of arms
- Location of Tricot
- Location within France Location within Hauts-de-France
- Coordinates: 49°33′42″N 2°35′23″E
- Country: France
- Region: Hauts-de-France
- Department: Oise
- Arrondissement: Clermont
- Canton: Estrées-Saint-Denis
- Intercommunality: Plateau Picard

Government
  - Mayor (2020–2026): Francis Soetaert
- Area^{1}: 11.91 km^{2} (4.60 sq mi)
- Elevation: 98 m (322 ft)
- Highest elevation: 132 m (433 ft)
- Lowest elevation: 89 m (292 ft)
- Population (2023): 1,392
  - Density: 116.9/km^{2} (302.7/sq mi)
- Time zone: UTC+01:00 (CET)
  - Summer (DST): UTC+02:00 (CEST)
- INSEE/Postal code: 60643 /60420
- ^{1} French Land Register data, which excludes lakes, ponds, glaciers > 1 km^{2} (0.386 sq mi or 247 acres) and river estuaries.

Tricot (French pronunciation: [tʁiko]) is a commune in the Oise department in northern France. Tricot station has rail connections to Amiens and Compiègne.

== See also ==
- Communes of the Oise department
