= Football =

Group of related team sports

Several codes of football

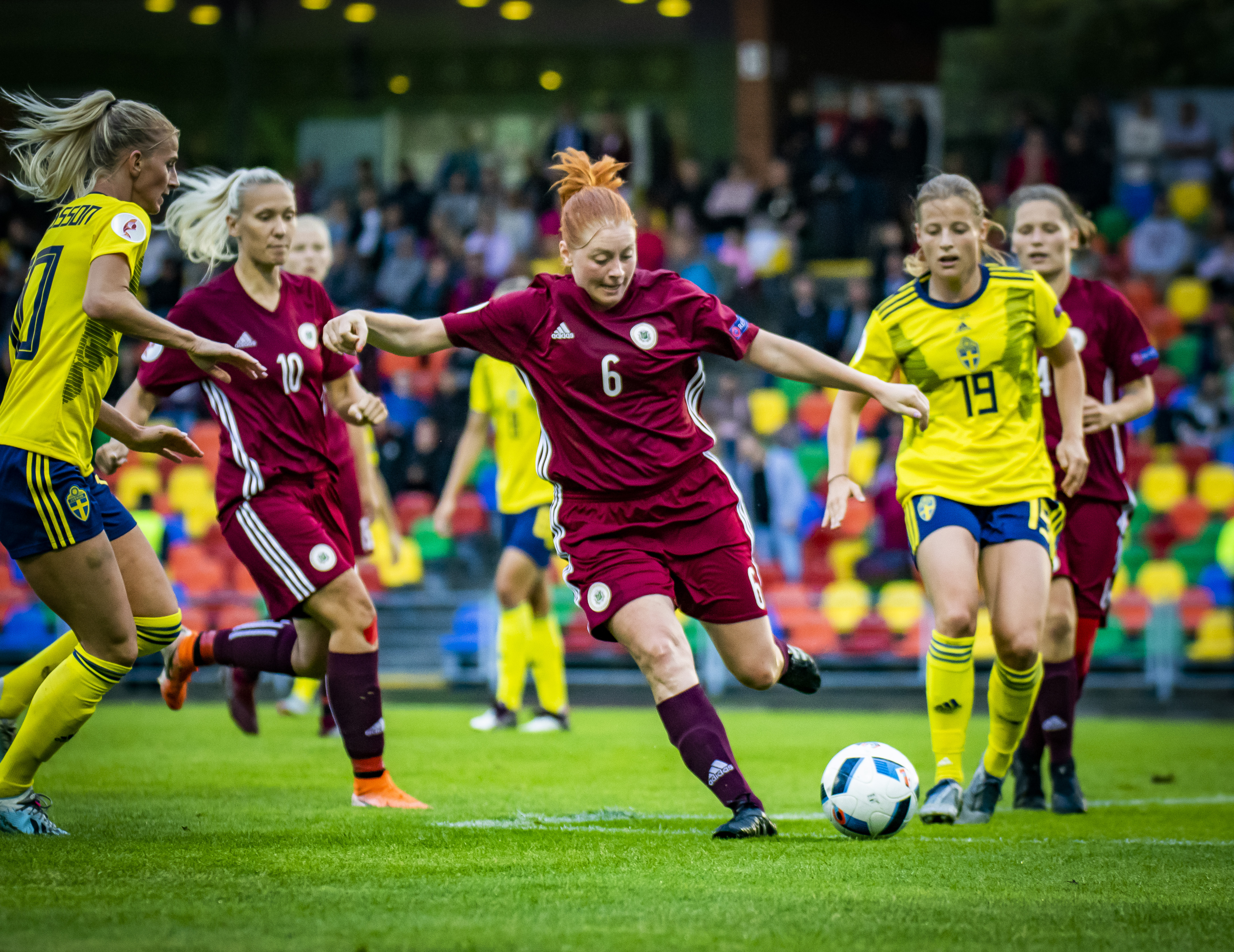
Association football (soccer)

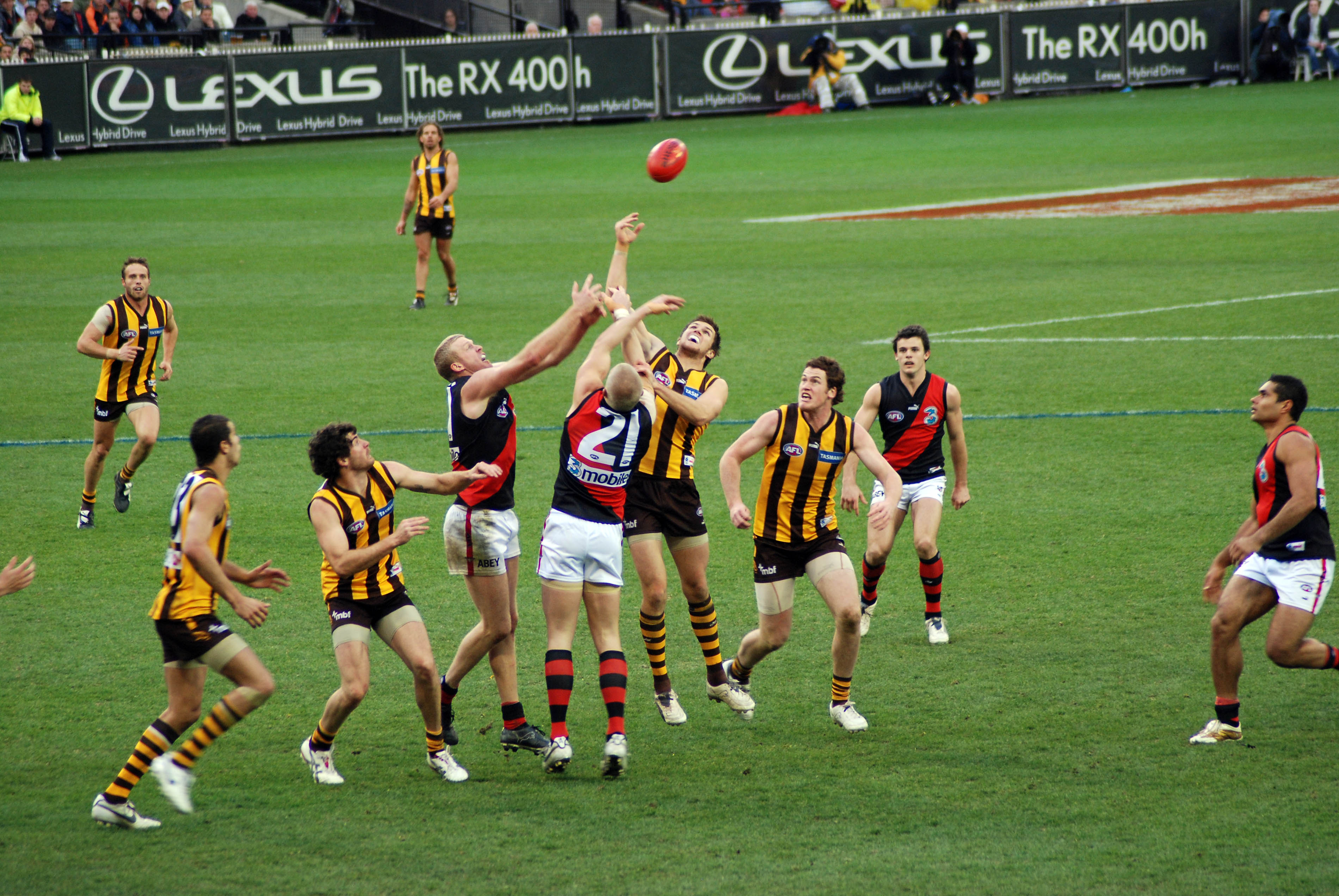
Australian rules

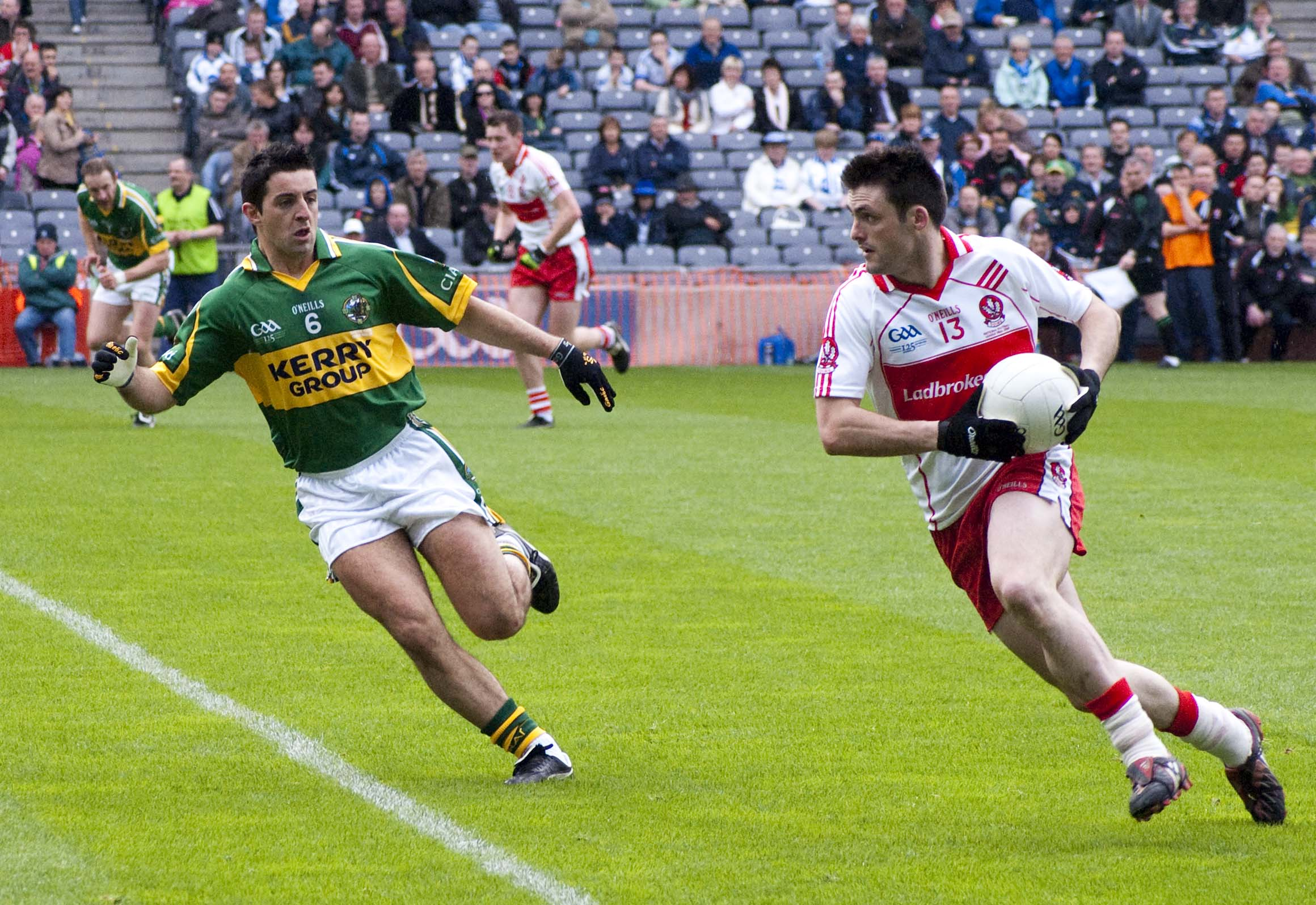
Gaelic (GAA)

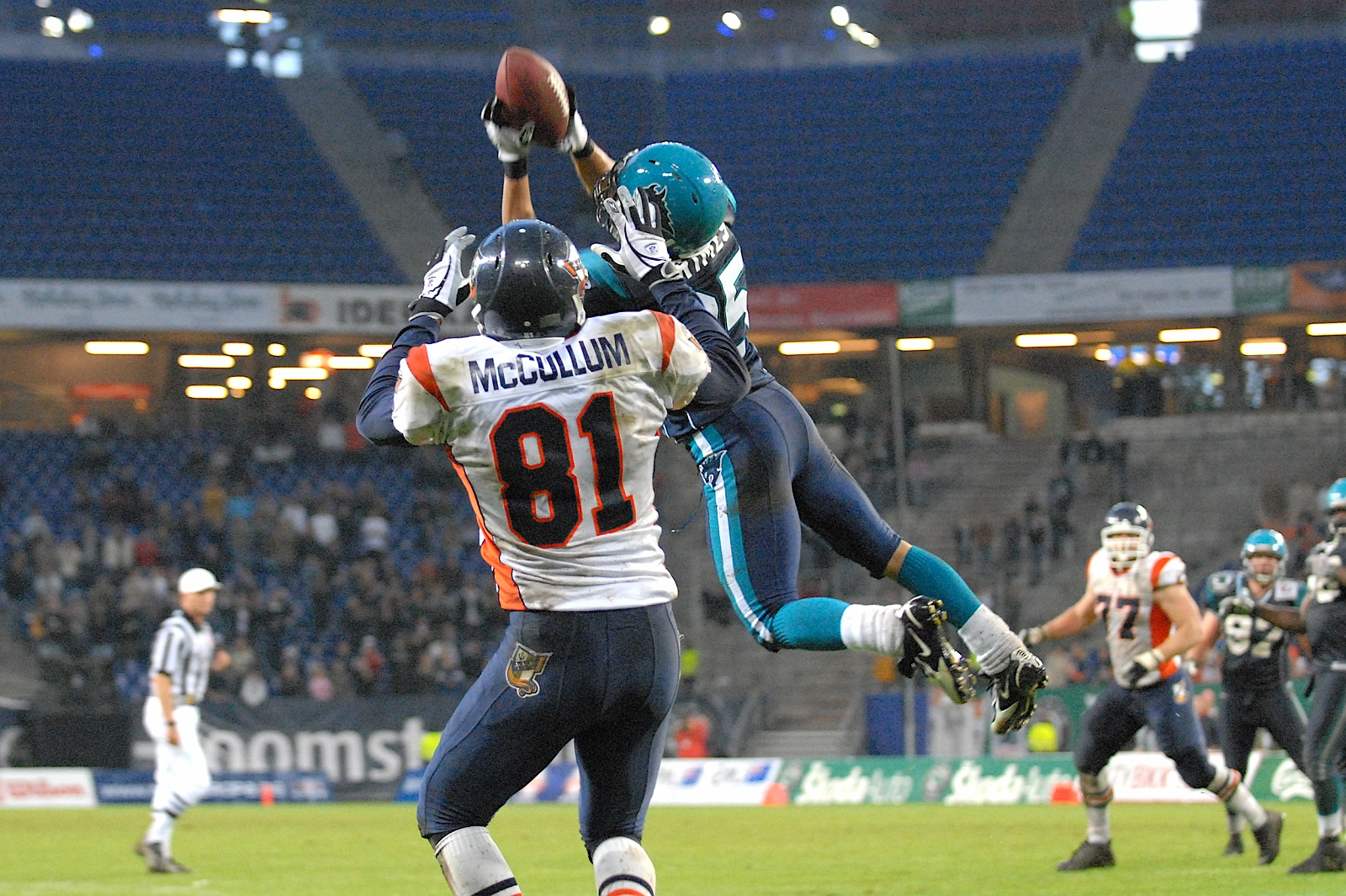
Gridiron (American / Canadian)

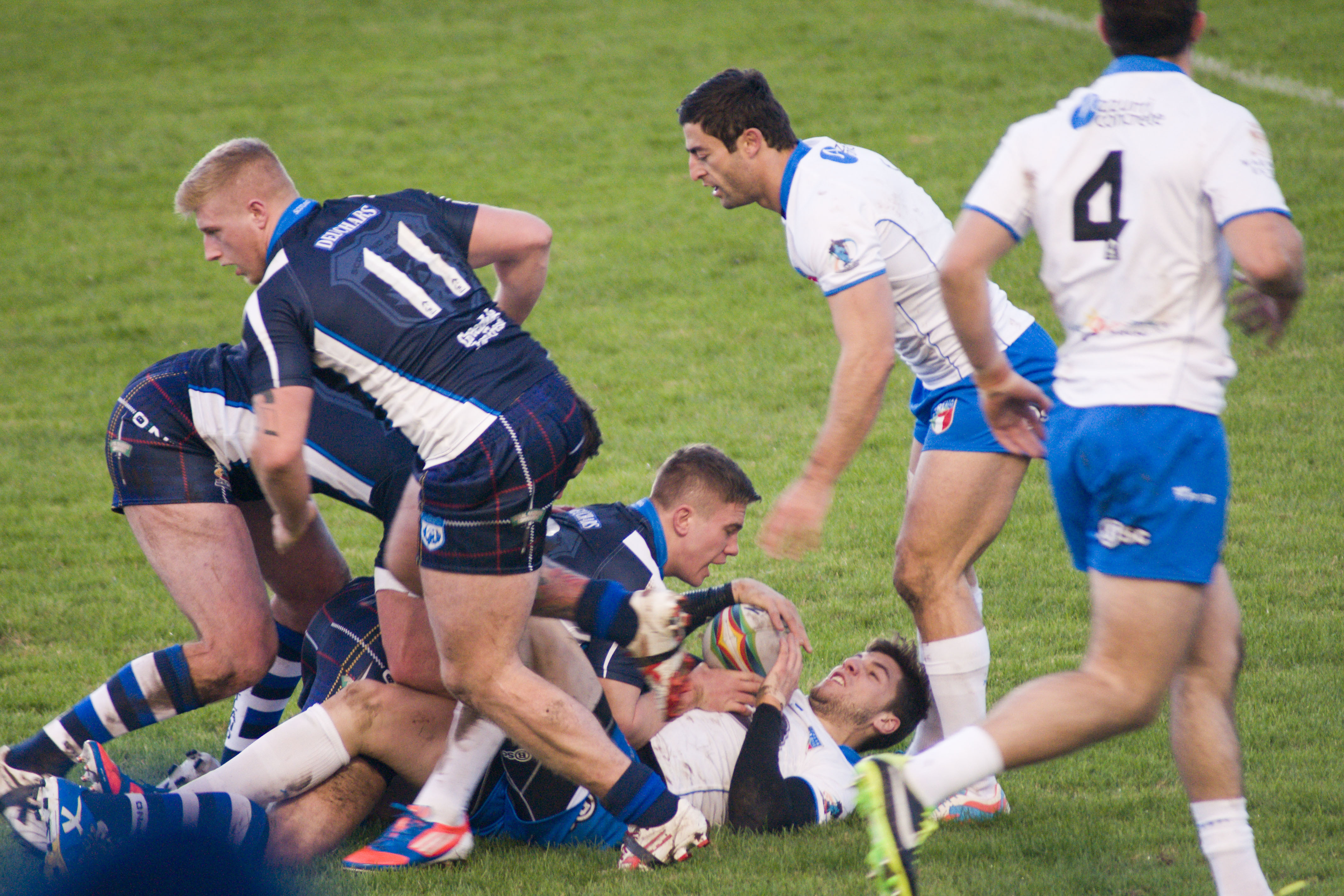
Rugby league

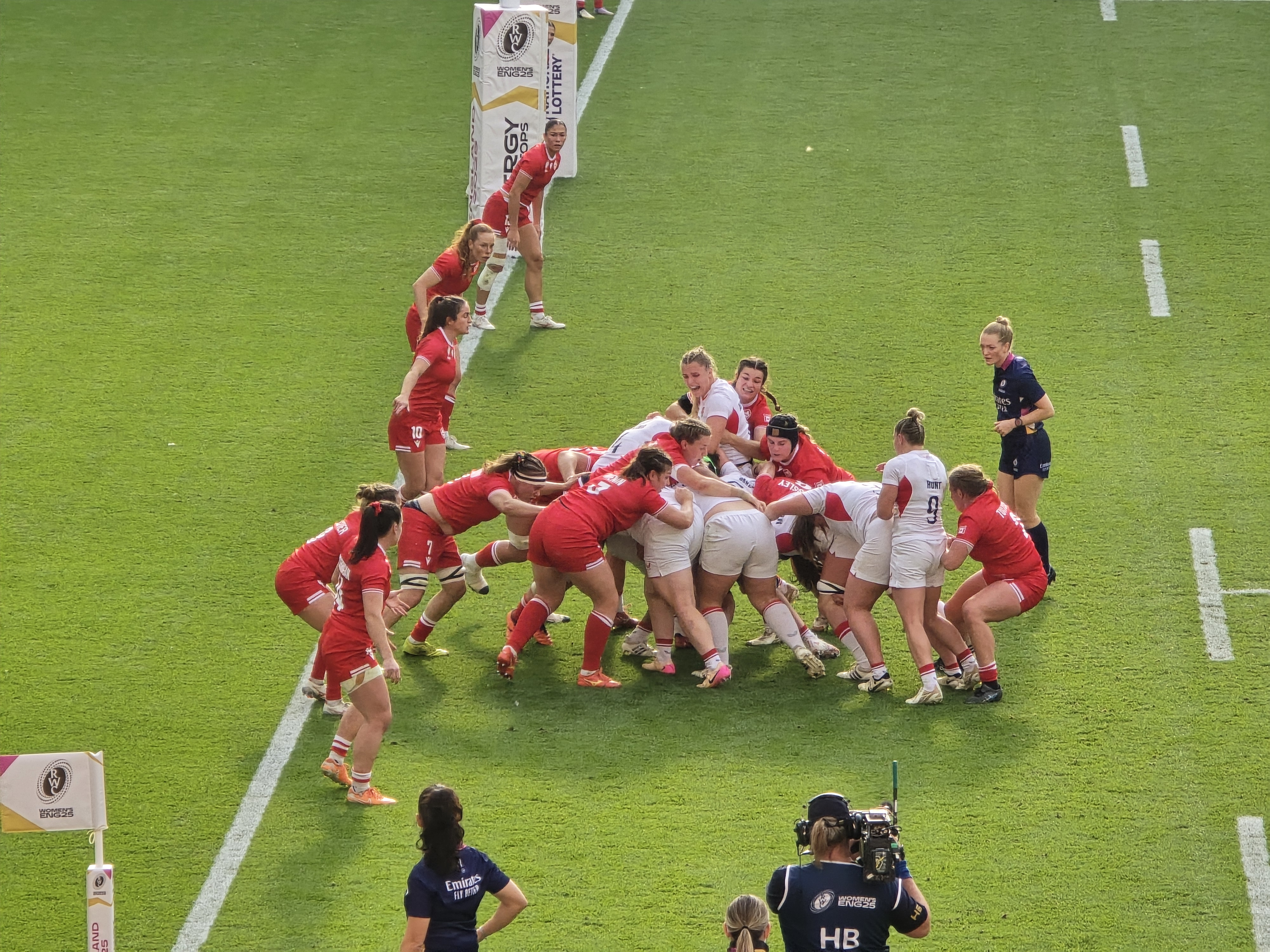
Rugby union

Football is a family of team sports in which the object is to get the ball over a goal line, into a goal, or between goalposts using merely the body (by carrying, throwing, or kicking).

Unqualified, the word football generally means the form of football that is the most popular where the word is used. Sports commonly called football include association football (known as soccer in Australia, Canada, South Africa, the United States, and sometimes in Ireland and New Zealand); Australian rules football; Gaelic football; gridiron football (specifically American football, arena football, or Canadian football); International rules football; rugby league football; and rugby union football. These various forms of football share, to varying degrees, common origins and are known as "football codes".

There are a number of references to traditional, ancient, or prehistoric ball games played in many different parts of the world. Contemporary codes of football can be traced back to the codification of these games at English public schools during the 19th century, itself an outgrowth of medieval football. The expansion and cultural power of the British Empire allowed these rules of football to spread to areas of British influence outside the directly controlled empire. By the end of the 19th century, distinct regional codes were already developing: Gaelic football, for example, deliberately incorporated the rules of local traditional football games to maintain their heritage. The FA allowed professionalism in English association football in 1885. Three years later twelve English clubs got together and set up the Football League, which introduced a regular league competition that gave professional clubs scheduled fixtures. During the 20th century, several of the various kinds of football grew to become some of the most popular team sports in the world.

== Common elements ==
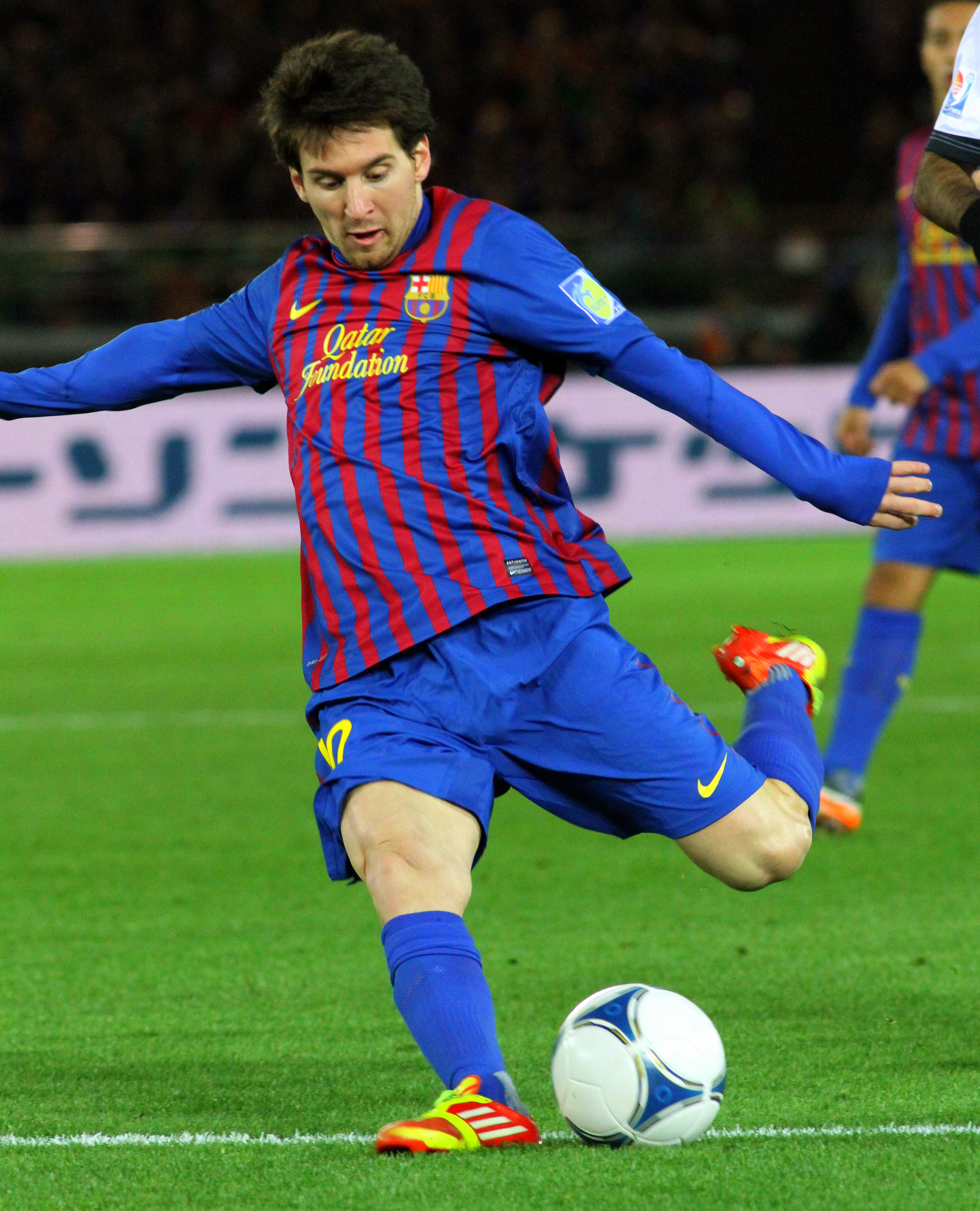
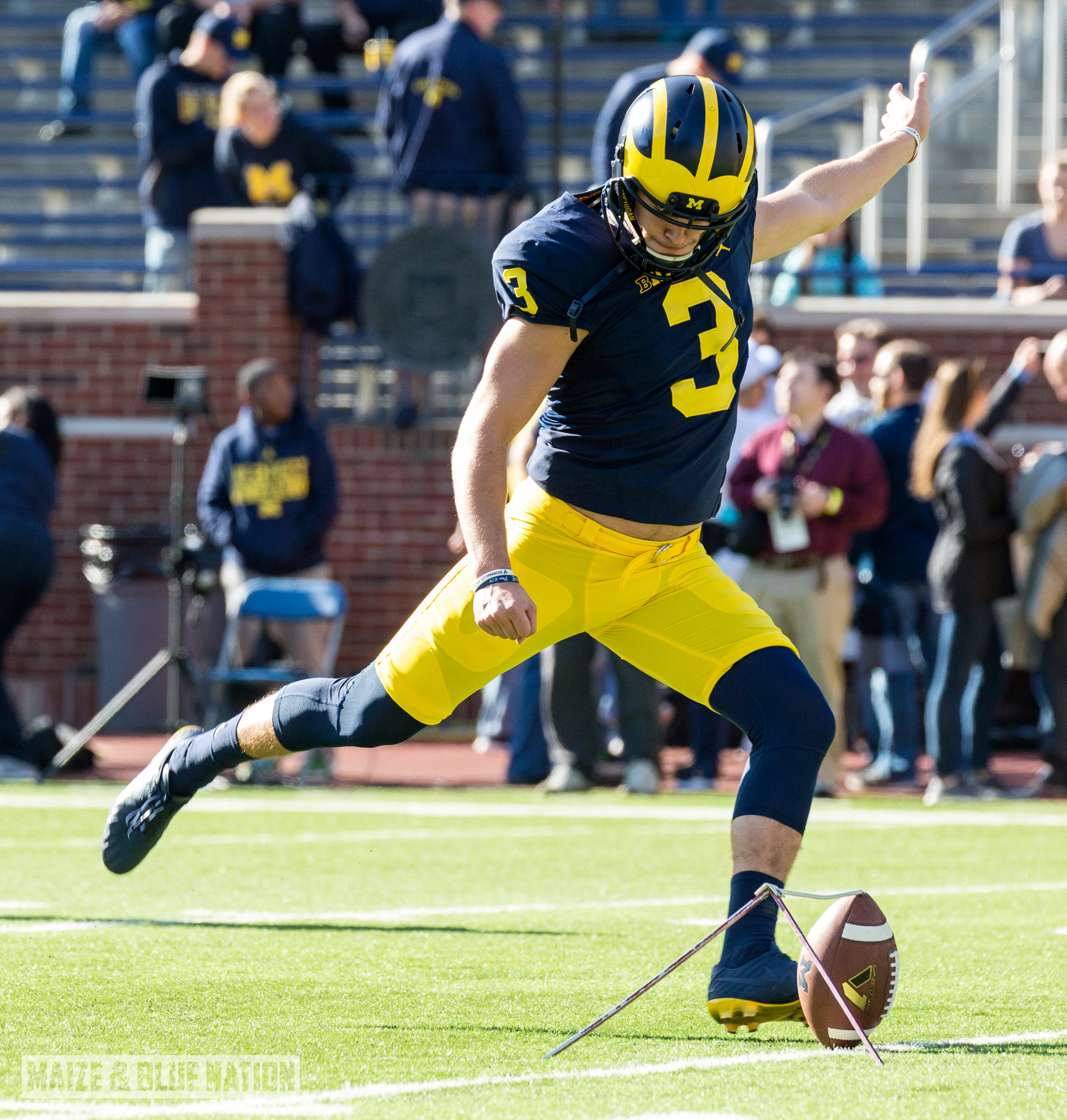
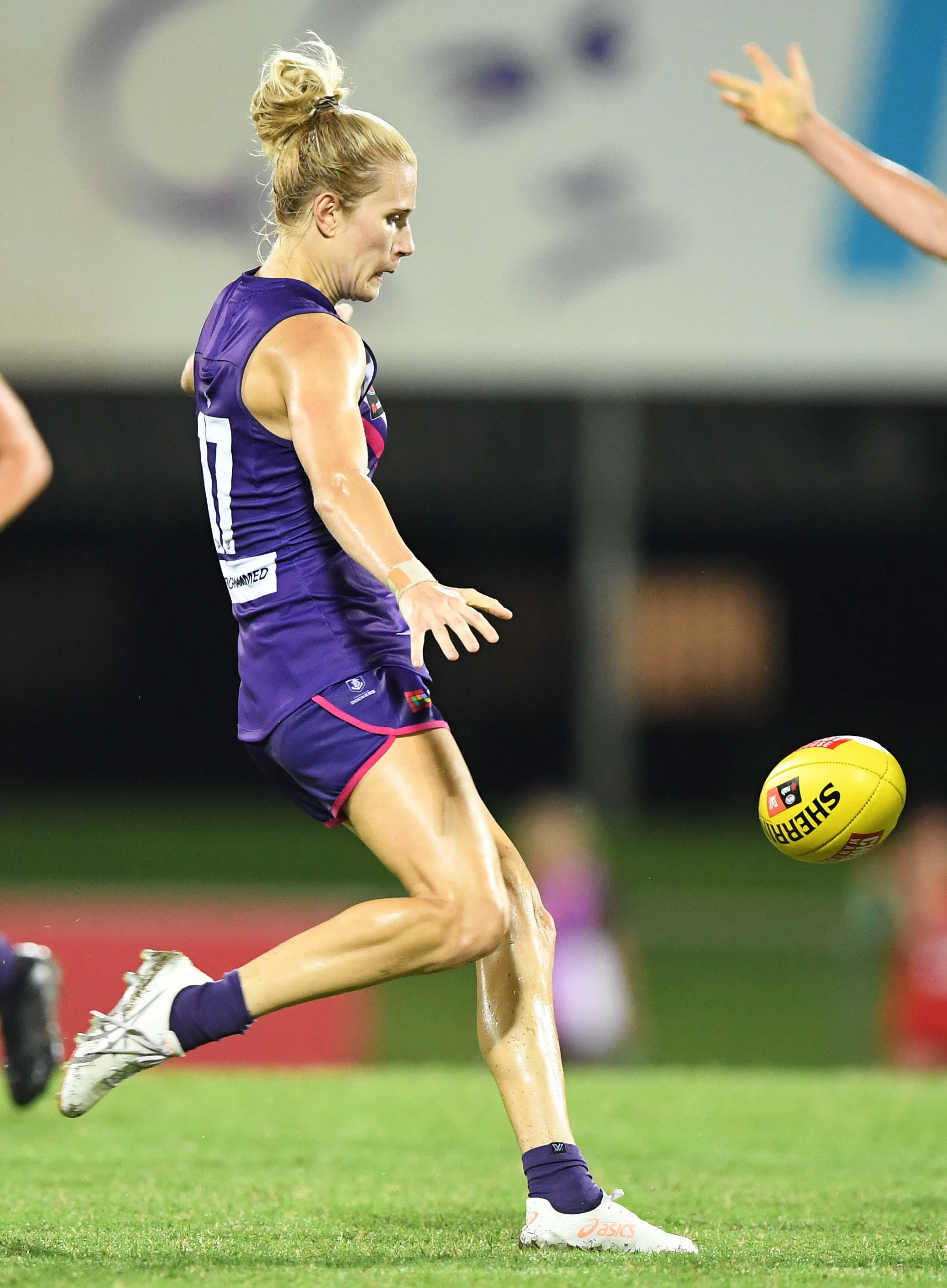
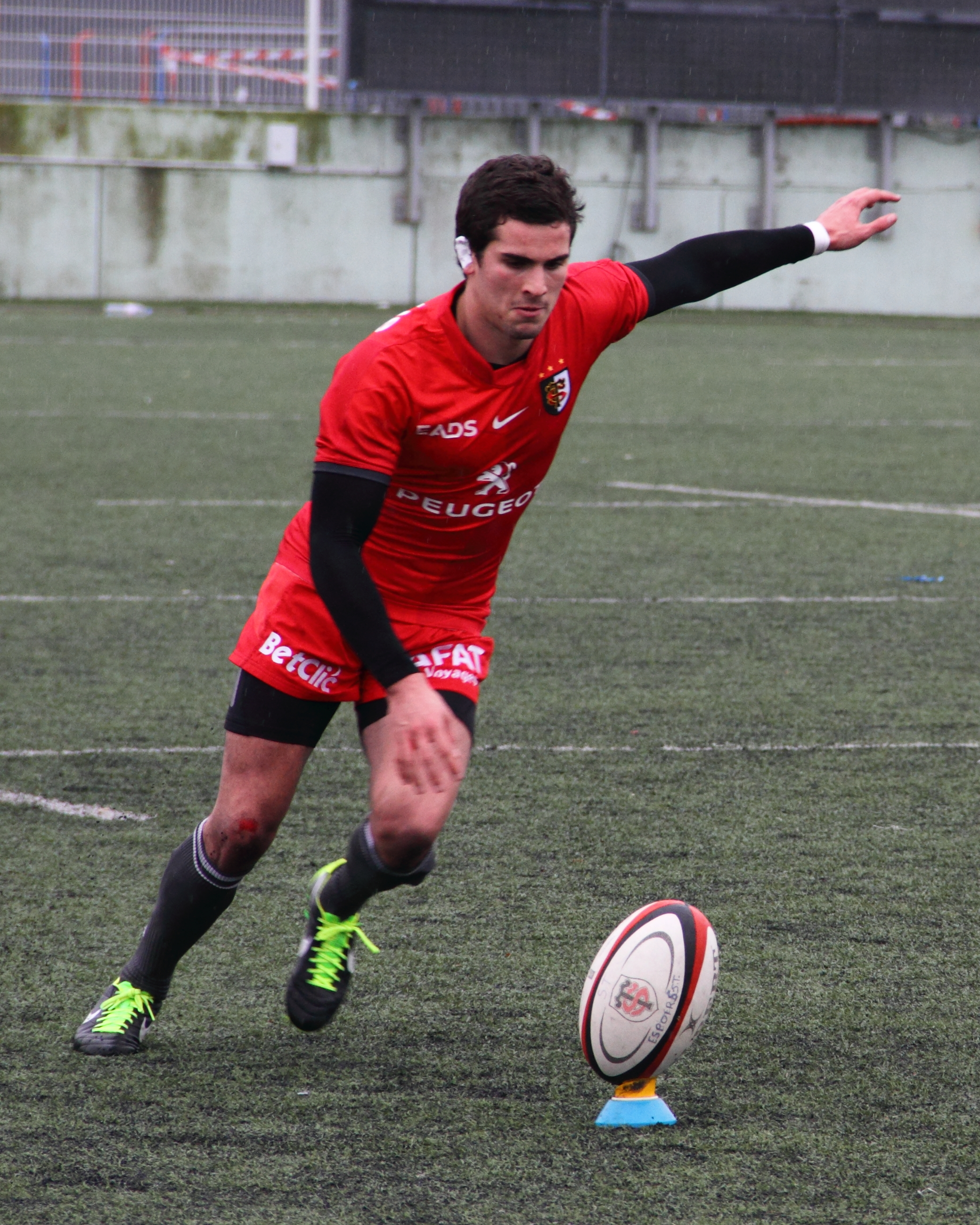
The action of kicking in (clockwise from upper left) association, gridiron, rugby, and Australian football

The various codes of football share certain common elements and can be grouped into two main classes of football: carrying codes like American football, Canadian football, Australian football, rugby union and rugby league, where the ball is moved about the field while being held in the hands or passed by hand, and kicking codes such as association football and Gaelic football, where the ball is moved primarily with the feet, and where handling is strictly limited. Common rules among the sports include:

- Two teams usually have between 11 and 18 players; some variations that have fewer players (five or more per team) are also popular.
- A clearly defined area in which to play the game.
- Scoring goals or points by moving the ball to an opposing team's end of the field and either into a goal area, or over a line.
- Goals or points resulting from players putting the ball between two goalposts.
- The goal or line being defended by the opposing team.
- Players using only their body to move the ball, i.e. no additional equipment such as bats or sticks.
- An inflatable ball.

In all codes, common skills include passing, tackling, evasion of tackles, catching and kicking. In most codes, there are rules restricting the movement of players offside, and players scoring a goal must put the ball either under or over a crossbar between the goalposts.

== Etymology ==
The name "football" derives from the ball used in the game, which was apparently so named because it was moved with the feet. An alternative explanation holds that the game was named "football" because it was played on foot, not on horseback.

== Early history ==
=== Ancient games ===
==== Ancient China ====
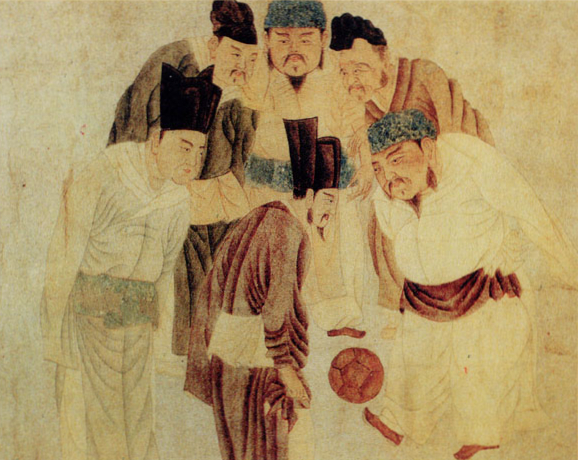
Emperor Taizu of Song playing cuju (Chinese football) with his prime minister Zhao Pu (趙普) and other ministers, by Yuan dynasty artist Qian Xuan (1235–1305)

The Chinese competitive game cuju (蹴鞠) is an early type of ball game where feet were used, in some aspects resembling modern association football. It was possibly played around the Han dynasty and early Qin dynasty, based on an attestation in a military manual from around the second to third centuries BC. In one version, gameplay consisted of players passing the ball between teammates without allowing it to touch the ground (much like keepie uppie). In its competitive version, two teams had to pass the ball without it falling, before kicking the ball through a circular hole placed in the middle of the pitch. Unlike association football, the two teams did not interact with each other but instead stayed on opposite sides of the pitch. Cuju has been cited by FIFA as the earliest form of football. The Japanese version of cuju is kemari (蹴鞠), and was developed during the Asuka period. This is known to have been played within the Japanese imperial court in Kyoto from about 600 AD. In kemari, several people stand in a circle and kick a ball to each other, trying not to let the ball drop to the ground. The Silk Road facilitated the transmission of cuju, especially the game popular in the Tang dynasty, the period when the inflatable ball was invented and replaced the stuffed ball.

==== Ancient Greece and Rome ====
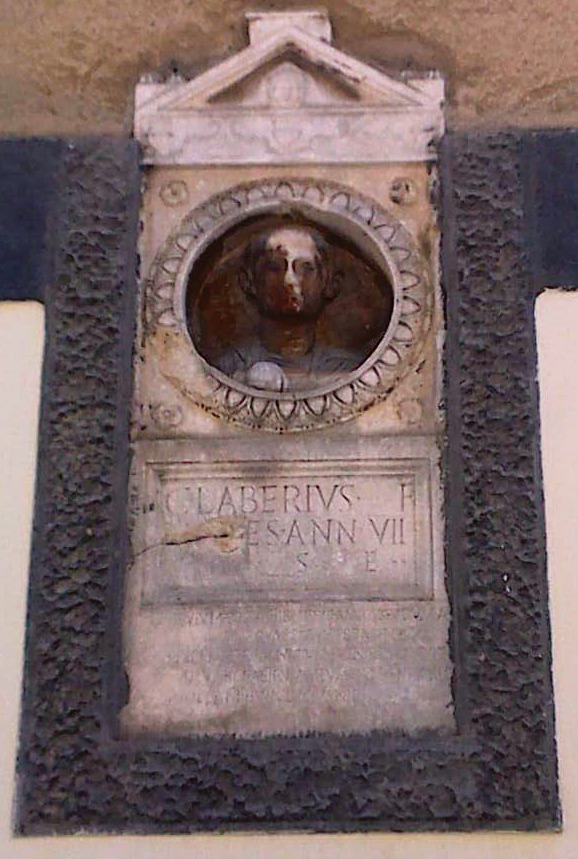
An ancient Roman tombstone of a boy with a Harpastum ball from Tilurium (modern Sinj, Croatia)

The Ancient Greeks and Romans are known to have played many ball games, some of which involved the use of the feet. The Roman game harpastum is believed to have been adapted from a Greek team game known as ἐπίσκυρος (episkyros) or φαινίνδα (phaininda), which is mentioned by a Greek playwright, Antiphanes (388–311 BC) and later referred to by the Christian theologian Clement of Alexandria (c. 150 – c. 215 AD). These games appear to have resembled rugby football. The Roman politician Cicero (106–43 BC) describes the case of a man who was killed whilst having a shave when a ball was kicked into a barber's shop. Roman ball games already knew the air-filled ball, the follis. Episkyros is described as an early form of football by FIFA.

==== The Americas ====
There are a number of references to traditional, ancient, or prehistoric ball games, played by indigenous peoples in many different parts of the world. For example, in 1586, men from a ship commanded by an English explorer named John Davis went ashore to play a form of football with Inuit in Greenland. There are later accounts of an Inuit game played on ice, called aqsaqtuk. Each match began with two teams facing each other in parallel lines, before attempting to kick the ball through each other team's line and then at a goal. In 1610, William Strachey, a colonist at Jamestown, Virginia, recorded a game played by Lenape people, called pahsaheman. Pasuckuakohowog, a game similar to modern-day association football played amongst Amerindians, was also reported as early as the 17th century. Games played in Mesoamerica with rubber balls by indigenous peoples are also well-documented as existing since before this time, but these had more similarities to basketball or volleyball, and no links have been found between such games and modern football sports. Indigenous people near the Great Lakes and the St Lawrence River, especially the Haudenosaunee Confederacy, played a game which made use of net racquets to throw and catch a small ball; however, although it is a ball-goal foot game, lacrosse and other forms of indigenous North American stickball are likewise not usually classed as a form of "football".

==== Oceania ====
On the Australian continent several tribes of indigenous people played kicking and catching games with stuffed balls which have been generalised by historians as Marn Grook (Djab Wurrung for "game ball"). The earliest historical account is an anecdote from the 1878 book by Robert Brough-Smyth, The Aborigines of Victoria, in which a man called Richard Thomas is quoted as saying, in about 1841 in Victoria, Australia, that he had witnessed Aboriginal people playing the game: "Mr Thomas describes how the foremost player will drop kick a ball made from the skin of a possum and how other players leap into the air to catch it." Some historians have theorised that Marn Grook was one of the origins of Australian rules football. The Māori in New Zealand played a game called Kī-o-rahi consisting of teams of seven players play on a circular field divided into zones, and score points by touching the 'pou' (boundary markers) and hitting a central 'tupu' or target. These games and others may well go far back into antiquity. However, the main sources of modern football codes appear to lie in western Europe, especially England.

==== Turkic peoples ====
Mahmud al-Kashgari in his Dīwān Lughāt al-Turk, described a game called tepuk among Turks in Central Asia. In the game, people try to attack each other's castle by kicking a ball made of sheep leather.

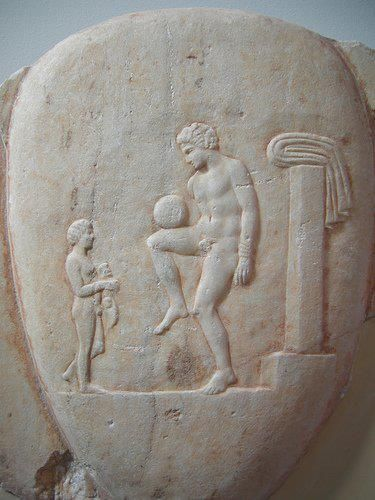
Ancient Greek athlete balancing a ball on his thigh, Piraeus, 400–375 BC

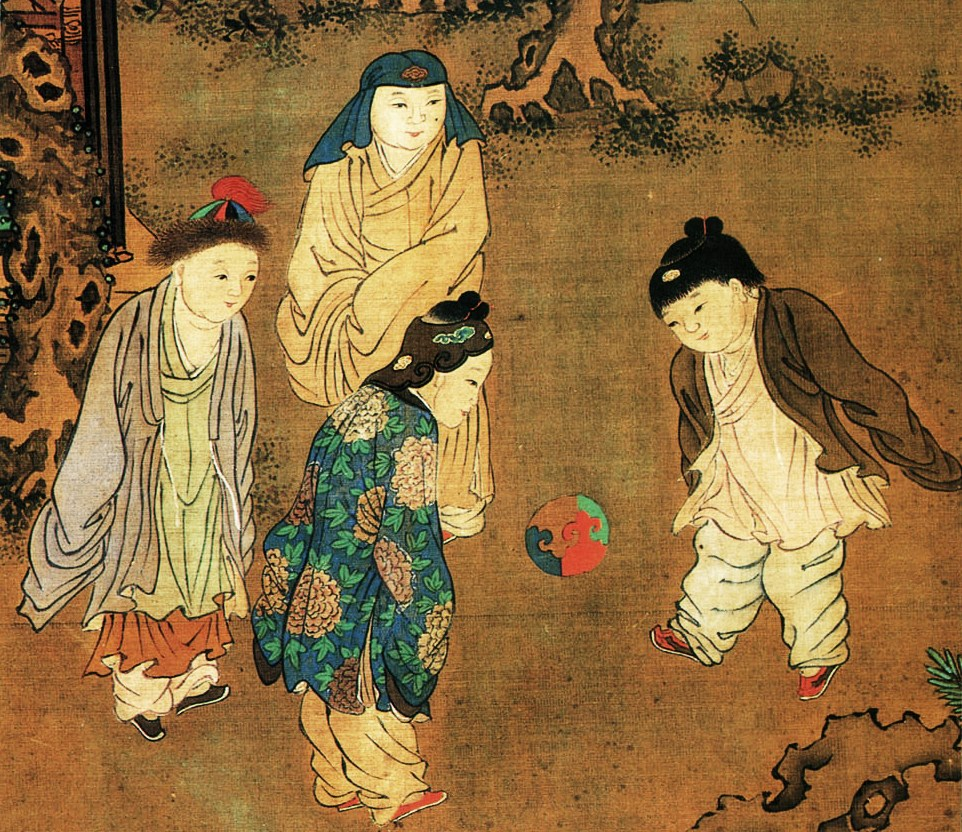
A Song dynasty painting by Su Hanchen (c. 1130–1160), depicting Chinese children playing cuju

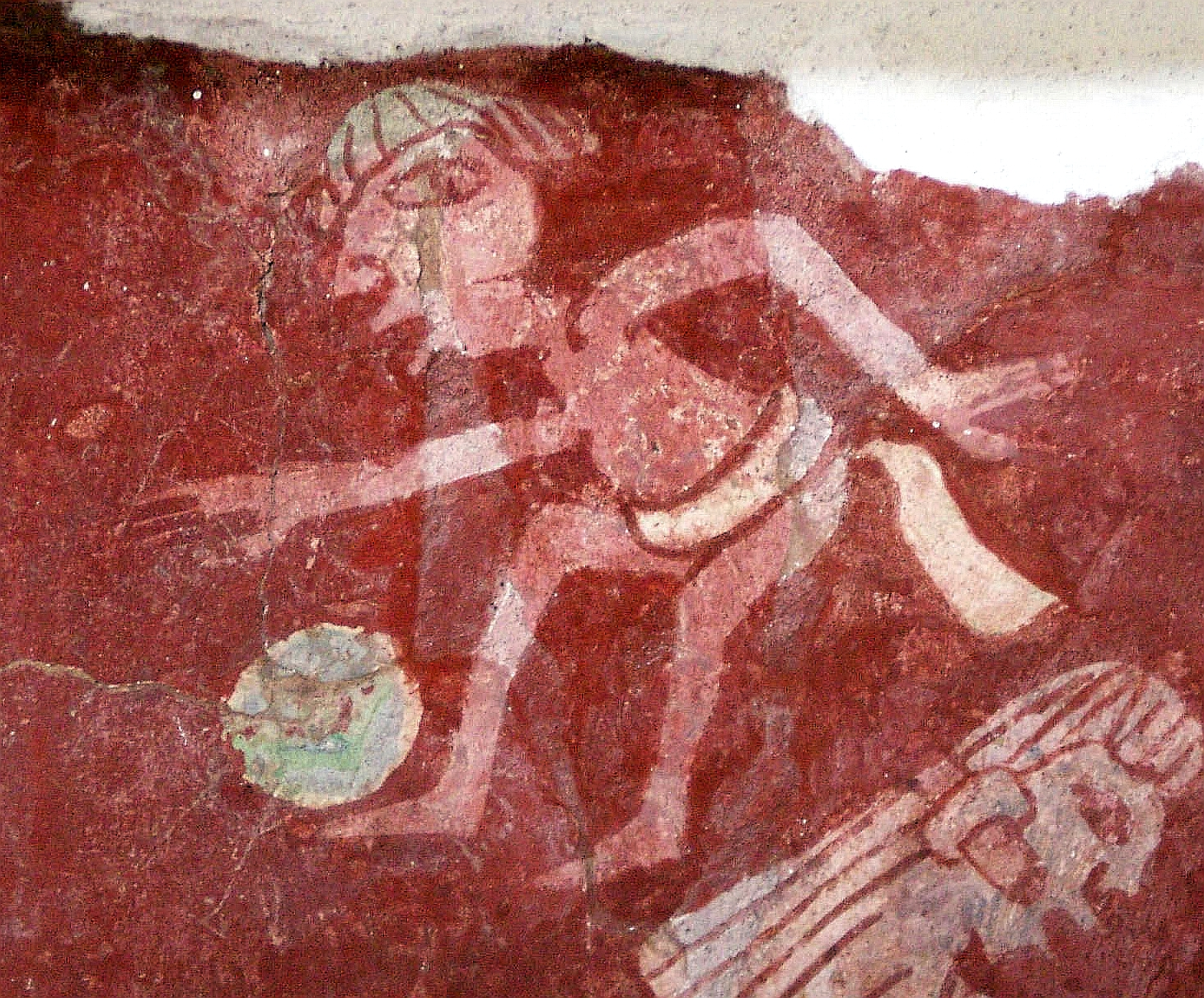
Paint of a Mesoamerican ballgame player of the Tepantitla murals in Teotihuacan

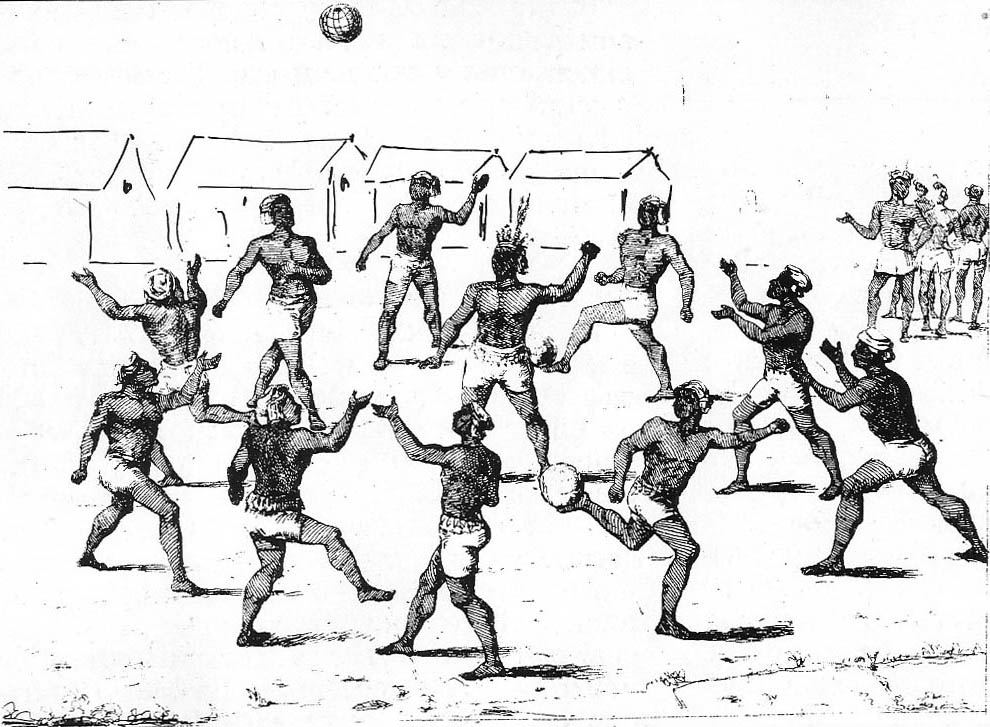
A group of indigenous people playing a ball game in French Guiana

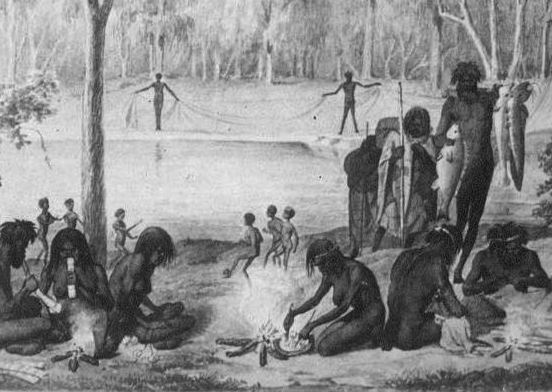
An illustration from the 1850s of indigenous Australians playing marn grook

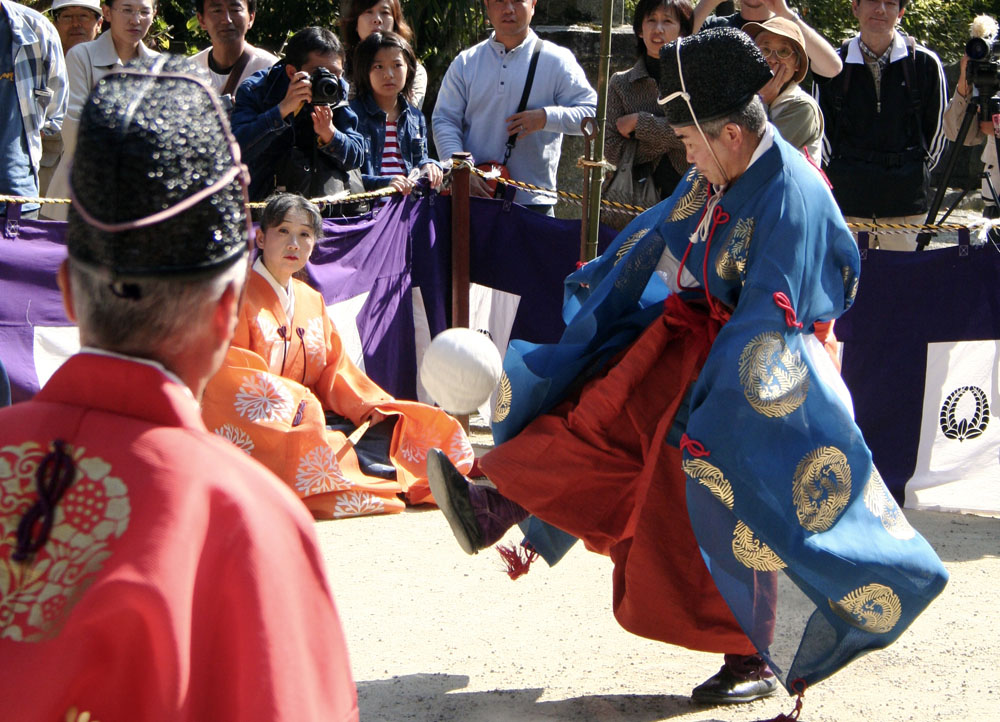
A revived version of kemari being played at the Tanzan Shrine, Japan, 2006

=== Medieval and early modern Europe ===
The Middle Ages saw a huge rise in popularity of annual Shrovetide football matches throughout Europe, particularly in England. An early reference to a ball game played in Britain comes from the 9th-century Historia Brittonum, attributed to Nennius, which describes "a party of boys ... playing at ball". References to a ball game played in northern France known as La Soule or Choule, in which the ball was propelled by hands, feet, and sticks, date from the 12th century.

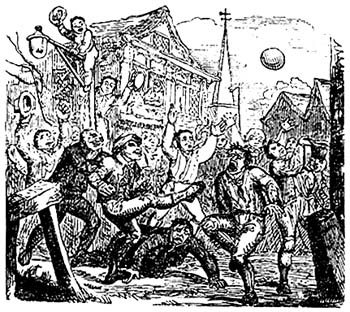
An illustration of so-called "mob football"

The early forms of football played in England, sometimes referred to as "mob football", would be played in towns or between neighbouring villages, involving an unlimited number of players on opposing teams who would clash en masse, struggling to move an item, such as inflated animal's bladder to particular geographical points, such as their opponents' church, with play taking place in the open space between neighbouring parishes. The game was played primarily during significant religious festivals, such as Shrovetide, Christmas, or Easter, and Shrovetide games have survived into the modern era in a number of English towns (see below). The first detailed description of what was almost certainly football in England was given by William FitzStephen in about 1174–1183. He described the activities of London youths during the annual festival of Shrove Tuesday:

After lunch all the youth of the city go out into the fields to take part in a ball game. The students of each school have their own ball; the workers from each city craft are also carrying their balls. Older citizens, fathers, and wealthy citizens come on horseback to watch their juniors competing, and to relive their own youth vicariously: you can see their inner passions aroused as they watch the action and get caught up in the fun being had by the carefree adolescents.

Most of the very early references to the game speak simply of "ball play" or "playing at ball". This reinforces the idea that the games played at the time did not necessarily involve a ball being kicked. An early reference to a ball game that was probably football comes from 1280 at Ulgham, Northumberland, England: "Henry... while playing at ball.. ran against David". Football was played in Ireland in 1308, with a documented reference to John McCrocan, a spectator at a "football game" at Newcastle, County Down being charged with accidentally stabbing a player named William Bernard. Another reference to a football game comes in 1321 at Shouldham, Norfolk, England: "[d]uring the game at ball as he kicked the ball, a lay friend of his... ran against him and wounded himself". In 1314, Nicholas de Farndone, Lord Mayor of the City of London issued a decree banning football in the French used by the English upper classes at the time. A translation reads: "[f]orasmuch as there is great noise in the city caused by hustling over large foot balls [rageries de grosses pelotes de pee] in the fields of the public from which many evils might arise which God forbid: we command and forbid on behalf of the king, on pain of imprisonment, such game to be used in the city in the future." This is the earliest reference to football. In 1363, King Edward III of England issued a proclamation banning "...handball, football, or hockey; coursing and cock-fighting, or other such idle games", showing that "football" – whatever its exact form in this case – was being differentiated from games involving other parts of the body, such as handball.

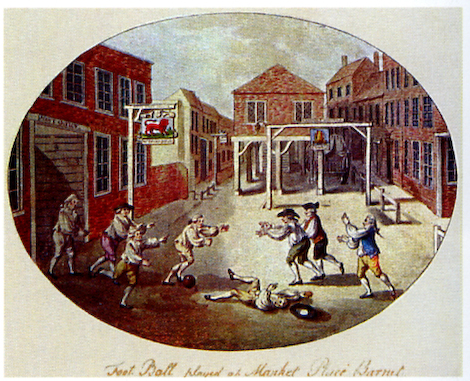
"Football" in France, circa 1750

A game known as "football" was played in Scotland as early as the 15th century: it was prohibited by the Football Act 1424 and although the law fell into disuse it was not repealed until 1906. There is evidence for schoolboys playing a "football" ball game in Aberdeen in 1633 (some references cite 1636) which is notable as an early allusion to what some have considered to be passing the ball. The word "pass" in the most recent translation is derived from "huc percute" (strike it here) and later "repercute pilam" (strike the ball again) in the original Latin. It is not certain that the ball was being struck between members of the same team. The original word translated as "goal" is "metum", literally meaning the "pillar at each end of the circus course" in a Roman chariot race. There is a reference to "get hold of the ball before [another player] does" (Praeripe illi pilam si possis agere) suggesting that handling of the ball was allowed. One sentence states in the original 1930 translation "Throw yourself against him" (Age, objice te illi). King Henry IV of England also presented one of the earliest documented uses of the English word "football", in 1409, when he issued a proclamation forbidding the levying of money for "foteball". There is also an account in Latin from the end of the 15th century of football being played at Caunton, Nottinghamshire. This is the first description of a "kicking game" and the first description of dribbling: "[t]he game at which they had met for common recreation is called by some the foot-ball game. It is one in which young men, in country sport, propel a huge ball not by throwing it into the air but by striking it and rolling it along the ground, and that not with their hands but with their feet... kicking in opposite directions." The chronicler gives the earliest reference to a football pitch, stating that: "[t]he boundaries have been marked and the game had started.

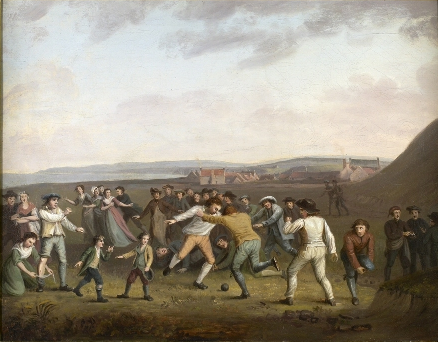
Oldest known painting of foot-ball in Scotland, by Alexander Carse, c. 1810

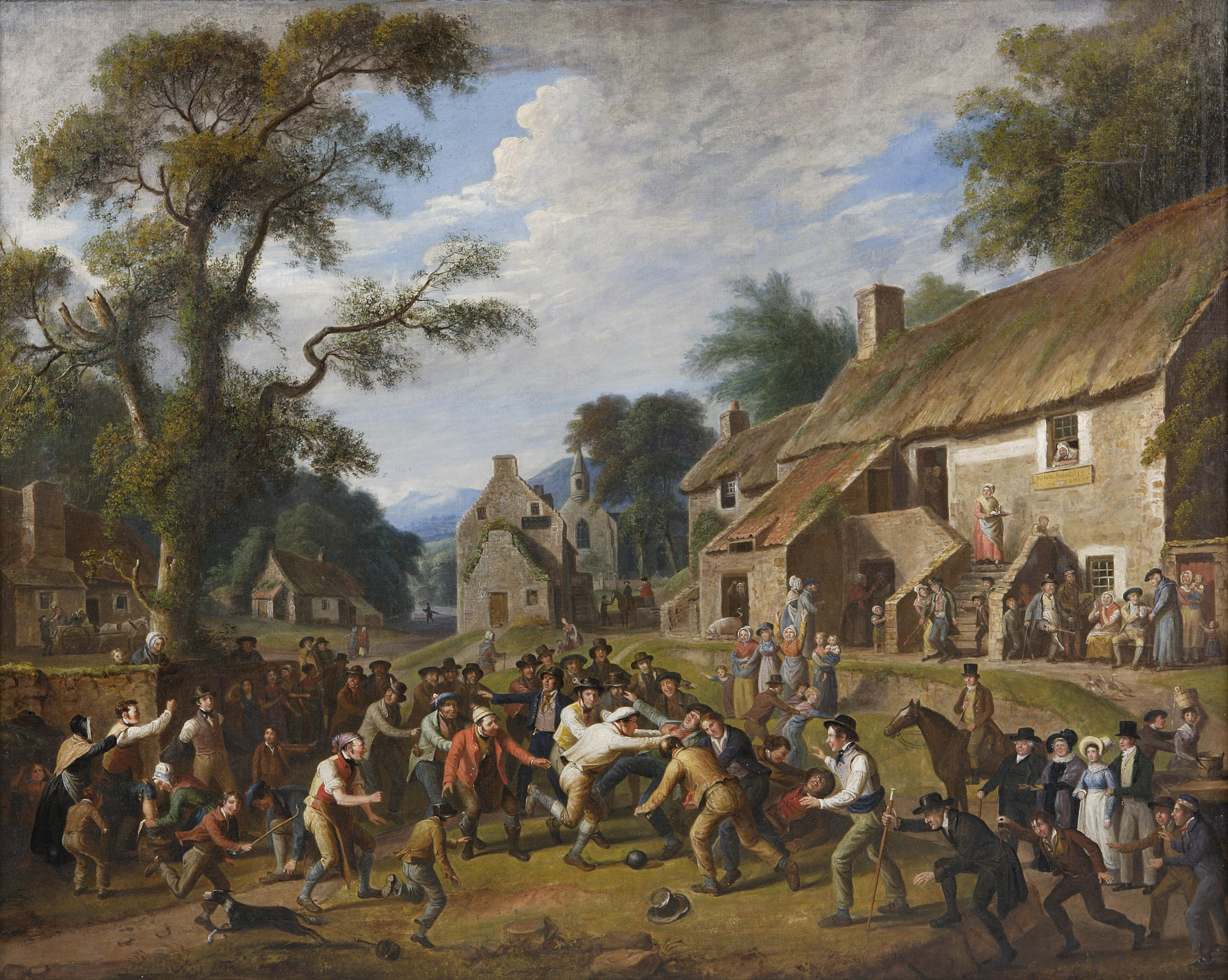
"Football" in Scotland, c. 1830

Other firsts in the medieval and early modern eras:

- "A football", in the sense of a ball rather than a game, was first mentioned in 1486. This reference is in Dame Juliana Berners' Book of St Albans. It states: "a certain rounde instrument to play with ...it is an instrument for the foote and then it is calde in Latyn 'pila pedalis', a fotebal".
- A pair of football boots were ordered by King Henry VIII of England in 1526.
- Women playing a form of football was first described in 1580 by Sir Philip Sidney in one of his poems: "[a] tyme there is for all, my mother often sayes, when she, with skirts tuckt very hy, with girles at football playes".
- The first references to goals are in the late 16th and early 17th centuries. In 1584 and 1602 respectively, John Norden and Richard Carew referred to "goals" in Cornish hurling. Carew described how goals were made: "they pitch two bushes in the ground, some eight or ten foote asunder; and directly against them, ten or twelue [twelve] score off, other twayne in like distance, which they terme their Goales". He is also the first to describe goalkeepers and passing of the ball between players.
- The first direct reference to scoring a goal is in John Day's play The Blind Beggar of Bethnal Green (performed circa 1600; published 1659): "I'll play a gole at camp-ball" (an extremely violent variety of football, which was popular in East Anglia). Similarly in a poem in 1613, Michael Drayton refers to "when the Ball to throw, and drive it to the Gole, in squadrons forth they goe".

=== Calcio fiorentino ===
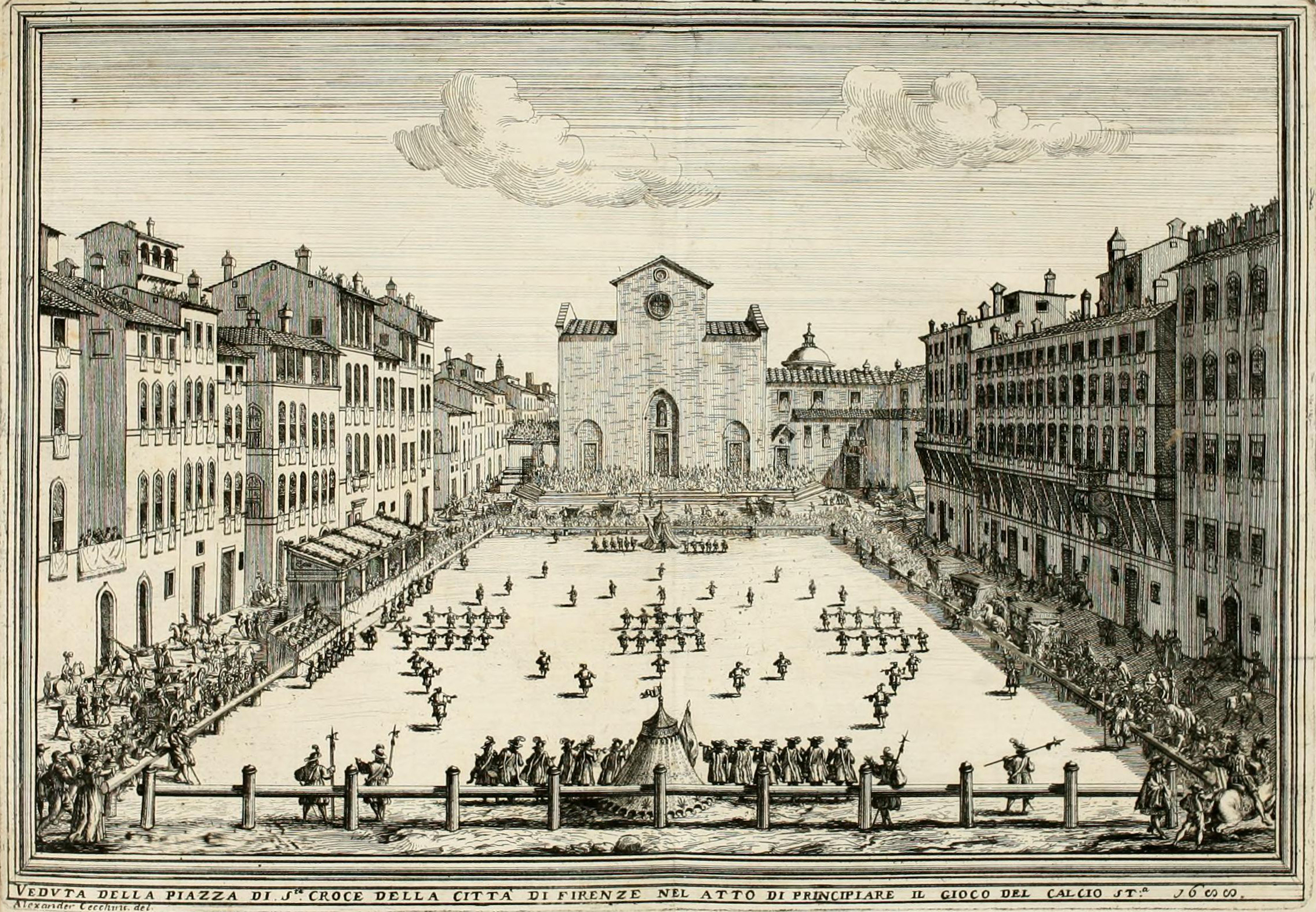
An illustration of the calcio fiorentino field and starting positions, from a 1688 book by Pietro di Lorenzo Bini

In the 16th century, the city of Florence celebrated the period between Epiphany and Lent by playing a game which today is known as "calcio storico" ("historic kickball") in the Piazza Santa Croce. The young aristocrats of the city would dress up in fine silk costumes and embroil themselves in a violent form of football. For example, calcio players could punch, shoulder charge, and kick opponents. Blows below the belt were allowed. The game is said to have originated as a military training exercise. In 1580, Count Giovanni de' Bardi di Vernio wrote Discorso sopra il giuoco del calcio fiorentino. This is sometimes said to be the earliest code of rules for any football game. The game was not played after January 1739 (until it was revived in May 1930).

=== Official disapproval and attempts to ban football ===
There have been many attempts to ban football, from the Middle Ages through to the modern day. The first such law was passed in England in 1314; it was followed by more than 30 in England alone between 1314 and 1667. Women were banned from playing at English and Scottish Football League grounds in 1921, a ban that was only lifted in the 1970s. Female footballers still face similar problems in some parts of the world. American football also faced pressures to ban the sport. The game played in the 19th century resembled mob football that developed in medieval Europe, including a version popular on university campuses known as old division football, and several municipalities banned its play in the mid-19th century. By the 20th century, the game had evolved to a more rugby style game. In 1905, there were calls to ban American football in the U.S. due to its violence; a meeting that year was hosted by American president Theodore Roosevelt led to sweeping rules changes that caused the sport to diverge significantly from its rugby roots to become more like the sport as it is played today.

== Establishment of modern codes ==
=== English public schools ===
While football continued to be played in various forms throughout Britain, its public schools (equivalent to private schools in other countries) are widely credited with four key achievements in the creation of modern football codes. First of all, the evidence suggests that they were important in taking football away from its "mob" form and turning it into an organised team sport. Second, many early descriptions of football and references to it were recorded by people who had studied at these schools. Third, it was teachers, students, and former students from these schools who first codified football games, to enable matches to be played between schools. Finally, it was at English public schools that the division between "kicking" and "running" (or "carrying") games first became clear. The earliest evidence that games resembling football were being played at English public schools – mainly attended by boys from the upper, upper-middle and professional classes – comes from the Vulgaria by William Herman in 1519. Herman had been headmaster at Eton and Winchester colleges and his Latin textbook includes a translation exercise with the phrase "We wyll playe with a ball full of wynde". Richard Mulcaster, a student at Eton College in the early 16th century and later headmaster at other English schools, has been described as "the greatest sixteenth Century advocate of football". Among his contributions are the earliest evidence of organised team football. Mulcaster's writings refer to teams ("sides" and "parties"), positions ("standings"), a referee ("judge over the parties") and a coach "(trayning maister)". Mulcaster's "footeball" had evolved from the disordered and violent forms of traditional football:

[s]ome smaller number with such overlooking, sorted into sides and standings, not meeting with their bodies so boisterously to trie their strength: nor shouldring or shuffing one an other so barbarously ... may use footeball for as much good to the body, by the chiefe use of the legges.

In 1633, David Wedderburn, a teacher from Aberdeen, mentioned elements of modern football games in a short Latin textbook called Vocabula. Wedderburn refers to what has been translated into modern English as "keeping goal" and makes an allusion to passing the ball ("strike it here"). There is a reference to "get hold of the ball", suggesting that some handling was allowed. It is clear that the tackles allowed included the charging and holding of opposing players ("drive that man back"). A more detailed description of football is given in Francis Willughby's Book of Games, written in about 1660. Willughby, who had studied at Bishop Vesey's Grammar School, Sutton Coldfield, is the first to describe goals and a distinct playing field: "a close that has a gate at either end. The gates are called Goals." His book includes a diagram illustrating a football field. He also mentions tactics ("leaving some of their best players to guard the goal"); scoring ("they that can strike the ball through their opponents' goal first win") and the way teams were selected ("the players being equally divided according to their strength and nimbleness"). He is the first to describe a "law" of football: "they must not strike [an opponent's leg] higher than the ball". English public schools were the first to codify football games. In particular, they devised the first offside rules, during the late 18th century. In the earliest manifestations of these rules, players were "off their side" if they simply stood between the ball and the goal which was their objective. Players were not allowed to pass the ball forward, either by foot or by hand. They could only dribble with their feet, or advance the ball in a scrum or similar formation. However, offside laws began to diverge and develop differently at each school, as is shown by the rules of football from Winchester, Rugby, Harrow and Cheltenham, between 1810 and 1850. The first known codes – in the sense of a set of rules – were those of Eton in 1815 and Aldenham in 1825.) During the early 19th century, most working-class people in Britain had to work six days a week, often for over twelve hours a day. They had neither the time nor the inclination to engage in sport for recreation and, at the time, many children were part of the labour force. Feast day football played on the streets was in decline. Public school boys, who enjoyed some freedom from work, became the inventors of organised football games with formal codes of rules. Football was adopted by a number of public schools as a way of encouraging competitiveness and keeping youths fit. Each school drafted its own rules, which varied widely between different schools and were changed over time with each new intake of pupils. Two schools of thought developed regarding rules. Some schools favoured a game in which the ball could be carried (as at Rugby, Marlborough and Cheltenham), while others preferred a game where kicking and dribbling the ball was promoted (as at Eton, Harrow, Westminster and Charterhouse). The division into these two camps was partly the result of circumstances in which the games were played. For example, Charterhouse and Westminster at the time had restricted playing areas; the boys were confined to playing their ball game within the school cloisters, making it difficult for them to adopt rough and tumble running games.

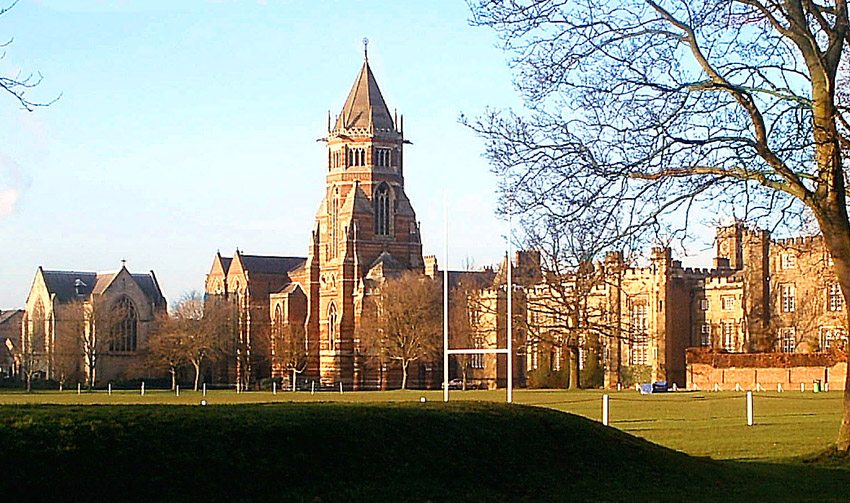
Although the Rugby School (pictured) became famous due to a version that rugby football was invented there in 1823, most sports historians refuse this version stating it is apocryphal.

William Webb Ellis, a pupil at Rugby School, is said to have "with a fine disregard for the rules of football, as played in his time [emphasis added], first took the ball in his arms and ran with it, thus creating the distinctive feature of the rugby game." in 1823. This act is usually said to be the beginning of Rugby football, but there is little evidence that it occurred, and most sports historians believe the story to be apocryphal. The act of 'taking the ball in his arms' is often misinterpreted as 'picking the ball up' as it is widely believed that Webb Ellis' 'crime' was handling the ball, as in modern association football. However, handling the ball at the time was often permitted, and in some cases was even compulsory. The rule for which Webb Ellis showed disregard was running forward with it as the rules of his time only allowed a player to retreat backwards or kick forwards. The boom in rail transport in Britain during the 1840s meant that people were able to travel farther and with less inconvenience than they ever had before. Inter-school sporting competitions became possible. However, it was difficult for schools to play each other at football, as each school played by its own rules. The solution to this problem was usually that the match be divided into two-halves, one half played by the rules of the host "home" school, and the other half by the visiting "away" school. The modern rules of many football codes were formulated during the mid- or late- 19th century. This also applies to other sports such as lawn bowls, lawn tennis, etc. The major impetus for this was the patenting of the world's first lawnmower in 1830. This allowed for the preparation of modern ovals, playing fields, pitches, grass courts, etc. Apart from Rugby football, the public school codes have barely been played beyond the confines of each school's playing fields. However, many of them are still played at the schools which created them (see § British schools). In 1845, three boys at Rugby school were tasked with codifying the rules then being used at the school. These were the first set of written rules (or code) for any form of football. This further assisted the spread of the Rugby game.

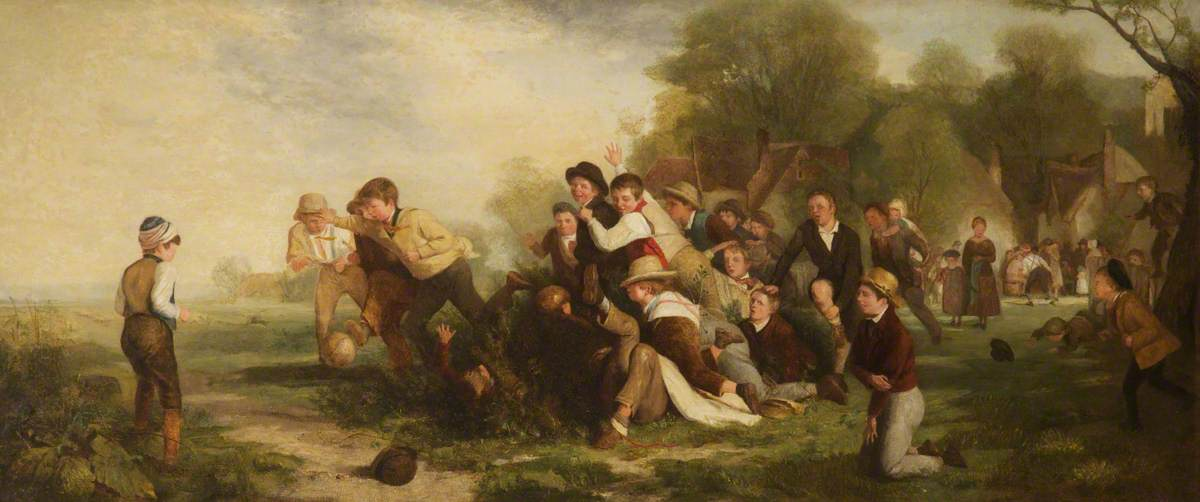
Football (1839) by British painter Thomas Webster

Public schools' dominance of sports in the UK began to wane after the Factory Act 1850, which significantly increased the recreation time available to working class children. Before 1850, many British children had to work six days a week, for more than twelve hours a day. From 1850, they were forbidden from working before 6 a.m. (7 a.m. in winter) or after 6 p.m. on weekdays (7 p.m. in winter); on Saturdays they had to cease work at 2 pm. These changes meant that working class children had more time for games, including various forms of football.

=== Firsts ===
==== Matches ====
The earliest known matches between public schools are as follows:

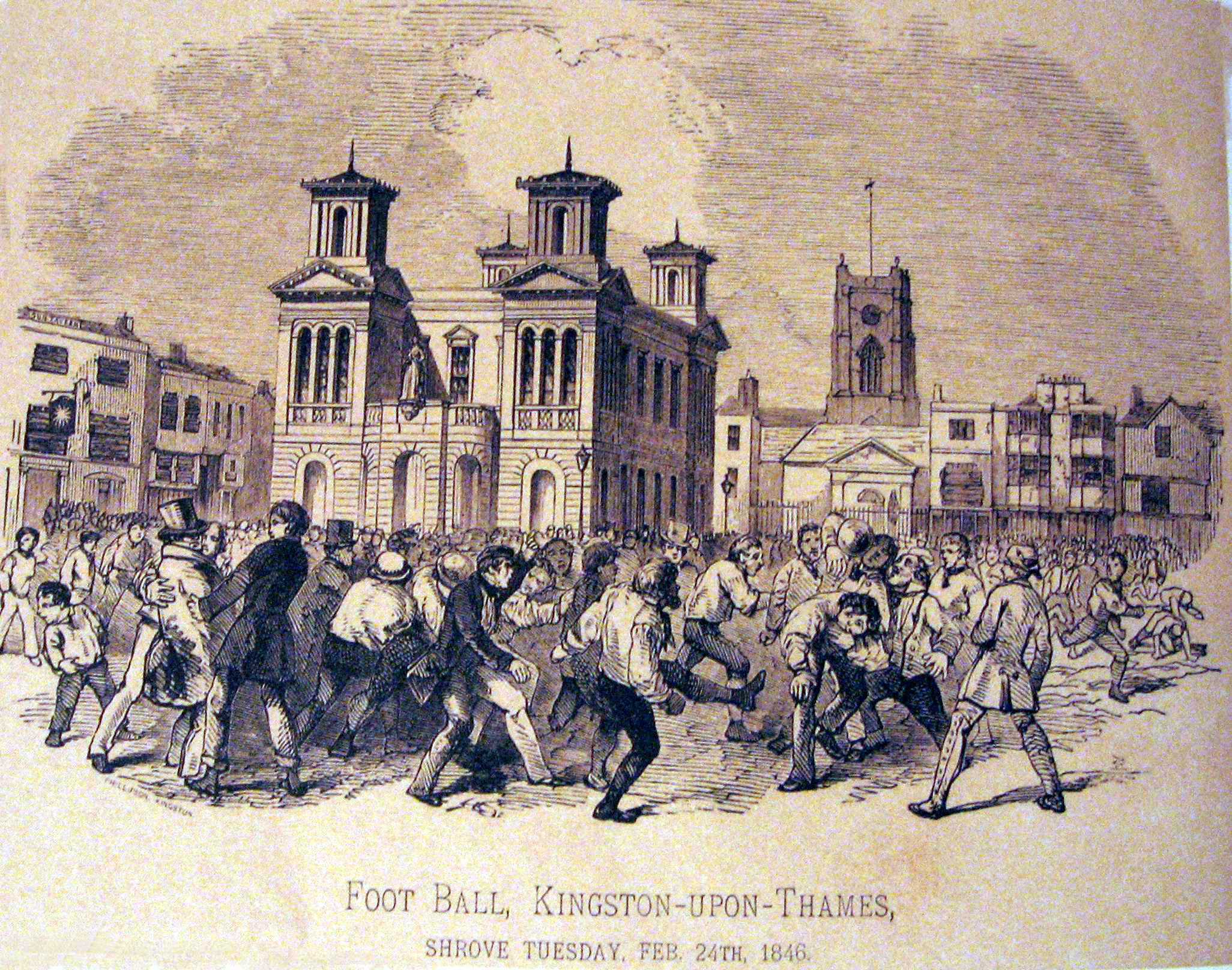
Football match in the 1846 Shrove Tuesday in Kingston upon Thames, England

- 9 December 1834: Eton School v. Harrow School.
- 1840s: Old Rugbeians v. Old Salopians (played at Cambridge University).
- 1840s: Old Rugbeians v. Old Salopians (played at Cambridge University the following year).
- 1852: Harrow School v. Westminster School.
- 1857: Haileybury School v. Westminster School.
- 24 February 1858: Forest School v. Chigwell School.
- 1858: Westminster School v. Winchester College.
- 1859: Harrow School v. Westminster School.
- 19 November 1859: Radley College v. Old Wykehamists.
- 1 December 1859: Old Marlburians v. Old Rugbeians (played at Christ Church, Oxford).
- 19 December 1859: Old Harrovians v. Old Wykehamists (played at Christ Church, Oxford).

The earliest known matches involving non-public school clubs or institutions are as follows:

- 13 February 1856: Charterhouse School v. St Bartholemew's Hospital.
- 7 November 1856: Bedford Grammar School v. Bedford Town Gentlemen.
- 13 December 1856: Sunbury Military College v. Littleton Gentlemen.
- December 1857: Edinburgh University v. Edinburgh Academical Club.
- 24 November 1858: Westminster School v. Dingley Dell Club.
- 12 May 1859: Tavistock School v. Princetown School.
- 5 November 1859: Eton School v. Oxford University.
- 22 February 1860: Charterhouse School v. Dingley Dell Club.
- 21 July 1860: Melbourne v. Richmond.
- 17 December 1860: 58th Regiment v. Sheffield.
- 26 December 1860: Sheffield v. Hallam.

==== Clubs ====
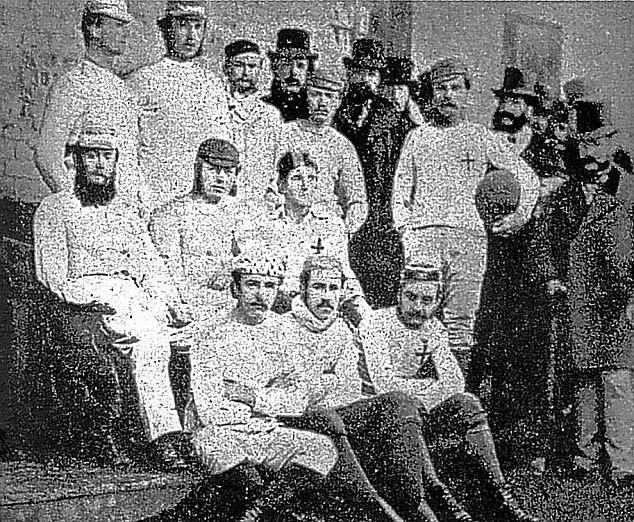
Sheffield F.C. (here pictured in 1857, the year of its foundation) is the oldest surviving association football club in the world.

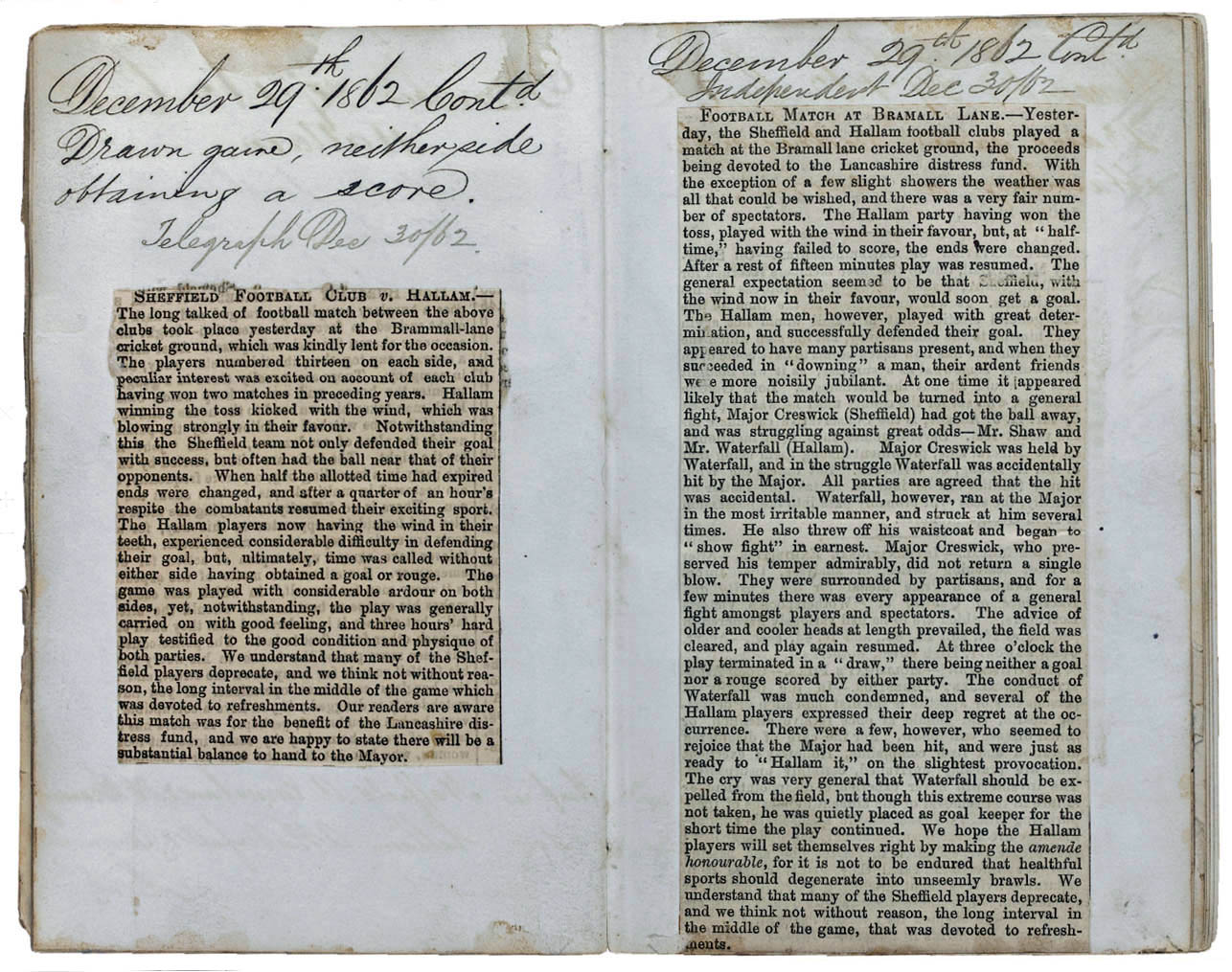
Notes about a Sheffield v. Hallam match, dated 29 December 1862

Sports clubs dedicated to playing football began in the 18th century, for example London's Gymnastic Society which was founded in the mid-18th century and ceased playing matches in 1796. The first documented club to bear in the title a reference to being a 'football club' were called "The Foot-Ball Club" who were located in Edinburgh, Scotland, during the period 1824–41. The club forbade tripping but allowed pushing and holding and the picking up of the ball.

==== Competitions ====
One of the longest running football fixtures is the Cordner-Eggleston Cup, contested between Melbourne Grammar School and Scotch College, Melbourne every year since 1858. It is believed by many to also be the first match of Australian rules football, although it was played under experimental rules in its first year. The first football trophy tournament was the Caledonian Challenge Cup, donated by the Royal Caledonian Society of Melbourne, played in 1861 under the Melbourne Rules. The oldest football league is a rugby football competition, the United Hospitals Challenge Cup (1874), while the oldest rugby trophy is the Yorkshire Cup, contested since 1878. The South Australian Football Association (30 April 1877) is the oldest surviving Australian rules football competition. The oldest surviving soccer trophy is the Youdan Cup (1867) and the oldest national football competition is the English FA Cup (1871). The Football League (1888) is recognised as the longest running association football league. The first international Rugby football match took place between Scotland and England on 27 March 1871 at Raeburn Place, Edinburgh. The first international Association football match officially took place between sides representing England and Scotland on 30 November 1872 at Hamilton Crescent, the West of Scotland Cricket Club's ground in Partick, Glasgow under the authority of the FA.

==== Modern balls ====
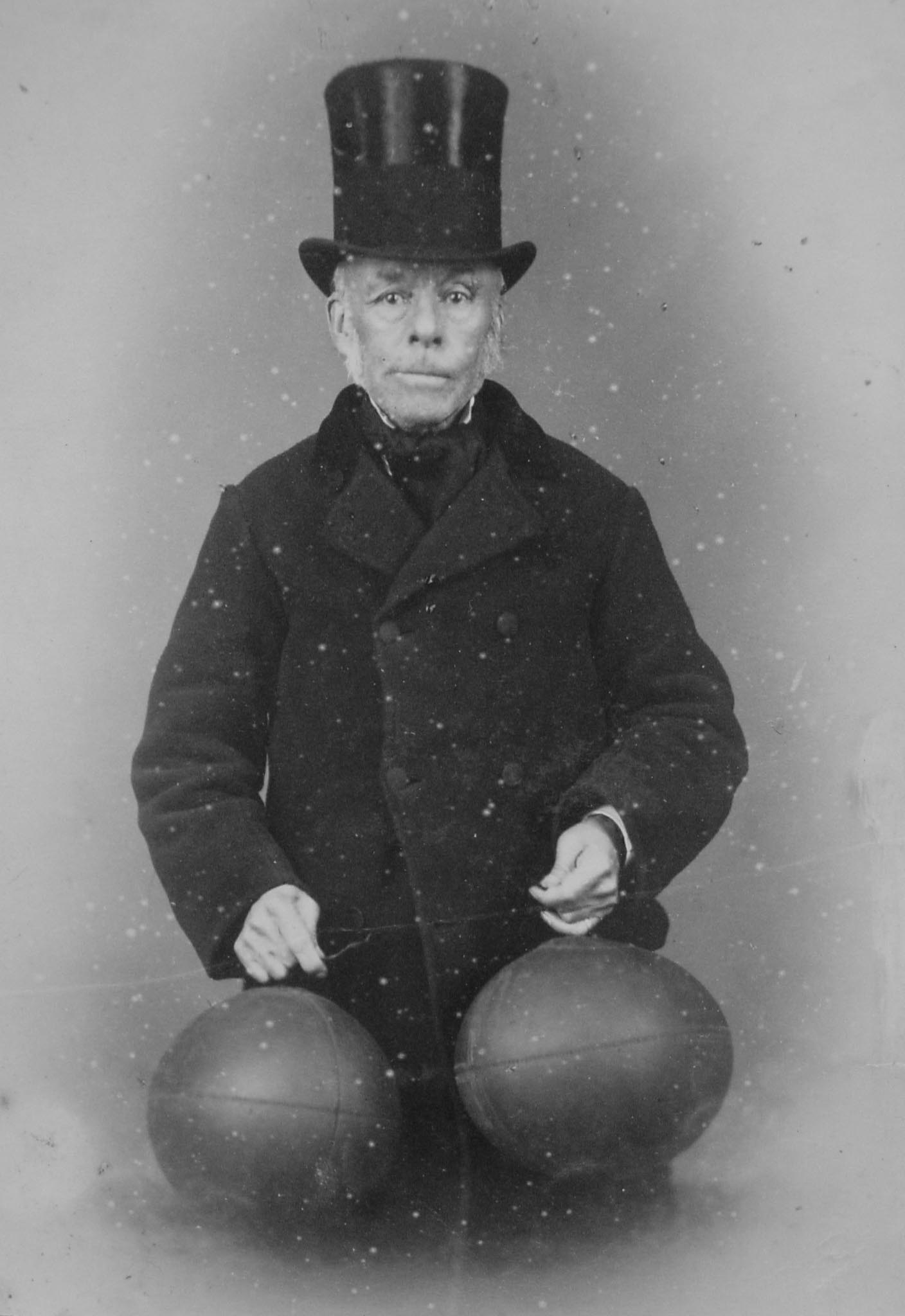
Richard Lindon (seen in 1880) is believed to have invented the first footballs with rubber bladders.

In Europe, early footballs were made out of animal bladders, more specifically pig's bladders, which were inflated. Later leather coverings were introduced to allow the balls to keep their shape. However, in 1851, Richard Lindon and William Gilbert, both shoemakers from the town of Rugby (near the school), exhibited both round and oval-shaped balls at the Great Exhibition in London. Richard Lindon's wife is said to have died of lung disease caused by blowing up pig's bladders. (Note: The exact name of Mr Lindon is in dispute, as well as the exact timing of the creation of the inflatable bladder. It is known that he created this for both association and rugby footballs. However, sites devoted to football indicate he was known as HJ Lindon, who was actually Richard Lindon's son, and created the ball in 1862, whereas rugby sites refer to him as Richard Lindon creating the ball in 1870. Both agree that his wife died when inflating pig's bladders. This information originated from web sites which may be unreliable, and the answer may only be found in researching books in central libraries.) Lindon also won medals for the invention of the "Rubber inflatable Bladder" and the "Brass Hand Pump". In 1855, the U.S. inventor Charles Goodyear – who had patented vulcanised rubber – exhibited a spherical football, with an exterior of vulcanised rubber panels, at the Paris Exhibition Universelle. The ball was to prove popular in early forms of football in the U.S. In the 1920s, Wilson Sporting Goods worked with Notre Dame coach Knute Rockne to create a double-lined leather football and a valve-inflated design for American football. The iconic ball with a regular pattern of hexagons and pentagons (see truncated icosahedron) did not become popular until the 1960s, and was first used in the World Cup in 1970.

==== Modern ball passing tactics ====
The earliest reference to a game of football involving players passing the ball and attempting to score past a goalkeeper was written in 1633 by David Wedderburn, a poet and teacher in Aberdeen, Scotland. Nevertheless, the original text does not state whether the allusion to passing as 'kick the ball back' ('repercute pilam') was in a forward or backward direction or between members of the same opposing teams (as was usual at this time). "Scientific" football is first recorded in 1839 from Lancashire and in the modern game in rugby football from 1862 and from Sheffield FC as early as 1865. The first side to play a passing combination game was the Royal Engineers AFC in 1869/70. However, according to match reports from Sheffield, passing and combination play were already developing in the region in the 1860's. By 1869 they were "work[ing] well together", "backing up" and benefiting from "cooperation". By 1870 the Engineers were passing the ball: "Lieut. Creswell, who having brought the ball up the side then kicked it into the middle to another of his side, who kicked it through the posts the minute before time was called". Passing was a regular feature of their style. By early 1872 the Engineers were the first football team renowned for "play[ing] beautifully together". A double pass is first reported from Derby school against Nottingham Forest in March 1872, the first of which is irrefutably a short pass: "Mr Absey dribbling the ball half the length of the field delivered it to Wallis, who kicking it cleverly in front of the goal, sent it to the captain who drove it at once between the Nottingham posts". The first side to have perfected the modern formation was Cambridge University AFC; they also introduced the 2–3–5 "pyramid" formation.

=== Rugby football ===
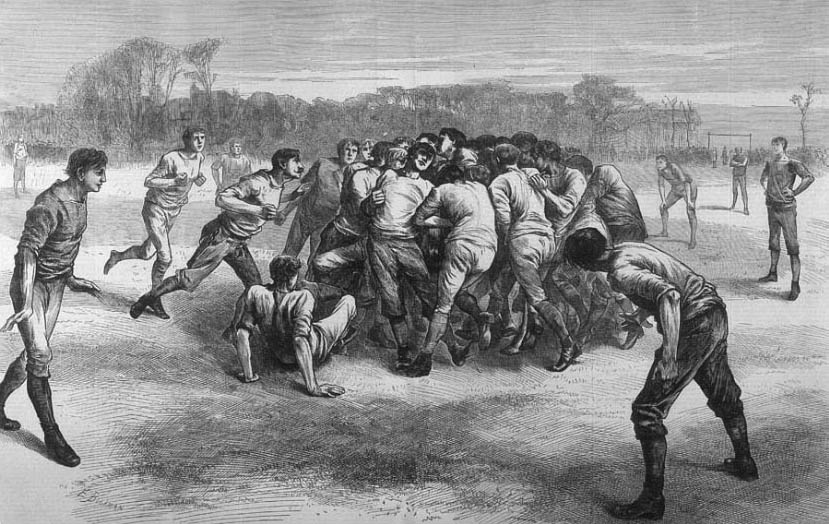
The Last Scrimmage by Edwin Buckman, depicting a rugby scrum in 1871

Rugby football was thought to have been started about 1845 at Rugby School in Rugby, Warwickshire, England although forms of football in which the ball was carried and tossed date to medieval times. In Britain, by 1870, there were 49 clubs playing variations of the Rugby school game. There were also "rugby" clubs in Ireland, Australia, Canada and New Zealand. However, there was no generally accepted set of rules for rugby until 1871, when 21 clubs from London came together to form the Rugby Football Union (RFU). The first official RFU rules were adopted in June 1871. These rules allowed passing the ball. They also included the try, where touching the ball over the line allowed an attempt at goal, though drop-goals from marks and general play, and penalty conversions were still the main form of contest. Regardless of any form of football, the first international match between the national team of England and Scotland took place at Raeburn Place on 27 March 1871. Rugby football split into Rugby union, Rugby league, American football, and Canadian football. Tom Wills played Rugby football in England before founding Australian rules football.

=== Cambridge rules ===
During the nineteenth century, several codifications of the rules of football were made at the University of Cambridge, to enable students from different public schools to play each other. The Cambridge Rules of 1863 influenced the decision of the Football Association to ban Rugby-style carrying of the ball in its own first set of laws.

=== Sheffield rules ===
By the late 1850s, many football clubs had been formed throughout the English-speaking world, to play various codes of football. Sheffield Football Club, founded in 1857 in the English city of Sheffield by Nathaniel Creswick and William Prest, was later recognised as the world's oldest club playing association football. However, the club initially played its own code of football: the Sheffield rules. The code was largely independent of the public school rules, the most significant difference being the lack of an offside rule. The code was responsible for many innovations that later spread to association football. These included free kicks, corner kicks, handball, throw-ins and the crossbar. By the 1870s they became the dominant code in the north and midlands of England. At this time, a series of rule changes by both the London and Sheffield FAs gradually eroded the differences between the two games until the adoption of a common code in 1877.

=== Australian rules football ===
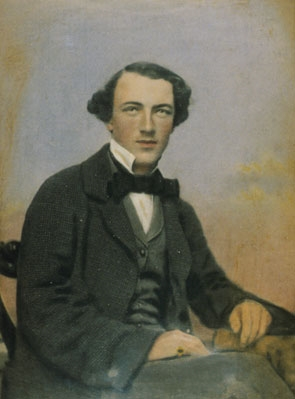
Tom Wills, major figure in the creation of Australian football

There is archival evidence of "foot-ball" games being played in various parts of Australia throughout the first half of the 19th century. The origins of an organised game of football known today as Australian rules football can be traced back to 1858 in Melbourne, the capital city of Victoria. In July 1858, Tom Wills, an Australian-born cricketer educated at Rugby School in England, wrote a letter to Bell's Life in Victoria & Sporting Chronicle, calling for a "foot-ball club" with a "code of laws" to keep cricketers fit during winter. This is considered by historians to be a defining moment in the creation of Australian rules football. Through publicity and personal contacts Wills was able to co-ordinate football matches in Melbourne that experimented with various rules, the first of which was played on 31 July 1858. One week later, Wills umpired a schoolboys match between Melbourne Grammar School and Scotch College. Following these matches, organised football in Melbourne rapidly increased in popularity.

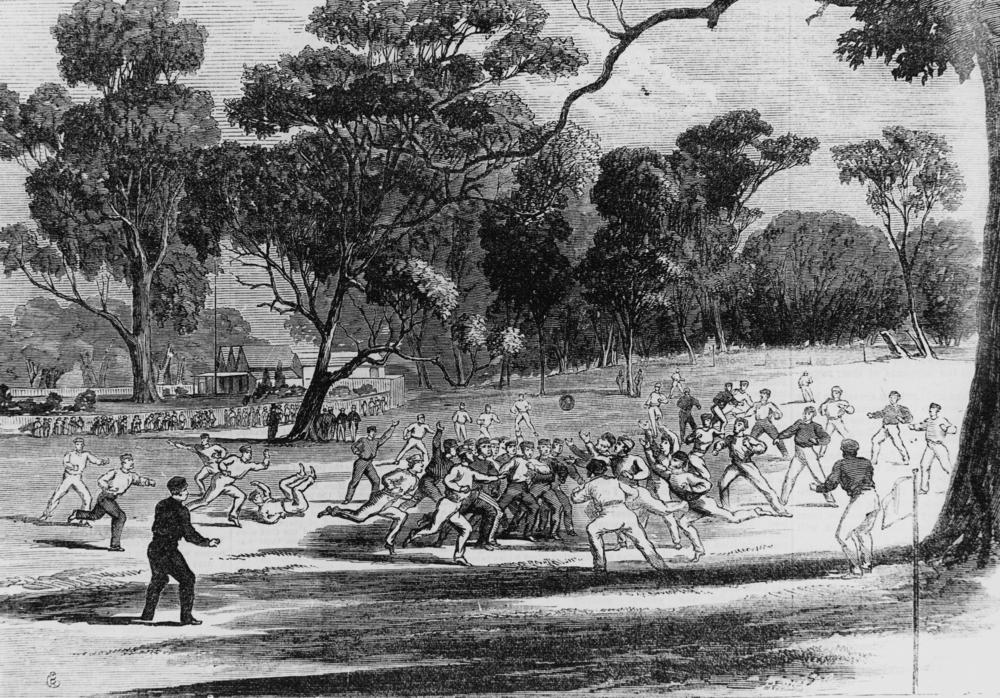
Wood engraving of an Australian rules football match at the Richmond Paddock, Melbourne, 1866

Wills and others involved in these early matches formed the Melbourne Football Club (the oldest surviving Australian football club) on 14 May 1859. Club members Wills, William Hammersley, J. B. Thompson and Thomas H. Smith met with the intention of forming a set of rules that would be widely adopted by other clubs. The committee debated rules used in English public school games; Wills pushed for various rugby football rules he learnt during his schooling. The first rules share similarities with these games, and were shaped to suit to Australian conditions. H. C. A. Harrison, a seminal figure in Australian football, recalled that his cousin Wills wanted "a game of our own". The code was distinctive in the prevalence of the mark, free kick, tackling, lack of an offside rule and that players were specifically penalised for throwing the ball. The Melbourne football rules were widely distributed and gradually adopted by the other Victorian clubs. The rules were updated several times during the 1860s to accommodate the rules of other influential Victorian football clubs. A significant redraft in 1866 by H. C. A. Harrison's committee accommodated the Geelong Football Club's rules, making the game then known as "Victorian Rules" increasingly distinct from other codes. It soon adopted cricket fields and an oval ball, used specialised goal and behind posts, and featured bouncing the ball while running and spectacular high marking. The game spread quickly to other Australian colonies. Outside its heartland in southern Australia, the code experienced a significant period of decline following World War I but has since grown throughout Australia and in other parts of the world, and the Australian Football League emerged as the dominant professional competition.

=== The Football Association ===
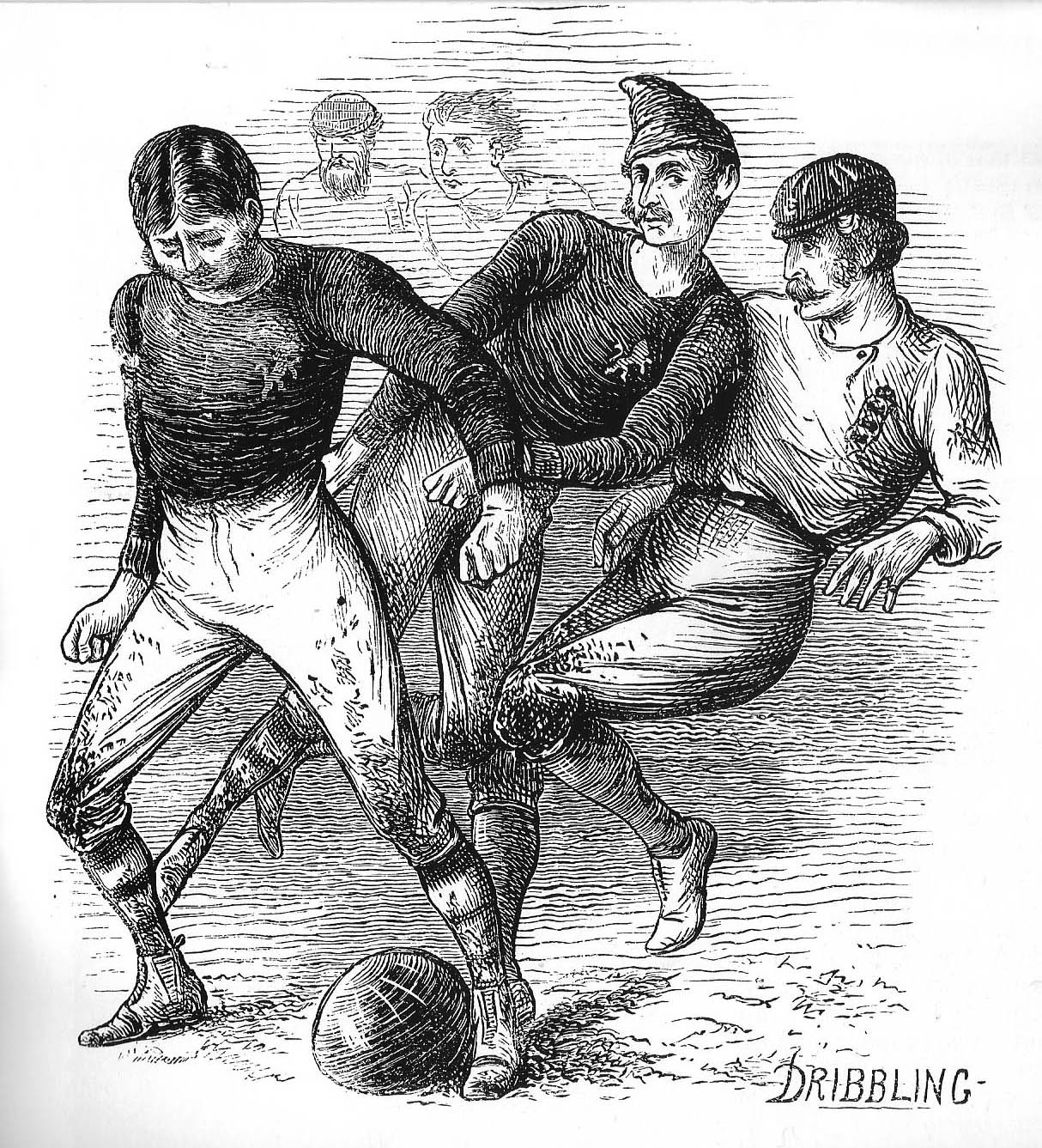
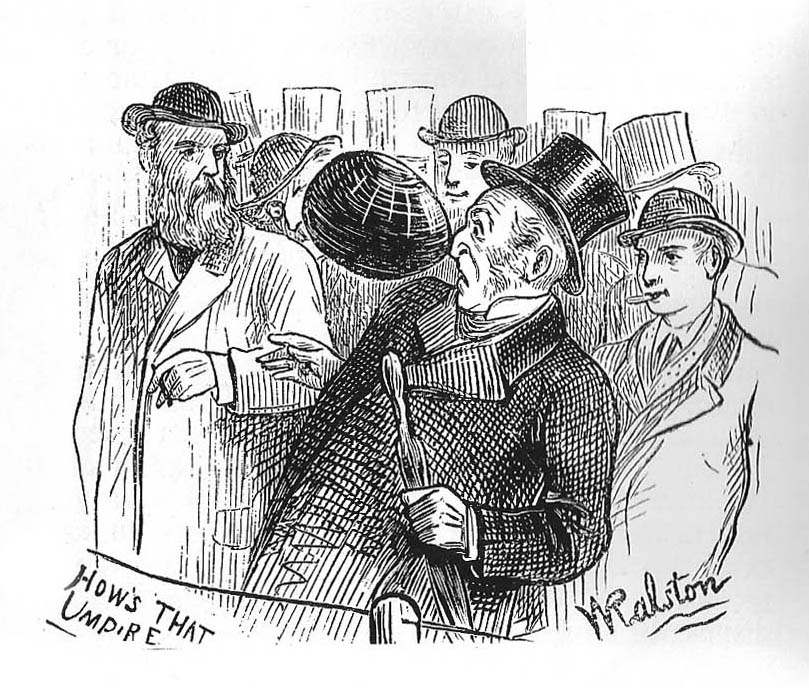
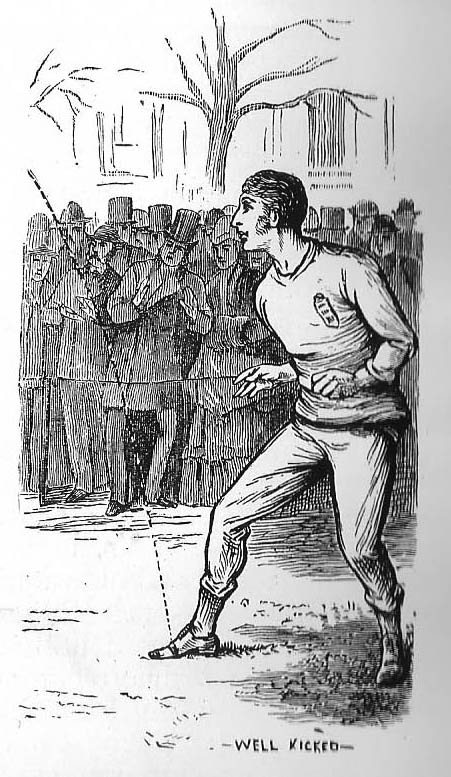
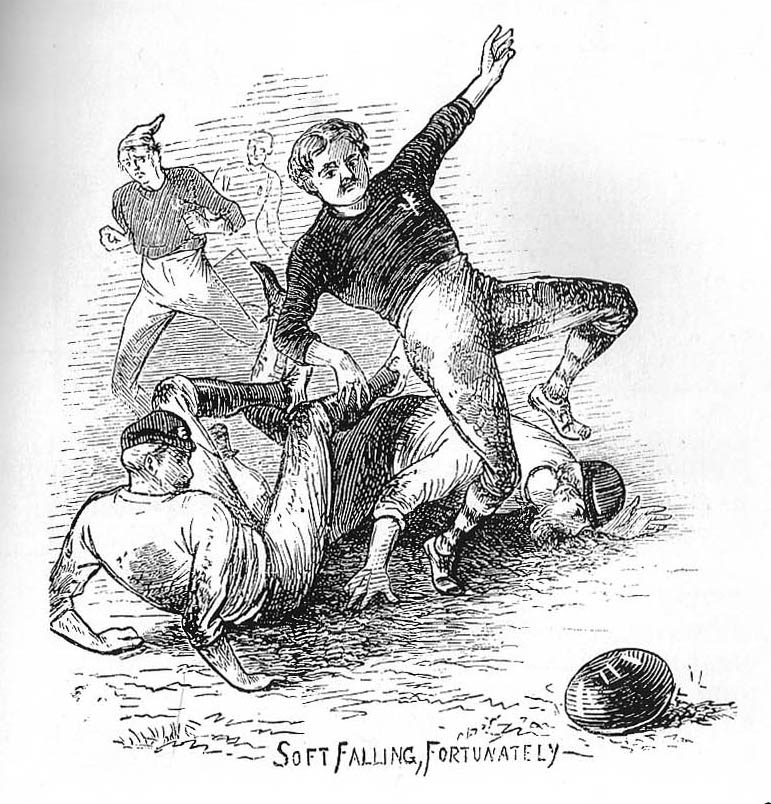
The first football international, Scotland versus England. Once kept by the Rugby Football Union as an early example of rugby football.

During the early 1860s, there were increasing attempts in England to unify and reconcile the various public school games. In 1862, J. C. Thring, who had been one of the driving forces behind the original Cambridge Rules, was a master at Uppingham School, and he issued his own rules of what he called "The Simplest Game" (these are also known as the Uppingham Rules). In early October 1863, another new revised version of the Cambridge Rules was drawn up by a seven member committee representing former pupils from Harrow, Shrewsbury, Eton, Rugby, Marlborough and Westminster. At the Freemasons' Tavern, Great Queen Street, London on the evening of 26 October 1863, representatives of several football clubs in the London Metropolitan area met for the inaugural meeting of the Football Association (FA). The aim of the association was to establish a single unifying code and regulate the playing of the game among its members. Following the first meeting, the public schools were invited to join the association. All of them declined, except Charterhouse and Uppingham. In total, six meetings of the FA were held between October and December 1863. After the third meeting, a draft set of rules was published. However, at the beginning of the fourth meeting, attention was drawn to the recently published Cambridge Rules of 1863. The Cambridge rules differed from the draft FA rules in two significant areas; namely running with (carrying) the ball and hacking (kicking opposing players in the shins). The two contentious FA rules were as follows:

IX. A player shall be entitled to run with the ball towards his adversaries' goal if he makes a fair catch, or catches the ball on the first bound; but in case of a fair catch, if he makes his mark he shall not run.

X. If any player shall run with the ball towards his adversaries' goal, any player on the opposite side shall be at liberty to charge, hold, trip or hack him, or to wrest the ball from him, but no player shall be held and hacked at the same time.

At the fifth meeting it was proposed that these two rules be removed. Most of the delegates supported this, but F. M. Campbell, the representative from Blackheath and the first FA treasurer, objected. He said: "hacking is the true football". However, the motion to ban running with the ball in hand and hacking was carried and Blackheath withdrew from the FA. After the final meeting on 8 December, the FA published the "Laws of the Game", the first comprehensive set of rules for the game later known as association football. The term "soccer", in use since the late 19th century, derives from an Oxford University abbreviation of "association". The first FA rules still contained elements that are no longer part of association football, but which are still recognisable in other games (such as Australian football and rugby football): for instance, a player could make a fair catch and claim a mark, which entitled him to a free kick; and if a player touched the ball behind the opponents' goal line, his side was entitled to a free kick at goal, from 15 yards (13.5 metres) in front of the goal line.

=== North American football codes ===
As was the case in Britain, by the early 19th century, North American schools and universities played their own local games, between sides made up of students. For example, students at Dartmouth College in New Hampshire played a game called Old division football, a variant of the association football codes, as early as the 1820s. They remained largely "mob football" style games, with huge numbers of players attempting to advance the ball into a goal area, often by any means necessary. Rules were simple, violence and injury were common. The violence of these mob-style games led to widespread protests and a decision to abandon them. Yale University, under pressure from the city of New Haven, banned the play of all forms of football in 1860, while Harvard University followed suit in 1861. In its place, two general types of football evolved: "kicking" games and "running" (or "carrying") games. A hybrid of the two, known as the "Boston game", was played by a group known as the Oneida Football Club. The club, considered by some historians as the first formal football club in the United States, was formed in 1862 by schoolboys who played the Boston game on Boston Common. The game began to return to American college campuses by the late 1860s. The universities of Yale, Princeton (then known as the College of New Jersey), Rutgers, and Brown all began playing "kicking" games during this time. In 1867, Princeton used rules based on those of the English Football Association.

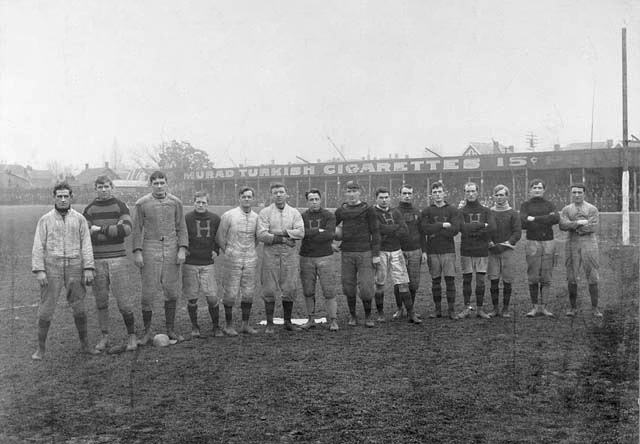
The Tigers of Hamilton, Ontario, circa 1906. Founded 1869 as the Hamilton Foot Ball Club, they eventually merged with the Hamilton Flying Wildcats to form the Hamilton Tiger-Cats, a team still active in the Canadian Football League.

In Canada, the first documented football match was a practice game played on 9 November 1861, at University College, University of Toronto (approximately 400 yards west of Queen's Park). One of the participants in the game involving University of Toronto students was (Sir) William Mulock, later Chancellor of the school. In 1864, at Trinity College, Toronto, F. Barlow Cumberland, Frederick A. Bethune, and Christopher Gwynn, one of the founders of Milton, Massachusetts, devised rules based on rugby football. A "running game", resembling rugby football, was then taken up by the Montreal Football Club in Canada in 1868.

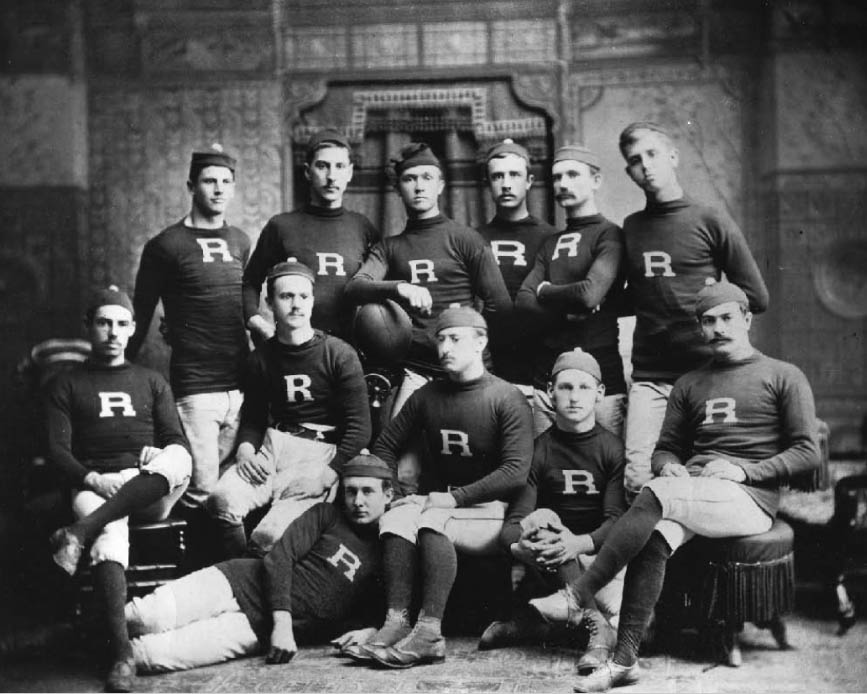
Rutgers University (here pictured in 1882) played the first inter-collegiate football game v Princeton in 1869.

On 6 November 1869, Rutgers faced Princeton in a game that was played with a round ball and, like all early games, used improvised rules. It is usually regarded as the first game of American intercollegiate football.

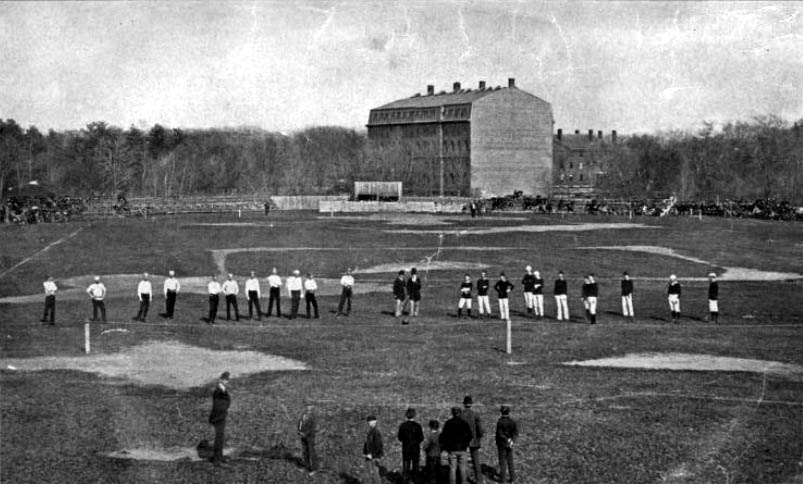
The Harvard v McGill game in 1874. It is considered the first rugby football game played in the United States.

Modern North American football grew out of a match between McGill University of Montreal and Harvard University in 1874. During the game, the two teams alternated between the rugby-based rules used by McGill and the Boston Game rules used by Harvard. Within a few years, Harvard had both adopted McGill's rules and persuaded other U.S. university teams to do the same. On 23 November 1876, representatives from Harvard, Yale, Princeton, and Columbia met at the Massasoit Convention in Springfield, Massachusetts, agreeing to adopt most of the Rugby Football Union rules, with some variations. In 1880, Yale coach Walter Camp, who had become a fixture at the Massasoit House conventions where the rules were debated and changed, devised a number of major innovations. Camp's two most important rule changes that diverged the American game from rugby were replacing the scrummage with the line of scrimmage and the establishment of the down-and-distance rules. American football still however remained a violent sport where collisions often led to serious injuries and sometimes even death. This led U.S. President Theodore Roosevelt to hold a meeting with football representatives from Harvard, Yale, and Princeton on 9 October 1905, urging them to make drastic changes. One rule change introduced in 1906, devised to open up the game and reduce injury, was the introduction of the legal forward pass. Though it was underused for years, this proved to be one of the most important rule changes in the establishment of the modern game. The debate about football injuries and fatalities also led to the creation of a national organisation to regulate college sports. Back in December 1905, 62 colleges and unis got together to chat about possible changes to the football rules, and on 31 March 1906, they officially set up the Intercollegiate Athletic Association of the United States. The organisation was renamed the National Collegiate Athletic Association (NCAA) in 1910.

Over the years, Canada absorbed some of the developments in American football in an effort to distinguish it from a more rugby-oriented game. In 1903, the Ontario Rugby Football Union adopted the Burnside rules, which implemented the line of scrimmage and down-and-distance system from American football, among others. Canadian football then implemented the legal forward pass in 1929. American and Canadian football remain different codes, stemming from rule changes that the American side of the border adopted but the Canadian side has not.

Professional American football grew in popularity throughout the mid to late 20th century. The National Football League (NFL) was founded in 1920, called "American Professional Football Association" (The name change came in 1922), and its rival, the American Football League (AFL), was founded in 1959. The two leagues agreed to merge in 1966, completing the merger in 1970. Even the footballs they used were the subject of rivalry. Wilson Sporting Goods has supplied the NFL with its official game balls since 1941, whereas the AFL used balls made by Spalding. At the first Super Bowl in 1967, the Green Bay Packers used Wilson's "The Duke", while the Kansas City Chiefs used Spalding's "J5-V". Each team used its own ball when in possession.

=== Gaelic football ===
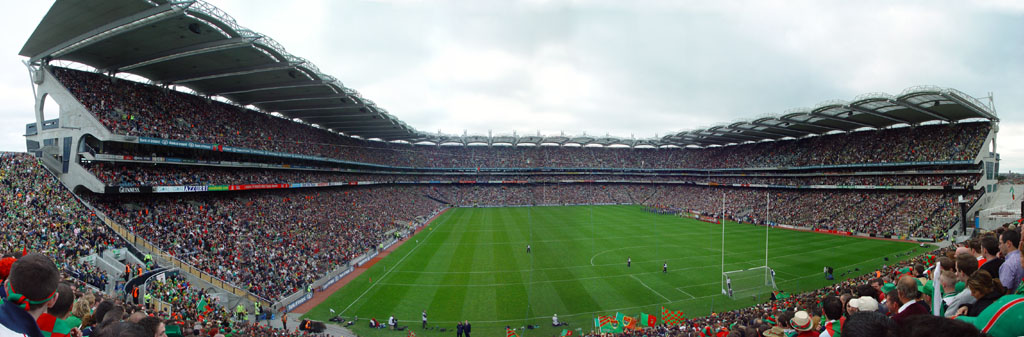
The All-Ireland Football Final in Croke Park, 2004

In the mid-19th century, various traditional football games, referred to collectively as caid, remained popular in Ireland, especially in County Kerry. One observer, Father W. Ferris, described two main forms of caid during this period: the "field game" in which the object was to put the ball through arch-like goals, formed from the boughs of two trees; and the epic "cross-country game" which took up most of the daylight hours of a Sunday on which it was played, and was won by one team taking the ball across a parish boundary. "Wrestling", "holding" opposing players, and carrying the ball were all allowed. By the 1870s, rugby and association football had started to become popular in Ireland. Trinity College Dublin was an early stronghold of rugby (see the Developments in the 1850s section above). The rules of the English FA were being distributed widely. Traditional forms of caid had begun to give way to a "rough-and-tumble game" which allowed tripping. There was no serious attempt to unify and codify Irish varieties of football, until the establishment of the Gaelic Athletic Association (GAA) in 1884. The GAA sought to promote traditional Irish sports, such as hurling and to reject imported games like rugby and association football. The first Gaelic football rules were drawn up by Maurice Davin and published in the United Ireland magazine on 7 February 1887. Davin's rules showed the influence of games such as hurling and a desire to formalise a distinctly Irish code of football. The prime example of this differentiation was the lack of an offside rule (an attribute which, for many years, was shared only by other Irish games like hurling, and by Australian rules football).

=== Schism in Rugby football ===
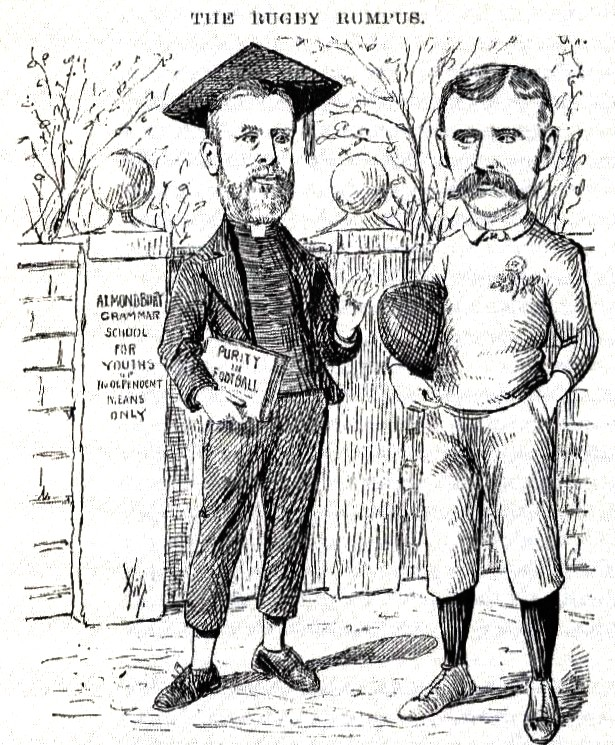
An English cartoon from the 1890s lampooning the divide in rugby football which led to the formation of rugby league. The caricatures are of Rev. Frank Marshall, an arch-opponent of player payments, and James Miller, a long-time opponent of Marshall. The caption reads: Marshall: "Oh, fie, go away naughty boy, I don't play with boys who can't afford to take a holiday for football any day they like!" Miller: "Yes, that's just you to a T; you'd make it so that no lad whose father wasn't a millionaire could play at all in a really good team. For my part I see no reason why the men who make the money shouldn't have a share in the spending of it."

The International Rugby Football Board (IRFB) was founded in 1886, but rifts were beginning to emerge in the code. Professionalism had already begun to creep into the various codes of football. In England, by the 1890s, a long-standing Rugby Football Union ban on professional players was causing regional tensions within rugby football, as many players in northern England were working class and could not afford to take time off to train, travel, play and recover from injuries. This was not very different from what had occurred ten years earlier in soccer in Northern England but the authorities reacted very differently in the RFU, attempting to alienate the working class support in Northern England. In 1895, following a dispute about a player being paid broken time payments, which replaced wages lost as a result of playing rugby, representatives of the northern clubs met in Huddersfield to form the Northern Rugby Football Union (NRFU). The new body initially permitted only various types of player wage replacements. However, within two years, NRFU players could be paid, but they were required to have a job outside sport. The demands of a professional league dictated that rugby had to become a better "spectator" sport. Within a few years the NRFU rules had started to diverge from the RFU, most notably with the abolition of the line-out. This was followed by the replacement of the ruck with the "play-the-ball ruck", which allowed a two-player ruck contest between the tackler at marker and the player tackled. Mauls were stopped once the ball carrier was held, being replaced by a play-the ball-ruck. The separate Lancashire and Yorkshire competitions of the NRFU merged in 1901, forming the Northern Rugby League, the first time the name rugby league was used officially in England. Over time, the RFU form of rugby, played by clubs which remained members of national federations affiliated to the IRFB, became known as rugby union.

=== Globalisation of association football ===
The need for a single body to oversee association football had become apparent by the beginning of the 20th century, with the increasing popularity of international fixtures. The English Football Association had chaired many discussions on setting up an international body, but was perceived as making no progress. It fell to associations from seven other European countries: France, Belgium, Denmark, Netherlands, Spain, Sweden, and Switzerland, to form an international association. The Fédération Internationale de Football Association (FIFA) was founded in Paris on 21 May 1904. Its first president was Robert Guérin. The French name and acronym has remained, even outside French-speaking countries.

=== Further divergence of the two rugby codes ===
Rugby league rules diverged significantly from rugby union in 1906, with the reduction of the team from 15 to 13 players. In 1907, a New Zealand professional rugby team toured Australia and Britain, receiving an enthusiastic response, and professional rugby leagues were launched in Australia the following year. However, the rules of professional games varied from one country to another, and negotiations between various national bodies were required to fix the exact rules for each international match. This situation endured until 1948, when at the instigation of the French league, the Rugby League International Federation (RLIF) was formed at a meeting in Bordeaux. During the second half of the 20th century, the rules changed further. In 1966, rugby league officials borrowed the American football concept of downs: a team was allowed to retain possession of the ball for four tackles (rugby union retains the original rule that a player who is tackled and brought to the ground must release the ball immediately). The maximum number of tackles was later increased to six (in 1971), and in rugby league this became known as the six tackle rule. With the advent of full-time professionals in the early 1990s, and the consequent speeding up of the game, the five-metre off-side distance between the two teams became 10 metres, and the replacement rule was superseded by various interchange rules, among other changes. The laws of rugby union also changed during the 20th century, although less significantly than those of rugby league. In particular, goals from marks were abolished, kicks directly into touch from outside the 22-metre line were penalised, new laws were put in place to determine who had possession following an inconclusive ruck or maul, and the lifting of players in line-outs was legalised. In 1995, rugby union became an "open" game, that is one which allowed professional players. Although the original dispute between the two codes has now disappeared – and despite the fact that officials from both forms of rugby football have sometimes mentioned the possibility of re-unification – the rules of both codes and their culture have diverged to such an extent that such an event is unlikely in the foreseeable future.

== Use of the word football ==
The word football, when used in reference to a specific game can mean any one of those described above. Because of this, much controversy has occurred over the term football, primarily because it is used in different ways in different parts of the English-speaking world. Most often, the word football is used to refer to the code of football that is considered dominant within a particular region (which is association football in most countries). So, effectively, what the word football means usually depends on where one says it.

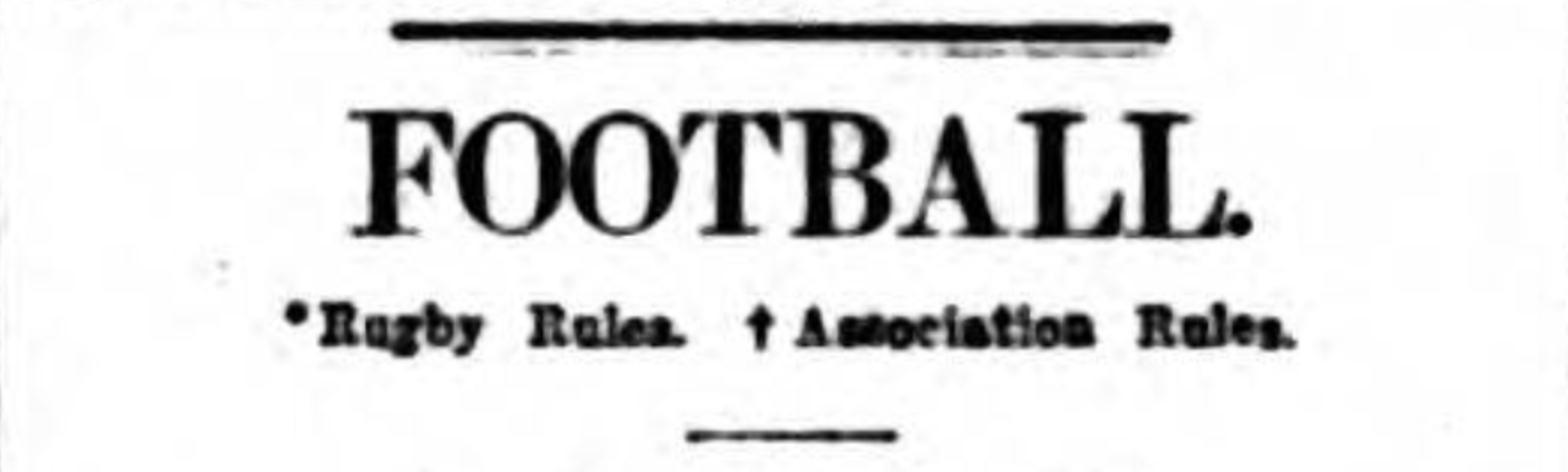
Heading from The Sportsman (London) front page of 25 November 1910, illustrating the continued use of the word "football" to encompass both association football and rugby

In each of the United Kingdom, the United States, and Canada, one football code is known solely as football, while the others generally require a qualifier. In New Zealand, football historically referred to rugby union, but more recently may be used unqualified to refer to association football. The sport meant by the word football in Australia is either Australian rules football or rugby league, depending on local popularity (which largely conforms to the Barassi Line). In francophone Quebec, where Canadian football is more popular, the Canadian code is known as le football while American football is known as le football américain and association football is known as le soccer. Of the 45 national FIFA (Fédération Internationale de Football Association) affiliates in which English is an official or primary language, most currently use Football in their organisations' official names; the FIFA affiliates in Canada and the United States use Soccer in their names. A few FIFA affiliates have recently "normalised" to using Football, including:

- Australia's association football governing body changed its name in 2005 from using soccer to football.
- New Zealand's governing body renamed itself in 2007, saying "the international game is called football".
- Samoa changed from "Samoa Football (Soccer) Federation" to "Football Federation Samoa" in 2009.

== Popularity ==
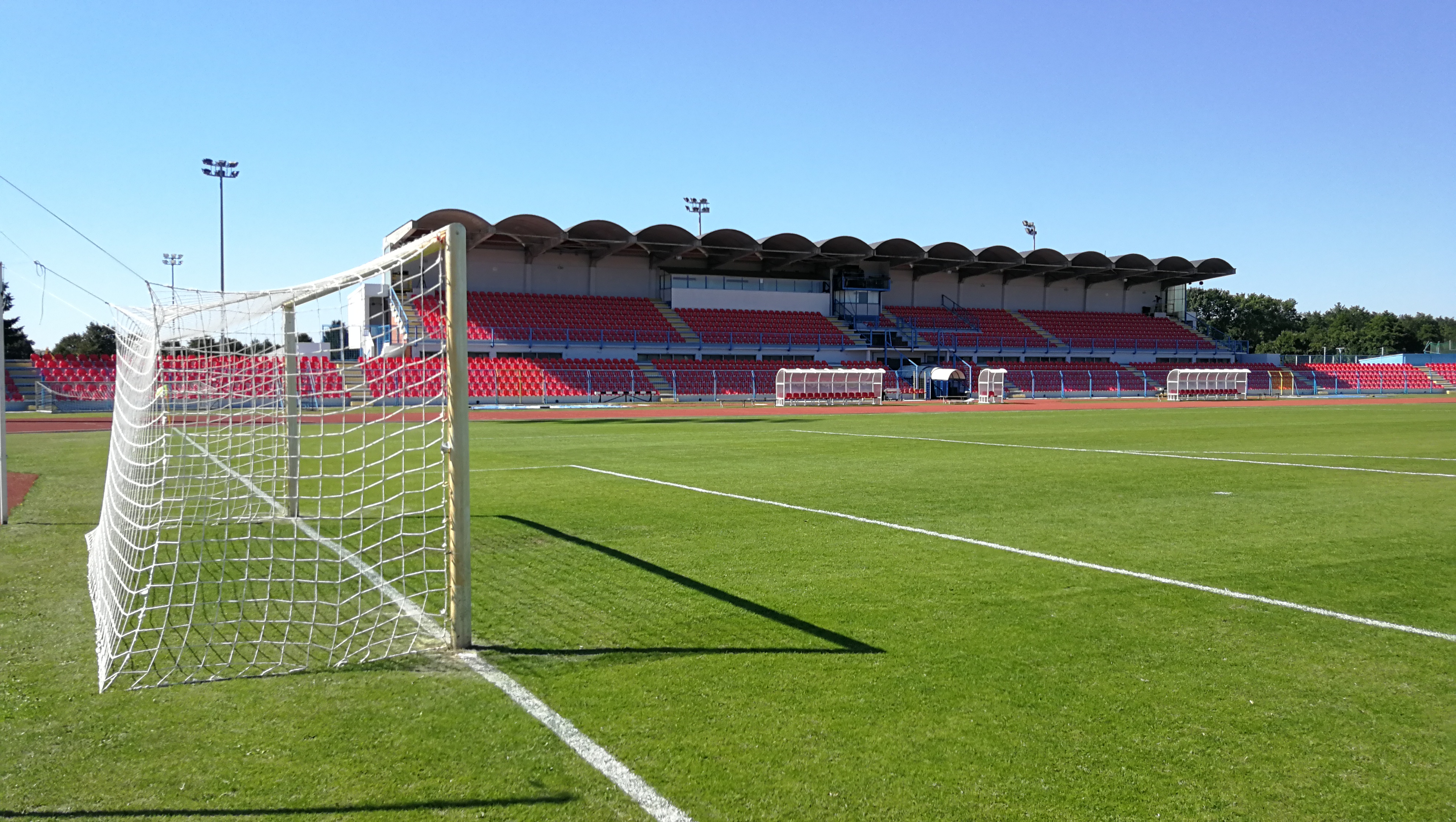
Small football stadium in Croatia

Several of the football codes are the most popular team sports in the world. Globally, association football is played by over 250 million players in over 200 nations, and has the highest television audience in sport, making it the most popular in the world. American football, with 1.1 million high school football players and nearly 70,000 college football players, is the most popular sport in the United States, with the annual Super Bowl game accounting for nine of the top ten of the most watched broadcasts in U.S. television history. The NFL has the highest average attendance (67,591) of any professional sports league in the world and has the highest revenue out of any single professional sports league. Thus, the best association football and American football players are among the highest paid athletes in the world. Australian rules football has the highest spectator attendance of all sports in Australia. Similarly, Gaelic football is the most popular sport in Ireland in terms of match attendance, and the All-Ireland Football Final is the most watched event of that nation's sporting year. Rugby union is the most popular sport in New Zealand, Samoa, Tonga, and Fiji. It is also the fastest growing sport in the U.S., with college rugby being the fastest growing college sport in that country.

== Football codes board ==
Medieval football	Cambridge rules (1848–1863)	Association football (1863–)	Futsal (1930–)	
Medieval football	Cambridge rules (1848–1863)	Association football (1863–)	Beach (1992–)	
Medieval football	Cambridge rules (1848–1863)	Association football (1863–)	Paralympic	
Medieval football	Sheffield rules (1857–1877)	Association football (1863–)	Indoor	
Medieval football	Sheffield rules (1857–1877)	Association football (1863–)	Street	
Medieval football	Rugby football (1845–) (Note: In 1845, the first rules of rugby were written by Rugby School pupils. But various rules of rugby had existed until the foundation of the Rugby Football Union in 1871.)	Burnside rules	Canadian football (1861–) (Note: In 1903, Burnside rules were introduced to Ontario Rugby Football Union, which transformed Canadian football from a rugby-style game to the gridiron-style game.)	Flag football (Note: There are Canadian rules Archived 21 November 2015 at the Wayback Machine established by Football Canada. Apart from this, there are also rules Archived 18 October 2015 at the Wayback Machine established by IFAF.)
Medieval football	Rugby football (1845–)	Rugby union with minor modifications	American football (1869 (Note: The first game of American football is widely cited as a game played on 6 November 1869, between two college teams, Rutgers and Princeton. But the game was played under rules based on the association football rules of the time. During the latter half of the 1870s, colleges playing association football switched to the Rugby code.)–)	Underwater (1967–), Indoor, Arena, Sprint, Flag, Touch, Street, Wheelchair (1987–), XFL
Medieval football	Rugby football (1845–)	Rugby Football Union (1871–)	Sevens (1883–), Tens, X, Touch, Tag, American flag, Mini, Beach, Snow, Tambo, Wheelchair, Underwater	
Medieval football	Rugby football (1845–)	Rugby Football Union (1871–)	Rugby league (1895–)	Nines
Medieval football	Rugby football (1845–)	Rugby Football Union (1871–)	Rugby league (1895–)	Sevens
Medieval football	Rugby football (1845–)	Rugby Football Union (1871–)	Rugby league (1895–)	Touch football, Tag, Wheelchair, Mod
Medieval football	Rugby rules and other English public school games (Note: Some historians support the theory that the primary influence was rugby football and other games emanating from English public schools. On the other hand, there are also historians who support the theory that Australian rules football and Gaelic Football have some common origins. See Origins of Australian rules football.)	Australian rules (1859–)	Rec footy, Auskick, Metro, Lightning, AFLX, Nine-a-side, Kick-to-kick	International rules football (1967–)
Medieval football	Gaelic football (1885–), Ladies' Gaelic football (1969–)			International rules football (1967–)

Association football variants
Rugby football variants
Gridiron football variants
Australian football variants

=== Football codes development tree ===
Football codes development tree

Football
Cambridge rules (1848–1863)	Sheffield rules (1857–1877)	Rugby football (1845–)	Rugby rules and other English public school games
Association football (1863–)	Rugby union with minor modifications	Burnside rules	Rugby Football Union (1871–)	Australian rules (1859–)	Gaelic (1887–)
American football (1869–)	Canadian football (1861–)	Rugby sevens (1883–)	Rugby league (1895–)	International Rules (1967–)
Futsal (1930–)	Flag football	Arena football (1987–)	Flag football (Canadian)	Rugby league sevens	Rugby league nines	Touch football
Beach soccer (1992–)	Indoor soccer	Paralympic football	Street football

== Present-day codes and families ==
Code			Association			Gridiron				Rugby		International and related		
Code			Soccer	Beach	Futsal	American	Flag	Indoor	Canadian	Union	League	Australian	International	Gaelic
Image														
Country of origin			England	Brazil	Uruguay	United States			Canada	England		Australia	Compromise rules between Australian and Gaelic codes	Ireland
Governing Body			FIFA			IFAF			Football Canada	World Rugby	IRL	AFL Commission	AFL and GAA	GAA
Pitch	Shape		Rectangular			Rectangular		Rounded rectangular	Rectangular	Rectangular		Oval	Rectangular	
Pitch	Total length		100–130 yards (91–119 m); 110–120 yards (100–110 m) (international)	35–37 metres	25–42 metres; 38–42 metres (international)	120 yards (110 m)	70 yards (64 m) (standard, 5 a side)	66 yards (60 m)	150 yards (140 m)	106–144 metres	112–122 metres	135–185 metres (professional)	145 metres	130–145 metres
Pitch	Total width		50–100 yards (46–91 m); 70–80 yards (64–73 m) (international)	26–28 metres	16–25 metres; 20–25 metres (international)	160 feet (49 m)	25 yards (23 m) (standard, 5 a side)	28 yards (26 m)	65 yards (59 m)	68–70 metres	68 metres	110–155 metres (professional)	90 metres	80–90 metres
Pitch	Surface		grass, artificial	sand	wood, artificial	grass, artificial	solid, sand	artificial	grass, artificial	grass, sand, clay, snow, artificial	grass	grass		
Pitch	Goalposts	Shape	Netted rectangular			Carving fork	None	Uppercase H, with bouncing nets/ Uppercase U (hanged)	Carving fork	Uppercase H		4 posts	Uppercase H (netted bottom) + 2 post	Uppercase H (netted bottom)
Pitch	Goalposts	Width	8 yards (7.3 m)	5.5 metres	3 metres	222 inches (5.6 m)	None	10 feet (3.0 m)	222 inches (5.6 m)	5.6 metres	5.5 metres	2 goal posts (6.4 metres apart) + 2 behind posts (6.4 metres apart from each side of goal post)		6.5 metres
Pitch	Goalposts	Height	8 feet (2.4 m)	2.2 metres	2 metres	10 feet (3.0 m) above ground	None	10 feet (3.0 m) above ground		3 metres above ground		Goal posts: 6–15 metres Behind posts: 3–10 metres	Goal posts: 6 metres, crossbar at 2.5 metres Behind posts: 3 metres	7 meters, crossbar at 2.5 meters, netted bottom 0.9 meters in depth
Equipment	Football	Shape	Sphere			Lemon				Prolate spheroid		Prolate spheroid	Sphere	
Equipment	Football	Circumference	27–28 inches (69–71 cm)	68–70 centimetres	62–64 centimetres	27.75–28.5 inches (70.5–72.4 cm) (longitudinal) × 20.75–21.25 inches (52.7–54.0 cm) (transversal)	27–28 inches (69–71 cm) (longitudinal) 20–21 inches (51–53 cm) (transversal)		27.75–28.5 inches (70.5–72.4 cm) (longitudinal) 20.75–21.375 inches (52.71–54.29 cm) (transversal)	74 – 77 centimetres (elliptic) × 58 – 62 centimetres (circular)		72 – 73 centimetres (elliptic) × 54.5 -55.5 centimetres (circular)	68–70 centimetres	
Equipment	Football	Diameter	–	–	–	10.875–11.4375 inches (27.623–29.051 cm) (longitudinal)	11–11.5 inches (28–29 cm) (longitudinal) 6.25–6.75 inches (15.9–17.1 cm) (transversal)		10.875–11.4375 inches (27.623–29.051 cm) (longitudinal) 6.25–6.75 inches (15.9–17.1 cm) (transversal)	28–30 centimetres (longitudinal)	–	–	–	
Equipment	Football	Weight	14–16 ounces (400–450 g)	400–440 grams		14–15 ounces (400–430 g)				410 – 460 grams			480–500 grams	
Equipment	Football	Pressure	8.5–15.6 pounds per square inch (59–108 kPa)	0.4–0.6 standard atmospheres (41–61 kPa)	0.6–0.9 standard atmospheres (61–91 kPa)	12.5–13.5 pounds per square inch (86–93 kPa)				9.5–10 pounds per square inch (66–69 kPa)		69 kilopascals	9–10 pounds per square inch (62–69 kPa)	
Equipment	Football	Bounce			50–65 centimetres when dropped from 2 metres								0.5222–0.576 e when dropped from 1.8 metres	
Equipment	Uniform	Non protective	Shirt with sleeves, shorts, socks, footwear	Shirt with sleeves, shorts, no footwear allowed	Shirt with sleeves, shorts, socks, footwear	Jersey, pants, socks	Jersey, shorts or pants, flag belts	Jersey, pants, socks, footwear		Shirt, shorts, socks, footwear		Sleeveless shirt, shorts, socks, footwear	Shirt with sleeves, shorts, socks, footwear	
Equipment	Uniform	Protective gear	Shin guards	None	Shin guards	Helmet, hip pads, knee pads, mouthguard, shoulder pads, thigh guards	Mouthguard (recommended)	Helmet, hip pads, knee pads, mouthguard, shoulder pads, thigh guards		Optional (headgear, padded clothes, mouthguard, shin guards, goggles)				Mouthguard
Players	Number		11	5		11	5	8	12	15	13	18	15	
Players	Goalkeeper		Yes			No				No		No	Yes	
Time	Duration		2 × 45 minutes	3 × 12 minutes	2 × 20 minutes	4 × 15 minutes	2 × 20 minutes	4 × 15 minutes		2 × 40 minutes		4 × 20 minutes	4 × 18 minutes	2 × 35 minutes
Time	Clock stoppage		No	Yes		Yes				Yes		Yes		No
Kicking	Type of kicks		Off the ground, bicycle, placed, dribbling			Placed, punt	None	Placed	Placed, punt	Off the ground, grubber, dropped, bomb, punt, placed		Off the ground, grubber, bomb, punt		Off the ground, grubber, bomb, dropped, punt, bicycle
Kicking	Kickoff		Yes			Yes	None	Yes		Yes		No		
Use of hands			Only goalkeeper, but all in throw-in		Only goalkeeper	Yes				Yes		Yes		
Forward pass			Yes			Yes				No		Yes		
Offside rule			Yes	No		Yes				Yes		No		
Type of tackles			Sliding, standing			Spear, dump, body tackle, ankle tap, diving, bumping, shoulder charge, intercept ball, chicken wig	None	Spear, dump, body tackle, ankle tap, diving, bumping, shoulder charge, intercept ball, chicken wig		Dump, body tackle, ankle tap, diving, charge down		Dump, diving, bumping, intercept ball, spoil, shepherd, smother		
Score			Goal 1			Touchdown 6, Field goal 3, try 1 or 2, Safety 2	Touchdown 6, try 1 or 2, safety 2, defence touchdown on a try 2	Touchdown 6, Field goal 3 or 4 (drop kick), try 1 or 2, Safety 2, defence touchdown on a try 2, Rouge 1, Deuce 2	Touchdown 6, Field goal 3, Convert 1 or 2, Safety 2, Single 1	Try 5, Conversion 2, Penalty 3, Drop goal 3	Try 4, Conversion 2, Penalty 2, Drop goal 1 (2 points when kicked from 40m+)	Goal 6, behind 1	Goal 6, over 3, behind 1	Goal 3, over 1 (2 points when kicked from outside 40 m arc)
Methods for breaking ties			Knock-out contests: extratime, penaltyshot-out			Extra periods				Extratime (knock-out contests)				Extratime
Methods for starting play	partials		Kick-off			Kickoff (each half)	Scrimmage			Kick off	Kick off	By umpire: ball-up	By umpire: central throw up	
Methods for starting play	After scoring		Kick-off			After touchdown: scrimmage for try; After try, field goal or safety: kickoff				Restart kick	Kick off	Goal: ball-up Behind: kick in	Goal: central throw up; Behind and over: kicked into play by the Goalkeeper, from inside the 13 m rectangle	Kick out
Methods for starting play	when ball goes out of bounds		Touchlines: throw-in; Goal lines: goal kick (by defending team), corner kick (by attacking team)	Touchlines: throw-in or kick-in	Touchlines: kick-in	Scrimmage				Touch: lineout or quick throw	Touchlines: scrum	Free kick or throw in (by umpire)	Sidelines: free kick; Endlines: free kick (within 13 m rectangle by defending team) or on the nearest 45 m line (by attacking team)	Sidelines: free kick from the hand from outside; Endlines: Kick out (by defending team), free kick on the nearest 45 m line (by attacking team)
Methods for starting play	when ball goes out of bounds		Touchlines: throw-in; Goal lines: goal kick (by defending team), corner kick (by attacking team)	Goal lines: goal clearance (by defending team), corner kick (by attacking team)		Scrimmage				Touch: lineout or quick throw	Touchlines: scrum	Free kick or throw in (by umpire)	Sidelines: free kick; Endlines: free kick (within 13 m rectangle by defending team) or on the nearest 45 m line (by attacking team)	Sidelines: free kick from the hand from outside; Endlines: Kick out (by defending team), free kick on the nearest 45 m line (by attacking team)
Methods for starting play	After foul		Free kick, penalty kick							Scrum, penalty kick		Free kick	Free kick, penalty kick	Free kick, throw in, penalty kick
Tournaments	World nation championship		Yes			Yes		No		Yes		Yes	No (only Australia vs Ireland)	No
Tournaments	Olympic		Yes	No	2018, 2026 (SYOG)	1932 (demonstration)	2028	No		1900, 1908, 1920, 1924 (sevens since 2016)	No	1956 (demonstration)	No	
Tournaments	World Games		No			Invitational (2005 and 2017)	Yes	No		Sevens (2001–2013)	No	No		
Tournaments	Professional leagues		Yes			Yes	No	Yes		Yes		Yes	No	No (strictly amateur)

Pitch size comparisons

Size comparison of modern football codes playing fields

Soccer

American and Arena football
Goalposts

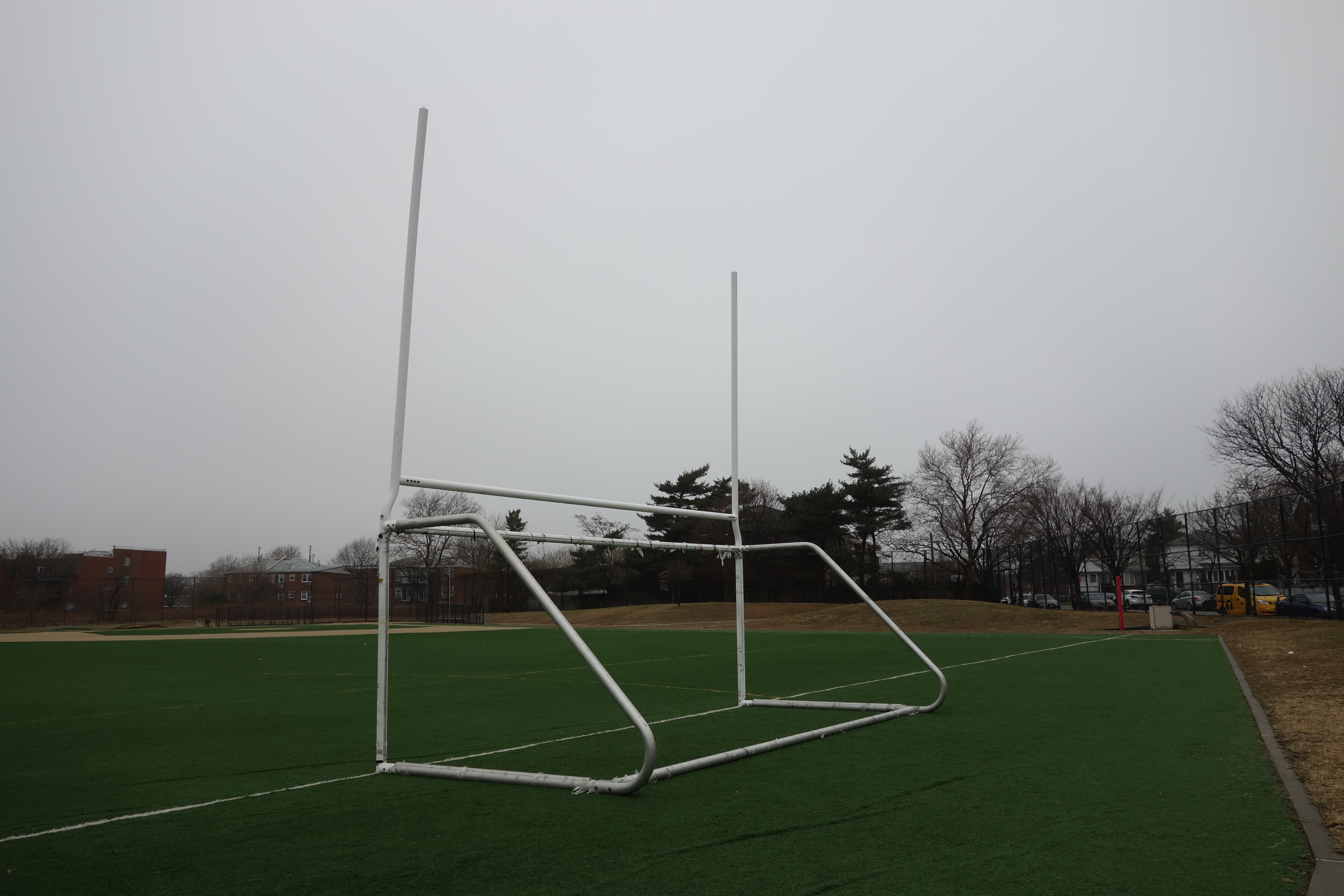
Multipurpose soccer and American football

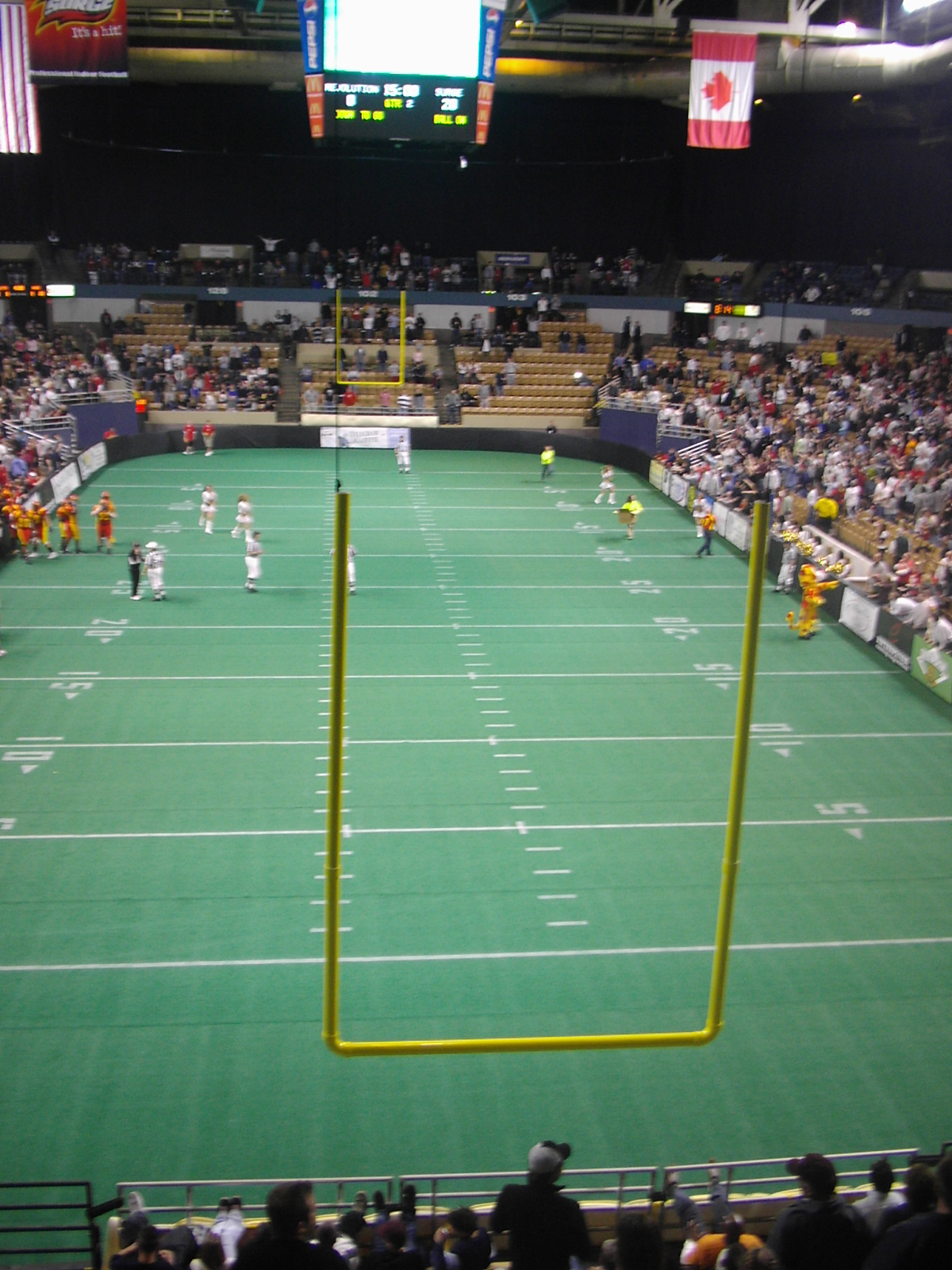
Arena football

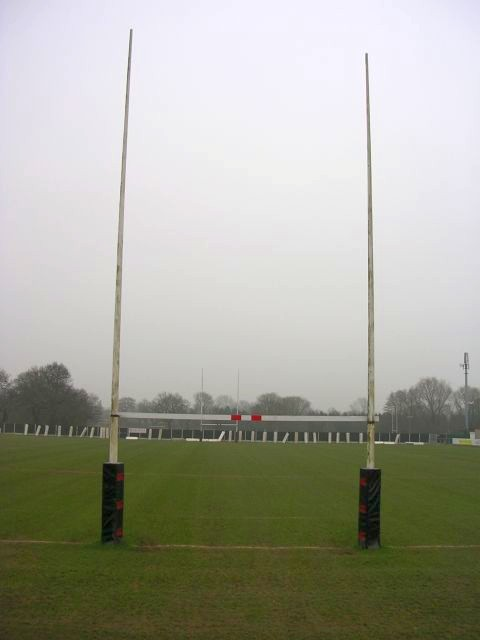
Rugby football

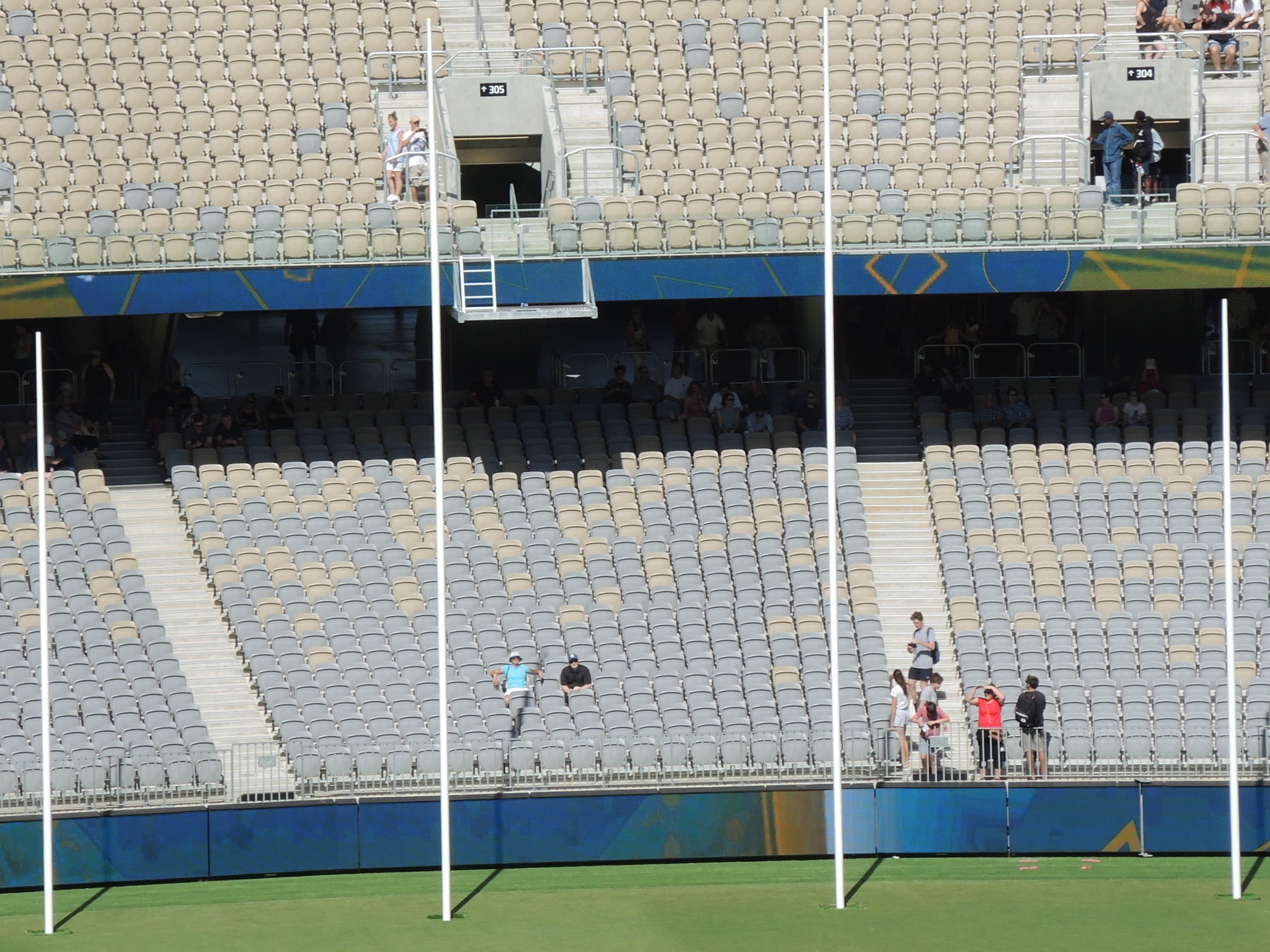
Australian rules football

Gaelic football
Ball

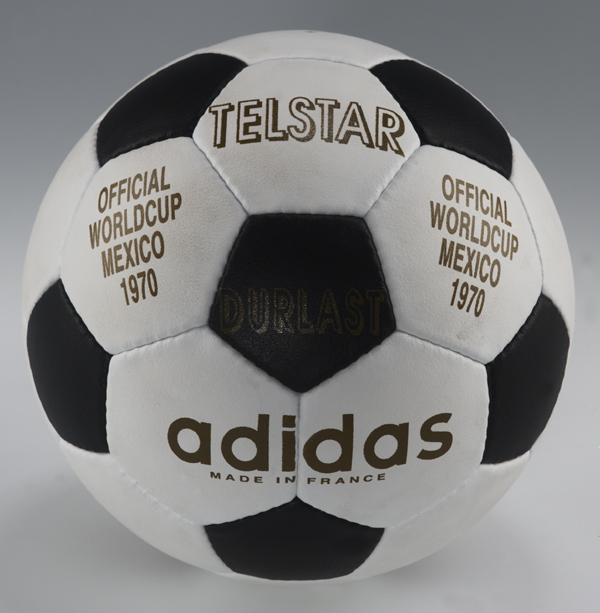
Soccer

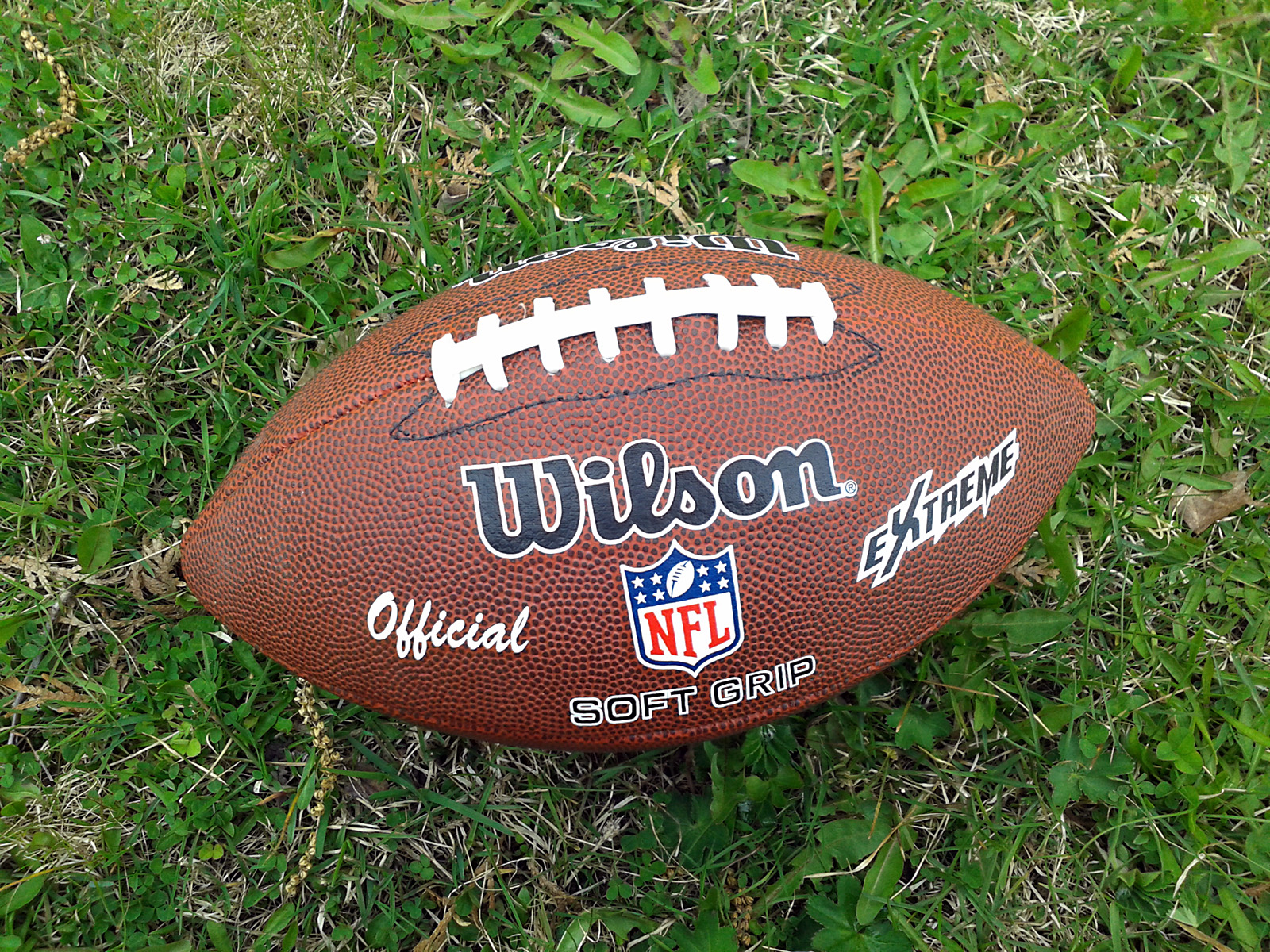
Gridiron football

Rugby football

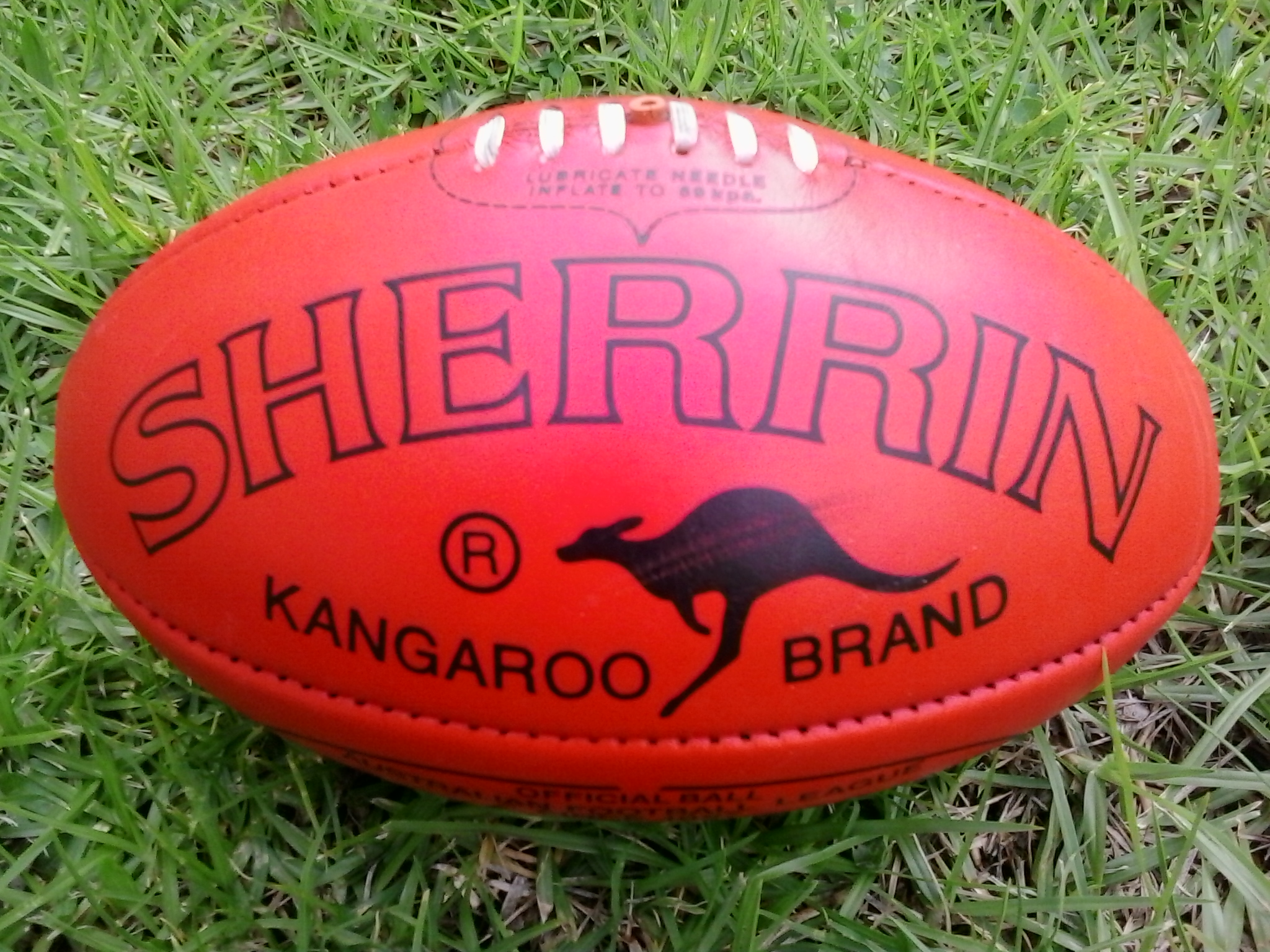
Australian football

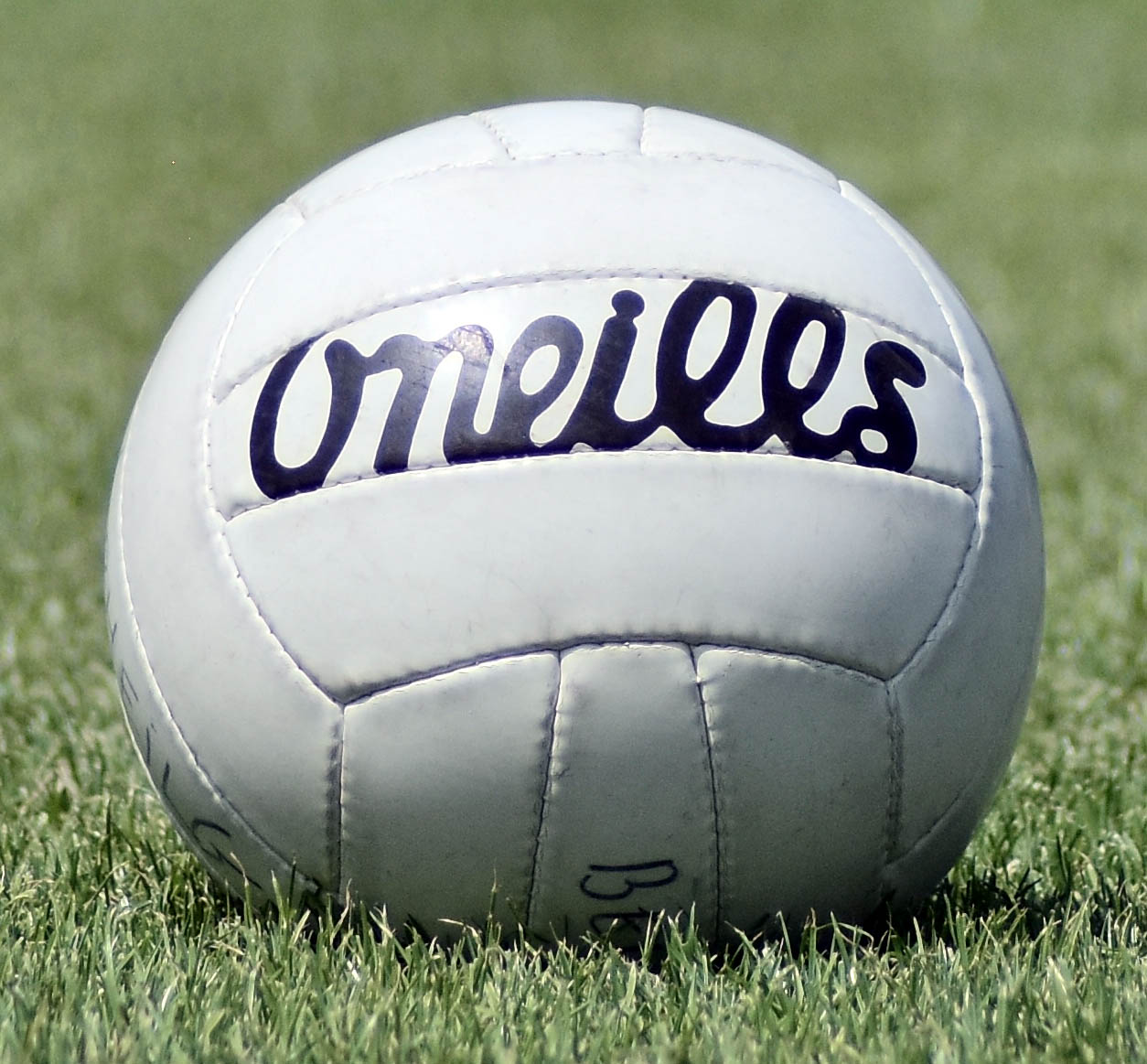
Gaelic football

=== Association ===
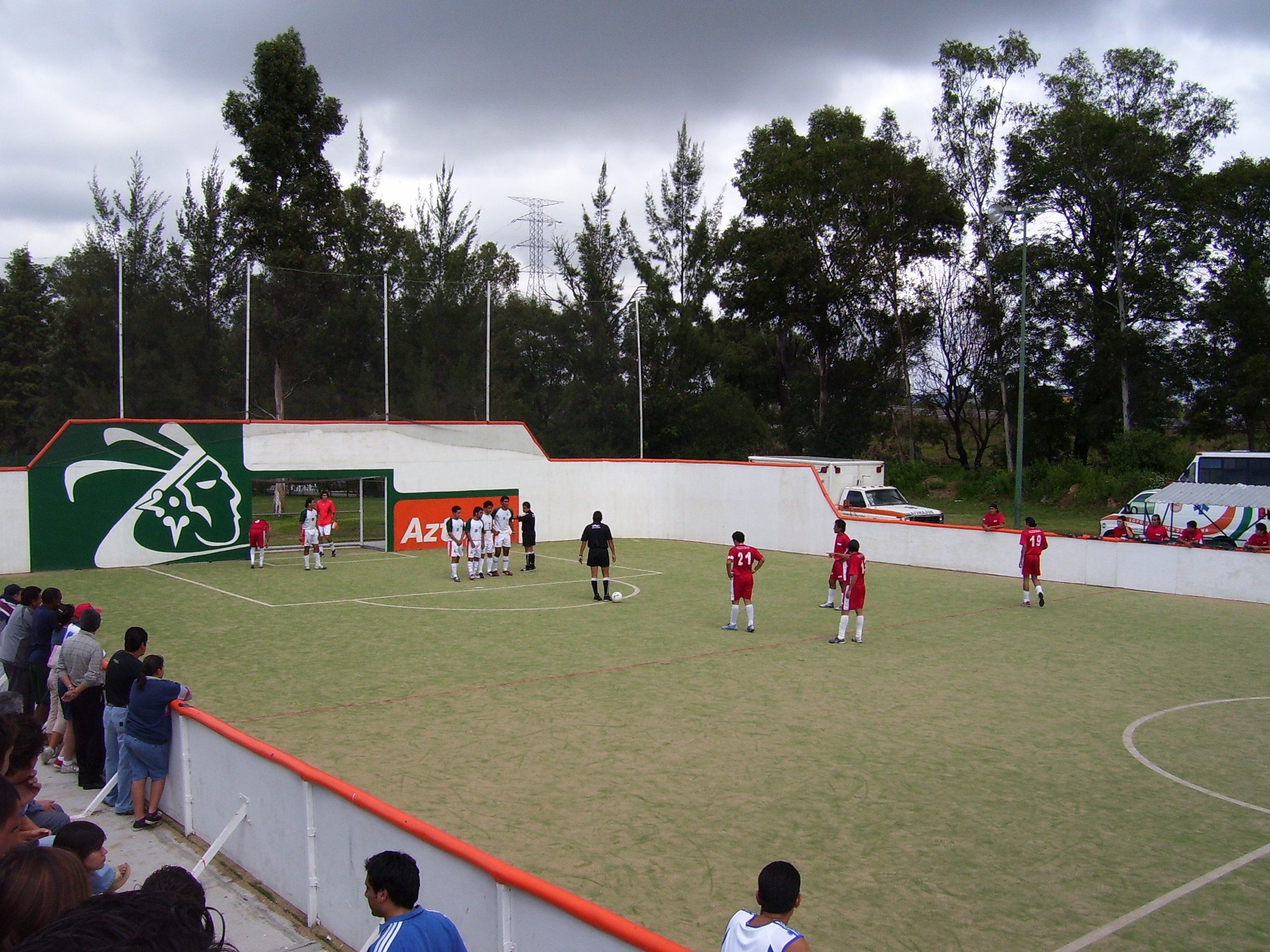
An indoor soccer game at an open-air venue in Mexico. The referee has just awarded the red team a free kick.

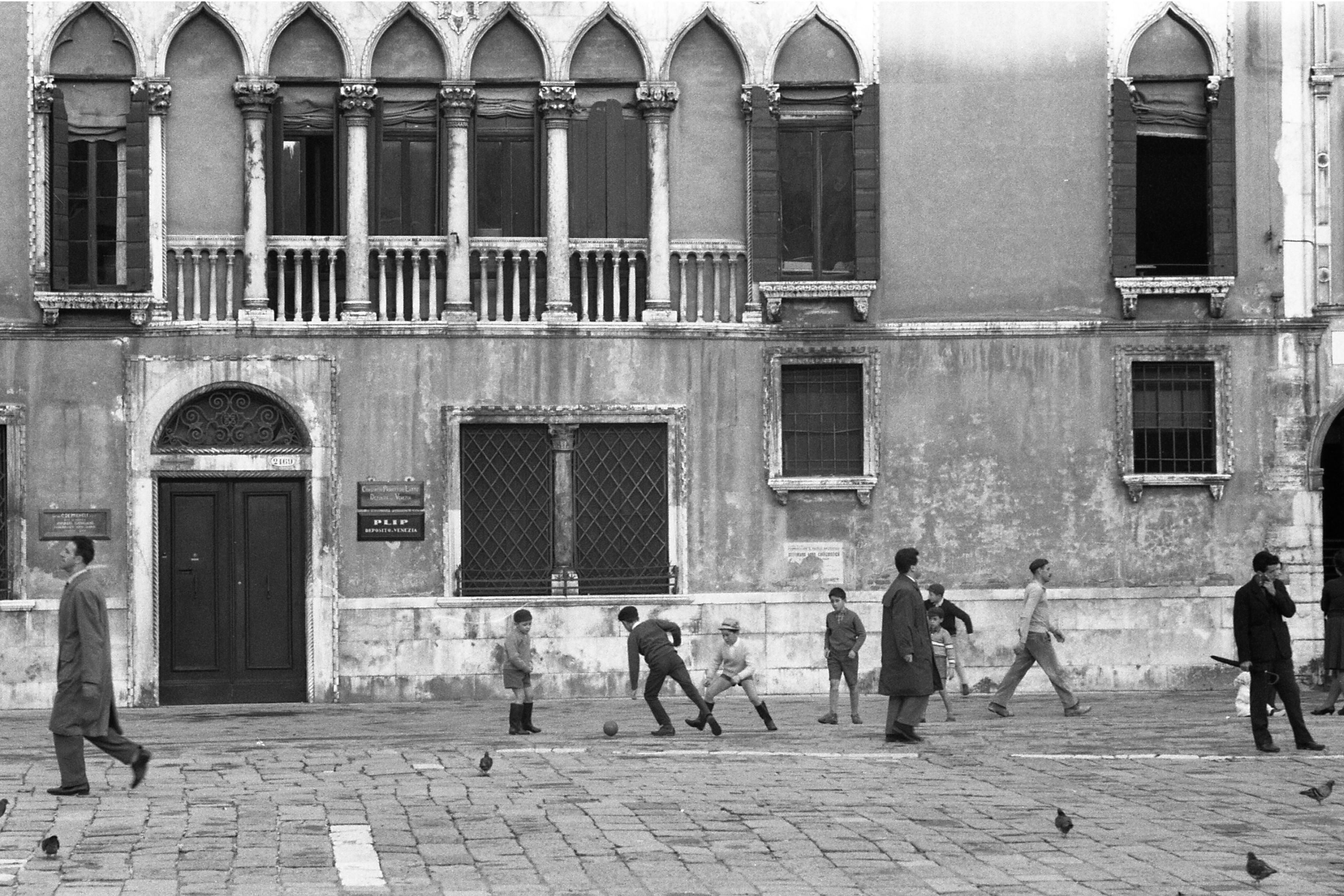
Street football, Venice (1960)

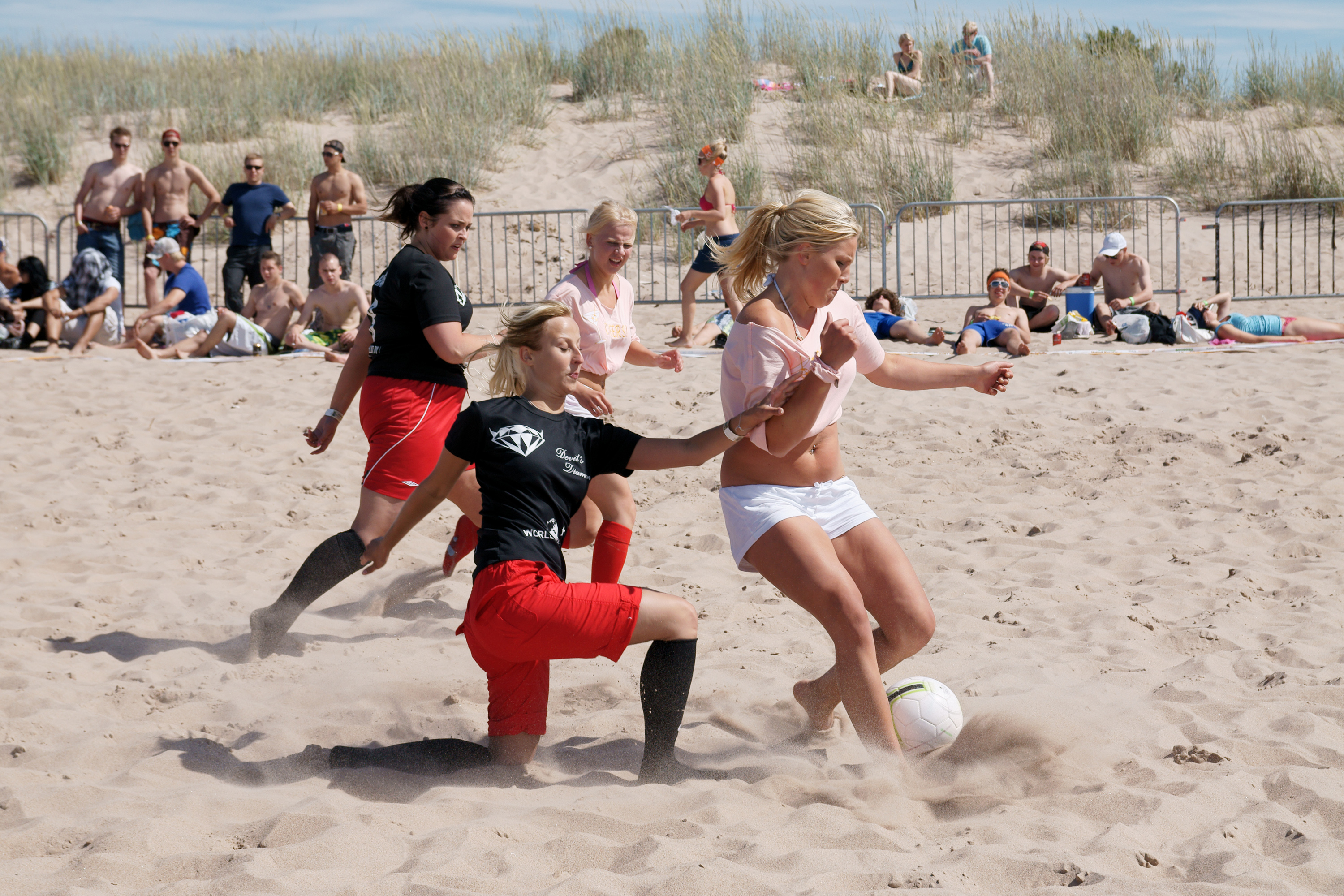
Women's beach soccer game at YBF 2010 in Yyteri Beach, Pori, Finland

These codes have in common the prohibition of the use of hands (by all players except the goalkeeper, though outfield players can "throw-in" the ball when it goes out of play), unlike other codes where carrying or handling the ball by all players is allowed

- Association football, also known as football, soccer, footy and footie
- Indoor/basketball court variants:
  - Five-a-side football – game for smaller teams, played under various rules including:
    - Futsal – the FIFA-approved five-a-side indoor game
    - Minivoetbal – the five-a-side indoor game played in East and West Flanders where it is extremely popular
    - Papi fut – the five-a-side game played in outdoor basketball courts (built with goals) in Central America.
  - Indoor soccer – the six-a-side indoor game, the Latin American variant (fútbol rápido, "fast football") is often played in open-air venues
  - Masters Football – six-a-side played in Europe by mature professionals (35 years and older)
- Paralympic football – modified game for athletes with a disability. Includes:
  - Football 5-a-side – for visually impaired athletes
  - Football 7-a-side – for athletes with cerebral palsy
  - Amputee football – for athletes with amputations
  - Deaf football – for athletes with hearing impairments
  - Powerchair football – for athletes in electric wheelchairs
- Beach soccer, beach football or sand soccer – variant modified for play on sand
- Street football – encompasses a number of informal variants
- Rush goalie – a variation in which the role of the goalkeeper is more flexible than normal
- Crab football – players stand on their hands and feet and move around on their backs whilst playing
- Swamp soccer – the game as played on a swamp or bog field
- Jorkyball
- Walking football – players are restricted to walking, to facilitate participation by older and less mobile players
- Rushball

=== Rugby ===
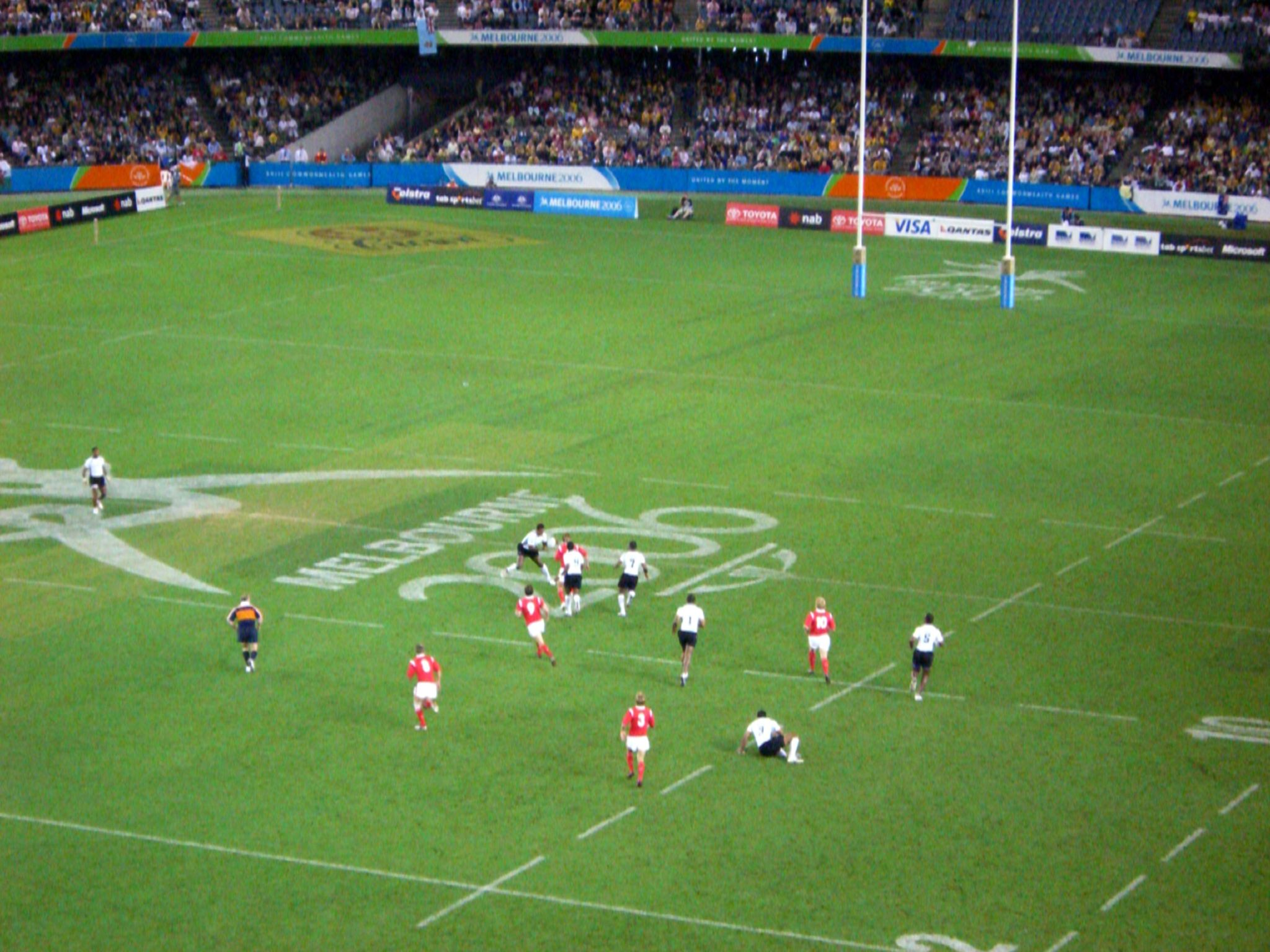
Rugby sevens; Fiji v Wales at the 2006 Commonwealth Games in Melbourne

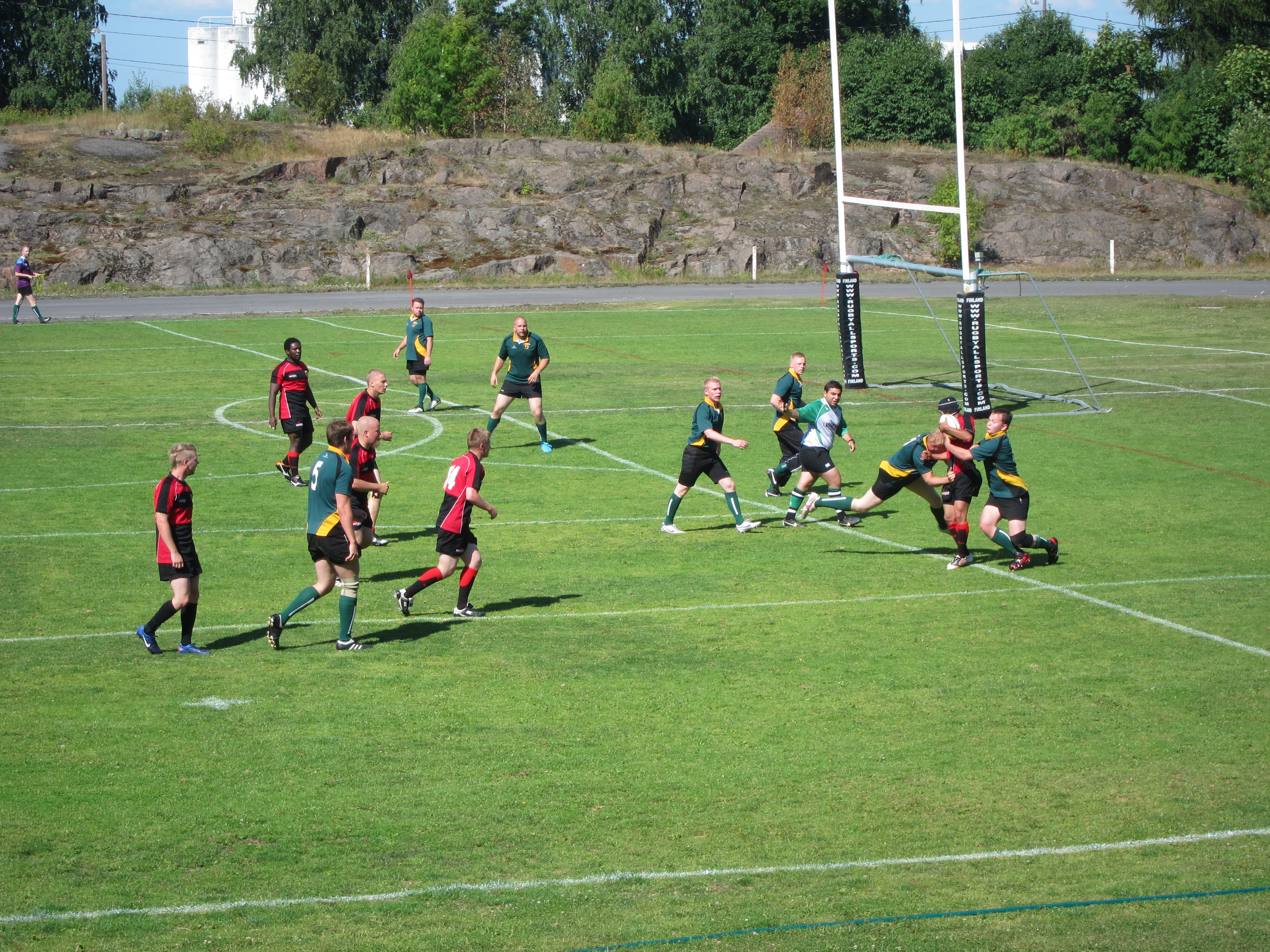
Griffins RFC Kotka, the rugby union team from Kotka, Finland, playing in the Rugby-7 Tournament in 2013

These codes have in common the ability of players to carry the ball with their hands, and to throw it to teammates, unlike association football where the use of hands during play is prohibited by anyone except the goalkeeper. They also feature various methods of scoring based upon whether the ball is carried into the goal area, or kicked above the goalposts. They are broadly divided into two families: The Rugby codes are notable for a prohibition on passing the ball forwards with the hands

- Rugby football
  - Rugby union
    - Mini rugby a variety for children.
    - Rugby sevens and Rugby tens – variants for teams of reduced size.
  - Rugby league – often referred to simply as "league", and usually known simply as "football" or "footy" in the Australian states of New South Wales and Queensland.
    - Touch, non-contact
    - Rugby league sevens and Rugby league nines – variants for teams of reduced size.
  - Beach rugby – rugby played on sand
  - Touch rugby – generic name for forms of rugby football which do not feature tackles.
  - Tag Rugby – non-contact variant in which a flag attached to a player is removed to indicate a tackle.

Gridiron codes share a history with rugby codes, but allow some forward passing

- Gridiron football
  - American football – called "football" in the United States and Canada, and "gridiron" in Australia and New Zealand.
    - Nine-man football, eight-man football, six-man football – variants played primarily by smaller high schools that lack enough players to field full teams.
    - Street football/backyard football – played without equipment or official fields and with simplified rules
    - Flag football – non-contact variant in which a flag attached to a player is removed to indicate a tackle.
    - Touch football – non-tackle variants
  - Canadian football – called simply "football" in Canada; "football" in Canada can mean either Canadian or American football depending on context. All of the variants listed for American football are also attested for Canadian football.
  - Indoor football – indoor variants, particularly arena football
  - Wheelchair football – variant adapted to play by athletes with physical disabilities

=== Irish and Australian ===
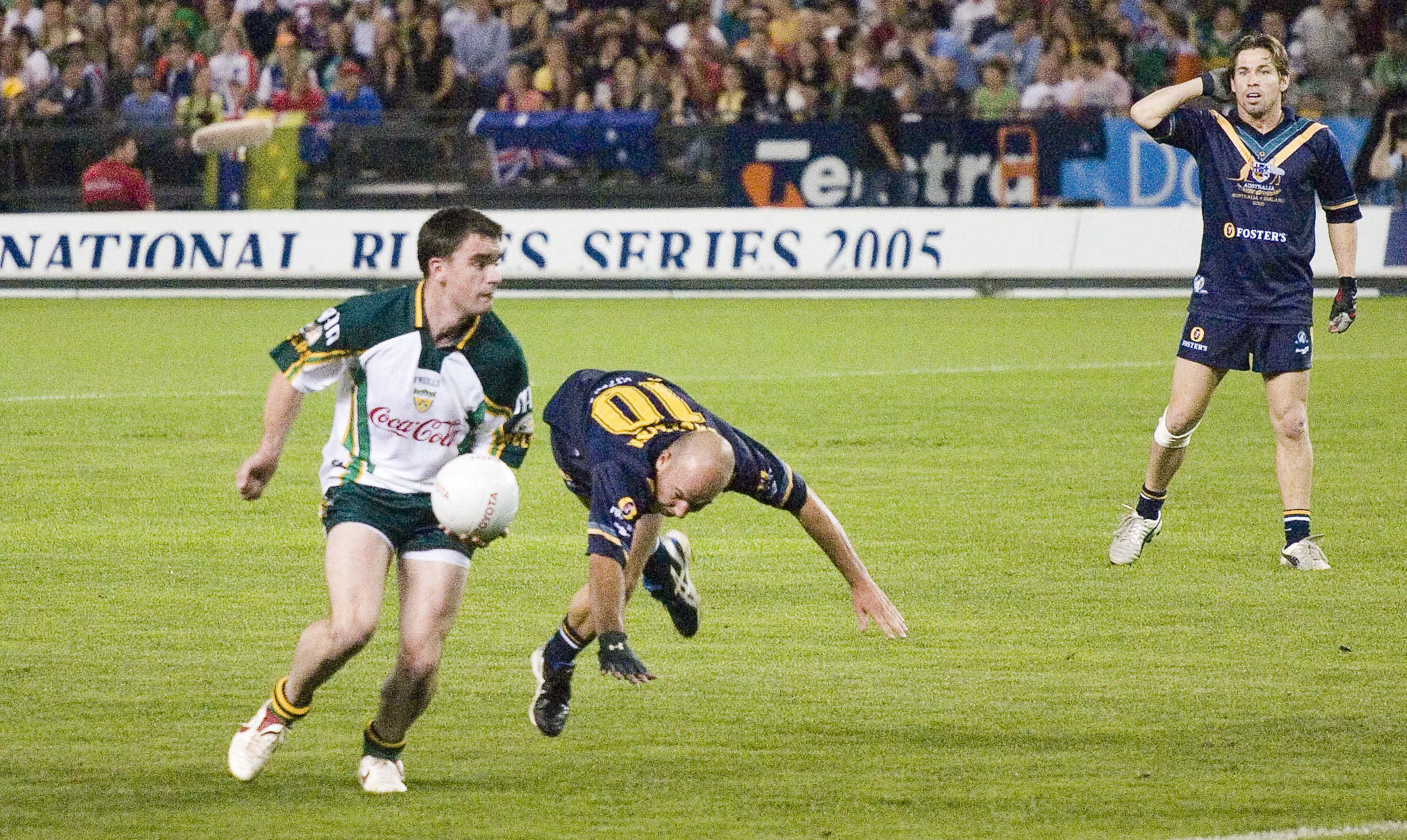
International rules football test match from the 2005 International Rules Series between Australia and Ireland at Telstra Dome, Melbourne, Australia

These codes have in common the absence of a full offside rule and the subsequent man-to-man nature of defending, the prohibition of continuous carrying of the ball (requiring a periodic bounce or solo (toe-kick), depending on the code) while running, handpassing by punching or tapping the ball rather than throwing it, a major and minor scoring system, and other traditions.

- Australian rules football – officially known as "Australian football", and informally as "football", "footy" or "Aussie rules". In some areas it is referred to as "AFL", the name of the main organising body and competition
  - Auskick – a version of Australian rules designed by the AFL for young children
  - Metro footy (or Metro rules footy) – a modified version invented by the USAFL, for use on gridiron fields in North American cities (which often lack grounds large enough for conventional Australian rules matches)
  - Kick-to-kick – informal versions of the game
  - 9-a-side footy – a more open, running variety of Australian rules, requiring 18 players in total and a proportionally smaller playing area (includes contact and non-contact varieties)
  - Rec footy – "Recreational Football", a modified non-contact variation of Australian rules, created by the AFL, which replaces tackles with tags
  - Touch Aussie Rules – a non-tackle variation of Australian Rules played only in the United Kingdom
  - Samoa rules – localised version adapted to Samoan conditions, such as the use of rugby football fields
  - Masters Australian football (a.k.a. Superules) – reduced contact version introduced for competitions limited to players over 30 years of age
  - Women's Australian rules football – women's competition played with a smaller ball and (sometimes) reduced contact
- Gaelic football – Played predominantly in Ireland, and abroad by players of Irish extraction or heritage. Commonly referred to as "football", "GAA" or "Gaelic"
  - Ladies Gaelic football
- International rules football – a compromise code used for international representative matches between AFL and GAA for Australian rules football players and Gaelic football players

=== Recent and hybrid ===
- Keepie uppie (keep up) – the art of juggling with a football using the feet, knees, chest, shoulders, and head.
  - Footbag – several variations using a small bean bag or sand bag as a ball, the trade marked term hacky sack is sometimes used as a generic synonym.
  - Freestyle football – participants are graded for their entertainment value and expression of skill.

==== Association ====
- Three sided football
- Triskelion

==== Rugby ====
- Forceback a.k.a. forcing back, forcemanback

==== Hybrid ====
- Austus – a compromise between Australian rules and American football, invented in Melbourne during World War II.
- Speedball – a combination of American football, soccer, and basketball, devised in the United States in 1912.
- Universal football – a hybrid of Australian rules and rugby league, trialled in Sydney in 1933.
- Volata – a game resembling association football and European handball, devised by Italian fascist leader, Augusto Turati, in the 1920s.
- Wheelchair rugby – also known as Murderball, invented in Canada in 1977. Based on ice hockey and basketball rather than rugby.
- Underwater football – played in a pool, and the ball can only be played when underwater. The ball can be carried as in rugby.
- Roller soccer, a version of association football played on skates.

More distant sports:

- Cycle ball – a sport similar to association football played on bicycles.
- Motoball, motorcycle team sport similar to association Football.
- The hockey game bandy has rules partly based on the association football rules and is sometimes nicknamed as 'winter football'.

===== Non goal sports =====
- Net and wall sports
  - Bossaball – mixes association football and volleyball and gymnastics; played on inflatables and trampolines.
  - Football tennis – mixes association football and tennis.
  - Footvolley – mixes association football and beach volleyball; played on sand.

Although similar to football and volleyball in some aspects, Sepak takraw has ancient origins and cannot be considered a hybrid game. Teqball, however, which derives some of its rules and traditions from Sepak takraw, also has hybrid elements.

- Others
  - Footgolf – golf played by kicking an association football.
  - Kickball – a hybrid of association football and baseball, invented in the United States about 1942.

=== Historical codes still played ===
==== Medieval ====
- Calcio Fiorentino – a modern revival of Renaissance football from 16th century Florence.
- la Soule – a modern revival of French medieval football
- lelo burti – a Georgian traditional football game

===== Britain =====
- The Haxey Hood, played on Epiphany in Haxey, Lincolnshire
- Shrove Tuesday games
  - Scoring the Hales in Alnwick, Northumberland
  - Royal Shrovetide Football in Ashbourne, Derbyshire
  - The Shrovetide Ball Game in Atherstone, Warwickshire
  - The Shrove Tuesday Football Ceremony of the Purbeck Marblers in Corfe Castle, Dorset
  - Hurling the Silver Ball at St Columb Major in Cornwall
  - The Ball Game in Sedgefield, County Durham
- In Scotland the Ba game ("Ball Game") is still popular around Christmas and Hogmanay at:
  - Duns, Berwickshire
  - Scone, Perthshire
  - Kirkwall in the Orkney Islands

==== British schools ====
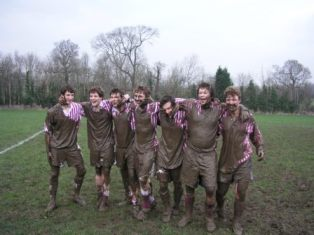
Harrow football players after a game at Harrow School (c. 2005)

Games still played at UK public (private) schools:

- Eton field game
- Eton wall game
- Rugby football
- Harrow football
- Winchester College football

=== Tabletop games, video games, and other recreations ===
==== Based on association football ====
- Blow football
- Button football – also known as Futebol de Mesa, Jogo de Botões
- Fantasy football
- FIFA Video Games Series
- Lego Football
- Mario Strikers
- Penny football
- Pro Evolution Soccer
- Subbuteo
- Table football – also known as foosball, table soccer, babyfoot, bar football or gettone

==== Based on American football ====
- Blood Bowl
- Fantasy football (American)
- Madden NFL
- Paper football

==== Based on Australian football ====
- AFL video game series
  - List of AFL video games

==== Based on rugby league football ====
- Australian Rugby League
- Sidhe's Rugby League series
  - Rugby League 3

== See also ==
- 1601 to 1725 in sports: Football
- Football field (unit of length)
- List of types of football
- List of players who have converted from one football code to another
- Names for association football
- American football in the United States
- List of largest sports contracts
