= List of types of football =

This is a list of variants of football, including most variations of gridiron, rugby and association football.

== Association football variants ==
- Association football, also known as "soccer".
- 3v3 Soccer
- Five-a-side football – played under various rules, including:
  - Futsal - the FIFA-approved five-a-side indoor game.
  - Beach soccer – played on sand, governed by FIFA.
- Indoor soccer – six-a-side indoor game played in North America.
- Seven-a-side football – a variation of minifootball.
  - Sevens football – a version played in India.
- Paralympic football – modified for disabled competitors.
  - Amputee football
  - Blind football (5-a-side)
  - Cerebral palsy football (7-a-side)
  - Powerchair football and wheelchair soccer
- Crab football
- Jorkyball
- Keepie uppie – the art of juggling a football using feet, knees, chest, shoulders, and head.
  - Footbag or hacky sack – using a small bean bag or sand bag as a ball.
  - Freestyle football – a modern take on keepie uppie where freestylers are graded for their entertainment value and expression of skill.
- Rush goalie – the role of the goalkeeper is more flexible than normal.
- Street football – a number of informal varieties.
- Swamp football
- Three-sided football
  - Omegaball (three 5-a-side teams in simultaneous competition with each other on a circular field)
- Walking football

=== With elements of other sports ===
- Motoball
- Roller soccer
- Football tennis
- Footvolley
- Teqball
- Bandy hockey game partly based on association football, sometimes nicknamed "winter football".

== Rugby football variants ==
- Rugby football – the game which split into rugby union and rugby league.
  - Rugby league
    - Rugby league sevens
    - Rugby league nines
    - Touch football – a form of rugby league without tackles.
    - Tag rugby – a form of rugby league, but a velcro tag must be taken to indicate a tackle.
    - Wheelchair rugby league
  - Rugby union
    - Rugby sevens
    - Beach rugby – rugby played on sand.
    - Wheelchair rugby or quad rugby
- Gridiron football
  - American football – called "football" in the United States, and "gridiron" or "gridiron football" in Australia.
    - Arena football – indoor American football.
    - Touch football (American) – non-tackle American football.
      - Flag football – non-tackle American football, like touch football but a token must be taken to indicate a tackle.
  - Canadian football – called "football" in Canada.
    - Canadian flag football – non-tackle Canadian football.

== Gaelic and Australian rules ==
- Gaelic football – called "football" in Ireland.
- Australian rules football – called "football" in much of Australia.
  - Auskick – a version of Australian rules designed for young children.
- International rules football – a compromise code used for games between Gaelic and Australian rules players.
- Austus – a compromise between Australian rules and American football, invented in Melbourne during World War II.

== Surviving English public school games ==
- Eton field game
- Eton wall game
- Harrow football
- Winchester College football

== Surviving medieval ball games ==
- Traditional Shrove Tuesday matches in the United Kingdom – annual town- or village-wide football games with their own rules are played at:
  - Alnwick in Northumberland
  - Ashbourne in Derbyshire (known as Royal Shrovetide Football)
  - Atherstone in Warwickshire
  - Corfe Castle in Dorset (The Shrove Tuesday Football Ceremony of the Purbeck Marblers)
  - Haxey in North Lincolnshire (the Haxey Hood, actually played on Epiphany)
  - St Columb Major in Cornwall (Hurling the Silver Ball)
  - Sedgefield in County Durham
  - In Scotland, the Ba game is still popular around Christmas and Hogmanay at:
    - Duns in Berwickshire
    - Scone in Perthshire
    - Kirkwall in Orkney
- Calcio fiorentino – a modern revival of Renaissance football from 16th century Florence.
- La soule in Normandy and Brittany

== Tabletop games and other recreations ==
- Based on association football:
  - Blow football
  - Bubble football
  - Button football
  - Elephant football
  - Foosball – also known as table football/soccer, babyfoot, bar football or gettone.
  - Ice football
  - Subbuteo
- Based on rugby:
  - Penny rugby
- Based on American football:
  - Blood Bowl
  - Paper football
- Others:
  - Paper soccer – paper and pencil game.
  - Penny football – also known as coin football.
  - Phutball – board game.

== See also ==
- List of football video games (disambiguation)
- Table football (disambiguation)
- List of association football competitions
- Episkyros and harpastum – precursors of medieval football.
- Cuju, kemari and sepak takraw – traditional Asian sports that share a few similarities with modern association football.
