= Omegaball =

Variation of association football

Omegaball is a variation of association football in which three five-a-side teams play in a simultaneous competition with each other on a circular pitch that is 60 yards in diameter. The distance from each goal to the center location is roughly 30 yards. Each team has a goal to protect, and the goals are evenly distributed along the perimeter of a circular field.

Teams accumulate one point for each goal they score against an opponent. They do not lose points for goals given up. In the case of an own goal, each of the other two teams receives a point. The victor is the team that scores the highest number of points. When the ball goes out of bounds, it results in a corner kick. There are no offside penalties, goalhanging/cherry picking is allowed). When a goal is scored, the game immediately resumes from that location. Games have a duration of 39 minutes, consisting of three 13-minute periods and 2 breaks. The game made its debut in Irvine, California on March 10, 2022. The inaugural OmegaBall Championship were broadcast on Fox Sports 2. Omegaball has also been featured on ESPN8 The Ocho.

== See also ==
- Three-sided football
- Jorkyball
- Futsal
- Indoor soccer
- Street football
- Roller soccer
- Crab soccer
- Beach soccer
- Swamp football
- Walking football
- Powerchair Football
- Amputee football
- Seven-a-side football
- 3v3 Soccer
