= Table football (disambiguation) =

Table football (foosball) is an in-table game using player figures attached to rotating rods.

Table football or table soccer may also refer to:

- Tabletop football, a class of tabletop games that simulate various forms of football, with moving, or fixed game pieces representing players on a pitch/field
- Button football, a tabletop game using disks as "players"
- Penny football, a simpler coin game played on a tabletop
- Paper football, a tabletop game based on American football that uses a "ball" made of folded paper

== See also ==
- List of types of football
