= 3V3 =

3V3 commonly refers to competition with 3 players on one side versus 3 players on the other side.

This includes many video games and team sports, such as:

- 3v3 Soccer
- 3x3 basketball

It may also refer to:

- 3.3 volts; see RKM code#Similar codes
- In taxonomy, the Catalogue of Life code for order Ploima
