= Federation of International Robot-soccer Association =

Robot sports organization

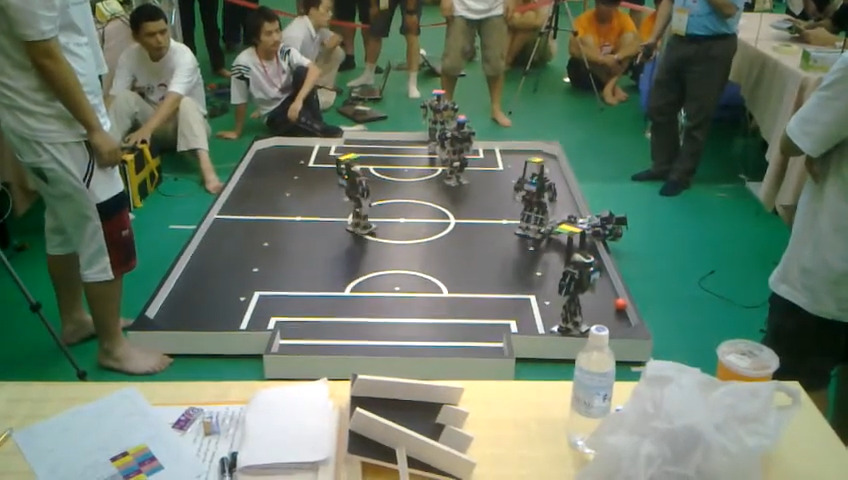
A 3-vs-3 robot soccer match at the 2011 FIRA tournament

The Federation of International Robot-soccer Association (FIRA) is an international organisation organising competitive soccer competitions between autonomous robots. The matches are usually five-a-side.

== History ==
In 1996 and 1997, this competition was known as MiroSot and was held in Daejeon, Korea. The 1996 competition offered a challenging arena to the younger generation and researchers working with autonomous mobile robotic systems.

From 1998 through 2008, it was called the FIRA Cup, and in 2009, it became the FIRA RoboWorld Cup & Congress. The 15th RoboWorld Cup was held at Amrita Vishwa Vidyapeetham, Bangalore, India in September 2010.

In 2013, it took place in Kuala Lumpur, Malaysia. The championship started on August 24, 2013, and ended on August 29. At that time, it involved five categories: Micro-Robot Soccer Tournament, Amire, Naro, Simulated Robot, Android, Robo and Humanoid Robot. It attracted teams from Singapore, Indonesia, Taiwan, India, China, South Korea, the United Kingdom, Mexico, Canada, Russia and Malaysia. 80 teams from 11 countries participated.

In 2018, the competition had 277 teams participating from 12 countries.

=== Past Events ===
FIRA RoboWorld Cup & Related Events (1996–2024)
Title	Period	Host nation	Venues Cities
FIRA RoboWorld Cup & Summit 2024	5-9 August 2024	Brazil	São Luís, Maranhão
FIRA RoboWorld Cup & Summit 2023	17-21 July 2023	Germany	Wolfenbüttel
FIRA SimulCup 2022	10-15 August 2022	Various (Hybrid)	Multiple local hubs worldwide
FIRA SimulCup 2021	9-13 August 2021	Various (Hybrid)	São Luís, Brazil (main hub) + virtual
FIRA RoboWorld Cup 2020	2020 (Online due to COVID-19)	N/A	Online
FIRA RoboWorld Cup 2019	2019	South Korea	Changwon
FIRA RoboWorld Cup & Congress 2018	6-12 August 2018	Taiwan	Taichung
FIRA RoboWorld Cup & Congress 2017	23-27 August 2017	Taiwan	Kaohsiung
FIRA RoboWorld Cup & Congress 2016	14-18 December 2016	China	Beijing
FIRA RoboWorld Cup & Congress 2015	4-9 August 2015	South Korea	Daejeon Metropolitan City
FIRA RoboWorld Cup & Congress 2014	5-9 November 2014	China	Beijing
FIRA RoboWorld Cup & Congress 2013	24-29 August 2013	Malaysia	Shah Alam
FIRA RoboWorld Cup & Congress 2012	20-25 August 2012	UK	Bristol
FIRA RoboWorld Cup & Congress 2011	26-30 August 2011	Taiwan	Kaohsiung
FIRA RoboWorld Cup & Congress 2010	15-19 September 2010	India	Bangalore
FIRA RoboWorld Cup & Congress 2009	18-20 August 2009	South Korea	Incheon
2008 FIRA Cup	22-25 July 2008	China	Qingdao
2007 FIRA Cup	14-17 June 2007	USA	San Francisco
2006 FIRA Cup	30 June-3 July 2006	Germany	Dortmund
2005 FIRA Cup	2005	Singapore	Singapore
2004 FIRA Cup	2004	South Korea	Busan
2003 FIRA Cup	2003	Austria	Vienna
2002 FIRA Cup	2002	South Korea	Seoul
2001 FIRA Cup	2001	China	Beijing
2000 FIRA Cup	2000	Australia	Queensland
1999 FIRA Cup	1999	Brazil	São Paulo
1998 FIRA Cup	1998	France	Paris
1997 MiroSot	1997	South Korea	Daejeon
1996 MiroSot	1996	South Korea	Daejeon

== FIRA RoboWorld Cup & Congress ==
This competition has 4 leagues: FIRA AIR, FIRA Sports, FIRA Challenges, and FIRA Youth. Each league has its own competitions, and each competition can have several events.

=== FIRA AIR ===
The FIRA AIR league has two associated competitions, Autonomous Race and Emergency Service.

=== FIRA Sports ===
The FIRA Sports league has four associated competitions, HuroCup, RoboSot, SimuroSot, and AndroSot. This the robot soccer league.

HuroCup consists of single events for bipedal humanoid robots. The events are: archery, sprint, marathon, united soccer, obstacle run, long jump, spartan race, marathon, weightlifting, and basketball. There is an all-round competition for the single robot that performs the best overall.

=== FIRA Challenges ===
The FIRA Challenges league has three associated competitions, Autonomous Cars, Autonomous Cars Simulation, Innovation and Business.

=== FIRA Youth ===
The FIRA Youth league has six associated challenges, Sport Robots, HuroCup Junior, CityRacer, DRV_Explorer, Cliff Hanger, and Mission Impossible.
