= Cage ball =

Large ball for sport and exercise

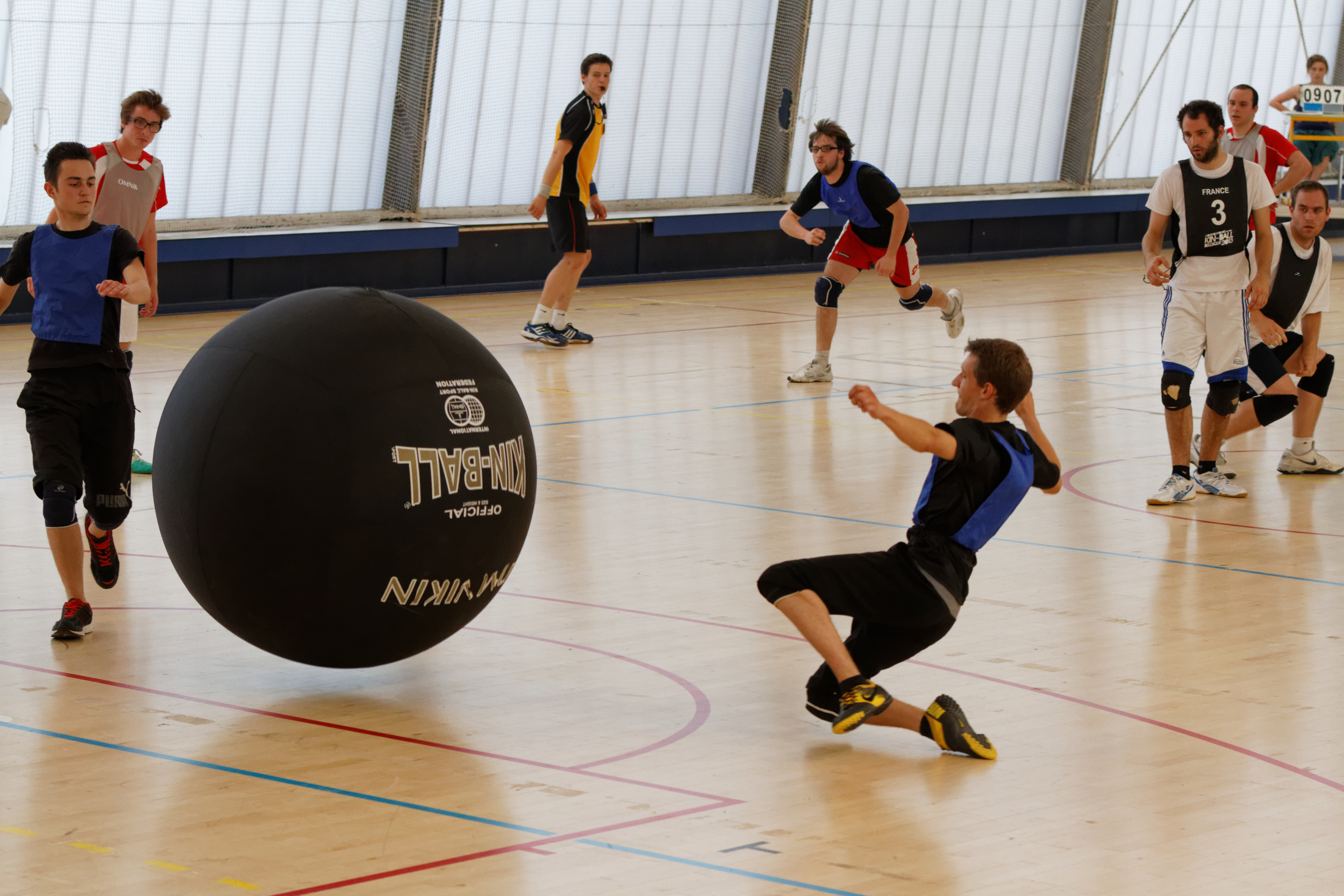
A cage ball in a game of Kin-Ball

A cage ball, also known as an Earth ball, is a large, inflated ball, used in many American elementary schools physical education programs. Cage balls typically have a diameter of 48" or 60", though 72" diameter models are available. The inventor of the cage ball is Doctor Emmett Dunn Angell.

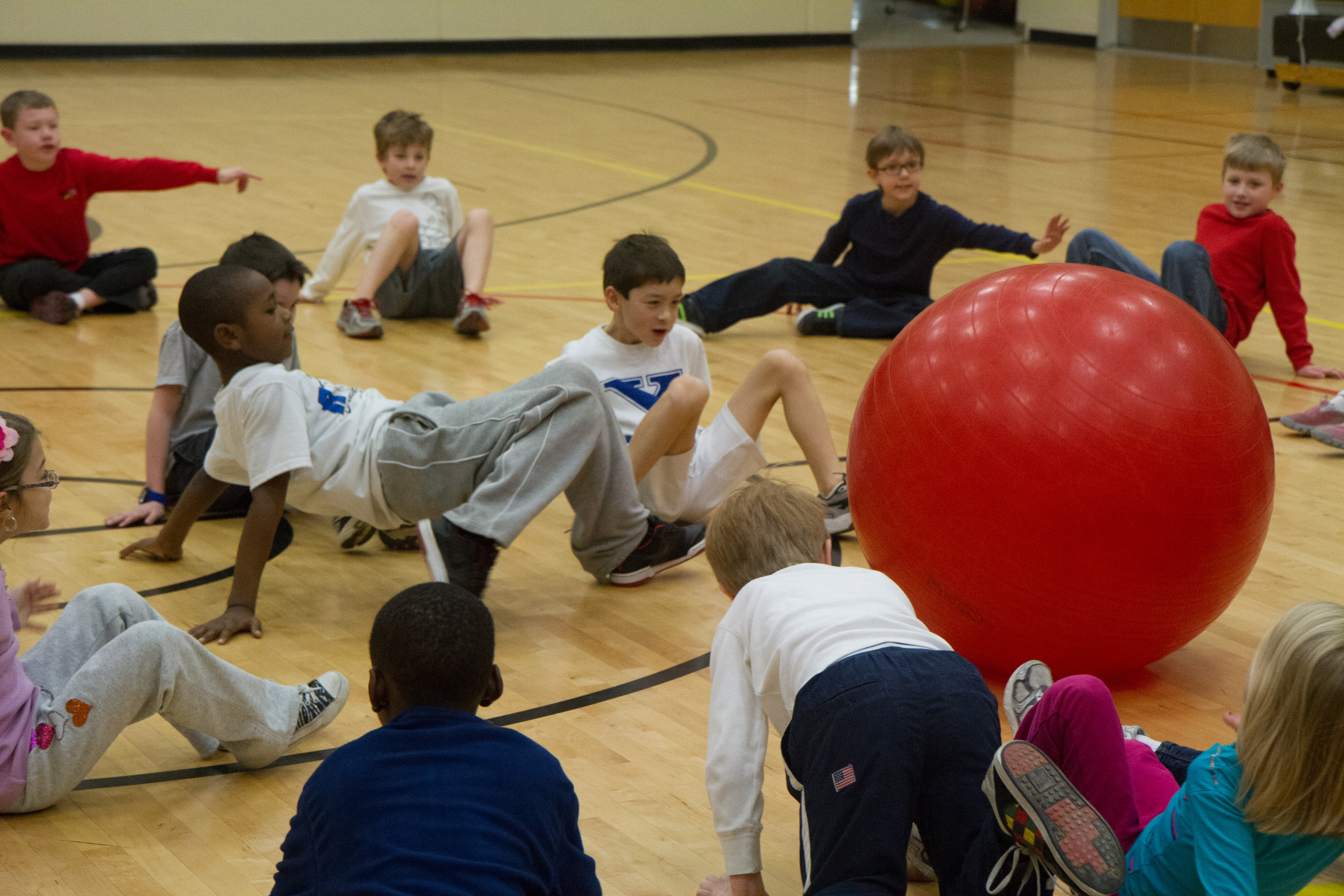
Children playing crab soccer with a cage ball

Physical education teachers will make many uses of cage balls, but perhaps the most common use is to employ it in a pseudo-soccer game. Because of its size, the ball is virtually impossible to dribble downfield, and students simply push against it with their bodies, often with several children climbing on the ball at once. As normally inflated, the ball yields easily to pressure. Some teachers use a rule under which children are permitted only to use their legs and not kick the ball. Cage balls are also used in "cooperative games".

Cage balls are often used to play crab soccer in American schools. The competitive adult sport of Kin-Ball is also played with a cage ball.

Cage balls have an internal rubber bladder to contain the air. The outside is sometimes vinyl, though for many years the covering was only made of canvas. Although spherical (when not being pushed), the cage ball shares the American football's "laces", which hold the bladder in.

== See also ==
- List of inflatable manufactured goods
