= Away team =

Away team may refer to:

- Away team (sports), a sports team on the road and thus without the "home advantage"
- Away team, a landing party assembled to go on extravehicular missions in Star Trek
- Star Trek: Away Team, a real-time tactics video game
- The Away Team (group), a hip hop duo from North Carolina
- Away Team, a US roller soccer team
- Away Team, a US based streetwear clothing brand

== See also ==
- "Heaven's Gate Away Team", a group of members of the Heaven's Gate cult
