= Walking netball =

Slower variant of netball

- First played: 2017

Walking netball is a version of netball adapted to be a slower game and thus more inclusive, allowing older or less fit people to continue playing, return to playing, or take up netball for the first time. The main differences in the rules are that running and jumping are not allowed, that an extra step may be taken with the ball, and that the ball may be held for 4 seconds instead of 3 seconds. A walking netball programme was first developed in England in 2017, as a collaboration between England Netball and the charity Age UK. It is played in countries including England, Australia and New Zealand.

A 2021 research paper, reporting on a project involving introducing members of the Women's Institute in England to the game, found walking netball to be "an acceptable, feasible and effective intervention to increase physical activity and improve health in middle- to older- aged women".

Similar slower-paced sports include walking football (association football), walking rugby, walking basketball. walking hockey (based on field hockey) and walking cricket.
