= Geraldo Décourt =

Brazilian actor and painter

Geraldo Cardoso Décourt (14 February 1911 – 27 May 1998) was a Brazilian actor and painter.

== Early life ==
Décourt was born on 14 February 1911.

== Career ==
In 1929, Décourt invented button football. He is regarded to be one of the first abstractionist painters in Brazil.
