= Shinobis Riders =

ASBL Shinobis Riders
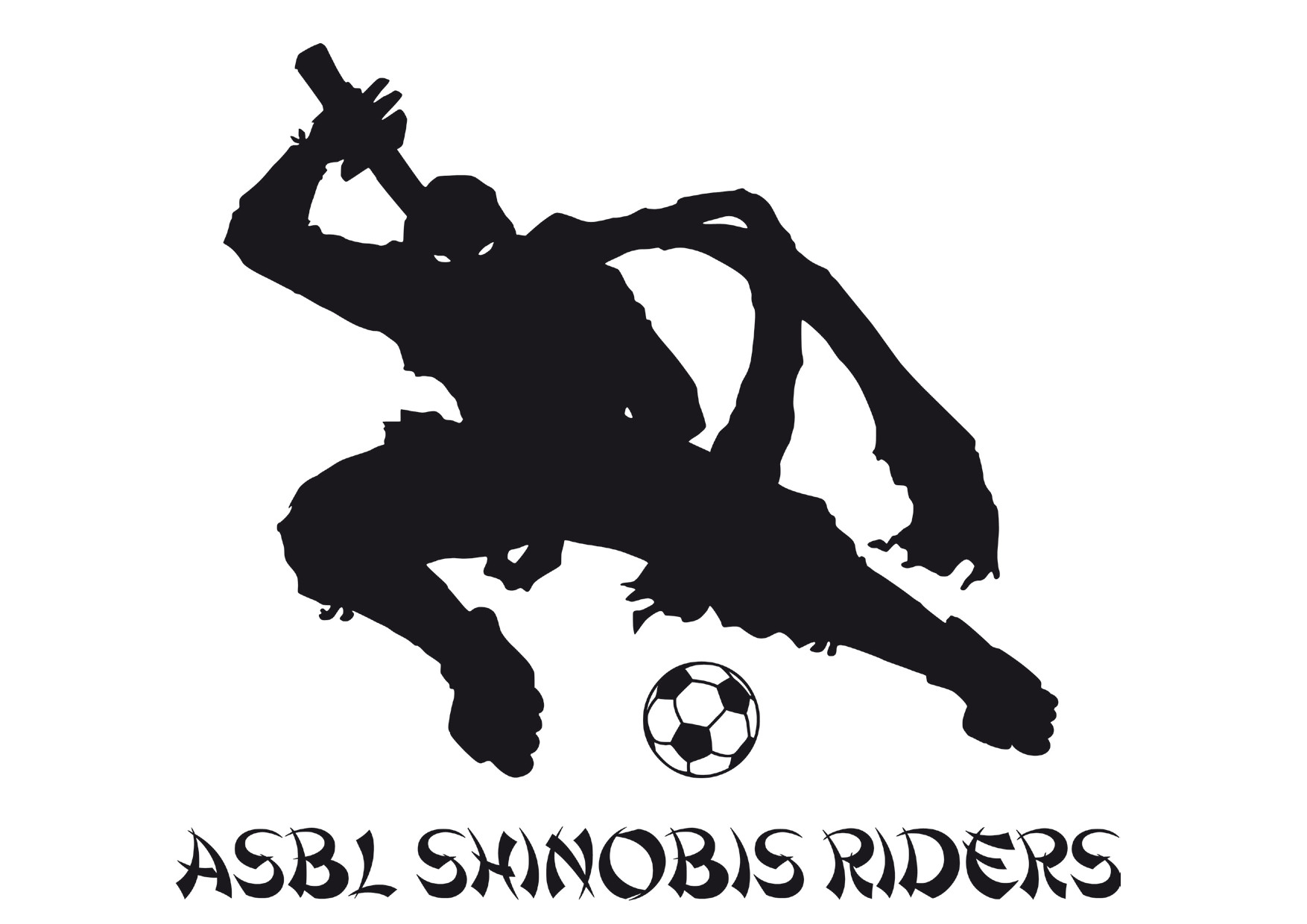
- Nickname(s): Shinobis Riders
- Founded: 2007
- Ground: Stade Charles Van der Putten
- Chairman: Joël Ogunade
- Website: http://www.shinobisriders.be

The ASBL Shinobis Riders, more commonly referred to as Shinobis Riders, is a Belgian roller soccer club created in Brussels in 2009 and directed by Joël Ogunade. It is the first roller soccer club which was born in Belgium (the team has been existing since 2007) and the only one existing in the country until the Bruxelles Roller Foot appeared in 2013. The team is a member of the Belgian Frenchspeaking Skating Federation and currently challenging in the French League of Roller Soccer.

The club has not won any international title yet, its best performance being vice-champion at the Roller Soccer European Cup at Zaandam in the Netherlands in 2011. In April 2019, Shinobis Riders reach the second place at the European Roller Ball Games Tournament which occurred in Ivry-sur-Seine in France. In August of the same year, Shinobis Riders organize and host the 14th edition of the Roller Soccer Clubs World Cup at Tour et Taxis in Brussels, Belgium.

== History ==
In the middle of the 2000s, a group of friends from Brussels tries several urban board sports riding inline skates (roller hockey, freestyle slalom skating, skate jumping, ramp...). One day, two of them (among whom the future president and captain Joël Ogunade) take a ball and start working on passes; shortly after then, they convince their friends to play matches. This hybrid sport combining football and inline skates, which they call "rollerball" at that time as not knowing roller soccer, rapidly becomes "a great passion" according to them: "Little by little, we went from two to five and when we heard, in 2007, that a world championship was taking place in Paris, we decided to take a chance [...] and we managed to reach the fourth place!"

The team repeats the experience the following year as they participate in the Roller Soccer World Cup in San Francisco; they have then gathered more people within the years, have found a place where to train and have been participating in the RSCWC every year since 2007 as well as in other official competitions such as the Roller Soccer European Cup or the Roller Foot Ligue Cup in 2017.

In 2012, they appear in the TV show Belgium's Got Talent in order to promote roller soccer.

In 2017 they compete in two official tournaments: the French tournament Roller Foot League Cup in Ivry-sur-Seine where they end 9th, and the 13th RSCWC in Marseille where they end 5th.

In 2018–2019, they participate in the Île-de-France League with 4 other teams from around Paris, and they finish runners-up, losing in final against UMS Easy Riders.

In April 2019, they compete for Belgium during the first edition of the European Roller Ball Games Tournament which gathers five European nations around three sports: roller soccer, rollball and roller basket. Shinobis Riders wins the roller soccer tournament and finish second on the final ranking of the tournament of the three sports taken together, with equality on points with Great Britain team.

In August 2019, Shinobis Riders host and participate in the 14th edition of the RSCWC in Brussels. Aside from the sports competition, an associative village was taking place with many stands such as a bar, a kitchen place, a section with wooden games, an area of archery and a target of dart foot. Shinobis Riders finish at the 4th place of the tournament after their defeat 3–1 in third-place play-off against Phénix from Marseille.

== Club identity ==
=== Name ===
The name Shinobis Riders finds its origin in a will to mix "two passions, rollerskating and Asian culture, with "shinobi' meaning "ninja"." The term "riders" refers to the way of practicing the sport, riding on inline skates instead of running on the feet as in common football.

=== Logo ===
The logo of the club represents a Japanese "shinobi" as a black shadow puppet on a white background, riding inline skates and unsheathing with his left hand a katana attached in his back. Added to this character is a ball on the foreground in order to refer to roller soccer, and finally the name of the club under the whole picture. The logo is printed on the front of the shirt, at the chest level, in black colour on red background for the "home" shirt, in black colour on white background for the "away" shirt, and in red colour on black background for the "third" shirt.

=== Colours ===
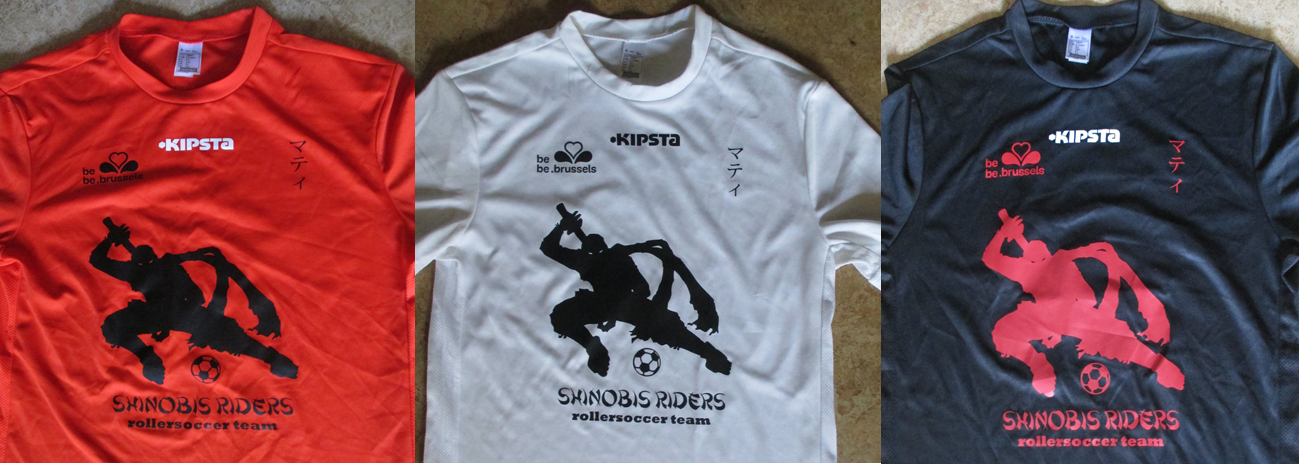
Shirts worn by the Shinobis Riders for the season 2016–2017.

The club displays for the 2016–2017 season a red and black shirt at home, black shorts and black socks. These colours refer to both two of the three colours of the Belgian flag (red and black) and to the colour of which the Japanese "shinobi" are traditionally depicted (black). The previous "home" shirts were distinguished from the current ones by two little yellow stripes on the shoulders, to complete the reference to the colours of the Belgian flag. There are two other shirts, worn depending on the trips or the colours of the opposite team in order to better make the difference between the two teams on the field; these shirts are also worn when the prime team of the club plays against the second one, which can happen with the contingency of the competitions. The first one ("away" shirt) is white and the second one ("third" shirt) is black. On the other hand, the shorts and the socks remain black whatever shirt is worn.

Behind each shirt is printed the first name or name indicating the player wearing it, as well as a number, written in Arabic numerals or Japanese numerals; the player is free to choose the name or nickname, the number and the corresponding typography. On the front of the shirt, on the left side at the chest level, the first name of the player is printed in kanji, in the same colour with the logo.

== Current team ==
The current team is composed of 18 players, among 6 were in the prime team during the Roller Foot Ligue Cup 2017; they were 8 in the prime team and 10 in the team B during the RSCWC 2019. The latter is a team of young players aged between 8 and 16 years old. Since 2018 a coach is directing both teams and Joël Ogunade has the captain's armband during official matches.

== Honours and records ==
=== Results at the World Cup ===
The club has not won any title in an official international or local competition yet. Its best performance remains a second place at the European Cup in 2009 in Zaandam in the Netherlands, the final being lost against the Slovenian club of Rollera Ljubljana. In the World Cup, the Shinobis Riders achieved their best performance in 2007 in Paris and in 2019 in Brussels by ending at the 4th place of the tournament.

The following table traces for each occasion of the competition the winner, the place at which the prime team ended and the host city.

History of the Shinobis Riders at the Roller Soccer Club World Cup
Edition	Year	Winner	Shinobis Riders' rank	Host city
5th	2007	(France) AMSCAS	4th	(France) Paris
6th	2008	(United States) RSC Originators	5th	(United States) San Francisco
7th	2009	(France) AMSCAS	6th	(Belgium) Brussels
8th	2010	(France) AMSCAS	11th	(Italy) Piacenza
9th	2011	(France) AMSCAS	Non participation	(Brazil) Recife
10th	2012	(France) AMSCAS	5th	(France) Marseille
11th	2013	(France) AMSCAS	6th	(Netherlands) Zaandam
12th	2015	(France) RSC Toulon	7th	(France) Toulon
13th	2015	(France) Phénix Roller Foot Marseille	5th	(France) Marseille
14th	2013	(France) UMS Easy Riders	4th	(Belgium) Brussels

=== Results at the European Cup ===
The following table traces for each occasion of the competition the winner, the place at which the prime team ended and the host city.

History of the Shinobis Riders at the Roller Soccer Club European Cup
Edition	Year	Winner	Shinobis Riders' rank	Host city
1st	2010	(France) AMSCAS	Non participation	(France) Marseille
2nd	2011	(Slovenia) Rollera Ljubljana	2nd	(Netherlands) Zaandam
3rd	2012	(France) AMSCAS	Non participation	(Slovenia) Ljubljana
4th	2013	(France) AMSCAS	4th	(France) Luc-sur-Mer

=== Results in the other official and non-official tournaments ===
- Forchies' "6 hours enduro"
  - 2006: 4th place
  - 2007: 2nd place
- Jurbize "6 hours enduro" 2008: 2nd place
- RollerSoccer Friendly Tournament of Nantes
  - 2012: 1st place
  - 2013: 1st place
- Roller Foot Ligue Cup of Ivry-sur-Seine 2017: 9th place
- European Roller Ball Games Tournament of Ivry-sur-Seine 2019: 2nd place of the tournament over the three sports (roller soccer, rollball et roller basketball), 1st place of the tournament in roller soccer
- Île-de-France League, season 2018-2019: 2nd place

=== Records ===
The Shinobis Riders team has among its staff:

- the highest number of young players in a roller soccer team (between 12 and 18 years old);
- the highest number of female players in a team (three in the second team during the 2016–2017 season);
- a double world champion captain in roller freestyle.

== See also ==
- Roller soccer
