= Shove ha'penny =

Pub game

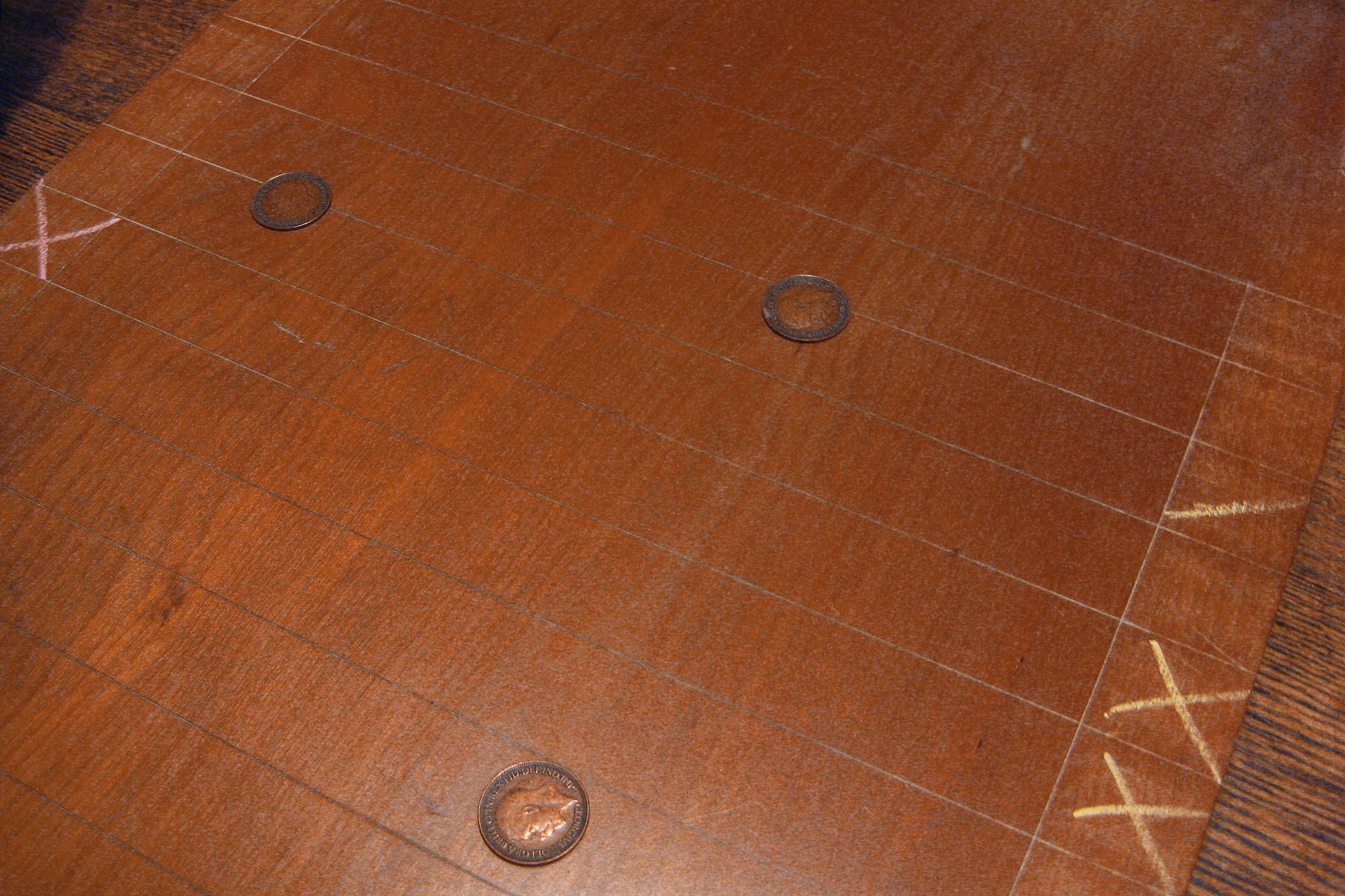
A shove ha'penny game in progress

Shove ha'penny, or shove halfpenny, (/ʃʌv ˈheɪpəni/) also known in ancestral form as shoffe-grote ['shove-groat' in Modern English], slype groat ['slip groat'], and slide-thrift, is a pub game in the shuffleboard family, played predominantly in the United Kingdom. Two players or teams compete against one another using coins or discs on a tabletop board.

== Board ==
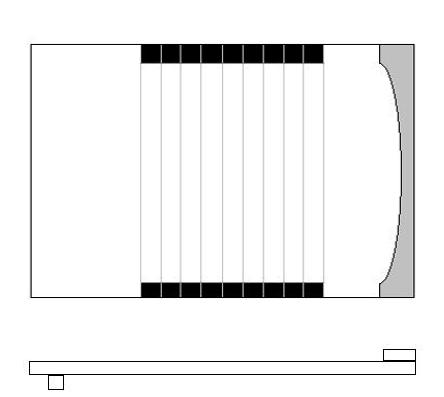
Diagram of the board, seen from above and from the side

Shove ha'penny is played on a small, rectangular, smooth board usually made of wood or stone. A number of parallel lines or grooves run horizontally across this board, separated by about one-and-a-half coin diameters. The spaces between the lines (usually nine) are called the "beds". Five British halfpenny coins "ha'pennies" (now obsolete pre-decimalisation coinage, diameter 1 inch; 25 mm) or similarly-sized coins or metal discs are placed one-by-one at one end of the board slightly protruding over the edge and are shoved forward toward scoring lines, with a blow from the palm of the hand.

In the opinionated (and rare) book The Shove Ha'penny Board Displayed, author Trelawney Dayrell-Reed asserted that the best boards are made of unvarnished walnut or mahogany. In parts of Southern England, primarily Somerset, Dorset and Hampshire, the board is made of slate and lubricated with arrowroot powder or French chalk, which makes the polished ha'pennies glide with a very light touch.

The five-coin turns are alternate, and the coins are cleared between turns, so there is no nudging of opponents' coins. Indeed, both players use the same coins, and it is a serious mistake to move the coins back to the bottom of the board before one's opponent has had a chance to check the scoring, as they may be distracted by drinking and so suspect one of cheating. Sometimes teams compete, playing in sequence, but scoring is as for single players. Experienced players (including Dayrell-Reed) conclude that merely placing the coins between the lines is too easy so that to score they must be placed almost exactly in the centre of the bed. An exact placement by a single shove, rather than by nudging into position by subsequent shots, is called a "flopper" and will command applause, especially if it is a winning shot. In competition games, a scoring placement is judged by a referee. In times past, considerable sums could be wagered on games of shove ha'penny, and influencing the referee – whether actual or suspected – could result in sudden and violent confrontations. Because of this, some public houses have a strong antipathy to games of shove ha'penny and will only allow trusted locals to play, sometimes keeping the board in a back room and denying its existence to strangers. This is particularly common in the case of the Dorset long board, making it difficult even for a shove ha'penny enthusiast to ascertain how many pubs still have this archaic board.

The Dorset long board is a somewhat different game, employing a larger board marked with a four-square and semicircles rather than horizontal lines. This board can be viewed in a British Pathé newsreel. The short-board game was regularly featured in Yorkshire TV's Indoor League programme during the 1970s.

== Gameplay ==
A player shoves five coins or metal discs (ha'pennies) up the board in each turn. To prepare each coin to be pushed, the player positions the coin at the front of the board, with the rear of the coin just sticking over the edge of the board. Any part of the hand can then be used to strike the coin, shoving it up the board. If the coin does not reach the first line on the board, that coin does not count as having been played and can be shoved again.

At the end of the turn, each coin that is completely within a "bed" (between two horizontal lines and within the bordering vertical lines) scores a point for that player in that bed. The points are scored with chalk marks in the squares at either end of the bed on the edge of the board, one player owning the right side, the other, the left. The aim is to get three chalk marks in each of the squares - three scores in each of the nine beds. However, once three scores have been made in a bed, any further scores in that bed will be given to the opponent instead, unless the opponent already has three scores in the bed. The one exception to this is the winning point, which must be scored properly by the winning player, not given away.

Players will attempt to cause a coin to knock onto one or more previously pushed ha'pennies in an effort to improve their position, as well as trying to make a score with the ha'penny being played. A little thought is also required – it is not usually a good move to score the third coin in a bed until towards the end of a hand, so as to set up coins in positions that will increase the chances that later coins will score by coming up from below and stopping behind the earlier coins. This is particularly true in the "progressive" variant of the game, where, after a player's hand of five coins is complete, any scoring coins are recorded and then pulled back to be replayed in the same turn. A player may try to place early coins not only to promote scoring using later coins, but also in such a way as to be pushed by the later coins into positions where further scoring opportunities may be created. Thus, in this version of the game, a very gifted (and/or lucky) player could theoretically win the game in a single turn.

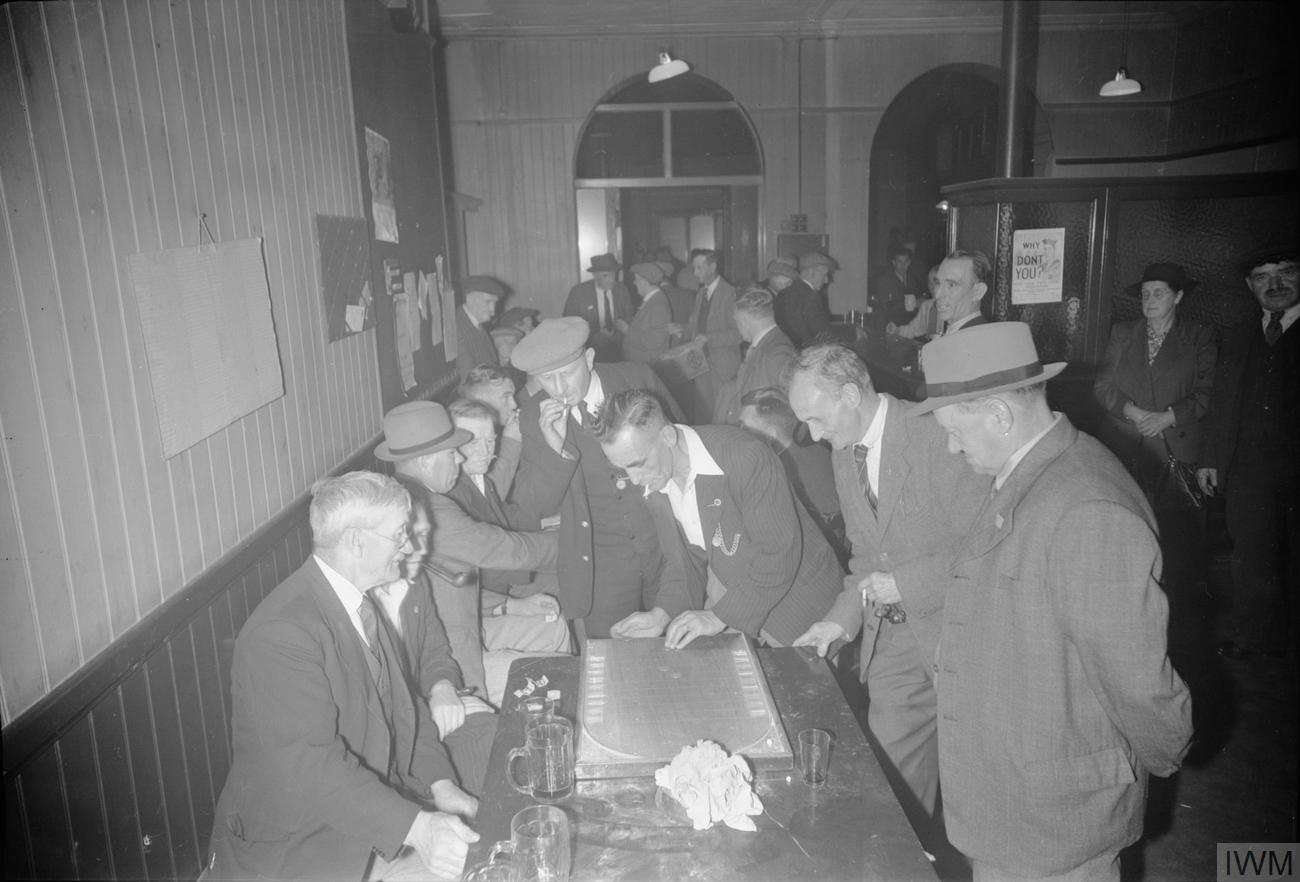
Men playing shove ha'penny at the Labour Club in Reading, Berkshire, England (1945)

The game has its own body of specialised jargon, providing a host of colourful names for particular scoring opportunities, shots and board features, as well as special rules of etiquette. Trelawney Dayrell-Reed asserts (tongue in cheek) that the appropriate penalty for someone unfortunately wetting the board with a drink ring (and thus compromising its playing surface) is to be "painfully destroyed without benefit of clergy."

Another important etiquette is to wipe the scoring area, after completing a game, away from the playing area as the marking chalk is coarse and interferes with the lubrication of the surface. Indeed, the condition of the surface is considered so critical that a shortage of arrowroot from St. Vincent due to crop failures proved problematic, as supplies from alternative sources did not perform well.

== See also ==
- Paper football
- Penny football
- Pub games
