= Halfpenny (British pre-decimal coin) =

Former coin of the United Kingdom and other territories

One old halfpenny
- United Kingdom
- Value: 1/2d sterling
- Mass: (1860–1967) 5.67 g
- Diameter: (1860–1967) 25.48 mm
- Edge: Plain
- Composition: (1672–1860) Copper (1860–1967) Bronze
- Years of minting: 1672–1967

Obverse
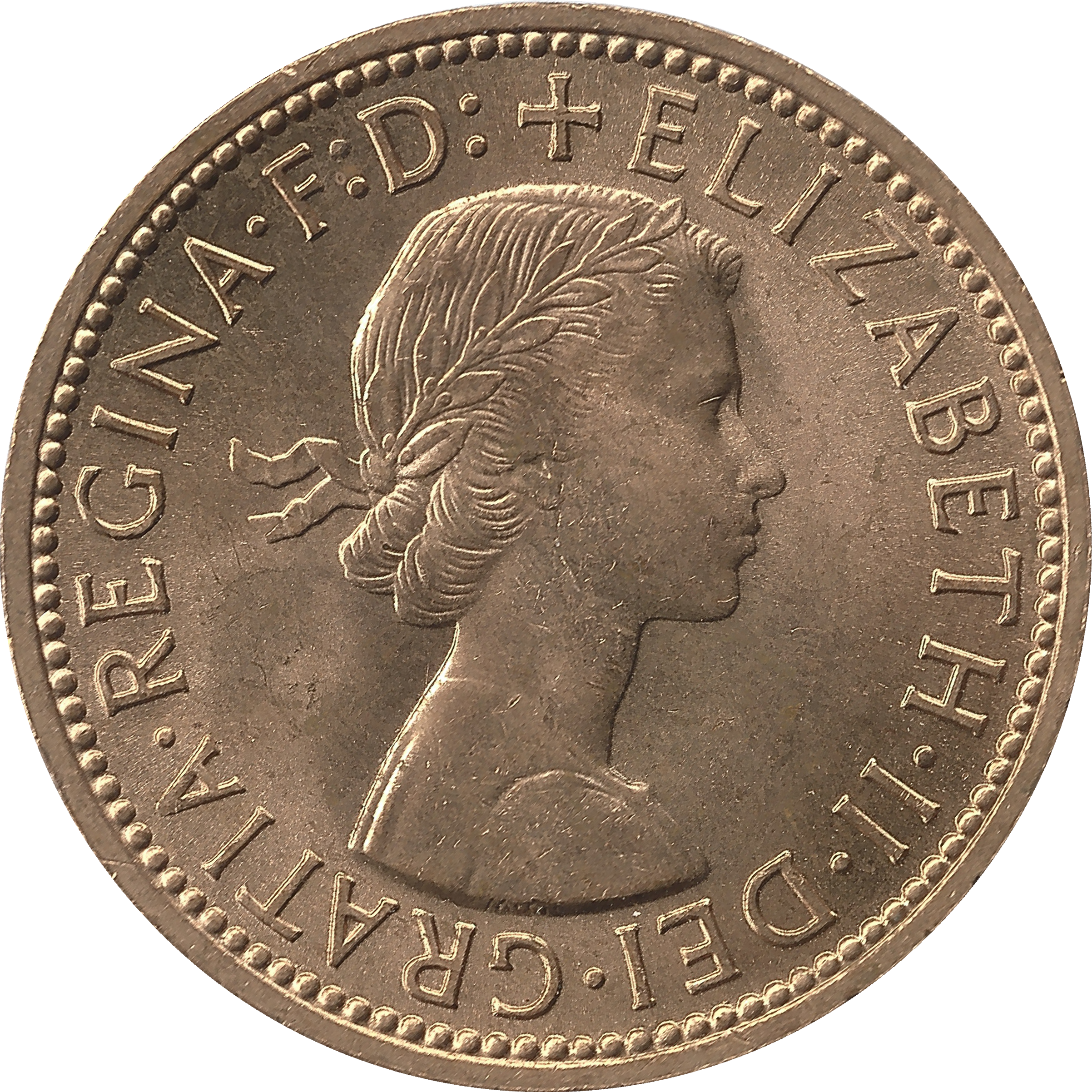
- Design: Profile of the monarch (Elizabeth II design shown)
- Designer: Mary Gillick
- Design date: 1953

Reverse
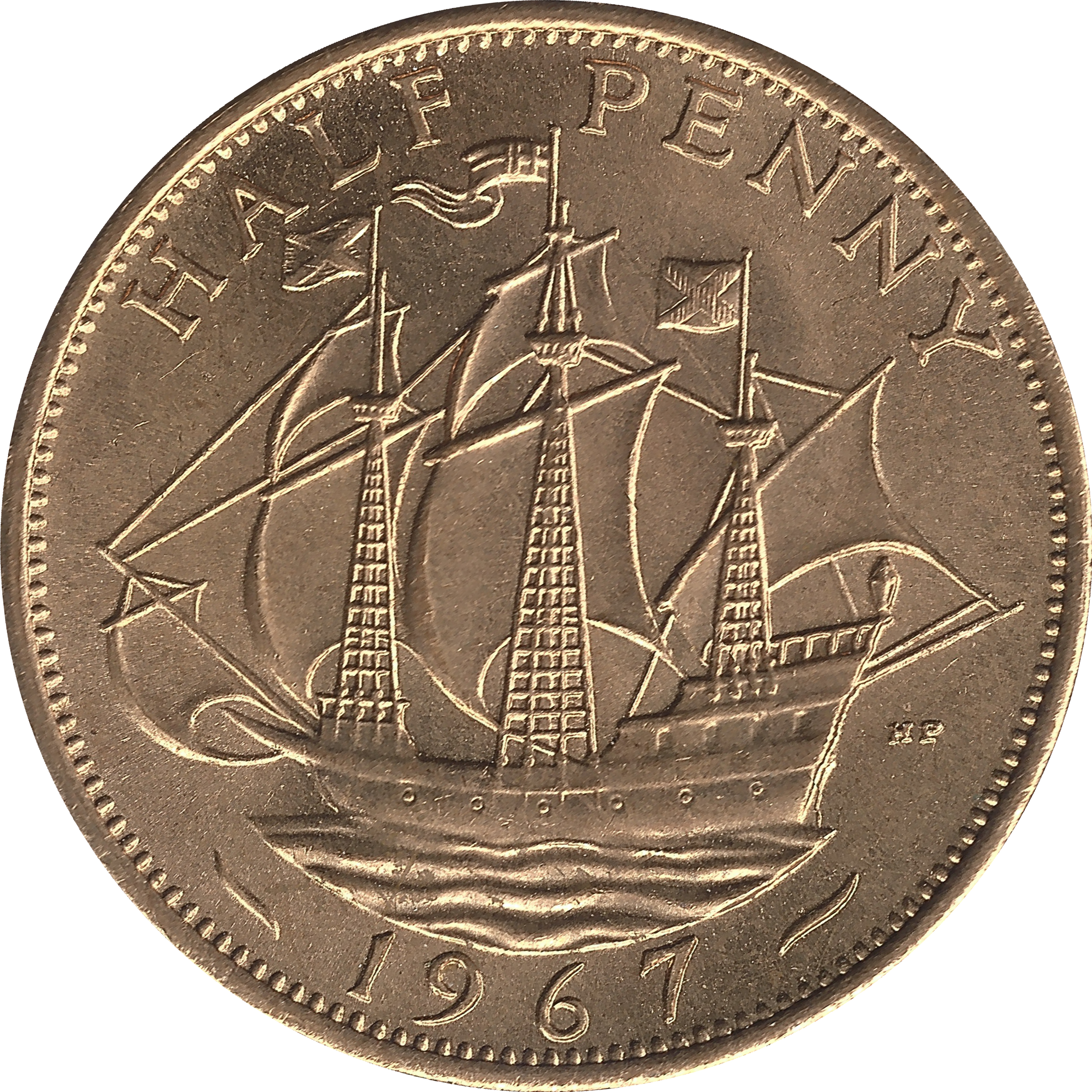
- Design: Golden Hind (Britannia on earlier mintages)
- Designer: Thomas Humphrey Paget
- Design date: 1937

The British pre-decimal halfpenny (pronounced /ˈheɪpəni/ HAY-pən-ee), once abbreviated ob. (from the Latin 'obulus'), is a discontinued denomination of sterling coinage worth 1/480 of one pound, 1/24 of one shilling, or 1/2 of one penny. Originally the halfpenny was minted in copper, but after 1860 it was minted in bronze. In the run-up to decimalisation, it ceased to be legal tender from 31 July 1969 (although halfpennies dated 1970 were minted as part of a final pre-decimal commemorative set). The halfpenny featured two different designs on its reverse during its years in circulation. From 1672 until 1936 the image of Britannia appeared on the reverse, and from 1937 onwards the image of the Golden Hind appeared. Like all British coinage, it bore the portrait of the monarch on the obverse.

"Halfpenny" was colloquially written ha'penny, and "1 1/2d" was spoken as "a penny ha'penny" /ə ˈpɛni ˈheɪpni/ ə HAYP-nee or three ha'pence /θriː ˈheɪpəns/ three HAY-pənss. "Halfpenny" is a rare example of a word in the English language that has a silent 'f'.

Before Decimal Day in 1971, sterling used the Carolingian monetary system, under which the largest unit was a pound divided into 20 shillings, each of 12 pence. Each penny was further divided into 4 farthings, thus a pound contained 480 halfpennies and a shilling contained 24 halfpennies.

While the halfpenny is no longer in circulation, it continues to be used by enthusiasts of the traditional British pub game, shove ha'penny.

== Design ==
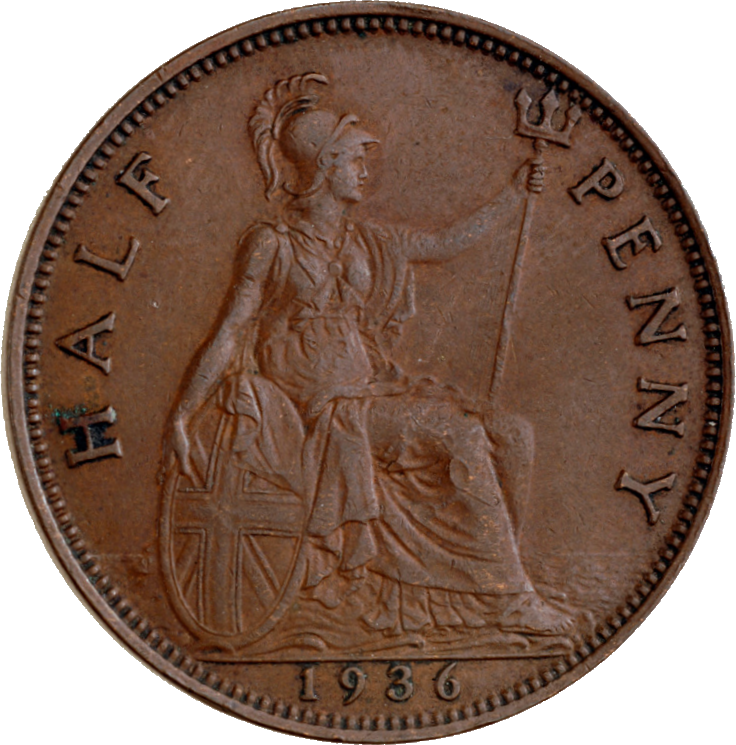
Original reverse: 1717–1936

The original reverse of the bronze version of the coin, designed by Leonard Charles Wyon, is a seated Britannia, holding a trident, with the words HALF PENNY to either sides. Issues before 1895 also feature a lighthouse to Britannia's left and a ship to her right. Various minor adjustments to the level of the sea depicted around Britannia, and the angle of her trident were also made over the years. Some issues feature toothed edges, while others feature beading.

Over the years, various different obverses were used. Edward VII, George V, George VI and Elizabeth II each had a single obverse for halfpennies produced during their respective reigns. Over the long reign of Queen Victoria two different obverses were used, but the short reign of Edward VIII meant no halfpennies bearing his likeness were ever issued.

During Victoria's reign, the halfpenny was first issued with the so-called 'bun head', or 'draped bust' of Queen Victoria on the obverse. The inscription around the bust read VICTORIA D G BRITT REG F D. This was replaced in 1895 by the 'old head', or 'veiled bust'. The inscription on these coins read VICTORIA DEI GRA BRITT REGINA FID DEF IND IMP.

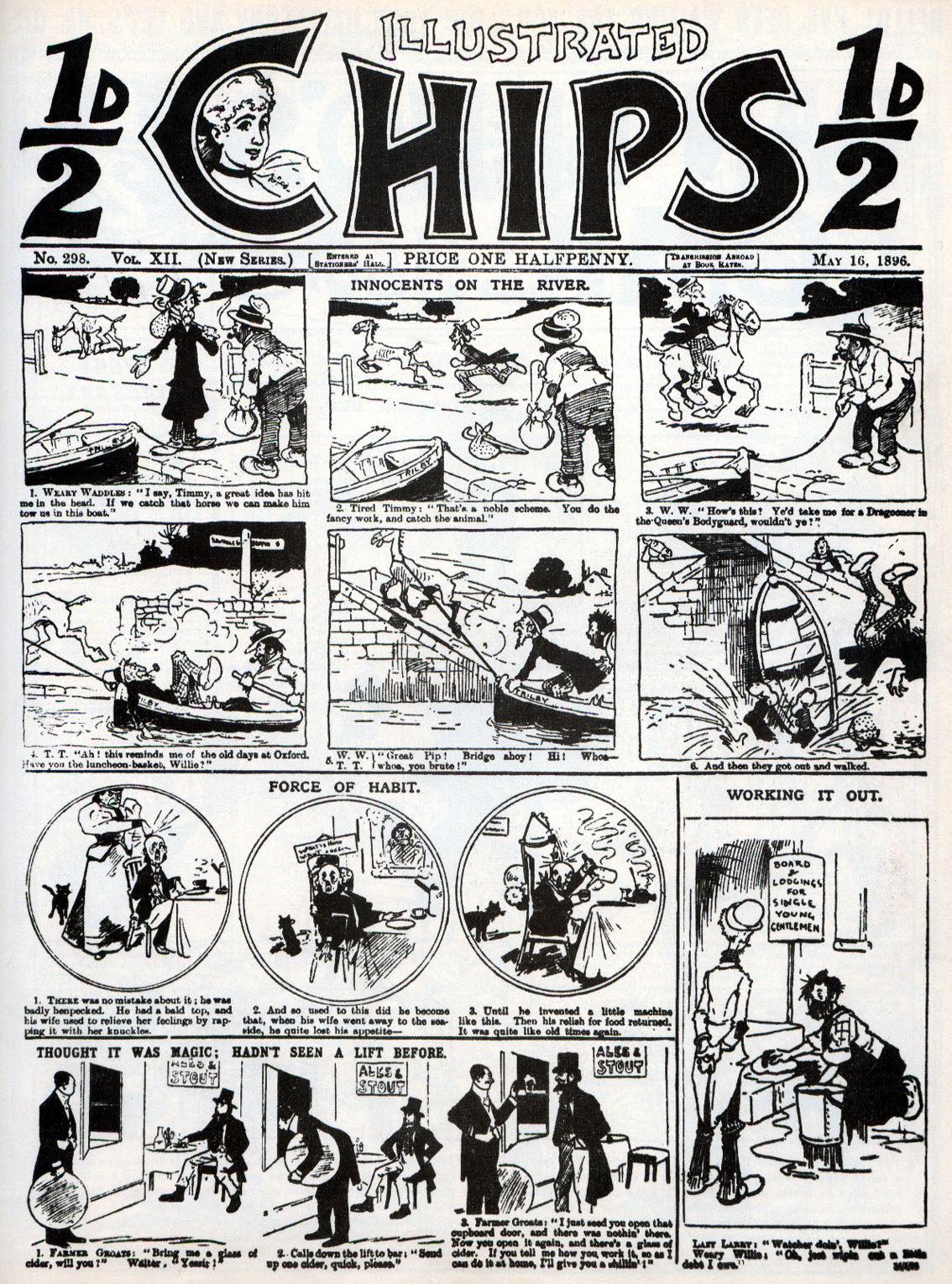
Illustrated Chips comic in 1896, sold for a halfpenny

Coins issued during the reign of Edward VII feature his likeness and bear the inscription EDWARDVS VII DEI GRA BRITT OMN REX FID DEF IND IMP. Similarly, those issued during the reign of George V feature his likeness and bear the inscription GEORGIVS V DEI GRA BRITT OMN REX FID DEF IND IMP.

A halfpenny of King Edward VIII (1936) does exist, dated 1937, but technically it is a pattern coin i.e. one produced for official approval; it would probably have been due to receive this approval at about the time that the King abdicated. The obverse shows a left-facing portrait of the king (who considered this to be his better side, and consequently broke the tradition of alternating the direction in which the monarch faces on coins – some viewed this as indicating bad luck for the reign); the inscription on the obverse is EDWARDVS VIII D G BR OMN REX F D IND IMP.

The pattern coin of Edward VIII and regular issue halfpennies of George VI and Elizabeth II feature a redesigned reverse displaying Sir Francis Drake's ship the Golden Hind.

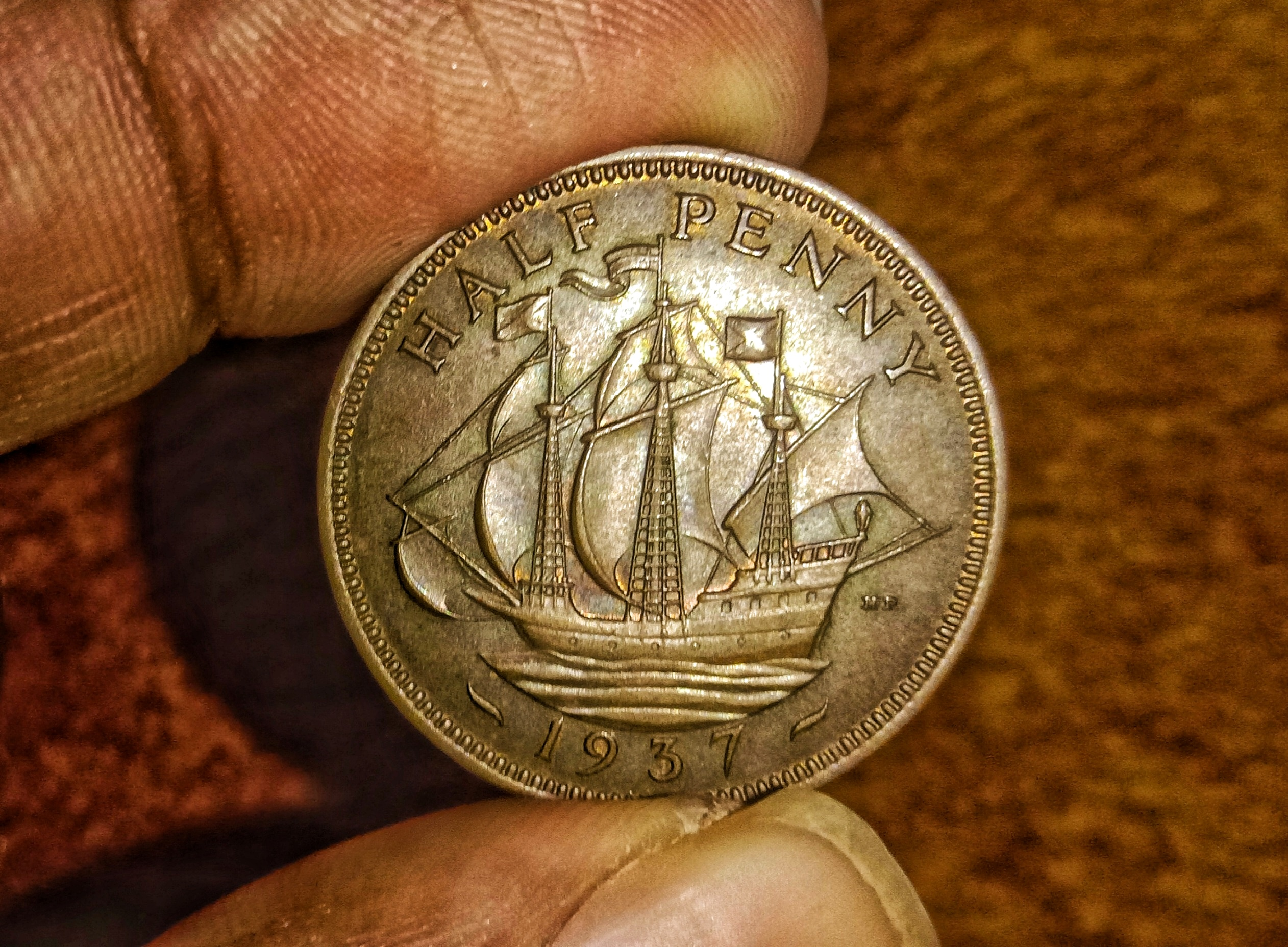
A 1937 halfpenny (reverse), depicting the Golden Hind

George VI issue coins feature the inscription GEORGIVS VI D G BR OMN REX F D IND IMP before 1949, and GEORGIVS VI D G BR OMN REX FIDEI DEF thereafter. Unlike the penny, halfpennies were minted throughout the early reign of Elizabeth II, bearing the inscription ELIZABETH II DEI GRA BRITT OMN REGINA F D in 1953, and ELIZABETH II DEI GRATIA REGINA F D thereafter.

== Mintages ==
Victoria (Veiled bust)
- 1895 ~ 3,032,000
- 1896 ~ 9,143,000
- 1897 ~ 8,690,000
- 1898 ~ 8,595,000
- 1899 ~ 12,108,000
- 1900 ~ 13,805,000
- 1901 ~ 11,127,000

Edward VII
- 1902 ~ 13,673,000
- 1903 ~ 11,451,000
- 1904 ~ 8,131,000
- 1905 ~ 10,125,000
- 1906 ~ 11,101,000
- 1907 ~ 16,849,000
- 1908 ~ 16,620,999
- 1909 ~ 8,279,000
- 1910 ~ 10,770,000

George V
- 1911 ~ 12,571,000
- 1912 ~ 21,186,000
- 1913 ~ 17,476,000
- 1914 ~ 20,289,000
- 1915 ~ 21,563,000
- 1916 ~ 39,386,000
- 1917 ~ 38,245,000
- 1918 ~ 22,321,000
- 1919 ~ 28,104,000
- 1920 ~ 35,147,000
- 1921 ~ 28,027,000
- 1922 ~ 10,735,000
- 1923 ~ 12,266,000
- 1924 ~ 13,971,000
- 1925 ~ 12,216,000
- 1926 ~ 6,712,000
- 1927 ~ 15,590,000
- 1928 ~ 20,935,000
- 1929 ~ 25,680,000
- 1930 ~ 12,533,000
- 1931 ~ 16,138,000
- 1932 ~ 14,448,000
- 1933 ~ 10,580,000
- 1934 ~ 7,704,000
- 1935 ~ 12,180,000
- 1936 ~ 22,009,000

George VI
- 1937 ~ 24,504,000
- 1938 ~ 40,320,000
- 1939 ~ 28,925,000
- 1940 ~ 32,162,000
- 1941 ~ 45,120,000
- 1942 ~ 71,909,000
- 1943 ~ 76,200,000
- 1944 ~ 81,840,000
- 1945 ~ 57,000,000
- 1946 ~ 22,726,000
- 1947 ~ 21,226,000
- 1948 ~ 26,947,000
- 1949 ~ 24,744,000
- 1950 ~ 24,154,000
- 1951 ~ 14,868,000
- 1952 ~ 33,278,000

Elizabeth II
- 1953 ~ 8,926,000
- 1954 ~ 19,375,000
- 1955 ~ 18,799,000
- 1956 ~ 21,799,000
- 1957 ~ 43,684,000
- 1958 ~ 62,318,000
- 1959 ~ 79,176,000
- 1960 ~ 41,340,000
- 1962 ~ 41,779,000
- 1963 ~ 45,036,000
- 1964 ~ 78,583,000
- 1965 ~ 98,083,000
- 1966 ~ 95,289,000
- 1967 ~ 146,491,000
- 1970 ~ 750,000 (souvenir sets only)

== Terminology ==
Ha'porth: British English i.e. 'halfpenny-worth' or 'halfpennyworth' pronounced /ˈheɪpəθ/.

In literal use usually written out in full although still never pronounced phonetically: e.g. "A halfpennyworth of chips." Also used in the once common phrase: "daft ha'porth."

In figurative use usually said disparagingly: e.g. "I've been dying for somebody with a ha'porth of wit and intelligence to talk to." "...and saying it doesn't make a halfpennyworth of difference!"
(from Alan Bennett's A lady of Letters, written and produced in 1987, some sixteen years after decimalisation and three years after the New Halfpenny—(i.e. the decimal 1/2p)—had been demonetised and withdrawn from circulation, thus further illustrating the continued traditional or idiomatic two-syllable pronunciation).

== See also ==
- Shove ha'penny, a traditional pub game
