= List of football video games =

List of football video games may refer to:

- List of association football video games (soccer)
- List of American football video games
- Chronology of indoor American football video games
- List of Australian rules football video games
