= Elephant football =

Elephant soccer
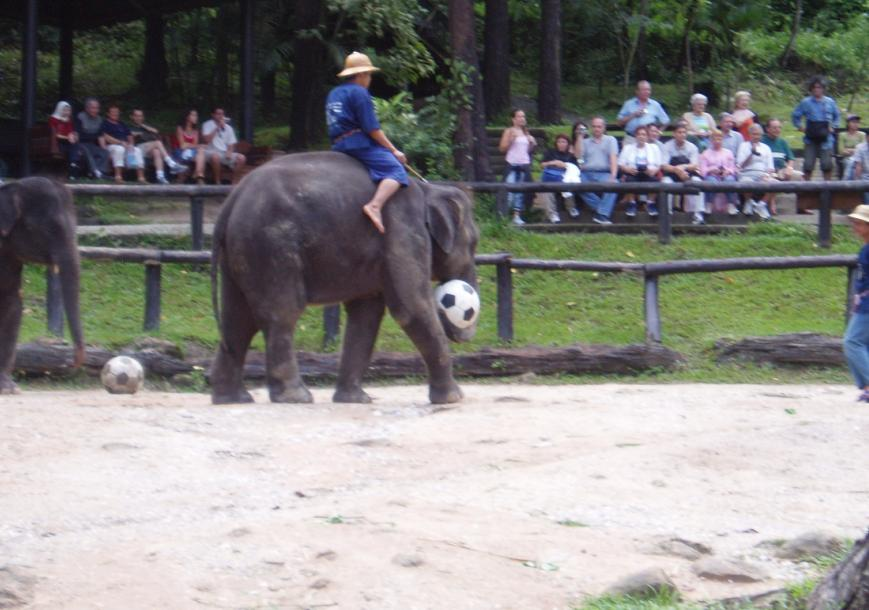
- Elephant football in Chiangmai, Thailand

Characteristics
- Equipment: elephants

Presence
- Country or region: Thailand, Nepal and India

Elephant football or elephant soccer is an animal show from Thailand, Nepal and India, taking the form of an association football variant played on elephants.

== Rules ==
Elephant football is played with similar rules to association football, but all players must be riding elephants. The elephants will attempt to kick the ball into the opposition's net to score a goal. Elephant football is played on a smaller pitch to association football, and is played with a large inflatable ball, rather than a standard football.

== See also ==
- Elephant Polo
