= Kin-Ball =

Team sport

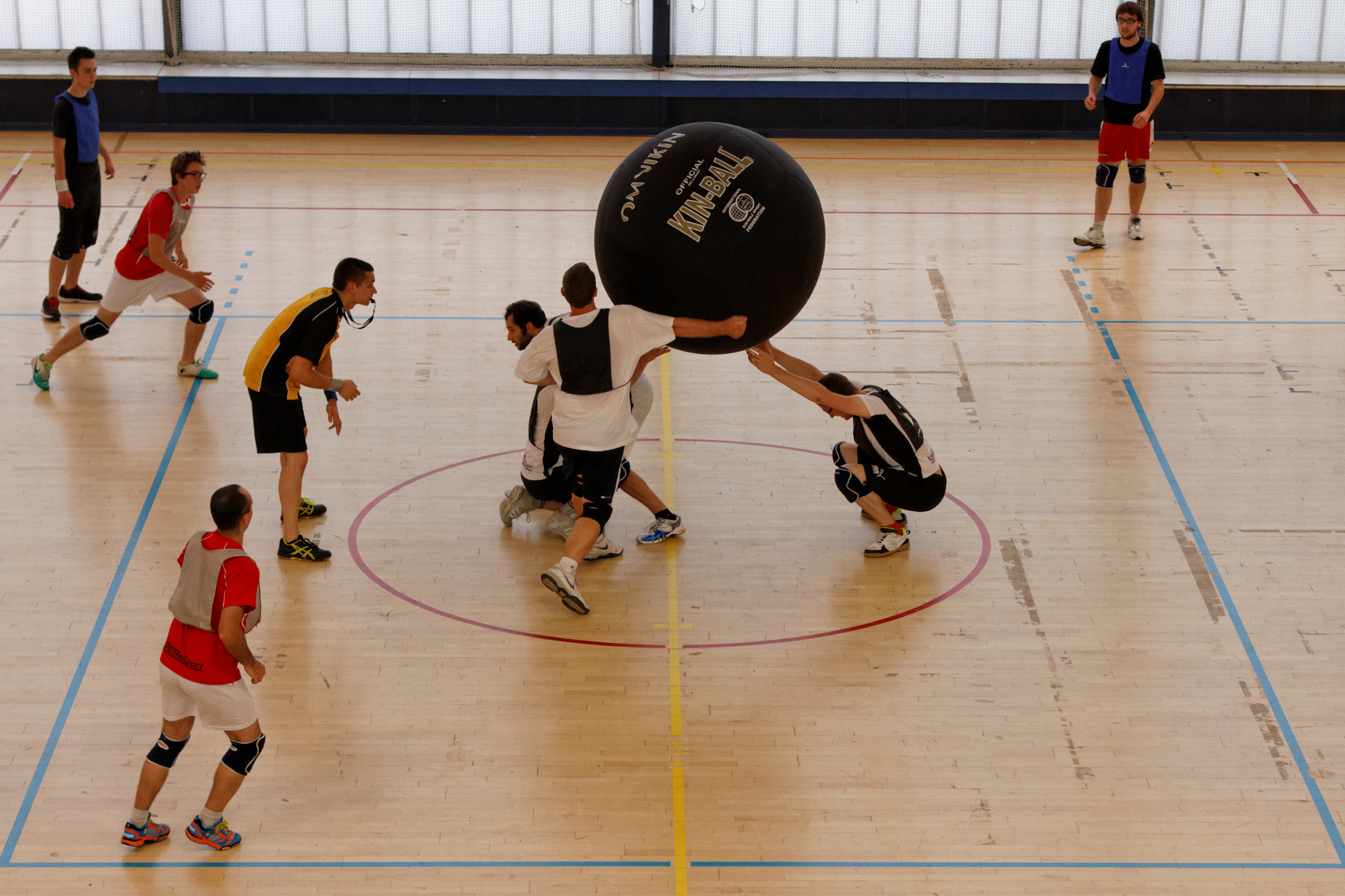
- The black team is about to strike the ball.
- Highest governing body: International Kin-Ball Federation
- First played: 1986; 40 years ago in Québec

Characteristics
- Mixed-sex: No, separate
- Type: Gym/court sport
- Equipment: - Black, grey, or blue Kin-Ball; – ball diameter: 1.2m (48 inches); – ball weighs 1 kg; – court size is 20×20 meters (66×66 feet) (court lines are included in measurement)
- Venue: Gymnasium or court

Presence
- Country or region: Worldwide
- Olympic: No

Kin-Ball is a team sport created in Quebec, Canada, in 1986 by Mario Demers, a physical education professor.

The main distinctive characteristics are the large size of the ball (1.2m (48 inches) in diameter) (Note: Unit conversions, and any rounding variations, are as given in the official rulebook.) and that the matches are played by three teams at the same time. The International Kin-Ball Federation counts 3.8 million participants, primarily from Canada, the U.S., Japan, Belgium, France, Switzerland, Spain, Germany, Denmark, the Czech Republic, Malaysia, China and Hong Kong. The newest country is the UK with Kin-Ball UK having formed in 2018.

== Game ==
Kin-Ball game

The official Kin-Ball team colours are black, grey and blue. (Sometimes pink is used instead of blue). The Kin-Ball's diameter is 1.2 m (48 inches) and the ball weighs 1 kilogram (2.2 lb). The court size is 20×20 meters (66×66 feet; court lines are included in measurement). Three teams play per game and each team has four players.

The team in possession of the ball is the Attacking Team. To make a play, the Attacking Team will designate a Defending Team, by calling out their colour. The designation has to start with the declaration "Omnikin!" followed by the colour of another team. After the designation, the ball has to be hit with a body part above the hips, while all other members of the Attacking Team touch the ball, in some way. If the Defending Team is able to control the Kin-Ball successfully, it becomes the Attacking Team.

A Kin-Ball game is usually played until one team has won three periods. Each period takes about 10 minutes to play. When the first team reaches 9 points in a period, the team with the fewest points has to leave the court and the remaining two teams play until one team reaches 11 points.

A player can commit a series of fouls during the match:

1. Not being able to catch the ball before it touches the ground.
2. Hitting the ball out of bounds or stepping out of bounds while touching the ball.
3. Walking with the ball after the third player touches the ball during a play.
4. Hitting the ball with a downward trajectory.
5. Hitting the ball less than 1.8 meters.
6. Not all players of a team being in contact with the ball.
7. Making a mistake during the colour announcement (wrong colour, more than one player talking, etc.).
8. Having more than 1 player within 1.8 meters during the hit (close defense).
9. Intentionally interfering with a defending player.

Whenever a team commits a foul, the other two teams receive 1 point each. This ensures that teams of a lower skill level are kept in play, so long as they do not commit too many fouls of their own in a row.

== International competitions ==
=== Men ===
Year	City	Gold Medal	Silver Medal	Bronze Medal
2001	(Canada) Québec	Canada	Japan	Belgium
2002	(Canada) Québec	Canada	Japan	France
2005	(Belgium) Ans	Canada	Japan	France
2007	(Spain) Bilbao	Canada	Japan	France
2009	(Canada) Trois-Rivières	Canada	Belgium	Japan
2011	(France) Nantes	Canada	Japan	France
2013	(Belgium) Pepinster	Canada	Japan	Belgium
2015	(Spain) Torrejón de Ardoz	Japan	France	Czechia
2017	(Japan) Tokyo	Canada	Japan	Czechia
2019	(France) Les Ponts-de-Cé	Canada	France	Japan
2024	(South Korea) Osan	Japan	Canada	Belgium

=== Women ===
Year	City	Gold Medal	Silver Medal	Bronze Medal
2001	(Canada) Québec	Canada	Japan	Belgium
2002	(Canada) Québec	Canada	Japan	France
2005	(Belgium) Ans	Canada	Japan	France
2007	(Spain) Bilbao	Canada	Japan	France
2009	(Canada) Trois-Rivières	Canada	France	Japan
2011	(France) Nantes	Canada	Japan	Switzerland
2013	(Belgium) Pepinster	Canada	Japan	Belgium
2015	(Spain) Torrejón de Ardoz	Canada	Japan	France
2017	(Japan) Tokyo	Canada	Japan	France
2019	(France) Les Ponts-de-Cé	Canada	Czechia	Japan
2022	(Czech Republic) Hradec Králové	Belgium	Czechia	France
2024	(South Korea) Osan	Canada	Japan	Belgium
