= Button football =

Tabletop dexterity game

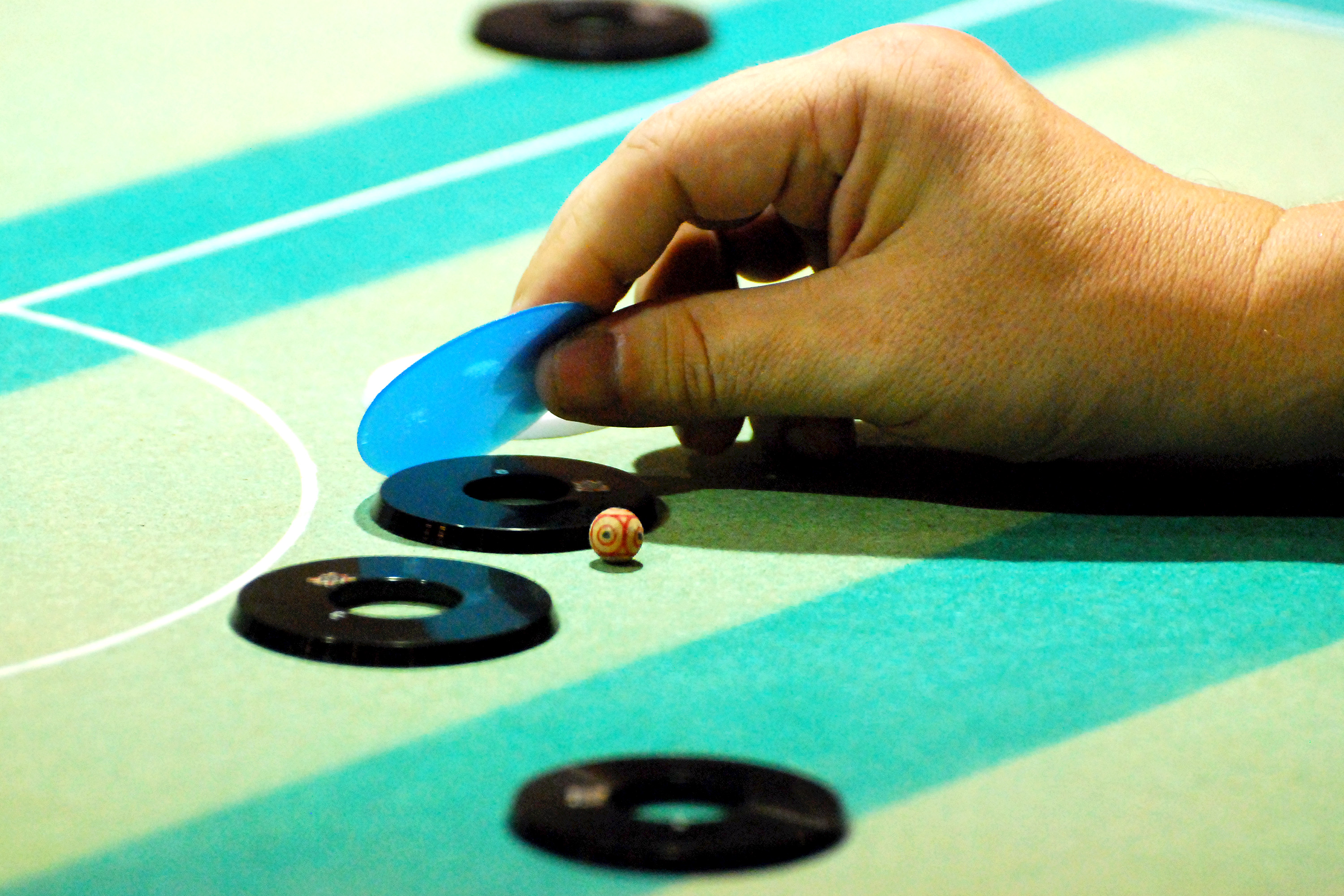
Button football pieces

Button football or button soccer is an association football simulation game played on a tabletop, using concave buttons or special-made disks to represent players on the pitch (field), often with a larger rectangular block as the goalkeeper piece. Board dimensions, markings, and rules of play are modeled to simulate standard football. It is popular in Brazil, as well as various countries in Europe, including Hungary, Georgia and Slovenia.

The term "button football" or "buttonball" is an imperfect translation, as there is no standard name for the game in English. In Portuguese, it is known as either futebol de mesa ("table football", which would commonly be confused with table football also known as foosball), or as futebol de botão ("button football"). In Hungarian, it is called asztali labdarúgás ("table football"), gombfoci ("button football"), or szektorlabda ("sector-ball"). In Georgian, it is called ghilburti (ღილბურთი). In Slovenia it is called knofkanje.

== History ==
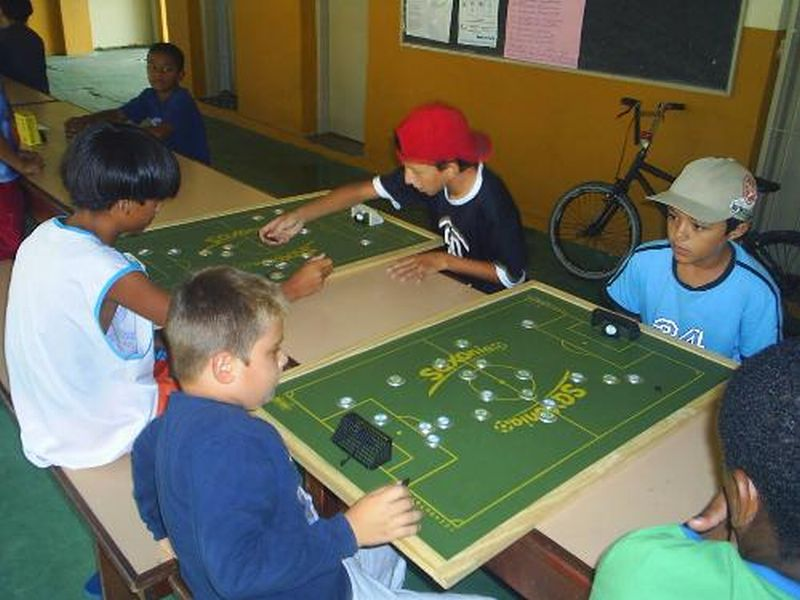
Children playing the game

The origins of button football are likely derived from any number of games played with tabs, bottle caps, or coins. The invention of the game using 11 pieces per side with rules simulating football is unclear, though a 6-piece version is known to have originated in eastern Europe.

In Brazil, the patron of button football is widely accepted as Geraldo Décourt. He began playing in 1922 as a schoolboy, using buttons removed from his clothing as pieces. Décourt published the first known rule and guide book in 1930. He named the game “Celotex”, after the material which covered the tables on which it was played. Décourt continued to promote the game and organize tournaments on and off for the rest of his life.

In 1962 the Federação Paulista de Futebol de Mesa (Paulista Federation of Button Football) was formed. There are dozens of formalized button football clubs and leagues throughout Brazil, and recently in the US, in Houston, Texas, and the San Francisco Bay Area in California. Likewise in Hungary, button football can be traced back to the early 1900s, with schoolboys taking the buttons off their coats to play. Hungarian button football is played everywhere from organized leagues and tournaments, to home-made football tables and at playgrounds.

Button football continued to grow in popularity, especially during the early 1950s. In that era, various materials were used for linesmen, some industrial, some hand-made. Industrial buttons could be ten-piece sets, uniform in size and color, or sold as individual pieces, varying in size according to function (larger ones for defenders, mid-sized ones for midfielders, smaller ones for attackers) and in several layered color combinations usually but not necessarily patterned after the more popular soccer teams; of the latter, the most prized ones were made of galalite, although several other plastic materials were also used such as the covers of discarded watches.

Hand-made buttons were usually made from coconut shells, horn or bone sections and similar materials. Industrial buttons often went through some extent of "tuning", such as scraping or slicing off layers or trimming playing edges. The same was done to pieces such as bus tokens, atop which clothes buttons were glued. Goal tenders were most often than not matchboxes about 6 by 4 cm filled with molten lead slabs for stability.

As a rule, in informal games and tournaments players could mix and match different kinds, sizes and color buttons. Later on, the game became more strictly formalized, dispensing with variety for the sake of standardization. Today there are dozens of button football clubs throughout Brazil and Hungary, rigidly structured, with regular tournaments at the local, state, and national level. The majority of boys (and to a lesser extent girls) in both these countries play button football at some point in their youth.

In Georgia, button football is played by a small community of players. The tradition of the game originated in 1970s and is played by successive generations. The game is typically played on a plywood, with a set of 10 buttons and a goalkeeper per team. The "buttons" today are uniformly sized, hand-made disks smoothed with sandpaper and a file. Each disk has a specific shape and form depending on its role in the team and position. Players use the smaller disk as the "ball". The Georgian-rules game consists of two halves of 15 minutes each.

== Equipment ==
The game is played on a smooth, flat surface with markings per a regulation football field. Typical dimensions of the table would be 1.84 m long by 1.20 m wide, with the field being 1.67 m by 1.04 m. Goals are typically 12.5 cm wide by 5 cm tall per the interior dimensions.

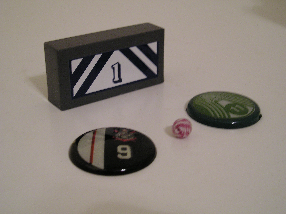
Typical ball, buttons, and goaltender game pieces

Each team consists of 11 pieces, 10 field pieces, or buttons, in the form of small circular disks, and 1 goaltender piece in the form of a rectangular block. At the opening kickoff, all 11 pieces are relegated to their respective sides. Button are always circular in shape. Lower quality pieces are made of plastic and of a wide variety of diameters. Higher quality pieces are made of fiberglass, having a diameter of typically between 35 mm and 50 mm, and a height usually no greater than 8 mm. Nowadays, in formal games and tournaments, all buttons should be of the same material, color and size. Such standardization is decried by older players, as in their view it robs teams from variety and from similitude to real-life soccer teams. Buttons can be decorated with markings and numbers typical of a football jersey, as well as graphics of famous players or team logos, but no large diversity within a given team is allowed..

Goaltender pieces are rectangular blocks with dimensions and weights closely regulated. Typical dimension limits include 35 mm width x 80 mm height x 15 mm depth.

The game ball is a sphere of woven felt with a diameter of 10 mm weighing between 0.1 and 0.3 grams.

Buttons are propelled using a flat circular plastic disc (that could be a thin flat button, as well) of approximately the same diameter as the buttons or higher. Physical characteristics are not critical.

== Gameplay ==
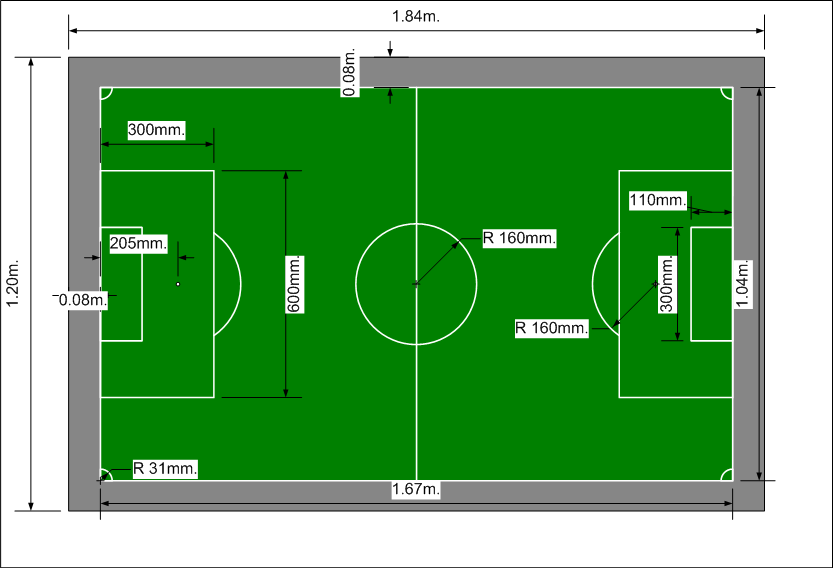
Sample dimensions of a button football table and field

There are a variety of different rule systems to define play. The following general guidelines are common to most, if not all:

At the opening kickoff, all 11 pieces are relegated to their respective sides. Field players are moved during the game by using a circular disk to exert a downward force on the field pieces, propelling them forward (pieces may never be pushed with the disk). Field pieces are propelled forward to strike the game ball. The ball is either sent forward and then hit again with the same field piece the next play (i.e. "dribbling"), sent forward towards another field piece on the same team (i.e. "passing"), or towards the opposing goal (i.e. "shooting"). Players alternate manipulating their pieces based on the possession rules defined in each rule system.

Shots on goal must be declared by the attacking team prior to being taken to allow the defending team to adjust its goalkeeper. If the ball enters the goal without a shot having been declared, the goal is annulled.

If a field piece strikes an opposing piece prior to hitting the ball, that is declared a foul. If the ball hits an opposing piece then stays within the field of play, possession is relinquished to the opposing team. If the ball leaves the field of play, possession is taken by the team that did not hit touch the ball last before going out of bounds.

Button may be manually manipulated at intervals determined by the governing rule system, usually only during stoppages in play.

For corner kicks, free kicks, and penalty shots, the ball is placed in the appropriate location and a button is placed behind it at the attacking player's discretion. Throw-ins and goal kicks are simulated by placing the ball at the appropriate location, then either flicking the ball with disk or goalkeeper, or again by lining up a button behind the ball (depending on the rules of the particular rule system).

Fouls may also be declared for gameplay offenses such as affecting pieces or the ball at inappropriate times, touching the opposing player's pieces, or unsportsmanlike conduct.

Specific rules are defined for each rule system, with the primary difference being the number of touches each team may have per possession.

== Rule systems ==
The various rule systems differ predominantly regarding the number of touches each team may have. They will also cover specific guidelines equipment and game conduct. Within Brazil and Hungary, there are three most popular rule systems:

=== Twelve-touch ("Paulista" or from São Paulo state) ===
Game duration: two 10-minutes halves.

Number of touches: 12 per team per possession, no more than 3 with any field piece

Principal characteristics: Higher scoring than conventional soccer. This style of play favors skilled touches and shooting rather than offensive strategy. Defensive strategy plays a more significant role in the positioning and marking of offensive pieces.

A variation used mostly in informal games places no limit to the number of consecutive touches by a team in possession of the ball, or by any of its pieces. While favoring ball control, this mode allows skilled players to stall games and play by the clock. This is the most widely used rule system in Hungary and Brazil, highly favored at international tournaments.

=== Three-touch ( "Regra Carioca" or from Rio de Janeiro state) ===
Game duration: two 25-minutes halves

Number of touches: 3 per team per possession, shots on goal only following a pass

Principal characteristics: Scoring typical of conventional football. Strategy primarily revolves around limiting opposing team shots on goal.

=== One-touch ("Baiana" or from Bahia state) ===
Game duration: two 25-minutes halves

Number of touches: 1 per team per possession; 2 at the onset of play (start, half, throw-in and goal-kick)

Principal characteristics: Very difficult to play with very low scoring. Strategy primarily revolves around sending the ball into opposing half of play and maintaining the ball in that position.

== See also ==
- Penny football, a simpler game using coins
- Tabletop football, the class of tabletop football simulations
  - Sports table football, tabletop football as a competitive sport of its own
  - Subbuteo, a commercial brand of such games
- Table football or foosball, an in-table football simulator with player figures mounted on rotating rods
- Shove ha'penny, an ancestral disk-sliding game
