= Crab soccer =

Football game played while crab walking

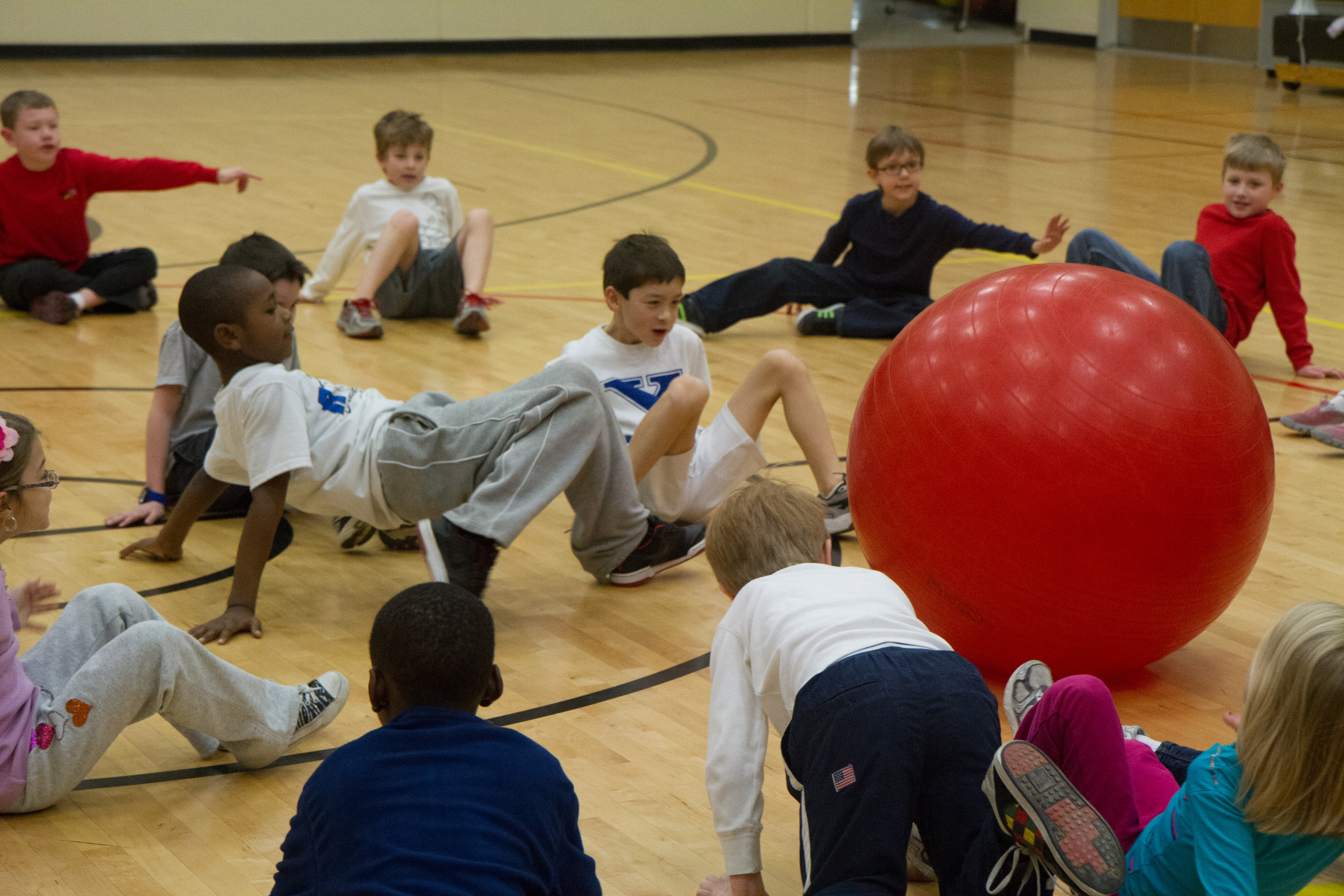
Children playing crab soccer with a large red ball

Crab football (British English) is an informal sport that originated in Britain in 1863, derived from Association football played by two teams, commonly in physical education classes. As with regular football, the objective is to kick an inflated ball into a goal to score the most points. Unlike football, players support themselves on their hands and move with their feet, in motions that make them look like crabs, a method known as crab walking. Crab football may be played outdoors or in a gymnasium, and is more commonly thought of as being a sport played by children. The game can be played with a regular football, but is often played with a cage ball.

There are various sets of rules, with the main one being that each team must have an equal number of players, teams can vary in sizing 2-11 people depending on space. This sport involves kicking, so safety is at the root of many rules. Like football, the only player that may use their hands is the goalkeeper: all other players must not touch the ball with their hands and must stay in a "crab position" at all times. No players may stand except for the goalkeeper. Once players are equally divided the ref will drop the ball in the middle of the court to begin the game, after each point is scored, and when the ball goes out of bounds. The first team to reach five points wins.
