= Penny football =

Tabletop coin game

Penny football (also coin football, sporting coin, spoin, table football, tabletop football, or shove ha'penny football) is a coin game played upon a table top. The aim of the game is for a player to score more goals with the pennies than their opponent.

The game has been in existence since at least 1959. An electronic version of the game has also been produced.

== Gameplay ==
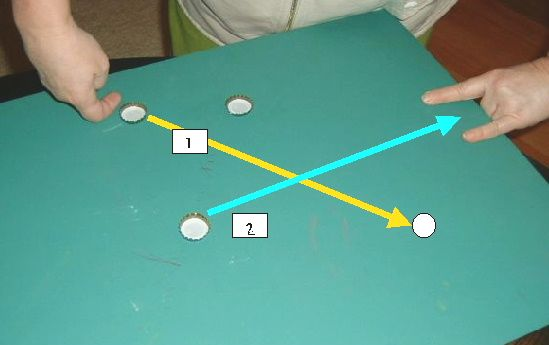
If a player flicks a bottletop (1) to a particular point on the table, they can follow by flicking a different top (2) between the other two, to the goal.

While varieties of the game exist, the core game mechanic is usually the same: players have three coins on the table in a triangle, and try to flick one of the coins in-between the other two, creating another triangle; the player whose turn it is gets to repeat this as long as the coin they touched crosses the line between the other two coins and stays on the table, or some sort of point is scored. Variations may also force a player forfeit their turn if the coin being flicked hits another coin, as well as the ability to ricochet the flicked coin off by placing the other hand on the table with the fingernails facing outwards.

The goal in which players are meant to score is usually represented by the opponent's hand, placed on the table with their pinky finger and index finger flat on the table, so that the middle two knuckles of their hand are flat with the table edge; a piece of paper may also be substituted. Touching the goal with the coin being flicked counts as a goal.

Variations include the manner in which the game is started: turns may start by simply tossing the three coins on the table, or placing them on their edge of the table in a triangle facing the player.

There is another variation of the game in which players use four coins, the fourth coin representing a goalkeeper. Again, the opposing player puts out their index and pinky fingers, but also puts the fourth coin under their index finger. The coin acts as a "goalkeeper", and may be used to block shots. They then stick out the pinky finger of their other hand and place it right next to the other hand to form the other post of the goal. The two hands should be touching. If the defending player blocks the shot with their index finger rather than the coin, the shot counts as a goal.

Another variation aligns the scoring closer to gridiron football: If the coin hits the knuckles that represent the goal, the player gets three points. Players get 4 "plays" (or however many they decide), and by the fourth one, attacking players need to flick a coin so it is hanging over the edge of the table. If it goes over, it becomes the opponent's turn, If it stays on the table but hangs over, it counts as a "touchdown", scoring 7 points.

== See also ==
- Button football
- Paper football
- Shove ha'penny
- Tabletop football
