= Swamp football =

Form of soccer played in bogs or swamps

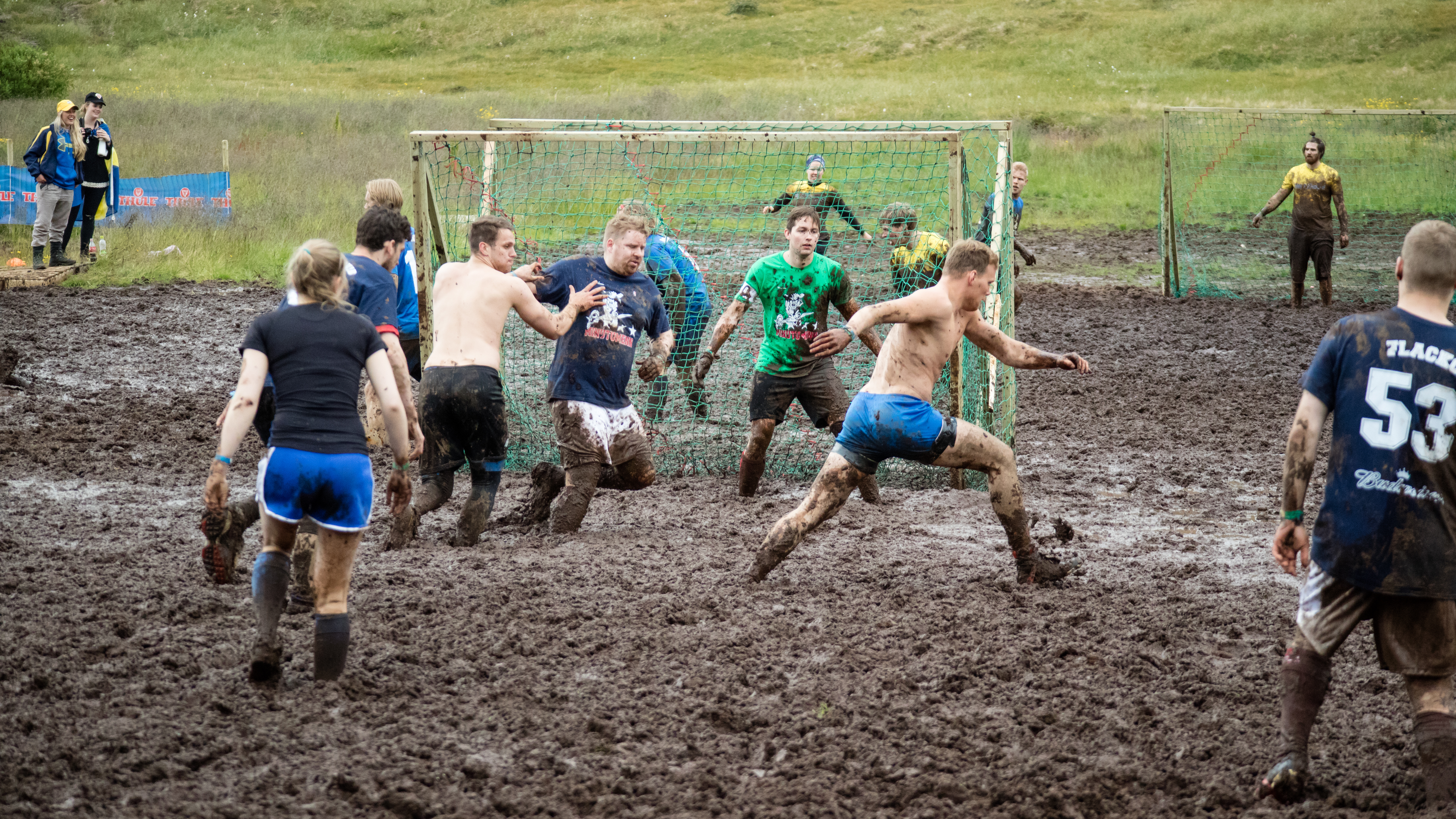
- A swamp football match
- Highest governing body: None (regional organizations)
- First played: 1998, Finland

Characteristics
- Contact: Yes
- Team members: 6 per side
- Mixed-sex: Mixed
- Type: Outdoor
- Equipment: Football
- Venue: Bogs or swamps

Presence
- Country or region: Global
- Olympic: No

Swamp football (also called swamp soccer or suopotkupallo in Finnish) is a variant of association football played in bogs or swamps, characterized by its physically challenging environment. Originating in Finland in 1998, it was initially used as a training exercise for athletes and soldiers due to the strength required to move through boggy terrain. The sport has since spread to countries including the United Kingdom, Turkey, and Iceland, with an estimated 260 teams worldwide as of 2020. The annual Swamp Football World Championship, held in Hyrynsalmi, Finland, is the sport’s premier event, attracting international competitors.

== History ==
Swamp football was developed in Finland in 1998 as a training method for skiers, athletes, and soldiers, leveraging the resistance of bog terrain to build endurance. The first organized competition, the Finnish Swamp Football Championship, was held in 1998 in Hyrynsalmi, Kainuu, organized by local enthusiasts. The sport gained traction in the Kainuu region, known for its boggy landscapes, and by 2000, it had evolved into the Swamp Football World Championship, held annually in Hyrynsalmi.

The sport spread internationally in the early 2000s, with the United Kingdom hosting its first Swamp Soccer World Cup in 2004, organized by Swamp Soccer UK Ltd. The UK event, held in Dunoon, Scotland, ran until 2015, attracting teams from Europe and beyond. In 2016, the World Cup moved to Istanbul, Turkey, though it has not been held regularly since. As of 2025, the Finnish World Championship remains the primary global event, scheduled for 18–20 July in Hyrynsalmi.

== Rules ==
Swamp football adapts association football rules to suit bog conditions, with modifications to accommodate the muddy terrain:

- Matches consist of two halves of 10 minutes, shorter than standard football due to physical demands.
- Teams field six players (five outfield, one goalkeeper), with unlimited squad sizes and substitutions.
- There is no offside rule.
- Corner kicks, penalties, and throw-ins are executed by dropping the ball onto a chosen foot.
- The penalty area extends five metres from the goal, but goalkeepers can only hold the ball within a three-metre radius.
- Matches are played on boggy pitches, typically 60 metres long and 35 metres wide.

These rules, formalized by Finnish organizers, are used in the World Championship and most international events.

== Tournaments ==
The Swamp Football World Championship, held annually in Hyrynsalmi, Finland, is the sport’s most prominent event, organized since 1998. The 2025 edition, scheduled for 18–20 July, includes men’s, women’s, and mixed divisions, with teams from Finland, Sweden, Russia, and other countries. The event attracts around 200 teams and thousands of spectators, hosted at the Ukkohalla resort.

From 2004 to 2015, the Swamp Soccer World Cup was held in Dunoon, Scotland, organized by Swamp Soccer UK Ltd. At its peak, it drew over 100 teams from 25 countries, with sponsors including Müller (FRijj) and Ardbeg. The event moved to Istanbul, Turkey, in 2016, but no further World Cups have been documented in subsequent years. Smaller tournaments have emerged in Iceland and Sweden, though they lack the scale of the Finnish championship.

As of 2020, approximately 260 swamp football teams were active globally, primarily in Finland, Sweden, and the UK.

== Media coverage ==
Swamp football has received attention from international media for its unique setting and physicality. The Finnish World Championship has been covered by Reuters (2018), which highlighted its muddy appeal, and The Guardian (2014), which noted its cult following. The Scottish World Cup garnered BBC coverage in 2011, emphasizing its international participation. In 2025, Finnish organizers used social media to promote the upcoming championship, with posts on X noting its growing fanbase. The sport’s novelty has also led to features in sports documentaries and travel blogs, though it remains a niche activity.
