= Walking football =

Variation of association football

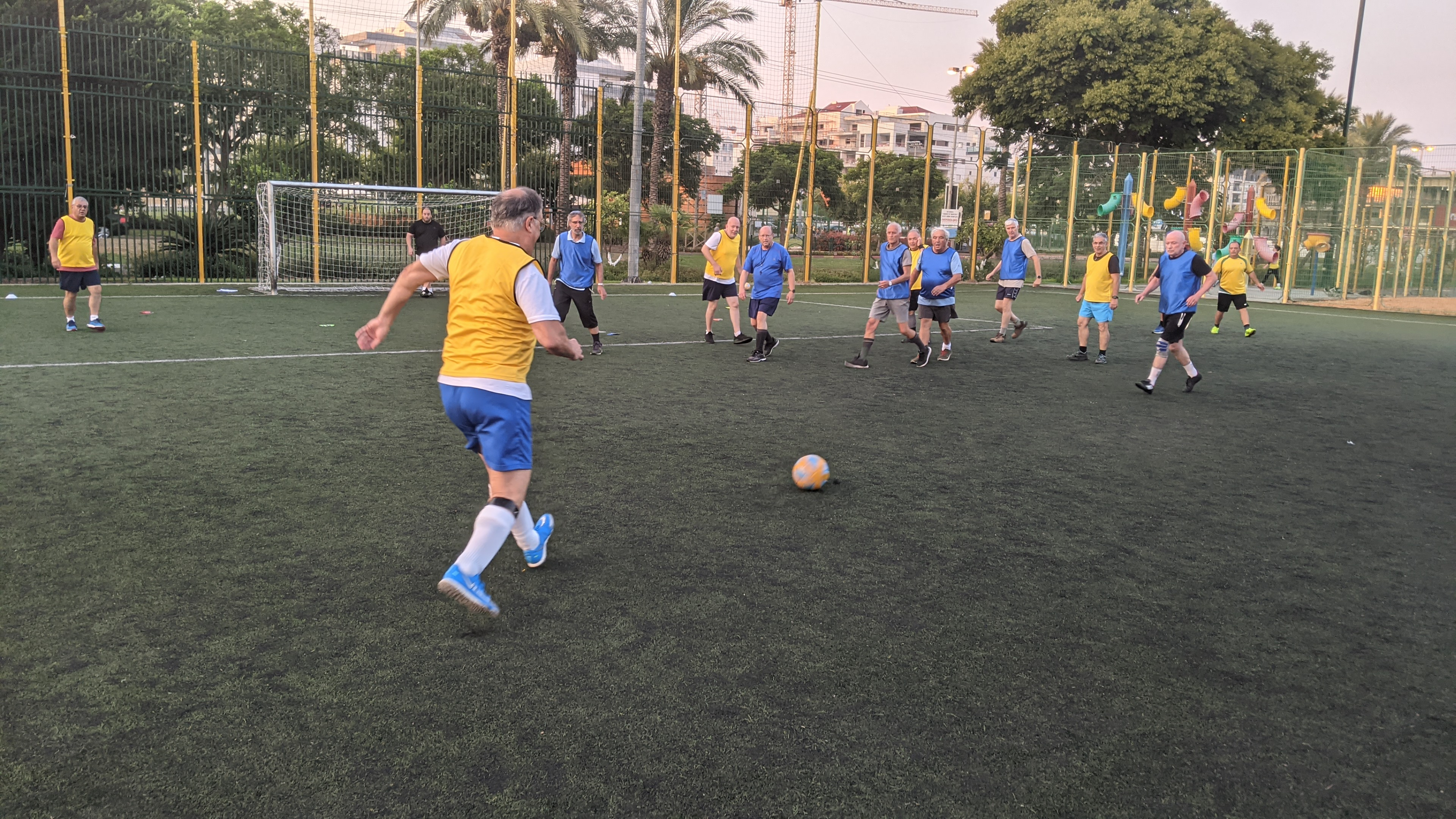
- Walking football game
- Highest governing body: The Walking Football Association
- First played: 2011

Characteristics
- Contact: No
- Mixed-sex: No
- Type: Indoor or outdoor

Walking football is a variant of association football invented in 2011 which is played by thousands of teams all over the UK and the world.

== Overview ==
It is aimed at keeping people aged over 50 involved with football if, due to a lack of mobility or for other reasons, they are not able to play the traditional game. The sport can be played both indoors and outdoors. Coverage of a walking football session initially believed to be an April Fools' joke, on Sky Sports News and in a documentary aired on Sky Sports Football in October 2017, led to several other clubs taking up this version of the game. It has since become a craze.

There are now thousands of teams and sessions all over the UK with players now featuring in over-50s, over 60s, over-65s, over-70s, and over-75s teams. The sport has also proved popular with women over 40.

Though based on association football (albeit with more than 50 differences), the key difference from standard football is that if a player runs then they concede a free kick to the other side. This restriction, together with a ban on slide tackles, is aimed both at avoiding injuries and facilitating the playing of the sport by those who are physically disadvantaged. The manner in which the sport is played promotes cardiovascular fitness whilst reducing stress on the body. It also helps participants maintain an active lifestyle.

In walking football the game was originally played without goalkeepers (though goalkeepers now play in some variations) and, crucially, the ball must never be kicked above head height. Different footballs are used in the indoor and the outdoor variations of the sport. When played indoors, a size 4 futsal ball is used. Outdoor games involve a traditional football. The size of the pitch can vary to suit different locations. The length should be from 20 to 40 yards and the width between 15 and 30 yards.

The sport was created in 2011 by John Croot, Chair of Chesterfield Football Club, but came to wider public attention in July 2014, when Barclays Bank aired a television advertisement featuring walking football to promote its services.

Similar slower-paced sports include walking netball, walking rugby, walking basketball, walking hockey (based on field hockey) and walking cricket.
