= Paper football =

Tabletop game loosely based on American football

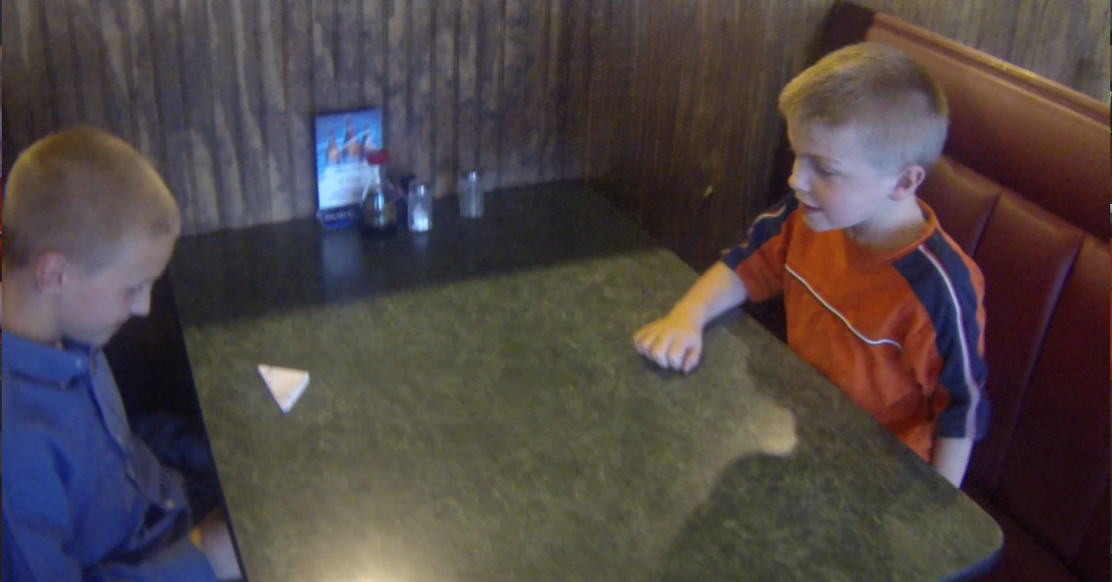
Children playing a game of paper football

Paper football (also called fingering football, flick football, tabletop football, thump football, Chinese football, or freaky football) refers to a table-top game, loosely based on American football, in which a sheet of paper folded into a small triangle is slid back and forth across a table top by two opponents. This game is widely practiced for entertainment, mostly by students in primary, middle school (junior high), and high school age in the United States. Though its origin is in dispute, it was widely played at churches in Madison, Wisconsin in the early 1970s. The youth group at Grace Baptist Church held weekly events and competitions including monthly championships.

== Gameplay ==
The game uses a piece of paper folded into a triangle, called the "ball". The starting player begins by kicking off the ball. To perform a kickoff, the ball is placed on the table, suspended by one of the player's hands with the index finger on the upper tip of the ball, then the player flicks the ball with the other hand's thumb and index finger. If the ball ends up flying off the table or hanging on the edge of the table, the kickoff is redone. If the ball lands on the table without reaching the edge of the receiving player's side, players take turns pushing it with a steady fast motion towards the opponent's side.

The player scores points by getting the ball hanging on the edge of the opponent's side, called a touchdown. Every time a touchdown is scored, the player who scored has a chance to make a field goal, which has that player flick the ball as in the kickoff through the opponent's goal post, formed by placing both wrists parallel to the table on the edge, with the tips of both thumbs touching each other and both index fingers pointing straight upward. If the field goal is successful, the kicking player scores one point. The player who conceded points starts the next kickoff.

The game ends based on the agreed-upon rules, be it time limit (the player with the most points when the predetermined amount of time has elapsed wins) or score limit (the first player to reach the predetermined score threshold wins).

== See also ==
- Penny football
- Button football
- Tabletop football
- Blow football
