= Roller soccer =

Sport discipline

RollerSoccer, Futins, Football Skating, Roller Foot
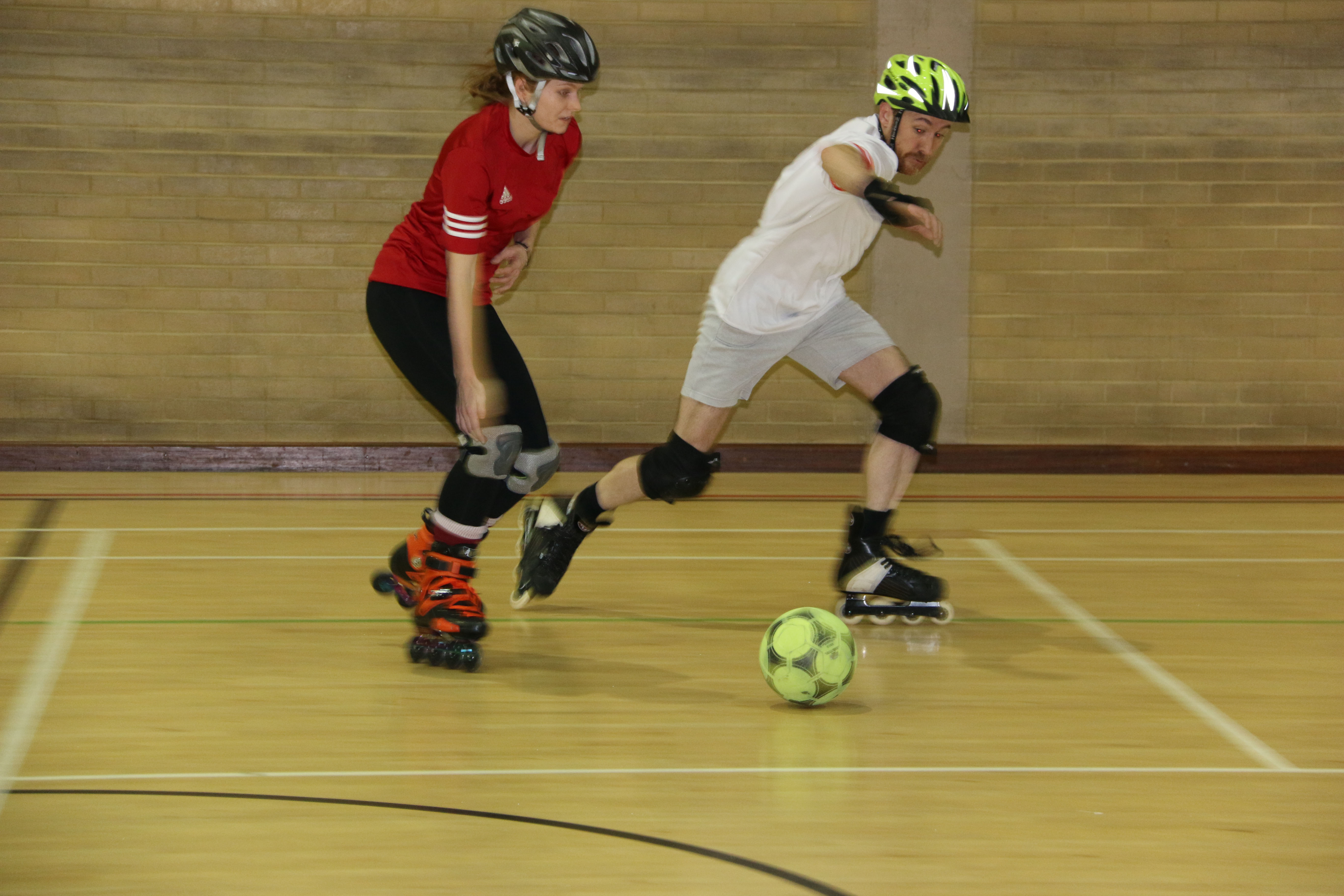
- A practice session between London Fire Rollersoccer players
- Highest governing body: Federation International Football Skating (FIFS); RollerSoccer International Federation (RSIF); Futins International Federation (FIF)
- First played: Late 19th century (Midlands district of the United Kingdom in 1882)
- Registered players: 200

Characteristics
- Contact: Yes
- Team members: 5 per side
- Type: Team sport, ball sport, roller sport
- Equipment: Football (or soccer ball), inline skates or roller skates, pads
- Venue: Roller rink, 5 a side football court, Outside sports court

Presence
- Country or region: Africa, Asia, Australia, Europe, North America, South America
- Olympic: No
- Paralympic: No

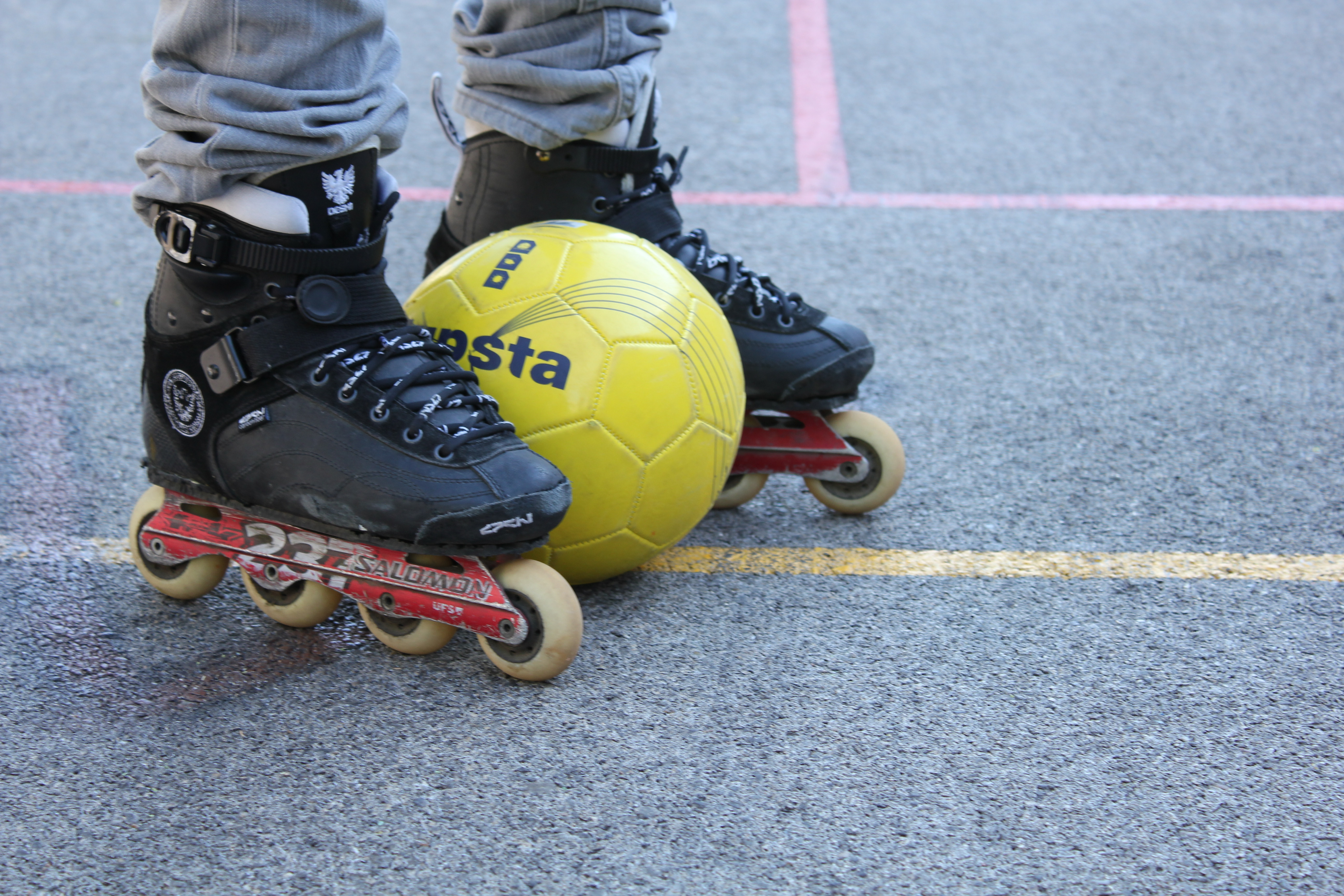
Roller soccer uses a regular soccer ball

RollerSoccer, Futins, Football Skating, Roller Foot or roller football is a version of association football (soccer) played on roller skates.

== History ==
The sport was created in the English Midlands in 1882 and the first documented match was a game between local rivals Derby and Burton on 30 January of that year. A 1934 game at London's Forest Gate Roller Rink, between two teams of female players, was filmed for an item on Pathé News. Over a decade later Billboard reported in 1949 that it had been revived in Detroit, having disappeared for more than thirty years.

The game re-emerged serendipitously in San Francisco in 1995, when a soccer ball rolled into the street while Zack Phillips was inline skating. He instinctively kicked the ball with his skates and immediately envisioned sporting potential. Later that day he brought his own soccer ball to his group of inline skate friends who had previously kicked pine cones while skating. In 1996 Zack established the RollerSoccer International Federation and launched a website and with the help of skate friends. By 1998, it was described as "well established in some areas". In the early 2000s the Futins (Futebol de Patins) organization established by Almir Falcão in Pernambuco, Brazil connected with the RollerSoccer organization.

The first RollerSoccer World Cup was held in London in 2003 and again in 2004 whereafter the tournament was rotated around the world with European and National events also emerging. Fourteen (14) RollerSoccer World Cups or Club World Cups were held through 2019. Post-COVID the world championships are resuming as the Football Skating World Cup 8-18 December in Trabzon, Turkey and a Club World Cup during 2023.

The country with most active players and the highest number of teams is France, with UMS Easy Riders currently the defending Club World Cup Champion. Skaters on inline and roller skates on every continent (except Antarctica) have played soccer/football on skates. Australia and Belgium have interesting history. African and Asian teams have been emerging for many years.

== Federations ==
Since 2016, the sport of RollerSoccer/Futins is governed by 3 world federations: the combined yet late Federation International Football Skating (FIFS) and the early Futins International Federation (FIF) and RollerSoccer International Federation (RSIF).

== World championships ==
=== RollerSoccer World Cup ===
The RollerSoccer World Cup was organised by the RollerSoccer International Federation, with help from the community that was using Futins' rules.

- 2003 (London) :
  - 1st Holland NED
  - 2nd Germany GER
- 2004 (London) :
  - 1st Germany GER
  - 2nd Holland NED
- 2005 (Germany) :
  - 1st Germany GER
- 2006 (Nuremberg) :
  - 1st Planet Roller FRA
  - 2nd AMSCAS Marseille FRA
- 2007 (Paris) :
  - 1st AMSCAS Marseille FRA
  - ??
  - 3rd Planet Roller FRA
  - ??
  - 5th UTOPIE Toulon FRA
- 2008 (San Francisco) :
  - 1st Away Team USA
  - 2nd AMSCAS Marseille FRA
  - 3rd Euroland EUR
  - 4th Planet Roller FRA

=== RollerSoccer Club World Cup ===
The RollerSoccer Club World Cup is what replaced the RollerSoccer World Cup in 2009. As the name would suggest, this one allows clubs to play instead of national teams.

- 2009 (Brussels) :
  - 1st AMSCAS Marseille FRA
  - 2nd Shark Épinay Roller Soccer FRA
  - 3rd Planet Roller FRA
  - 4th UTOPIE Toulon FRA
- 2010 (Piacenza):
  - 1st AMSCAS Marseille FRA
- 2011 (Recife) :
  - 1st AMSCAS Marseille FRA
  - 2nd Sport Clube Recife BRA
  - 3rd Recife Futins Clube BRA
- 2012 (Marseille) :
  - 1st AMSCAS Marseille FRA
  - 2nd Rollera Ljubljana SVN
  - 3rd Recife Futins Clube BRA
  - 4th Shark Épinay Roller Soccer FRA
- 2013 (Amsterdam) :
  - 1st AMSCAS Marseille FRA
  - 2nd RSCT Toulon FRA
  - 3rd Phénix, Marseille FRA
  - 4th Paris RF FRA
- 2015 (Toulon) :
  - 1st RSCT Toulon FRA
  - 2nd Phenix Marseille FRA
  - Semi finalists: Rollera Ljubljana SVN, AMSCAS Marseille FRA
- 2017 (Marseille) :
  - 1st Phénix, Marseille FRA
  - 2nd UMS Easy Riders Pontault-Combault FRA
  - 3rd AMSCAS Marseille FRA
  - 4th RSCT Toulon FRA
- 2019 (Brussels) :
  - 1st UMS Easy Riders Pontault-Combault FRA
  - 2nd Roller Holland Amsterdam NLD
  - 3rd Shinobis Riders Brussels BEL
  - 4th Phénix, Marseille FRA

=== Football Skating World Cup / FIFS World Cup ===
The Football Skating World Cup or FIFS World Cup is the world cup hosted by the Federation International Football Skating. This tourney, however, uses the Futins rules instead of the RollerSoccer ones.

- 2024 (Turkey) :
  - 2024 Turkey 15th
  - 1st Senior IRAN IRN
  - 2nd Senior UAE UAE
  - 3rd SeniorBelarus BLR
  - 1st JuniorTurkiye TR
  - 2nd JuniorEgypt EGY
  - 3rd JuniorGhana GHA
