= 3v3 Soccer =

Variety of soccer

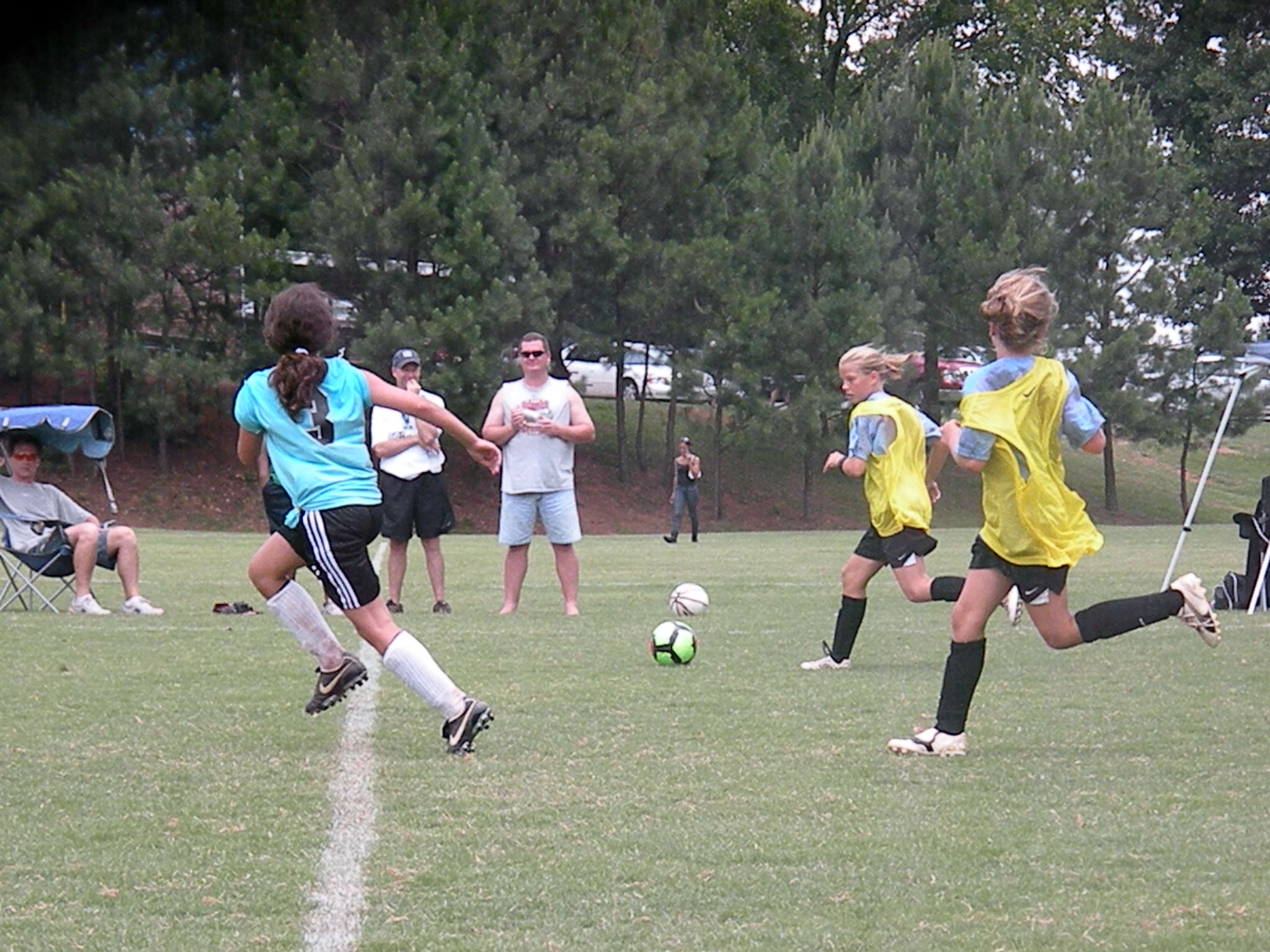
A children's 3v3 Association Football tournament game in Atlanta, Georgia

3v3 Association Football is a modified form of association football played between two teams. Each team may only have three players on the field at a time. This style of football is more commonly referred to as a "small-sided" game, as compared to a full-sided game with larger teams. The field used is smaller than a regular football pitch; instead, it is typically 30 by 40 metres (98 by 131 ft), although these dimensions vary when the game is played indoors due to the varied styles and sizes of indoor pitches. It uses a much smaller goal than full-sided football and in most 3v3 there is no goalkeeper, an exception being 3v3 micro football.

3v3 is a faster paced and higher scoring game than traditional full-sided football. The speed of the attack, the use of triangulation, and the strategies bring aspects of hockey into the game. The quick shift from one end of the field to the other after a goal is scored, or upon loss of possession is reminiscent of basketball. It requires the blending of individual skills with teamwork. The sport's popularity is attributed to every member of the team getting equal playing time, and roughly equal touches on the ball. All players on the field are a part of the play. Because of the speed of the game, and the fact that players are constantly in motion, there are frequent substitutions. A typical player may be rotated on six times or more in one game. There are no permanently assigned positions as there are in full-sided football, giving each team member equal status and equal importance. This helps to develop individual skills.

== Tournaments ==
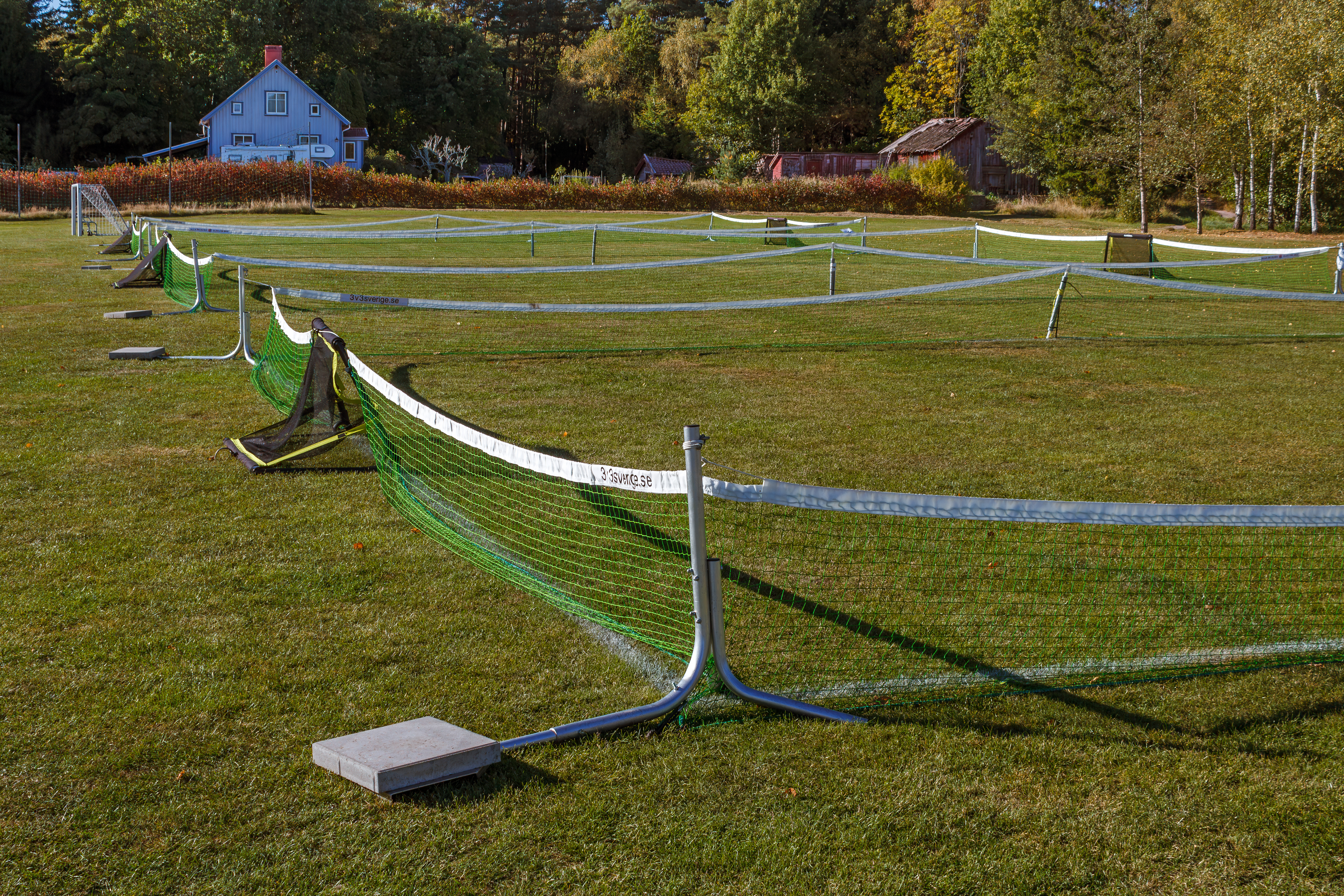
Nets set up for 3v3 Football in Brastad, Sweden.

In 2008 there were three major tours in the United States: Colorado based Kick it 3v3 Soccer with their World Championships held at the ESPN Wide World of Sports Complex; Utah-based 3v3 Live, and Florida-based Challenge3v3.

Nike helped to popularize the sport with its international Joga3 Joga Bonito Tour in 2006, in which teams qualified at local events around the World, culminating in a 3v3 World Cup played in Brazil. In 2023, the popularity of 3v3 football was on the rise in countries such as Serbia and Australia. Since the beginning of 2023, many tournaments have emerged for players across various age groups. These tournaments include Kick It 3v3 Soccer and 3v3 Live Soccer Tour.
