= Billy Pappas =

American table football and poker player (born 1984)

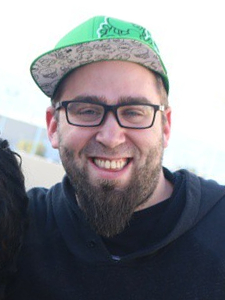
- Nickname: Bony Fish
- Born: William Pappaconstantinou; September 28, 1984 (age 42); Lowell, Massachusetts

World Series of Poker
- Bracelet: None
- Final table: 1
- Money finish: 1
- Highest WSOP Main Event finish: 5th, 2014

William Pappaconstantinou (born September 28, 1984) commonly known as Billy Pappas is an American professional table football player and amateur poker player from Lowell, Massachusetts. He won the Tornado format Men's Singles ITSF WCS in 2005, 2006, 2009 and 2013 and also won the Men's Singles Tornado Champions in 2009 and 2011. He has been ranked among the best Tornado table football players in the world since the age of 20. He often partners with Tony Spredeman and Glen Murray for doubles. In poker, he made final table in 2014 World Series of Poker Main Event finishing in fifth place earning $2,143,794.

Pappas formerly worked as a poker dealer. He is known for wearing a green Yoshi cap which he attributes to the game Super Smash Bros.

As of 2016, his live poker tournament winning exceed $2,150,000.

== See also ==
- List of world table football champions
