= Tony Spredeman =

American professional table football player

Tony Spredeman (born September 19, 1984) is an American professional table football player and current World Foosball Tour (WFT) Open Singles World Champion.

A multiple-time world champion, Spredeman has competed at the highest level of professional foosball since the early 2000s. He won his first Open Singles World Championship in 2003 at age 18 and has won ten Open Singles World Championships overall.

== Early life ==
Spredeman grew up in Milwaukee, Wisconsin, in a family closely connected to competitive foosball. His father, Bud Spredeman, was a tournament foosball player, and Tony began accompanying him to foosball tournaments at a young age where he developed an early obsession with the sport. He eventually began competing alongside his father, and the two have continued to play doubles together throughout Tony's career. In 2021, Tony and Bud won Open Doubles at the Beach Town Beatdown, and they have continued to compete together in regional and national events.

== Career ==
Spredeman emerged as a leading player on the American professional foosball circuit in the early 2000s. In 2003, at age 18, he won his first Tornado World Open Singles Championship, defeating Louis Cartwright in the final. Tournament records named his run through the event the 2003 World Championships "Performance of the Year."

In 2008, Spredeman won his second Tornado World Open Singles Championship, defeating Belgian player Frédéric Collignon. He also won the 2008 U.S. Open Singles championship, earning qualification to compete as a U.S. national champion at the ITSF World Championships.

At the 2009 ITSF World Championships, Spredeman finished second in men's singles behind Yannick Correia of Luxembourg. He also earned a bronze medal in men's doubles with Tom Yore. The United States won the men's World Cup team competition at the same event.

In 2025, Spredeman was inducted into the U.S. Table Soccer Hall of Fame.

In 2026, Spredeman won the Open Singles championship at the WFT World Championships of Foosball in New Orleans, Louisiana. He defeated Kevin Romero in the final stage of the tournament, with Brandon Moreland and Mario Ariganello finishing tied for third.

== Playing style ==
Spredeman primarily plays as a forward. He is particularly associated with his five-bar passing and his use of the snake shot, also known as the rollover shot. His primary shooting technique has sometimes been described as a "walking snake" shot.

== Foosballers ==
Spredeman was one of the principal subjects of the 2019 documentary film Foosballers, which follows six professional table football players as they prepare for the Tornado World Championships. The film features Spredeman alongside players including Todd Loffredo, Ryan Moore, Robert Mares, Cindy Head and Terry Rue.

Apple TV lists Spredeman, Loffredo and Moore among the film's starring cast.

== Major accomplishments ==
- Tornado Open Singles World Champion — 2003
- Tornado Open Singles World Champion — 2008
- Tornado Open Singles World Champion — 2013
- Tornado Open Doubles World Champion — 2013, with Robert Mares
- Tornado Open Singles World Champion — 2015
- Tornado Open Singles World Champion — 2016
- Tornado Open Doubles World Champion — 2016, with Robert Mares
- Tornado Open Singles World Champion — 2017
- Tornado Open Singles World Champion — 2018
- Tornado Open Singles World Champion — 2019
- Tornado Open Singles World Champion — 2023
- WFT Open Singles World Champion — 2026
- Member of multiple gold medal-winning United States World Cup teams
- U.S. Table Soccer Hall of Fame inductee — 2025
- ITSF world No. 1 — Open Singles, Open Doubles and Open Combined — 2026
- World Foosball Tour No. 1-ranked men's singles player — 2026

== Filmography ==
Year	Title	Role
2019	Foosballers	Himself

== See also ==
- List of world table football champions
