= Rob Atha =

British table football player

Rob Atha (born 1986) is a table football/foosball player from the UK, previously ranked 1st in the world and regularly ranking in the top 5 of the International Table Soccer Federation (ITSF) rankings. Atha has been the number #1 ranked player in the UK since the early 2000s.

== Overview ==
Born in 1986, Rob learned the sport at a young age at the Rainbow snooker club in his hometown of Manchester. He won his first Open Singles title at a UK ranking tournament at the age of 13. This and other early tournament successes led to Rob being dubbed the "Wonderkid"., leading to an appearance on the BBC children's show Blue Peter in 1999.

He became the ITSF Men's Doubles World Champion in 2009 along with fellow UK player Joe Hamilton. Following on from this success, Rob appeared on various British TV shows including Newsround on BBC1 as well as gaining his second Blue Peter badge. During this appearance a clip was shown of his first appearance, which was made as a result of his initial exploits.

He has reached the finals of the ITSF World Cup on 3 other occasions (once again with Hamilton; once with his father Boris; and once in Singles). He has won numerous international tournaments on different tables and is cited by fooscaster Jim Stevens (the recognised 'voice of foosball') as being one of the greatest multi-table players ever to play the sport.

Rob has been sponsored by various companies such as the energy drink giant Red Bull and Heineken, being the face of their international staff table football tournament for many years. He is featured in the 2016 documentary Foosball: past - present - future at IMDb.

== See also ==
- List of world table football champions
