= Tony Bacon =

American table football player

- Occupation: table football player

Tony Bacon was an American veteran professional table football player. He was a world champion on the Dynamo table in three successive years from 1985 to 1987.

== See also ==
- List of world table football champions
