= David Adkisson =

David Adkisson may refer to:

- David Von Erich, real name David Alan Adkisson, (1958–1984), professional wrestler
- Jim David Adkisson, perpetrator of the 2008 Knoxville Unitarian Universalist church shooting

== See also ==
- Adkisson (surname)
