= Tornado (table football) =

Tornado is a brand of table football (foosball) tables that has been used in the World Championships since 1986. The original Tornado model was created by engineer Bob Furr. The Tornado brand has been manufactured by Valley-Dynamo since 1999, and is a market leader in both coin-operated and home recreation room markets. Tornado Foosball Tables are used in the most important championships of the U.S.A. Tornado tables are sanctioned for official play by the following governing bodies:

- International Table Soccer Federation
- United States Table Soccer Association
- United States Table Soccer Federation
- Valley International Foosball Association
