= Valley-Dynamo =

Gaming and sporting goods manufacturer

Valley-Dynamo, Inc.
- Industry: manufacturing
- Founded: 1947
- Founder: Earl Feddick
- Headquarters: Richland Hills, Texas, United States
- Products: gaming and sporting goods
- Website: Official website

Valley-Dynamo, Inc. is a gaming and sporting goods manufacturing company. It has been the dominant manufacturer of coin-operated pool tables in North America for over 6 decades, and produces the US-ubiquitous Valley brand and decreasingly common Dynamo brand (once a competitor). The company also manufactures other market-leader brand names, including Tornado brand table football (foosball), Dynamo air hockey, and Champion indoor shuffleboard tables, as well as Sun Glo shuffleboard equipment, for both the home and coin-op markets.

The company has distributors in some two dozen countries. Annual sales were up to US$15–17 mil, as of May 2009.

== History ==
As Valley Co., the original company was founded by Earl Feddick in 1947 in Bay City, Michigan, where it remained under the auspices of a series of controlling companies including Kidde Inc., U.S. Industries, and Fenway Partners with Rickett still the majority shareholder. In 1999, then known as Valley Recreation Products, Valley absorbed and merged with both Tornado Table Sports and Dynamo Corp., and centralized operations at the Dynamo facilities in Richland Hills, Texas (a Dallas-Ft. Worth suburb).

The increasingly market-dominant enterprise was bought for US$34.5 million by, and was made a subsidiary of, Brunswick Corporation in 2003, as Valley-Dynamo LLC. Brunswick moved Valley-Dynamo's manufacturing operations to Reynosa, Mexico in 2006. In 2009, Valley-Dynamo "was acquired by a limited partnership controlled by Kelye Stites," owner of Champion Shuffleboard Ltd., "and other businesses in the Dallas/Fort Worth area." The sale amount was not disclosed, but was rumored to be surprisingly low ($3 to 5 million). Stites, the son-in-law of Valley Co. founder Rickett, decided to move pool and air hockey table production from Mexico back to Texas. Under the new partnership, in which Stites is the majority owner, Valley-Dynamo absorbed Champion's shuffleboard brand rather than vice versa, with Stites citing Valley-Dynamo's widespread brand name recognition.

== Leagues ==
Valley created, and wholly owns the international amateur Valley National 8-Ball League Association (VNEA). All VNEA matches must be played on Operator/Charter Holder owned pool tables only. The company also founded the Valley International Foosball Association (VIFA). The majority of American Poolplayers Association (APA) matches are also played on Valley-Dynamo tables, including the APA International Championships, although APA has no rules with regard to what brand or size of table is used.

== See also ==
- List of sporting goods manufacturers
