= Fabio Cassanelli =

Italian Table football player

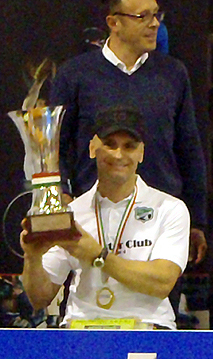
- Fabio Cassanelli in 2012

Personal information
- Born: 1973 (age 52–53) Italy
Medal record
Representing Italy
ITSF World Competition
Gold medal – first place	ITSF WORLD CUP Disabled TEAM 2013
Gold medal – first place	ITSF World Champion Disabled doubles 2012
Gold medal – first place	ITSF World Champion Disabled doubles 2011
Gold medal – first place	ITSF World Champion Disabled doubles 2010
Gold medal – first place	ITSF World Champion Disabled doubles 2009
Gold medal – first place	ITSF World Champion Disabled doubles 2008
Italian Competition
Gold medal – first place	FPICB Italian CUP 2012
Gold medal – first place	FPICB National Meeting 2011
Gold medal – first place	FICB Disabled Double 2010
Gold medal – first place	FICB Disabled Double 2009
Gold medal – first place	FICB Disabled Double 2008

Fabio Cassanelli is an Italian Table football player. He is a multiple world champion. Partnering with Francesco Bonanno, he has won the gold medal for Disabled Doubles category at the ITSF World Championship (Nantes) in 2008, 2009, 2010, 2011, 2012 and is titleholder of the World CUP 2013.
