= Johnny Horton (foosball) =

American table football player

Johnny Horton is an American veteran professional Table football player who made his debut in 1975. He is a multiple World Champion and has 11 major titles.

== See also ==
- List of world table football champions
