= Valley National 8-Ball League Association =

- VNEA logo
- Abbreviation: VNEA
- Formation: 1979
- Type: Non-profit amateur sport league
- Purpose: "To promote the game of pool on coin-operated equipment
- Headquarters: Bay City, Michigan
- Location: United States predominantly, plus Australia, Bahamas, Bermuda, Canada, England, Germany, Finland, Mexico, New Zealand, Spain
- Coordinates: 43.601079°N 83.900665°W
- Region served: International
- Members: Individual players (league members), Valley-Dynamo distributors (league franchise holders), equipment suppliers and manufacturers (league sponsors)
- Official language: English
- President: Marshall Kohtz
- Main organ: Board of Directors
- Affiliations: Valley-Dynamo Inc.
- Website: VNEA.com

The Valley National 8-Ball League Association (VNEA) is one of the world's largest amateur pool leagues. As of 2020, there are nearly 100,000 individual members in some 1,400 weekly local leagues playing in over 10,000 pool halls, bars and other venues in around 400 different cities, towns and suburbs in 36 U.S. states, and abroad.

The organization was founded in the United States in 1979 by equipment manufacturer Valley-Dynamo as the Valley 8-Ball League Association. It was later known as the Valley National 8-Ball Association, a name the league still uses sometimes Despite its name, it is no longer just national, having leagues in eleven countries, nor limited to the game of eight-ball, as nine-ball is also sponsored. The annual, week-long VNEA International Pool Championships are held in Las Vegas, Nevada. The organization is headquartered in Bay City, Michigan. As of 2020 the president of the VNEA is Marshall Kohtz.

== Business model ==
Unlike most leagues, VNEA is tied to a specific brand of pool table, namely those of the Valley-Dynamo company of Richland Hills, Texas. As with most leagues, the league activity in any given geographic area (such as a city and its suburbs, a quadrant of a very large city, or an entire suburban county) is coordinated by an exclusive franchisee. In VNEA terms, these are "Charter Holders". All VNEA Charter Holders are authorized Valley-Dynamo distributors. All venues participating in the Charter Holder's area VNEA leagues must rent or lease their tables from the Charter Holder. As a consequence, VNEA leagues are mostly found in areas where bars and other establishments tend to rent tables from Valley distributors, whereas in other areas where the majority of venues own their pool tables outright other leagues are more common.

The VNEA has active leagues in several countries other than the United States, all of which send teams and individual competitors to the annual International Championships.

== Format ==
VNEA matches must be played on Valley- or Dynamo-brand 7 by 3.5 ft (2.1 by 1.1 m) "bar box" coin-operated pool tables, considerably smaller than the 9 by 4.5 ft (2.7 by 1.4 m) regulation tables used by professionals and in some other amateur leagues.

Regular VNEA league matches are, like those of the BCA Pool League, played in round-robin format between two teams of either five or (less commonly) three players each, with each player on the home team playing one game (frame) versus each player on the visiting team.

VNEA playing rules were originally derived largely from informal American "bar pool", but have become increasingly consistent with the standard rules promulgated by the World Pool-Billiard Association, and used by some other major leagues, including the BCAPL and American Poolplayers Association. Local VNEA charter holders have a great deal of leeway in how games are handicapped, how players are sorted into skill-based divisions, and even in a few cases as to which rules apply. Charter holders often hold regular individual, non-team tournaments and other special events.

Many tournaments have three skill divisions (Regular, Intermediate, and Masters), and provide for individual, mixed-gender scotch doubles, and team play. The Internationals provide for multiple levels of awards and trophies; a team might lose the main competition but may have a chance to win against other eliminated competitors in a "Hard Luck" division a few days later. The Internationals also provide a Classic division for seniors. Singles play is divided into open and women's subdivisions; women are not required to play in the women's division, but men are prohibited from it.

== VNEA International Pool Championships ==
The organization's flagship event is held in Las Vegas annually and draws around 6,000 players each year. The week-long event uses upwards of 300-tables and also features numerous vendors and training sessions, as well as internal league training seminars for referees and instructors.

The tournaments begin with singles eight-ball competition followed by doubles and finally the team championships. Singles and team competition are divided into divisions based on previous performance in prior years' championships, with most teams (including first-time participants) being placed in the Open division, with the Intermediate and Masters divisions being progressively exclusive. There is no other form of handicapping at the Internationals, a marked difference from the championships in many other leagues including BCAPL and APA. Men's and Women's singles are separate championships. Doubles must be one woman and one man from any team in any charter. Five-person teams may be mixed-gender, and must be composed of at least three players from the same charter. Teams eliminated from the competition early may be eligible to compete in secondary, tertiary and even quaternary competitions (the Sportsmen's, Hard Luck and Extreme Hard Luck divisions). There are other side events, such as 16-player mini-tournaments in eight-ball and nine-ball, trick shot challenges, instructional seminars, a grand opening party and a closing banquet.

== Special programs ==
While they are not always held at the same times and venues as adult events, VNEA has a large and active series of youth tournaments. In some areas (especially the very VNEA-active Midwest) these are backed by youth training programs and even entire youth leagues. As of 2020, there are around 5,000 youth players in 14 U.S. states and 3 other countries, forming around 100 leagues using a total of about 500 venues.
