= Adkisson =

Adkisson is a surname. Notable people with the surname include:

- James Adkisson (born 1980), American football tight end
- Janet Hopps Adkisson (born 1934), American professional tennis player
- Jim David Adkisson (born 1950), perpetrator of the 2008 Tennessee Unitarian Church shooting
- Perry Adkisson (1929–2020), Chancellor of the Texas A&M University System
- Richard B. Adkisson (1932–2011), chief justice of the Arkansas Supreme Court
- Tommy Adkisson (fl. 1990s–2020s), American professional Foosball player

See also

- Adkisson SJ-1 Head Skinner, single-seater gull-wing sports plane built 1957 by Earl and Jerry Adkisson
- Von Erich family, a family of American professional wrestlers with the birth name of Adkisson
