= Frédéric Collignon =

Frédéric Collignon (born 13 December 1975) is a table football player from Liege, Belgium.

In the 15 year period from 1997-2012, Collignon was the dominant player in table football worldwide, winning the ITSF multi-table World Championships on 7 occasions; World Championships on Tornado tables on 5 occasions, and other ITSF recognised tables including Bonzini, Garlando, Leonhart, Roberto Sport, Jupiter, Eurosoccer, etc. In doubles tournaments in the United States, Collignon established a dominant partnership with Todd Loffredo, winning Open Doubles in the Tornado World Championships on 7 occasions.

Having won more world championships on more tables, than any other player in history, and additionally being the only European player ever to have been dominant in the United States, Collignon is regarded by most as the greatest player in the history of the sport, although Collignon himself instead regards Loffredo as the greatest.

Collignon announced his retirement at the end of 2012, at a point when he was the reigning ITSF multi-table World Champion in Singles and Doubles; Tornado World Champion; and having led Belgium to the World Cup. Nevertheless, from semi-retirement he continues to win whenever he plays, including the 2013 Leonhart and P4P World Championships, and 2014 Bonzini World Championships.

== See also ==
- List of world table football champions
