= Todd Loffredo =

Todd Loffredo is an American veteran professional Table football player. He is a multiple World Champion and often partners with Frédéric Collignon in Doubles. He started his career as a forward but plays both goalie and forward in doubles. Frédéric Collignon considers him the best table football player in the world. In 2005 he was inducted to the Table Soccer Hall of Fame.

He is featured in two documentaries about table soccer: Foosball: past - present - future from 2016 and Foosballers from 2019.

== See also ==
- List of world table football champions
