= Valley International Foosball Association =

The Valley International Foosball Association (VIFA) is an American "association of coin machine operators, foosball table manufacturer and foosball players, working together to provide increased interest in the game of foosball". The league is headquartered in Bay City, Michigan, and was founded by game equipment manufacturer Valley-Dynamo. 11th VIFA World Championship was held in 2007.

VIFA works in association with the ITSF to promote the Foosball World Championships and World Championship Series events (having hosted the World Championships previously).

VIFA is also closely associated with the USTSA (United States Table Soccer Association), and the USTSF (United States Table Soccer Federation) is a member. As such, VIFA has a growing membership in the United States, Canada and other countries.
