= Pfitschigogerl =

Pfitschigogerl (also: Fitschigogerl) is Austrian slang for a children's game that is a form of table football (foosball) played with coins and rulers.
