= List of world table football champions =

This article is a list of male, female and national teams world champions in foosball.

The International Table Soccer Federation (ITSF) since 2004 has held a World Championships annually or bi-annually, with the winning players and teams recognised as the best international multi-table players and teams of that period. World Series events are held for ITSF-recognised tables (Leonhart, Garlando, Bonzini, Roberto Sport and Tornado), usually annually.

In the United States (International Foosball Promotions (IFP)) since 1974, the World Championships are held on the Tornado table, with previous events having been organised on the Dynamo and Tournament Soccer tables.

Valley International Foosball Association 11th VIFA World Championship was held in 2007.

== ITSF World Championships and World Cup Champions ==
In 2015, it was decided to host this event every two years instead of annually.

The column Home table always means player's or team's choice in the finals of the tournament.

Year	Format	Location	Men Singles			Men Doubles	Nations		Women Singles	Women Doubles	Mixed Doubles
Year	Format	Location	Winner	Shooting style	Home table	Winner	Men (Division 1)	Women	Winner	Winner	Winner
2005	Multi-table	Saint-Vincent, Italy	(Belgium) Frédéric Collignon	Euro Pin		Event not created (held for the first time in 2007)	Event not created		Event not created		Event not created (held for the first time in 2019)
2006	Multi-table	Saint-Vincent, Italy	(Belgium) Frédéric Collignon	Euro Pin		Event not created (held for the first time in 2007)	Event not created		(Switzerland) Samantha Di Paolo	Event not created	Event not created (held for the first time in 2019)
2006	Multi-table	Hamburg, Germany	---	---	---	Event not created (held for the first time in 2007)	Austria	Event not created	---		Event not created (held for the first time in 2019)
2007	Multi-table	Saint-Vincent, Italy	(Belgium) Frédéric Collignon	Euro Pin		(Belgium) Frédéric Collignon, (Belgium) Ismaël Saban	Event not created		(United States) Cindy Head	(United States) Cindy Head, (United States) Dawn Duquette	Event not created (held for the first time in 2019)
2008	Multi-table	Saint-Vincent, Italy	(Belgium) Frédéric Collignon	Euro Pin		(Belgium) Frédéric Collignon, (Belgium) Ismaël Saban	Event not created		(Austria) Verena Rohrer	(Austria) Verena Rohrer, (Austria) Melissa Mosser	Event not created (held for the first time in 2019)
2009	Multi-table	Nantes, France	(Luxembourg) Yannick Correia	Snake Shot		(United Kingdom) Rob Atha, (United Kingdom) Joe Hamilton	United States	Germany	(Austria) Verena Rohrer	(Switzerland) Beatrix Ammann (Switzerland) Samantha Di Paolo	Event not created (held for the first time in 2019)
2010	Multi-table	Nantes, France	(United States) Ryan Moore	Mixed	Tornado	(United States) Dave Gummeson, (United States) Tracy McMillin	United States	France	(Germany) Sandra Ranff	(Germany) Sandra Ranff, (Germany) Simone Burkhardt	Event not created (held for the first time in 2019)
2011	Multi-table	Nantes, France	(Belgium) Frédéric Collignon	Euro Pin	Roberto Sport	(United States) Tom Yore, (United States) Brandon Moreland	United States	Austria	(Germany) Sandra Ranff	(Poland) Agnieszka Rutowska, (Poland) Agata Cwiakala	Event not created (held for the first time in 2019)
2012	Multi-table	Nantes, France	(Belgium) Frédéric Collignon	Euro Pin	Leonhart	(Belgium) Tom van de Cauter, (Belgium) Frédéric Collignon	Belgium	Germany	(Denmark) Amalie Bremer	(Poland) Agnieszka Rutowska, (Poland) Agata Cwiakala	Event not created (held for the first time in 2019)
2013	Multi-table	Nantes, France	(Austria) Kevin Hundstorfer	Snake Shot	Garlando	(Luxembourg) Carlos da Silva, (Luxembourg) Yannick Correia	France	Germany	(Bulgaria) Ekaterina Atanasova	(Austria) Verena Rohrer, (Austria) Sophie Jobstmann	Event not created (held for the first time in 2019)
2014	Multi-table	Nantes, France	(Denmark) Sven Wonsyld	Euro Pin/Snake Shot	Bonzini	(United States) Tony Spredeman, (United States) Robert Mares	United States	Denmark	(France) Estelle Jacquot	(Germany) Katrin Matsushita, (Germany) Natalie Jacob	Event not created (held for the first time in 2019)
2015	Multi-table	Turin, Italy	(Austria) Kevin Hundstorfer	Snake Shot	Garlando	(Luxembourg) Bruno Gonçalves, (Luxembourg) Yannick Correia	Luxembourg	France	(Austria) Marina Tabakovic	(Denmark) Maria Steinaa, (Denmark) Lea Kvistgaard	Event not created (held for the first time in 2019)
2017	Multi-table	Hamburg, Germany	(Germany) Thomas Haas	Snake Shot	Leonhart	(Germany) Jörg Harms, (Germany) Marvin Velasco	United States	France	(Switzerland) Cindy Kubiatowicz	(Denmark) Amalie Wolff, (Denmark) Amalie Bremer	Event not created (held for the first time in 2019)
2019	Multi-table	Murcia, Spain	(Netherlands) Twan Hermans	Euro Pin	Leonhart	(United States) Blake Robertson, (United States) Ryan Moore	United States	United States	(Austria) Marina Tabakovic	(Germany) My Linh Tran, (Germany) Lilly Andres	(France) Sébastien Zapater, (France) Anais Noel
2022	Multi-table	Nantes, France	(Germany) Ruben Heinrich	Euro Pin	Leonhart	(France) Miguel Dos Santos Lote, (France) Hervé Dos Santos Lote	Austria	Germany	(Germany) My Linh Tran	(Romania) Ecaterina Sarbulescu, (Romania) Ana Bobe	(Austria) Benjamin Willfort, (Austria) Marina Tabakovic
2025	Multi-table	Zaragoza, Spain	(Austria) Stefan Burmetler	Snake Shot	Garlando	(United States) Tony Spredeman, (United States) Robert Mares	United States	Bulgaria	(Germany) My Linh Tran	(Germany) My Linh Tran, (Germany) Maura Porrmann	(Austria) Stefan Burmetler, (Austria) Melissa Mosser

== Winners of Open Singles and Open Doubles at (Tornado, Dynamo, Tournament Soccer, WFT) World Championships ==
International Foosball Promotions (IFP) World Tournaments:

Year	Format	Location	Open Singles		Open Doubles	Women Singles	Women Doubles
Year	Format	Location	Winner	Shooting Style	Winners	Winners	Winners
1974	Tournament Soccer	Denver, United States	(United States) Mike Bowers	Pull Shot	(United States) Gordy Somekawa, (United States) Joe Purcell		(United States) Karin Gililland (von Otterstedt), (United States) Vicky Chalgren
1975	Tournament Soccer	Denver, United States	(United States) Steve Simon	Classic Pin	(United States) Dan Kaiser, (United States) Ken Rivera	(United States) Lori Schranz	(United States) Karin Gililland, (United States) Lori Schranz
1976	Tournament Soccer	Minneapolis, United States	(United States) Dan Kaiser	Classic Pin	(United States) Brent Bednar, (United States) Mike Belz	(United States) Vicki Chalgren	(United States) Karin Gilliland, (United States) Lori Schranz
1977	Tournament Soccer	St. Louis, United States	(United States) Rick Martin	Mixed	(United States) Gil Jackson, (United States) Todd Loffredo	(United States) Vicki Chalgren	(United States) Karin Gilliland, (United States) Lori Schranz
1978 - 1979	Tournament Soccer	Minneapolis, United States	(United States) Dan Kaiser	Classic Pin	(United States) Doug Furry, (United States) Jim Wiswell	(United States) Tina Rhoton (Wyatt)	(United States) Carrie Crowell, (United States) Lori Schranz
1980	Tournament Soccer	Chicago, United States	(United States) Johnny Lott	Classic Pin	(United States) Tim Burns, (United States) Mike Bowers	(United States) Carrie Crowell	(United States) Carrie Crowell, (United States) Lori Schranz
1981	Tournament Soccer	Chicago, United States	(United States) Johnny Horton	Pull Shot	(United States) Doug Furry, (United States) Johnny Lott	Event not held	
1982	Dynamo	Chicago, United States	(United States) Tom Spear	Mixed	(United States) Tony Bacon, (United States) Don Chalifoux	(United States) Cindy Head	(United States) Cindy Head, (United States) Kathy Hobson
1983	Dynamo	Chicago, United States	(United States) Ron Nevois	Mixed	(United States) Todd Loffredo, (United States) Mike Bowers	(United States) Tina Rhoton	(United States) Tina Rhoton, (United States) Tami Grabher
1984	Dynamo	Dallas, United States	(United States) Todd Loffredo	Classic Pin	(United States) Tony Bacon, (United States) Don Chalifoux	(United States) Cindy Head	(United States) Tina Rhoton, (United States) Charlene Turner
1985	Dynamo	Dallas, United States	(United States) Tony Bacon	King Pin	(United States) Johnny Horton, (United States) Mike Green	(United States) Tina Rhoton	(United States) Cindy Head, (United States) Gina Harris
1985	Tornado	Oklahoma City, United States	(United States) Kevin Keeter		(United States) John Smith, (United States) Daniel Smith	(United States) Christina Fern	(United States) Kerri Johnston, (United States) Gina Harris
1986	Dynamo	Dallas, United States	(United States) Tony Bacon	King Pin	(United States) Chad Hanson, (United States) Steve Cobian		(United States) Cindy Head, (United States) Gina Harris
1986	Tornado	Dallas, United States	(United States) Todd Loffredo	Pull Shot	(United States) Todd Loffredo, (United States) Johnny Horton	(United States) Cindy Head	
1987	Dynamo	Dallas, United States	(United States) Tony Bacon	King Pin	(United States) Todd Loffredo, (United States) Bob Maloney	(United States) Cindy Head	(United States) Cindy Head, (United States) Kathy Swift
1987	Tornado	Dallas, United States	(United States) Steve Murray	Mixed	(United States) Todd Loffredo, (United States) Steve Murray	(United States) Cindy Head	(United States) Cindy Head, (United States) Kathy Swift
1988	Tornado	Dallas, United States	(United States) Gregg Perrie	Classic Pin	(United States) Randy Stark, (United States) Karl Miller	(United States) Cindy Head	(United States) Cindy Head, (United States) Gina Smith
1989	Tornado	Dallas, United States	(United States) Steve Murray	Mixed	(United States) Tom Spear, (United States) Gus Trevino	(United States) Cindy Head	(United States) Cindy Head, (United States) Gina Smith
1990	Tornado	Dallas, United States	(United States) Johnny Horton	Pull Shot	(United States) Todd Loffredo, (United States) Gus Trevino	(United States) Cindy Head	(United States) Cindy Head, (United States) Liz Trotter
1991	Tornado	Dallas, United States	(United States) John Smith	Pull Shot	(United States) John Smith, (United States) Kevin Keeter	(United States) Cindy Head	(United States) Cindy Head, (United States) Liz Trotter
1992	Tornado	Dallas, United States	(United States) Terry Moore	Snake Shot	(United States) Todd Loffredo, (United States) Gus Trevino	(United States) Cindy Head	(United States) Tiffany Moore (Billirakis), (United States) Lotus Chesbrough (Leong)
1993	Tornado	Dallas, United States	(United States) Tommy Adkisson	Mixed	(United States) Tommy Adkisson, (United States) Russ King	(United States) Cindy Head	(United States) Cindy Head, (United States) Jimmie Watkins
1994	Tornado	Dallas, United States	(United States) Tom Spear	Mixed	(United States) Todd Loffredo, (United States) Scott Wydman	(United States) Cindy Head	(United States) Cindy Head, (United States) Jimmie Watkins
1995	Tornado	Dallas, United States	(United States) Dave Gummeson	Pull Shot	(United States) Todd Loffredo, (United States) Scott Wydman	(United States) Cami Carter	(United States) Tiffany Moore, (United States) Angela Sine
1996	Tornado	Dallas, United States	(United States) Louis Cartwright	Snake Shot	(United States) Robert Mares, (United States) Tommy Adkisson	(United States) Tiffany Moore	(United States) Tiffany Moore, (United States) Angela Sine
1997	Tornado	Dallas, United States	(United States) Tommy Adkisson	Mixed	(United States) Bobby Diaz, (United States) Terry Moore	(United States) Cindy Head	(Canada) Moya Tielens, (United States) Laurette Gunther
1998	Tornado	Fort Worth, United States	(United States) Terry Moore	Snake Shot	(United States) Todd Loffredo, (Belgium) Frédéric Collignon	(United States) Maggie Dix	(United States) Kathy Richey, (United States) Melanee Tosh
1999	Tornado	Dallas, United States	(Belgium) Frédéric Collignon	Euro Pin	(United States) Todd Loffredo, (Belgium) Frédéric Collignon	(United States) Cindy Head	(United States) Cindy Head, (United States) Tina Wyatt
2000	Tornado	Dallas, United States	(Belgium) Frédéric Collignon	Euro Pin	(United States) Todd Loffredo, (Belgium) Frédéric Collignon	(United States) Cindy Head	(United States) Cindy Head, (United States) Tina Wyatt
2001	Tornado	Dallas, United States	(United States) Johnny Horton	Pull Shot	(United States) Todd Loffredo, (Belgium) Frédéric Collignon	(United States) Cindy Head	(United States) Becky Cherry, (United States) Amy Fletcher
2002	Tornado	Dallas, United States	(Belgium) Frédéric Collignon	Euro Pin	(United States) Todd Loffredo, (Belgium) Frédéric Collignon	(Canada) Moya Tielens	(Canada) Moya Tielens, (United States) Laurette Gunther
2003	Tornado	Dallas, United States	(United States) Tony Spredeman	Snake Shot	(United States) Eddie Gartman, (United States) Adrian Zamora	(United States) Cindy Head	(Canada) Moya Tielens, (United States) Joy Steward
2004	Tornado	Dallas, United States	(Belgium) Frédéric Collignon	Euro Pin	(United States) Todd Loffredo, (Belgium) Frédéric Collignon	(United States) Cindy Head	(Canada) Moya Tielens, (United States) Joy Steward
2005	Tornado	Dallas, United States	(Belgium) Frédéric Collignon	Mixed	(United States) Louis Cartwright, (United States) Tom Yore	(United States) Stayce Fowler	(Canada) Moya Tielens, (United States) Joy Steward
2006	Tornado	Las Vegas, United States	(United States) Billy Pappas	Mixed	(United States) Dave Gummeson, (United States) Tracy McMillin	(United States) Cindy Head	(United States) Tiffany Moore, (United States) Lotus Chesbrough
2007	Tornado	Las Vegas, United States	(Belgium) Frédéric Collignon	Euro Pin	(United States) Todd Loffredo, (Belgium) Frédéric Collignon	(Canada) Moya Tielens	(Canada) Moya Tielens, (United States) Gena Murray
2008	Tornado	Las Vegas, United States	(United States) Tony Spredeman	Snake Shot	(United States) Dave Gummeson, (United States) Tracy McMillin	(United States) Cindy Head	(United States) Cindy Head, (United States) Dawn Duquette
2009	Tornado	Dallas, United States	(United States) Billy Pappas	Mixed	(United States) Todd Loffredo, (Belgium) Frédéric Collignon	(United States) Liz Hill Moore	(United States) Jan Maynard, (United States) Joy Steward
2010	Tornado	Dallas, United States	(United States) Ryan Moore	Mixed	(United States) Todd Loffredo, (Belgium) Frédéric Collignon	(Germany) Sandra Ranff	(United States) Jan Maynard, (United States) Joy Steward
2011	Tornado	Dallas, United States	(United States) Billy Pappas	Mixed	(United States) Todd Loffredo, (Belgium) Frédéric Collignon	(United States) Traci Brubaker	(United States) Jan Maynard, (United States) Joy Steward
2012	Tornado	Dallas, United States	(Belgium) Frédéric Collignon	Euro Pin	(United States) Todd Loffredo, (Belgium) Frédéric Collignon	(United States) Cindy Head	(United States) Liz Hill Moore, (United States) Christina Fuchs
2013	Tornado	Dallas, United States	(United States) Tony Spredeman	Snake Shot	(United States) Tony Spredeman, (United States) Robert Mares	(Canada) Linda Ly	(United States) Liz Hill Moore, (United States) Christina Fuchs
2014	Tornado	Dallas, United States	(United States) Ryan Moore	Mixed	(United States) Bobby Diaz, (United States) Ryan Moore	(United States) Cindy Head	(United States) Cindy Head, (United States) Gena Murray
2015	Tornado	Lexington, United States	(United States) Tony Spredeman	Snake Shot	(United States) Terry Rue, (United States) Robert Mares	(United States) Cindy Head	(Canada) Linda Ly, (United States) Keisha Rue
2016	Tornado	Lexington, United States	(United States) Tony Spredeman	Snake Shot	(United States) Tony Spredeman, (United States) Robert Mares	(Canada) Linda Ly	(United States) Stayce Fowler, (United States) Shelly Langley
2017	Tornado	Lexington, United States	(United States) Tony Spredeman	Walking Snake Shot	(United States) Bobby Diaz, (United States) Ryan Moore	(United States) Jessica Sanftleben	(United States) Sullivan Rue, (United States) Deliza Baumbach
2018	Tornado	Lexington, United States	(United States) Tony Spredeman	Snake Shot	(United States) Bobby Diaz, (United States) Ryan Moore	(United States) Midori Kimura	(United States) Jessica Sanftleben, (United States) Midori Kimura
2019	Tornado	Lexington, United States	(United States) Tony Spredeman	Snake Shot	(United States) Tommy Yore, (United States) Brandon Moreland	(United States) Midori Kimura	(United States) Jessica Sanftleben, (United States) Midori Kimura
2020	No event created						
2021	Tornado	Lexington, United States	(United States) Ryan Moore	(Walking) Snake Shot	(United States) Blake Robertson, (United States) Ryan Moore	(United States) Sullivan Rue	(United States) Sullivan Rue, (United States) Hannah Smith
2022	Tornado	Lexington, United States	(Costa Rica) Brandon Muñoz	(Walking) Snake Shot	(Costa Rica) Brandon Muñoz, (Costa Rica) Kevin Romero	(United States) Midori Kimura	(United States) Sullivan Rue, (United States) Hannah Smith
2023	Tornado	Lexington, United States	(United States) Tony Spredeman	(Walking) Snake Shot	(Costa Rica) Brandon Muñoz, (Costa Rica) Kevin Romero	(United States) Sullivan Rue	(United States) Sullivan Rue, (United States) Hannah Smith
2024	Tornado	Lexington, United States	(United States) Trevor Park	Snake Shot	(United States) Tommy Yore, (United States) Ryan Moore	(United States) Hannah Smith	(United States) Jessica Sanftleben, (United States) Maggie Strong
2025	WFT World Championships of Foosball	New Orleans, United States	(United States) Tommy Yore	(Walking) Snake Shot	(Canada) Mario Ariganello, (United States) Kane Gabriel	(United States) Sullivan Rue	(United States) Sullivan Rue, (United States) Isabelle Stelly
2026	WFT World Championships of Foosball	New Orleans, United States	(United States) Tony Spredeman	(Walking) Snake Shot	(United States) Erik Hueltner, (United States) Jacob Balcos	(United States) Isaballe Stelly	(United States) Hannah Bufkin, (Canada) Linda Ly

== ITSF WCS (World Championship Series) Champions ==
Year	Format	Location	Open Singles		Open Doubles	Nations		Women Singles	Women Doubles
Year	Format	Location	Winner	Shooting Style	Winner	Men	Women	Winner	
2004	Roberto Sport	Castellamonte, Italy	(Belgium) Frédéric Collignon	Euro Pin	Event not created	Event not created (held for the first time in 2010)		Event not created	Event not created
2004	Bonzini	Paris, France	(Belgium) Frédéric Collignon	Euro Pin	(Belgium) Arturo Carletta, (Belgium) Frédéric Collignon	Event not created (held for the first time in 2010)		(France) Estelle Jacquot	(France) Estelle Jacquot, (France) Audrey Mourgues
2004	Eurosoccer	Borgloon, Belgium	(Belgium) Frédéric Collignon	Euro Pin	Event not created	Event not created (held for the first time in 2010)		Event not created	Event not created
2004	Tornado	Dallas, United States	(Belgium) Frédéric Collignon	Euro Pin	(United States) Todd Loffredo, (Belgium) Frédéric Collignon	Event not created (held for the first time in 2010)		Event not created	Event not created
2005	Bonzini	Paris, France	(Belgium) Frédéric Collignon	Euro Pin	(Belgium) Tom van de Cauter, (Belgium) Kurt van de Cauter	Event not created (held for the first time in 2010)		(France) Estelle Jacquot	(Belgium) Kathy Delagrense, (Belgium) Ines Kouijzer
2005	Roberto Sport	Lugano, Italy	(Belgium) Frédéric Collignon	Euro Pin	(Belgium) Ismaël Saban, (Belgium) Frédéric Collignon	Event not created (held for the first time in 2010)		(Switzerland) Samantha Di Paolo	Event not created
2005	Garlando	Vienna, Austria	(Belgium) Frédéric Collignon	Euro Pin	(Germany) Jamal Allalou, (Belgium) Frédéric Collignon	Event not created (held for the first time in 2010)		(Austria) Verena Rohrer	(Austria) Verena Rohrer, (Austria) Melissa Mosser
2005	Tornado	Dallas, United States	(United States) Billy Pappas	Mixed	(United States) Tom Yore, (United States) Louis Cartwright	Event not created (held for the first time in 2010)		(United States) Stayce Fowler	(Canada) Moya Tielens, (United States) Joy Steward
2006	Bonzini	Paris, France	(France) François Cheuret	Mixed	(Belgium) Arturo Carletta, (Belgium) Frédéric Collignon	Event not created (held for the first time in 2010)		(France) Estelle Jacquot	(Switzerland) Samantha Di Paolo, (Germany) Sonja Breuer
2006	Garlando	Tulln, Austria	(Belgium) Frédéric Collignon	Euro Pin	(Germany) Jamal Allalou, (Belgium) Frédéric Collignon	Event not created (held for the first time in 2010)		(Austria) Verena Rohrer	(Austria) Verena Rohrer, (Austria) Melissa Mosser
2006	Tornado	Las Vegas, United States	(United States) Billy Pappas	Mixed	(United States) Dave Gummeson, (United States) Tracy McMillin	Event not created (held for the first time in 2010)		(United States) Cindy Head	(United States) Tiffany Moore, (United States) Lotus Chesbrough
2007	Bonzini	Paris, France	(Belgium) Frédéric Collignon	Euro Pin	(Belgium) Arturo Carletta, (Belgium) Frédéric Collignon	Event not created (held for the first time in 2010)		(France) Anais Noel	(France) Marine Pohl, (France) Laurene Demonteclain
2007	Tecball	Borgloon, Belgium	(Belgium) Frédéric Collignon	Euro Pin	(Belgium) Tom van de Cauter, (United Kingdom) Rob Atha	Event not created (held for the first time in 2010)		(Switzerland) Samantha Di Paolo	(Switzerland) Samantha Di Paolo, (Belgium) Ingrid Hauben
2007	Roberto Sport	Giubiasco, Switzerland	(Belgium) Frédéric Collignon	Euro Pin	(United States) Billy Pappas, (Belgium) Frédéric Collignon	Event not created (held for the first time in 2010)		(Switzerland) Samantha Di Paolo	(Switzerland) Samantha Di Paolo, (Switzerland) Franziska Oberhauser
2007	Garlando	Tulln, Austria	(Belgium) Frédéric Collignon	Euro Pin	(United States) Todd Loffredo, (Belgium) Frédéric Collignon	Event not created (held for the first time in 2010)		(Austria) Verena Rohrer	(Switzerland) Samantha Di Paolo, (Switzerland) Franziska Oberhauser
2007	Tornado	Las Vegas, United States	(Belgium) Frédéric Collignon	Euro Pin	(United States) Todd Loffredo, (Belgium) Frédéric Collignon	Event not created (held for the first time in 2010)		(Canada) Moya Tielens	(Canada) Moya Tielens, (United States) Gena Murray
2008	Bonzini	Eaubonne, France	(Belgium) Frédéric Collignon	Euro Pin	(Belgium) Arturo Carletta, (Belgium) Frédéric Collignon	Event not created (held for the first time in 2010)		(France) Estelle Jacquot	(France) Estelle Jacquot, (France) Alice Denmanivong
2008	Tecball	Aschaffenburg, Germany	(Belgium) Frédéric Collignon	Euro Pin	(United States) Todd Loffredo, (Belgium) Frédéric Collignon	Event not created (held for the first time in 2010)		(Switzerland) Samantha Di Paolo	(Germany) Sabine Brose, (Germany) Asimenia Kiroglou
2008	Garlando	Tulln, Austria	(Belgium) Frédéric Collignon	Euro Pin	(United States) Todd Loffredo, (Belgium) Frédéric Collignon	Event not created (held for the first time in 2010)		(Austria) Verena Rohrer	(Austria) Verena Rohrer, (Austria) Melissa Mosser
2008	Roberto Sport	Giubiasco, Switzerland	(Switzerland) Gilles Perrin	Euro Pin	(Belgium) Davy Dehoest, (Germany) Jamal Allalou	Event not created (held for the first time in 2010)		(Germany) Sandra Ranff	(Switzerland) Samantha Di Paolo, (Switzerland) Franziska Oberhauser
2008	Tornado	Las Vegas, United States	(United States) Tony Spredeman	Snake Shot	(United States) Dave Gummeson, (United States) Tracy McMillin	Event not created (held for the first time in 2010)		(United States) Cindy Head	(United States) Cindy Head, (United States) Dawn Duquette
2009	Tecball	Valkenswaard, Netherlands	(Belgium) Frédéric Collignon	Euro Pin	(Germany) Jamal Allalou, (Belgium) Frédéric Collignon	Event not created (held for the first time in 2010)		(Germany) Katrin Matsushita	(Germany) Sandra Ranff, (Germany) Lilly Andres
2009	Bonzini	Eaubonne, France	(Belgium) Frédéric Collignon	Euro Pin	(United Kingdom) Rob Atha, (Belgium) Frédéric Collignon	Event not created (held for the first time in 2010)		(France) Estelle Jacquot	(France) Estelle Jacquot, (France) Alice Denmanivong
2009	Garlando	Tulln, Austria	(United States) Billy Pappas	Mixed	(Austria) Wolfgang Reszler, (Slovakia) Pavol Kováčik	Event not created (held for the first time in 2010)		(Austria) Verena Rohrer	(Austria) Verena Rohrer, (Austria) Melissa Mosser
2009	Tornado	Dallas, United States	(United States) Billy Pappas	Mixed	(United States) Todd Loffredo, (Belgium) Frédéric Collignon	Event not created (held for the first time in 2010)		(United States) Liz Hill Moore	(United States) Jan Maynard, (United States) Joy Steward
2009	Roberto Sport	Prague, Czech Republic	(Belgium) Frédéric Collignon	Euro Pin	(United States) Billy Pappas, (Belgium) Frédéric Collignon	Germany		(Germany) Sabine Brose	(Germany) Sandra Ranff, (Germany) Simone Burkhardt
2010	Tecball	Koblenz, Germany	(Belgium) Frédéric Collignon	Euro Pin	(Germany) Jamal Allalou, (Belgium) Frédéric Collignon	Germany	Germany	(Germany) Sandra Ranff	(Switzerland) Noemi Berkeczy, (Switzerland) Beatrix Ammann
2010	Bonzini	Paris, France	(Belgium) Frédéric Collignon	Euro Pin	(United States) Billy Pappas, (Belgium) Frédéric Collignon	Belgium	France	(France) Estelle Jacquot	(France) Estelle Jacquot, (France) Alice Denmanivong
2010	Garlando	Hartberg, Austria	(United Kingdom) Rob Atha	Mixed	(United Kingdom) Rob Atha, (Belgium) Frédéric Collignon	Germany	Austria	(Austria) Verena Rohrer	(Austria) Verena Rohrer, (Austria) Melissa Mosser
2010	Roberto Sport	Prague, Czech Republic	(Belgium) Frédéric Collignon	Euro Pin	(United Kingdom) Rob Atha, (Belgium) Frédéric Collignon	Germany	Germany	(Germany) Sandra Ranff	(Hungary) Noémi Takács, (Hungary) Eva Albok
2011	Bonzini	Eaubonne, France	(France) Sébastien Meckes	Euro Pin	(Netherlands) Henk Habets, (Netherlands) Rocco Raven	France	France	(Denmark) Amalie Bremer	(Denmark) Amalie Bremer, (Denmark) Camilla Lohmann
2011	Garlando	Oberwart, Austria	(Belgium) Frédéric Collignon	Euro Pin	(Austria) Anton Skok, (Austria) Kevin Hundstorfer	Germany	Poland	(Austria) Verena Rohrer	(Germany) Sandra Ranff, (Germany) Asimenia Kiroglou
2011	Leonhart	Hochsauerland, Germany	(Belgium) Frédéric Collignon	Euro Pin	(Germany) Jamal Allalou, (Belgium) Frédéric Collignon	Belgium	(Germany) German	(Denmark) Amalie Bremer	(Belgium) Ellen van Onckelen, (Netherlands) Tessa Otten-Kerkhof
2012	Roberto Sport	Chorzów, Poland	(United States) Ryan Moore	Mixed	(United States) Ryan Moore, (Netherlands) Henk Habets	Hungary	Czech Republic	(Bulgaria) Ekaterina Atanasova	(Poland) Agata Cwiakala, (Poland) Agnieszka Rutowska
2012	Bonzini	Pontoise, France	(Portugal) Paul Nunes	Snake Shot	(France) Farid Ouahnache, (France) Karim El Hamdioui	Denmark	Denmark	(Denmark) Amalie Bremer	(France) Anais Noel, (France) Marine Pohl
2012	Garlando	Salzburg, Austria	(Austria) Kevin Hundstorfer	Snake Shot	(Belgium) Frédéric Collignon, (United Kingdom) , Rob Atha	Austria	Austria	(Austria) Verena Rohrer	(Austria) Verena Rohrer, (Austria) Melissa Mosser
2012	Leonhart	Medebach, Germany	(Germany) Longlong Krutwig	Snake Shot	(Belgium) Tom van de Cauter, (Austria) Andreas Esterbauer	Germany	Germany	(Germany) Katrin Matsushita	(Germany) Katrin Matsushita, (Germany) Asimenia Kiroglou
2012	Fireball	Taoyuan, Taiwan	(United States) Tom Yore	Pull Shot	(Malaysia) Melvin Yap, (Malaysia) Zayd Mohd Nor	Kuwait	Event not held	(Malaysia) Natalie Teh	(Malaysia) Natalie Teh, (Malaysia) Loy Ee Lin
2013	Bonzini	Pontoise, France	(France) Miguel Dos Santos Lote	Euro Pin	(Denmark) Niels Wonsyld, (Denmark) Sven Wonsyld	France	Denmark	(Denmark) Amalie Bremer	(Denmark) Amalie Bremer, (Denmark) Camilla Lohmann
2013	Garlando	Salzburg, Austria	(United States) Billy Pappas	Mixed	(Hungary) Géza Kiss, (Hungary) Tamás Csige	Austria	Poland	(Austria) Verena Rohrer	(Hungary) Noémi Takács, (Hungary) Petra Szendei
2013	Leonhart	Medebach, Germany	(Belgium) Frédéric Collignon	Euro Pin	(United States) Billy Pappas, (Belgium) Frédéric Collignon	Hungary	Germany	(Denmark) Amalie Bremer	(Germany) Sandra Ranff, (Belgium) Ingrid Hauben
2013	Fireball	Kuala Lumpur, Malaysia	(United States) Tony Spredeman	Snake Shot	(Republic of Ireland) Damian Glavin, (United States) Tony Spredeman	Iran	Event not held	(Malaysia) Natalie Teh	(Malaysia) Melanie Loh, (Hungary) Petra Koncz
2014	Bonzini	Pontoise, France	(France) Miguel Dos Santos Lote	Euro Pin	(Belgium) Frédéric Collignon, (United Kingdom) Rob Atha	Denmark	France	(France) Marine Pohl	(Denmark) Amalie Bremer, (Denmark) Camilla Lohmann
2014	Garlando	Salzburg, Austria	(Austria) Kevin Hundstorfer	Snake Shot	(Austria) Bernhard Kraus, (Austria) Florian Brückner	Austria	Austria	(Austria) Verena Rohrer	(Austria) Verena Rohrer, (Austria) Melissa Mosser
2014	Leonhart	Luxembourg	(Belgium) Frédéric Collignon	Euro Pin	(Luxembourg) Leonardo Stamerra, (Luxembourg) Christophe Dias	Luxembourg	Germany	(Belgium) Lynn Keppens	(Germany) Bianca Wegener, (Germany) Pia-susanne Merbach
2014	Roberto Sport	Lignano Sabbiadoro, Italy	(Poland) Mateusz Fudala	Snake Shot	(Luxembourg) Yannick Correia, (Belgium) Arturo Carletta	Austria	Austria	(Denmark) Amalie Bremer	(Hungary) Noémi Takács, (Hungary) Nikolett Nagy
2015	Bonzini	Beauvais, France	(Belgium) Frédéric Collignon	Euro Pin	(Luxembourg) Yannick Correia, (Belgium) Arturo Carletta	Denmark	France	(France) Estelle Jacquot	(France) Anais Noel, (France) Marine Pohl
2015	Garlando	Vienna, Austria	(Austria) Benjamin Willfort	Snake Shot	(Austria) Vladimír Drábik, (Austria) Kevin Hundstorfer	Event not held		(Bulgaria) Ekaterina Atanasova	(Hungary) Noémi Takács, (Switzerland) Cindy Kubiatowicz
2015	Leonhart	Berlin, Germany	(Germany) Yannik Hansen	Snake Shot	(Belgium) Frédéric Collignon, (United Kingdom) Rob Atha	Germany	Austria	(Denmark) Amalie Bremer	(Austria) Verena Rohrer, (Austria) Melissa Mosser
2016	Bonzini	Saint-Quentin, France	(Portugal) Joaquim Pinheiro	Pin	(United States) Billy Pappas, (Belgium) Frédéric Collignon	Event not held		(France) Estelle Jacquot	(France) Estelle Jacquot, (France) Malika Senouci
2016	Garlando	Salzburg, Austria	(Austria) Kevin Hundstorfer	Snake Shot	(Germany) Ingo Aufderheide, (Germany) Ruben Heinrich	Austria	Switzerland	(Switzerland) Cindy Kubiatowicz	(Hungary) Noémi Takács, (Switzerland) Cindy Kubiatowicz
2016	Leonhart	Sankt Wendel, Germany	(Germany) Felix Droese	Snake Shot	(Luxembourg) Yannick Correia, (Belgium) Tom van de Cauter	Event not held		(Bulgaria) Ekaterina Atanasova	(Denmark) Amalie Bremer, (Denmark) Nathalie Saltz
2017	Bonzini	St Quentin, France	(France) Olivier Covos	Euro Pin	(Luxembourg) Yannick Correia, (Belgium) Frédéric Collignon	Luxembourg	Denmark	(France) Estelle Jacquot	(Denmark) Amalie Bremer, (Denmark) Amalie Wolff
2017	Garlando	Sankt Pölten, Austria	(Austria) Kevin Hundstorfer	Snake Shot	(Austria) Vladimír Drábik, (Austria) Kevin Hundstorfer	Switzerland	Austria	(Austria) Marina Tabakovic	(Austria) Marina Tabakovic, (Austria) Karen Scheuer
2017	Leonhart	Sankt Wendel, Germany	(Germany) Yannik Hansen	Snake Shot	(Luxembourg) Yannick Correia, (Belgium) Frédéric Collignon	Event not held		(Bulgaria) Ekaterina Atanasova	(Bulgaria) Ekaterina Atanasova, (Bulgaria) Blagovesta Gerova
2018	Bonzini	Rouen, France	(France) Miguel Dos Santos Lote	Euro Pin	(Luxembourg) Fabio Ferreira, (Luxembourg) Bruno Goncalves	France	France	(Denmark) Amalie Bremer	(Denmark) Amalie Bremer, (Belgium) Nele Missotten
2018	Garlando	Sankt Pölten, Austria	(Austria) Kevin Hundstorfer	Snake Shot	(United Kingdom) Rob Atha, (Belgium) Frédéric Collignon	Switzerland	Austria	(Austria) Sophie Jobstmann	(Austria) Verena Rohrer, (Austria) Sabrina Astleitner
2018	Leonhart	Sankt Wendel, Germany	(Luxembourg) Yannick Correia	Snake Shot	(Netherlands) Raoul Chamuleau, (Netherlands) Thijs van Schijndel	Czech Republic	Germany	(Luxembourg) Cindy Ferreira Da Fonte	(Luxembourg) Cindy Ferreira Da Fonte, (Germany) Stefanie Schmid
2018	Roberto Sport	Naples, Italy	(Czech Republic) Ladislav Křepela	Pull Shot	(Italy) Angelo Ciurlino, (Italy) Lorenzo Nesta	Italy	Italy	(Italy) Roberta Begnis	(Germany) Susanne Holocher, (Germany) Sabine Brose
2019	Garlando	Sankt Pölten, Austria	(Switzerland) Marcel Glaus	Snake Shot	(Austria) Vladimír Drábik, (Austria) Kevin Hundstorfer	Switzerland	Austria	(Austria) Sophie Jobstmann	(Austria) Verena Rohrer, (Austria) Sabrina Astleitner
2019	Bonzini	Mondeville, Calvados, France	(Luxembourg) Yannick Correia	Mixed	(France) Adam Tourmente, (France) Sébastien Meckes	Event not held		(Denmark) Amalie Bremer	(Denmark) Amalie Bremer, (Denmark) Lea Kvistgaard
2019	Leonhart	Sankt Wendel, Germany	(United States) Tony Spredeman	Snake Shot	(France) Miguel Dos Santos Lote, (France) Hervé Dos Santos Lote	Germany	Germany	(Bulgaria) Blagovesta Gerova	(Germany) Linh Tran, (Romania) Ecaterina Sarbulescu
2020	No events held								
2021	Leonhart	Sankt Wendel, Germany	(Germany) Thomas Haas	Snake Shot	(Germany) Felix Droese, (Germany) Yannik Hansen	Germany	Germany	(Germany) Linh Tran	(Germany) Linh Tran, (Romania) Ecaterina Sarbulescu
2022	Bonzini	Évry, France	(Denmark) Sven Wonsyld	Pin shot	(France) Pascal Denivet, (France) Nicolas Denivet	Event not held		(France) Estelle Jacquot	(Germany) Maura Porrmann, (Germany) Michaela Klass
2022	Garlando	Sankt Pölten, Austria	(Austria) Kevin Hundstorfer	Snake Shot	(Austria) Benjamin Willfort, (Austria) Daniel Burmetler	Switzerland	Bulgaria	(Romania) Ecaterina Sarbulescu	(Austria) Verena Rohrer, (Austria) Sabrina Rohrer (Astleitner)
2022	Leonhart	Sankt Wendel, Germany	(Germany) Alexander Di Bello	Snake Shot	(Germany) Finn Meyer, (Germany) Semin Mensah	Germany	Germany	(Germany) Linh Tran	(Germany) Linh Tran, (Romania) Ecaterina Sarbulescu
2023	Bonzini	Saint-Avertin, France	(France) Miguel Dos Santos Lote	Euro Pin	(France) Adam Tourmente, (Belgium) Tom Van De Cauter	Event not held		(France) Estelle Jaquot	(Germany) Linh Tran, (Romania) Ecaterina Sarbulescu
2023	Garlando	Sankt Pölten, Austria	(Austria) Stefan Burmetler		(Austria) Benjamin Willfort, (Austria) Daniel Burmetler	Switzerland	Austria	(Germany) Linh Tran	(Germany) Linh Tran, (Romania) Ecaterina Sarbulescu
2023	Leonhart	Sankt Wendel, Germany	(United States) Tony Spredeman	Snake Shot	(Germany) Felix Droese, (Germany) Yannik Hansen	Netherlands	Germany	(Germany) Linh Tran	(Germany) Linh Tran, (Romania) Ecaterina Sarbulescu
2024	Bonzini	Évry, France	(France) Yoann Sicot		(Germany) Thomas Haas, (Germany) Luis Janssen	France	Germany	(Portugal) Ângela Costa	(France) Anais Noel, (France) Marine Pohl
2024	Tornado	Dallas, United States	(United States) Tommy Yore		(United States) Ryan Moore, (United States) Kane Gabriel	United States	Event not held	(United States) Sullivan Rue	(Germany) Linh Tran, (Romania) Ecaterina Sarbulescu
2024	Leonhart	Saarbrücken, Germany	(United States) Tony Spredeman		(United States) Tony Spredeman, (Germany) Björn Hoffmann	France	Germany	(Bulgaria) Veronika Mincheva	(Germany) Djamila Nader, (Germany) Sarah Klabunde
2024	Garlando	Sankt Pölten, Austria	(Austria) Stefan Burmetler		(United States) Tony Spredeman, (Germany) Björn Hoffmann			(Austria) Verena Rohrer	(Austria) Marina Tabakovic, (Austria) Karen Scheuer
2025	Bonzini	Orléans, France	(France) Miguel Dos Santos Lote	Euro Pin	(Portugal) Yannick Correia, (Belgium) Tom van der Cauter	France	France	(Romania) Ecaterina Sarbulescu	(Germany) Linh Tran, (Romania) Ecaterina Sarbulescu
2025	Tornado	Dallas, United States	(United States) Ryan Moore	Pull Shot	(United States) Tommy Yore, (Costa Rica) Brandon Muñoz	United States	Germany	(Romania) Ecaterina Sarbulescu	(United States) Maryam Aly, (United States) Stayce Fowler
2025	Leonhart	Saarbrücken, Germany	(Germany) Nico Wohlgemuth	Snake Shot	(Germany) Nico Wohlgemuth, (Germany) Dominik Pfingst	Germany	Germany	(Germany) Linh Tran	(Germany) Linh Tran, (Romania) Ecaterina Sarbulescu
