= My Linh Tran =

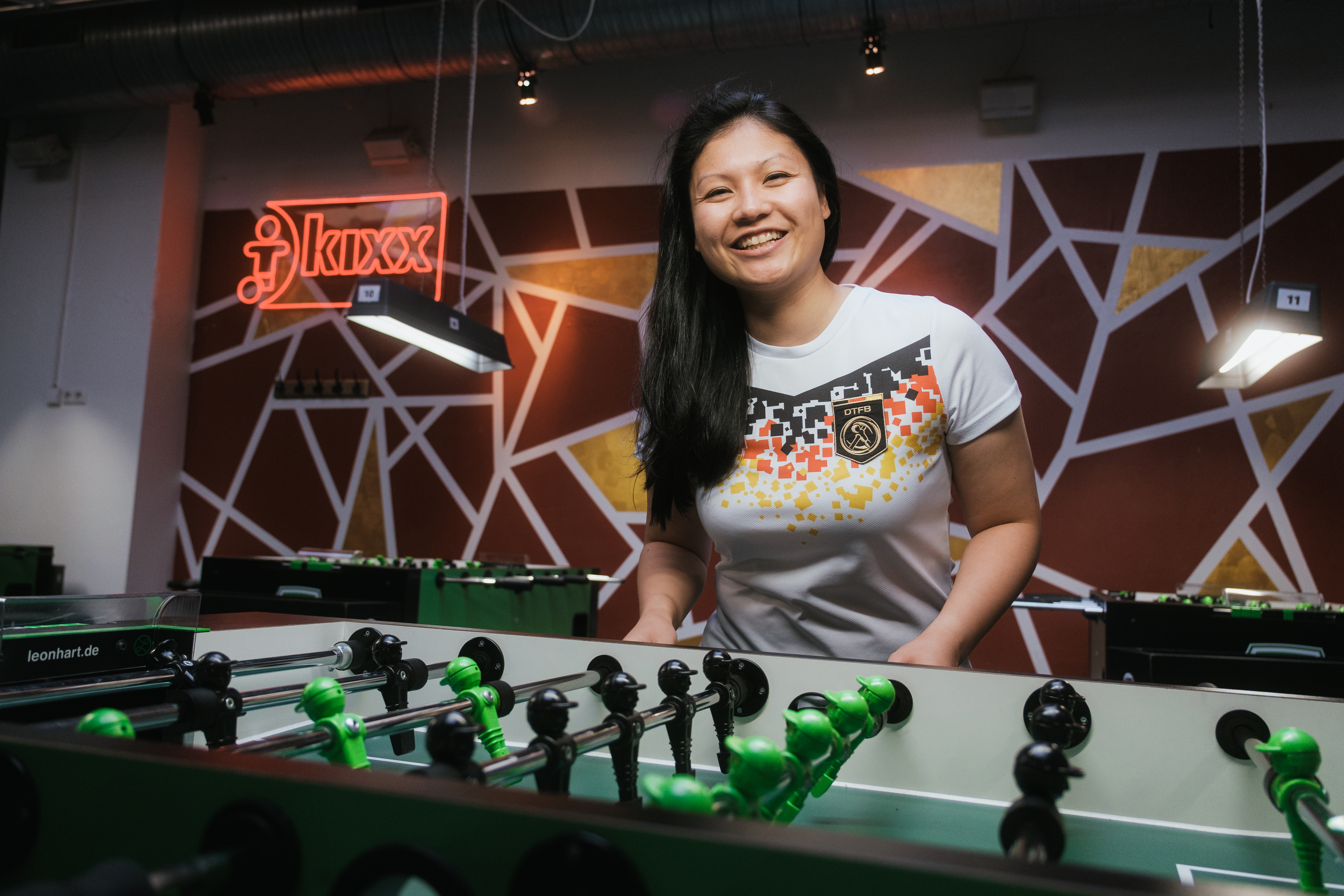
My Linh Tran

My Linh Tran is a German table football player. They have been crowned women's single/double world table football champion a combined seven times in different world championships.
