= Tommy Adkisson =

American table football player

Tommy "Two-Gun" Adkisson is an American professional Foosball player. He is a multiple world champion. In particular, Adkisson "won 8 major titles during the 1990s", and placed well in several tournaments in the 2007 season.

== See also ==
- List of world table football champions
