= Garlando =

Garlando S.r.l
- Type: Private
- Industry: Table sports manufacturing
- Founded: 1954
- Headquarters: Novi Ligure, Italy
- Key people: Giuseppe Garlando, Managing Director
- Products: Table football and pocket billiards tables
- Website: Garlando.it

Garlando is a company based in Italy that produces pocket billiards (pool), table football (foosball) and ping pong tables.

== History ==
Garlando was founded officially in 1954 at Spinetta Marengo – a small village near Alessandria – by Renato Garlando, the father of the present managing director, already in the market for the production of various wood objects. An activity that he, in his turn, had inherited from his father.

Following the success of table football, originating in the United Kingdom in the early 1920s, and later the United States, Spain and France, Renato Garlando decided to produce them for the Italian market, where he had unexpected success.

From then on, the company continuously grew. Foreign countries were added to the domestic revenue, including overseas to the United States, where the Garlando football tables experienced a boom in the 1970s.

During this time, Garlando began manufacturing pool tables with the same domestic success as with table football equipment.

In the course of the 1980s, the current managing director, Giuseppe Garlando, took the lead and, with his brother Marino, began renovating the working procedures which, from still largely craftsmanlike, became industrialised and standardised.

In the 1990s, the North Africa and Eastern Europe markets were tapped, and the product range was expanded to meet the requirements of new segments of public.

To meet more and more urgent production requirements, late in 2002 the company left Spinetta Marengo to move to their much more modern premises at Pozzolo Formigaro, near Novi Ligure, a dozen kilometres from the old site.

The company now covers a 10,000 square metre area, equipped with the most modern machines to work the wood as well as to mould the plastic. The new location employs over 60 people, both for the office and the factory.

== See also ==
- List of sporting goods manufacturers
