= International Table Soccer Federation =

Non-profit organization based in France

- Founded: 16 August 2002; 24 years ago
- Type: List of international sports federations
- Legal status: Sports governing body of Table Football
- Location: Nantes, France
- President: (France) Farid Lounas
- Website: www.tablesoccer.org

The International Table Soccer Federation (ITSF) is a non-profit organization based in France that promotes table soccer. It endorses soccer tables that meet requirements for international competition.

The five official tables are currently furnished by Bonzini, Garlando, Roberto Sport, Tornado, and Leonhart, with the ITSF recognising a number of other tables (Warrior Table Soccer, Fireball, Rosengart, Jupiter, Metegol) - as being suitable for national competition.

== Membership ==
There are two membership categories that ITSF operates - Regular and Associate. The categories differ in the list of required standards, like membership fees, up-to-date registers of national clubs and venues, the number of ITSF-sanctioned tournaments, the general understanding of table football as a sport etc.

While Regular Members are mature federations, Associate Members should be able to demonstrate the potential to develop table football to the level of a Regular Member.

== Nations Members Regions ==
ITSF was founded in 2002. Events have been held since 2004.

61 Nations in 1 July 2023:

1. Asia-Oceania (12): Afghanistan/China/India/Iran/Japan/Kuwait/Laos/Nepal/Saudi Arabia/South Korea/United Arab Emirates/Vietnam
2. Africa (11): Algeria/Cameroon/Congo (Kinshasa)/Ghana/Ivory Coast/Mali/Nigeria/Somalia/Togo/Tunisia/Zimbabwe
3. Europe (27): Armenia/Austria/Belgium/Bulgaria/Croatia/Czech Republic/Denmark/Finland/France/Germany/Hungary/Israel/Italy/Lithuania/Luxembourg/Malta/Netherlands/Poland/Portugal/Russia/Romania/Serbia/Slovakia/Spain/ Switzerland/Turkey/United Kingdom
4. North America (2): Canada/United States
5. Latin America (9): Argentina/Bolivia/Brazil/Chile/Colombia/Costa Rica/Guatemala/Mexico/Peru

== Current Regular Members ==
Country	National Federation	Established	ITSF-affiliated
Chinese Taipei	Chinese Taipei Foosball Association	01.11.2006	01.08.2007
Iran	Islamic Republic Iran Association	12.04.2019	12.04.2019
Japan	Japan Table Soccer Federation	01.01.1999	01.08.2007
Kuwait	Kuwait Table Soccer Association	01.01.2010	01.01.2010
Armenia	Armenian Table Soccer Federation	16.07.2019	16.07.2019
Austria	TischFussballBund Osterreich	22.07.2002	01.08.2006
Belgium	Belgium Table Soccer Federation	01.01.1998	01.08.2007
Bulgaria	Bulgarian Table Soccer Union	01.01.2005	01.01.2005
Czech Republic	Czech Foosball Organization	01.01.1998	01.10.2006
Denmark	Dansk Bordfodbold Forbund	01.01.1997	01.01.2007
France	Fédération Française de Football de Table	01.01.1991	01.08.2007
Germany	Deutscher Tischfussballbund	01.01.1969	01.08.2007
Italy	Lega Italiana Calcio Ballila	01.02.2017	10.02.2017
Italy	Federazione Paralimpica Italiana Calcio Balilla		
Luxembourg	Fédération de Kickersport Luxembourg	01.01.1964	01.08.2007
Netherlands	Nederlandse Tafelvoetbal Bond	01.01.1960	01.08.2007
Portugal	Federação Portuguesa de Matraquilhos	07.02.2007	15.07.2009
Serbia	Serbian Table Soccer Federation	01.01.2015	01.01.2015
Slovakia	Foosballova Unia Slovenska	01.01.2003	01.08.2007
Slovenia	Slovenian Table Soccer Association	01.01.2007	01.08.2007
Spain	Federacion Española de Futbolin	07.01.2007	01.08.2007
Switzerland	Swiss Tablesoccer Federation	01.01.2007	01.08.2007
United Kingdom	British Foosball Association	01.01.1998	01.08.2007
Canada	Table Soccer Association of Canada	01.01.2006	01.08.2007
Costa Rica	Asociación Desamparadeña de Futbol de Mesa	29.03.2016	29.03.2016
Peru	Asociación de Fútbol de Mesa del Perú	01.07.2012	01.07.2012

The Associate members include: Australia, Bangladesh, China, Georgia, Hong Kong, India, Malaysia, Nepal, Pakistan, Singapore, South Korea, United Arab Emirates, Benin, Cameroon, Congo, South Africa, Croatia, Finland, Hungary, Latvia, Poland, Romania, Russia, Turkey, Ukraine, Mexico, United States, Argentina, Bolivia, Brazil, Chile, Colombia.

== Tournaments ==
The ITSF does not organize most of the events that come under its banner. ITSF organizes the Multi-Table World Championships and World Cup, which takes place bi-annually. Entry to the championships is earned by winning (or placing very highly in) one of the official table type World Championships; by accruing enough ranking points over a number of smaller events that meet ITSF's strict criteria for events; or by becoming a national champion of a member country.

ITSF ranking tournaments are restricted in number to each member country, and ranking status is awarded based around standard of entry expected, number of players entering and prize money to be awarded.

- Multi-Table World Championships
- World Table Football Championship in USA since 1974 - Ongoing annually. (Previously International Foosball Promotions (IFP), now World Foosball Tour (WFT)
- ITSF World Table Football Championship In Euro since 2005 - Ongoing. In 2015, it was decided to host this event every two years instead of annually.
- ITSF World Table Football championship Series In Euro since 2004 - Ongoing annually.

=== USA World Table Football Championship ===
(Previously International Foosball Promotions (IFP), now World Foosball Tour (WFT)

1st in 1974 Denver United States and 47th in 2022 Lexington, Kentucky United States.

== Events ==
=== Format ===
1. Purple: ITSF World Championships + ITSF World Cup
2. Red: ITSF World Championship Series
3. Grey: ITSF European Champions League (ECL)
4. Yellow: ITSF International Series (Since 2024: ITSF 750 WT)
5. Green: ITSF Masters Series (Since 2024: ITSF 500 WT)
6. Blue: ITSF Pro Tour Series (Since 2024: ITSF 250 WT)

=== ITSF World Table Football Championship ===
2005-2014: Annual

2017-Present: Biannual

1. 2005 Italy - 1 Divisions
2. 2006 Italy - 2 Divisions
3. 2007 Italy - 4 Divisions
4. 2008 Italy - 9 Divisions
5. 2009 France - 9 Divisions
6. 2010 France - 13 Divisions
7. 2011 France - 13 Divisions
8. 2012 France - 18 Divisions
9. 2013 France - 19 Divisions
10. 2014 France - 18 Divisions
11. 2017 Germany - 25 Divisions
12. 2019 - 44 Divisions
13. 2021 France (Was held in 2022) - 40 Divisions
14. 2025 Spain - 52 divisions

=== World Cup ===
1st Table Soccer World Cup - 2006 Germany

=== World Championship Series ===
Between 3 - 6 WCS in each year Since 2004:

1. WCS Tornado 2004
2. WCS Eurosoccer 2004
3. WCS Bonzini 2004
4. WCS Roberto Sport 2004
5. WCS Tornado 2005
6. WCS Garlando 2005
7. WCS Roberto Sport 2005
8. WCS Bonzini 2005

1. World Series Garlando - ITSF World Series 2024
2. World Series Infinity 2 Legs - ITSF World Series 2024
3. World Series Leonhart - ITSF World Series 2024
4. World Series Tornado – ITSF World Series 2024
5. World Series Bonzini - ITSF World Series 2024

=== ITSF World Tour ===
The world tour has been held since 2004.

== Tables ==
A vast number of different table types exist. As of 2019, there are 5 official ITSF table brands (Bonzini, Roberto Sport, Garlando, Tornado, Leonhart), which are involved in an ITSF World Cup and World Championships and which may host an ITSF World Series.

In the past, these brands also included Fireball, Eurosoccer and Tecball. Moreover, ITSF recognises additional brands for international and professional tournaments, namely Warrior, Fireball, Ullrich Sport, Rosengart and Guardian.

=== Current ===
1. Bonzini
2. Roberto Sport
3. Garlando
4. Tornado
5. Leonhart

=== Past ===
1. Fireball
2. Eurosoccer
3. Tecball
4. Warrior
5. Ullrich Sport
6. Rosengart
7. Guardian

== See also ==
- International Foosball Promotions (IFP)
- Valley International Foosball Association (VIFA)
- Multi-Table World Championships
- Foosball
- FISTF
