= Foosball =

Table-top game similar to association football

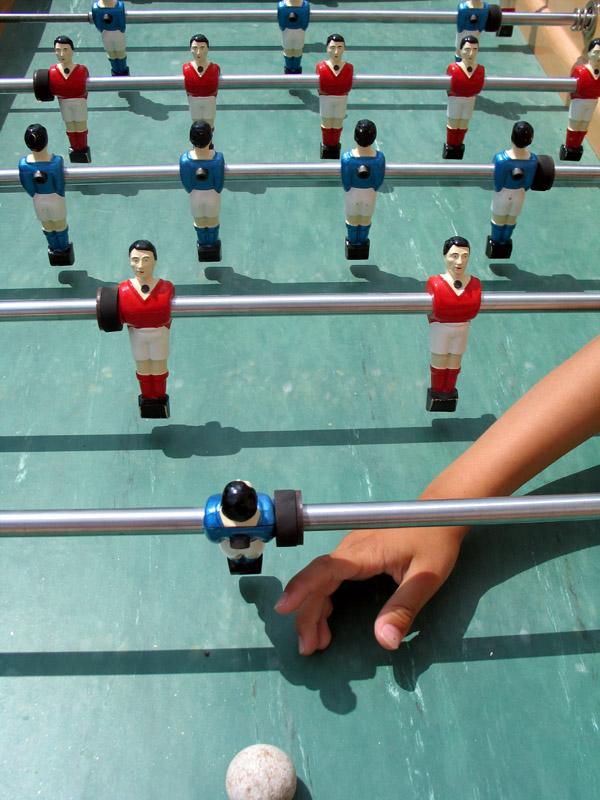
- Foosball (Bonzini style table)
- Highest governing body: International Table Soccer Federation
- Nicknames: Table soccer, table football, kicker, babyfoot
- Invented: 1921

Characteristics
- Team members: Single opponents, doubles, or teams of up to 4
- Mixed-sex: Yes
- Type: Table
- Equipment: Foosball table

Presence
- Olympic: No
- Paralympic: No

Foosball (Note: Pronounced /ˈfuːzbɔːl/ FOOZ-bawl or /ˈfuːzbɑːl/ FOOZ-bahl; from German Fußball ('association football'), pronounced [ˈfuːsbal].), also known as table soccer or table football, is a tabletop game loosely based on association football. Its objective is to move the ball into the opponent's goal by manipulating rods which have figures attached resembling football players of two opposing teams. Although its rules often vary by country and region when the game is played casually, competitive-level foosball is played according to a unified code.

== History ==
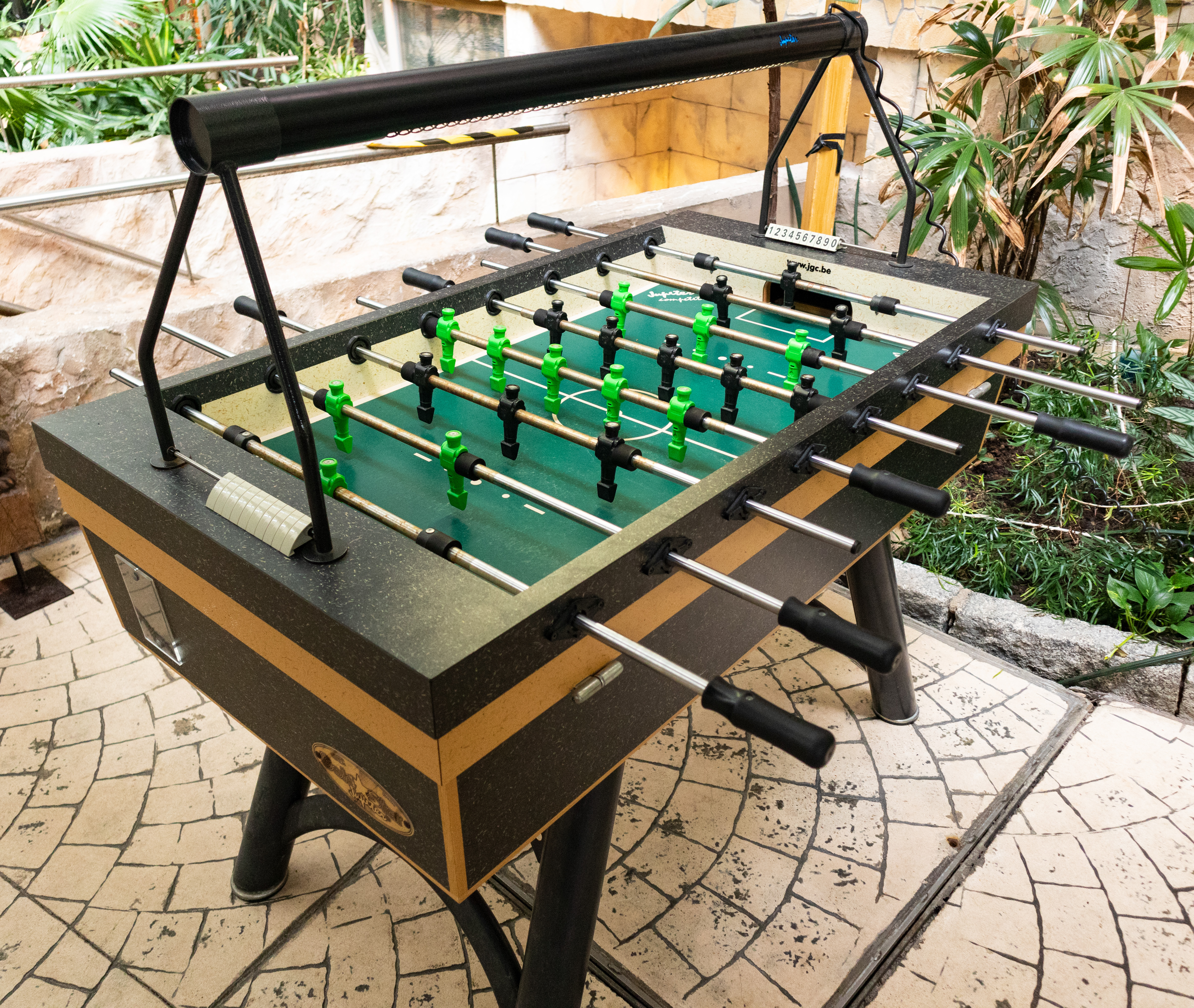
Foosball

Patents for similar table games date back as early as the 1890s in Germany and France. In 1921, Harold Searles Thornton patented the game in the United Kingdom as "Apparatus for playing a game of table football", seen as the first patent for a game with the same core playing features as the modern game. His design inspiration came from a box of matches.

Children enjoy foosball

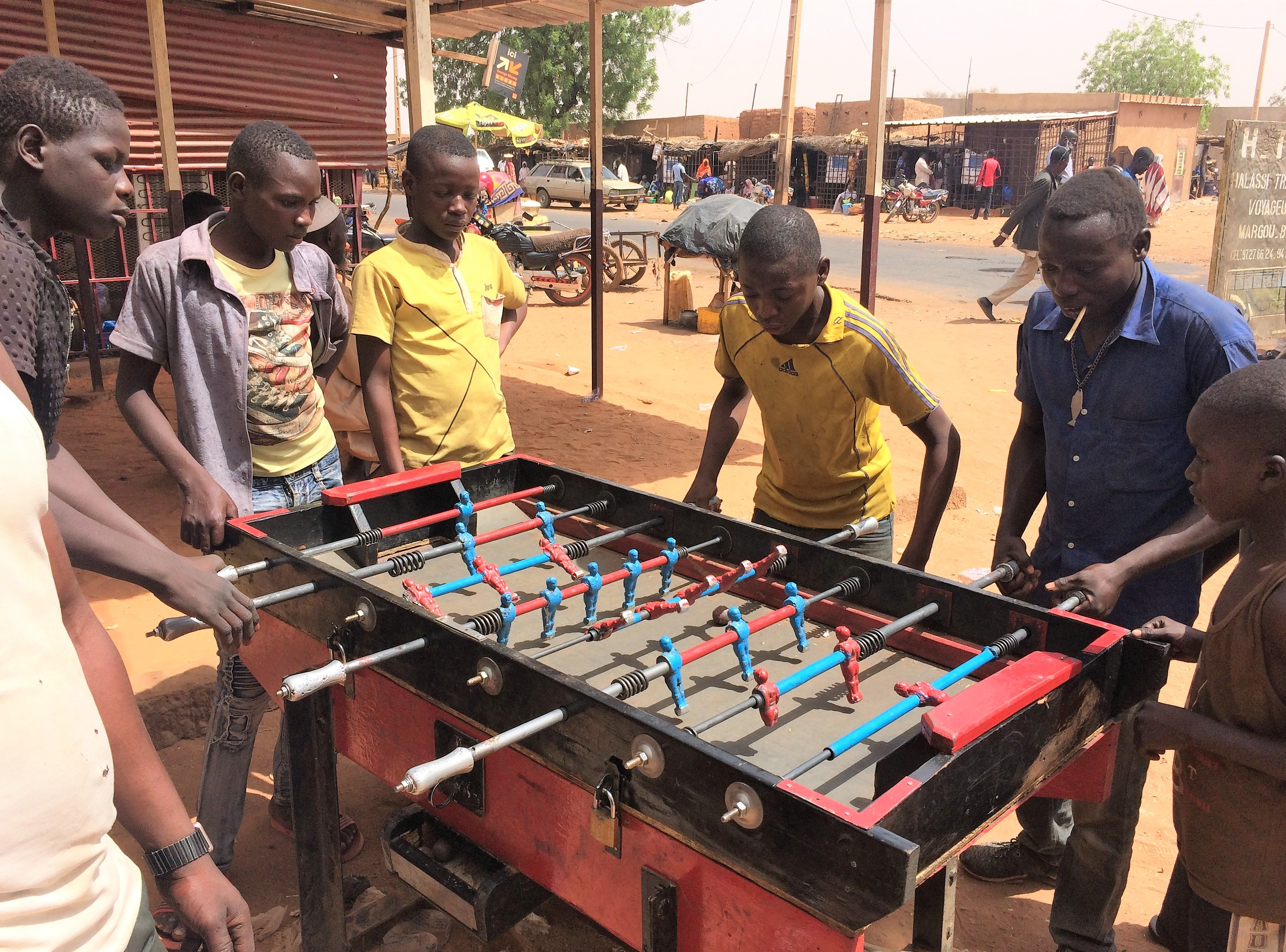
Foosball being played in Niger

Belgian magazine Le Soir illustré claimed in 1979 the French inventor Lucien Rosengart (1881–1976) came up with the game of foosball in the 1930s when he was looking for things to keep his grandchildren entertained during the cold winter months. He called the game babyfoot.

Galician inventor Alejandro Finisterre patented his invention of foosball, futbolín, in Madrid in 1937. His version is the one used in modern-day table football.

The game was eventually brought to the United States in the 1950s by Lawrence Patterson, reaching its peak of popularity there in the 1970s, when it could be found in bars and pool halls throughout the country. The name foosball became common in the United States via German imports that called it "tischfußball" (lit. "table football").

In 2002, the International Table Soccer Federation (ITSF) was established in France with the mission of promoting the game. It acts as an organising sports body, regulating international competitions and establishing the game with the International Olympic Committee and General Association of International Sport Federation.

== The game ==
Foosball during Wikimedia's hackathon

The game involves using figures mounted on rotating bars to kick a ball into the opposing goal. Foosball tables can vary in size, but a table for adult play is typically 150 cm long and 90 cm wide, while smaller tables are typically built for children. The table usually contains eight rows of foos men, which are plastic, metal, wooden, or sometimes carbon-fibre figures mounted on horizontal metal bars. Each team of one or two human players controls four rows of foos men, one row each for the goalkeeper, defenders, midfield and strikers. Players manipulate the rods to control the figures, using them to hold up, pass or 'kick' the ball. Games begin when the ball is served through a hole at the side of the table, or simply placed by hand at the feet of a figure in the centre of the table. A coin toss is usually used to determine which player or team serves first. If it is not the first match or if the ball goes out of play or stops where it cannot be played, the team scored last would get the serve after he scores one. The term for when the ball leaves the table or gets stopped somewhere out of the player figures' reach is dead ball. Expert players have been known to move balls at speeds up to 56 km/h (35 mph) in competition.

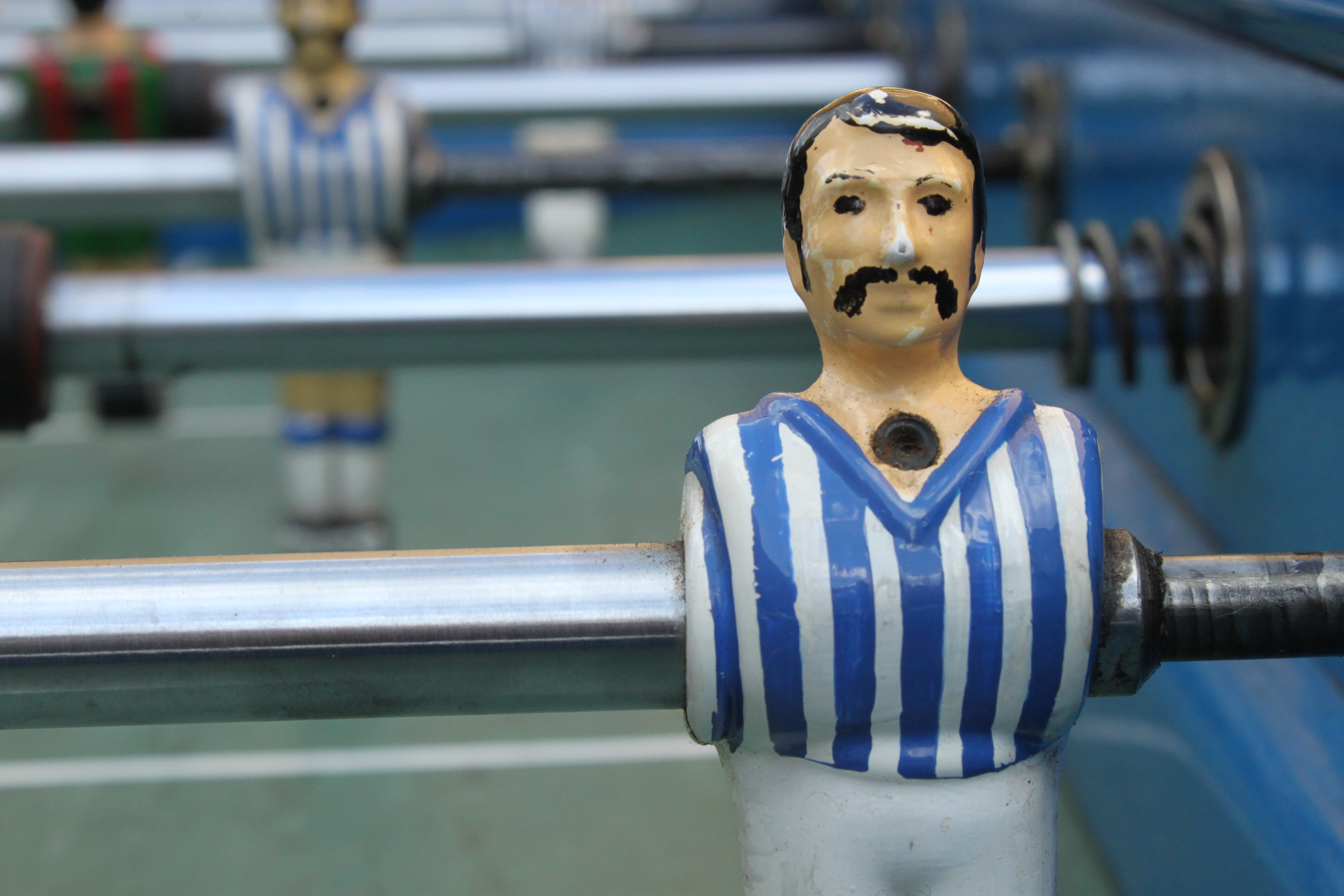
A Greek foosball player

The rules prohibit "over 360-degree shots", or "spinning": using the palm of the hand to swiftly spin the bar all around, instead of using wrist strokes to kick the ball with a bar-mounted figure. Since the establishment of the International Table Soccer Federation (ITSF), the rules have become standardized in most international competitions. The rules say that a full 360-degree rotation before or after hitting the ball is considered spinning and is forbidden (except that a spin that hits the ball backwards into the team's goal counts as an own goal against them). An ungrasped rod spun by the force of a ball hitting a player figure on it is considered legitimate. The winner is determined when one team scores a predetermined number of goals, typically five, ten or eleven in competition. When playing Bonzini competitions, the target number of goals is seven and players must win by at least two clear goals.

The following arrangement is common to ITSF competition tables, though there are substantial variations, particularly in Spain and South America, where the Futbolín table model (or variants) is common and uses a different configuration. Looking from left to right on one side of the table, the configuration is usually as follows:

Row	Position	Number of men (variant)	Typical colours
1	Goalkeeper	1 (3)	red or black
2	Defence	2 (3)	red or black
3	Opponent's attack	3 (2)	blue or white
4	Midfield	5 (4)	red or black
5	Opponent's midfield	5 (4)	blue or white
6	Attack	3 (2)	red or black
7	Opponent's defence	2 (3)	blue or white
8	Opponent's goalkeeper	1 (3)	blue or white

Foosball can be played by two individuals (singles), and also with four people (doubles), in which there are teams of two people on either side. In this scenario, one player usually controls the two defensive rows and the other team member uses the midfield and attack rows. In informal matches, three or four players per side are also common.

== Governing bodies and professional organizations ==
International and professional foosball is organized through a number of governing bodies and tournament organizations.

- International Table Soccer Federation (ITSF) — the international governing body for foosball. Founded in 2002 and based in Nantes, France, the ITSF oversees international competition, including the ITSF World Cup and World Championships, and recognizes national federations around the world.
- World Foosball Tour (WFT) — an American professional foosball tournament organization founded in 2025. WFT operates major professional and amateur tournaments including the Tour Kick-Off, Hall of Fame Classic, National Championships and World Championships, and incorporates state championship events into its rankings and tour structure. The WFT World Championships have also been televised nationally on ESPN2 as part of ESPN8: The Ocho.

== Competition ==
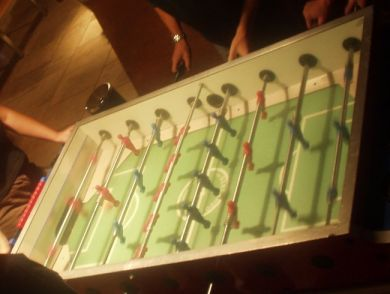
A Garlando style table with a game in progress

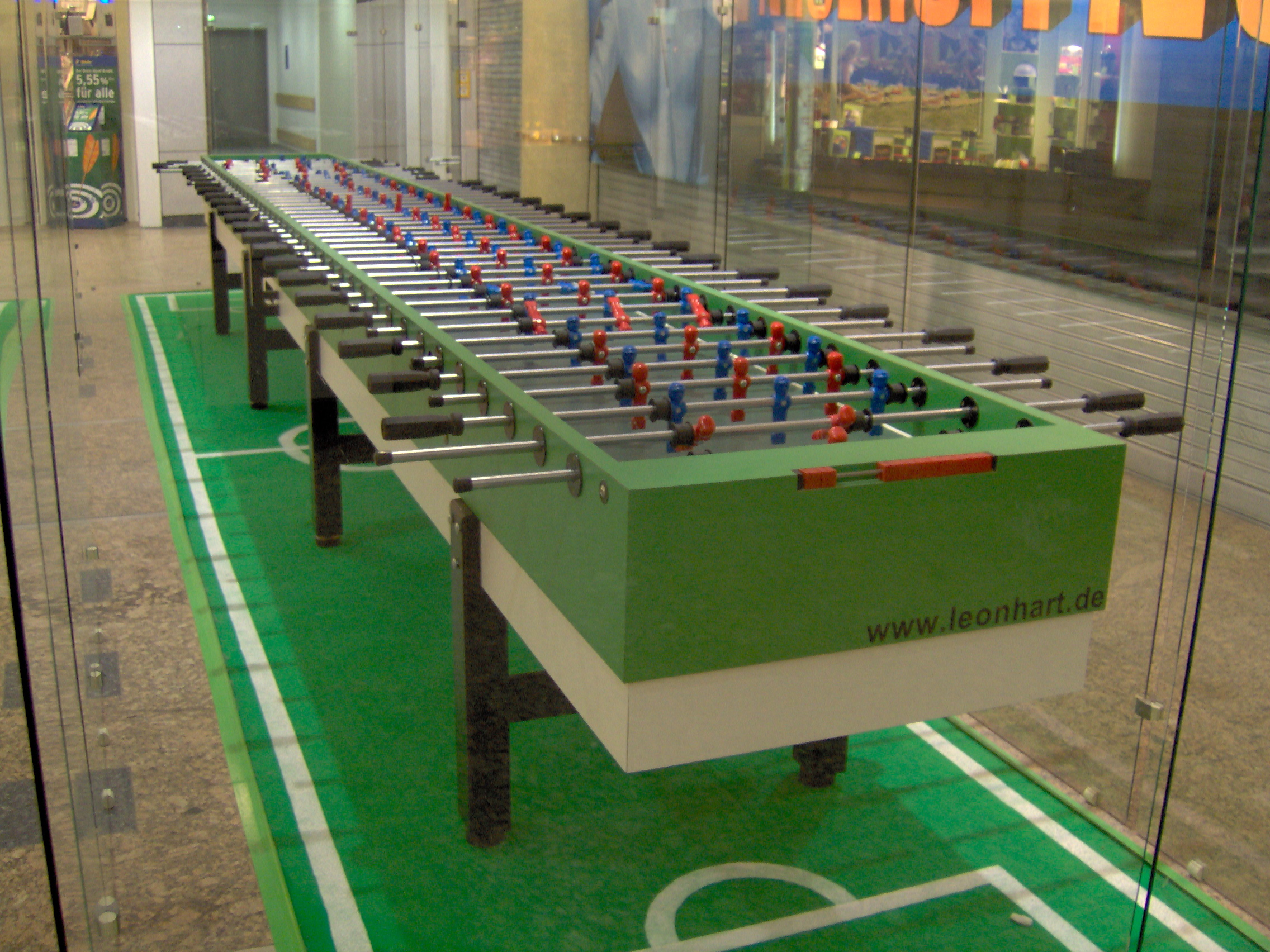
An 11-per-side Leonhart foosball game in Berlin

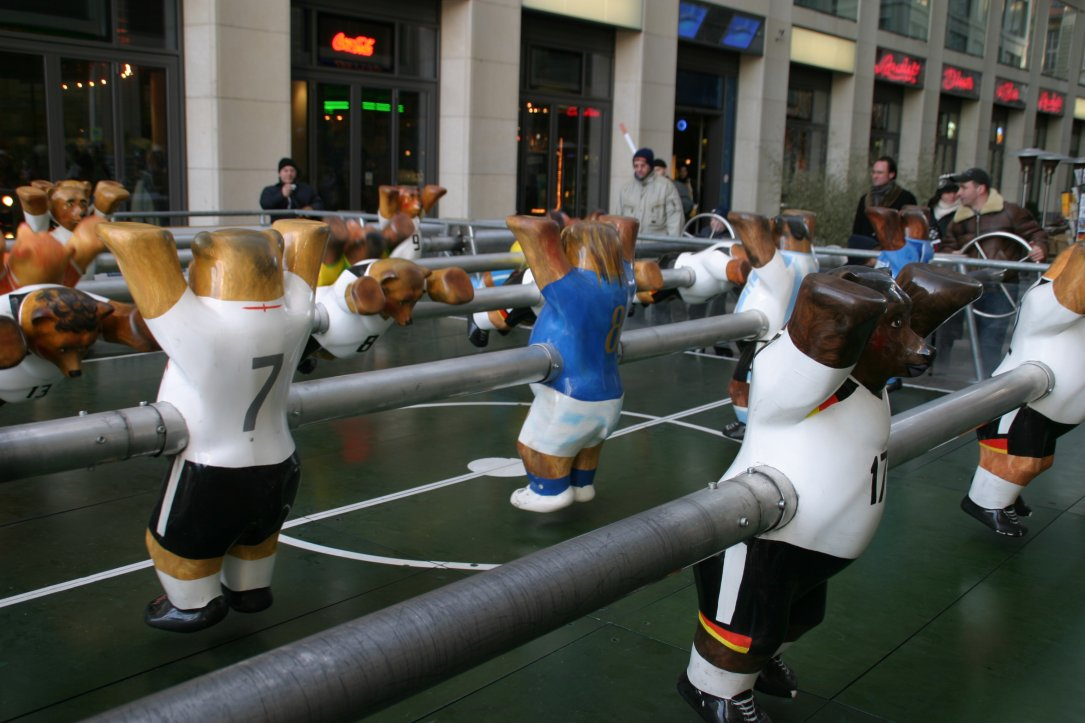
The largest foosball table using 1-metre Buddy Bear figures was set up in Berlin for the 2006 FIFA World Cup

Foosball is commonly played recreationally in pubs, bars, workplaces, schools and clubs, often with informal or locally varying rules. It is also played competitively through national federations, international governing bodies and professional tournament organizations.

The International Table Soccer Federation (ITSF) governs international competition and sanctions events including the ITSF World Cup and World Championships. Competitive foosball is played on several officially recognized table types, with rules standardized for international competition.

In the United States, the World Foosball Tour (WFT) operates a professional and amateur tournament circuit that includes major events such as the Tour Kick-Off, Hall of Fame Classic, National Championships and World Championships, as well as affiliated state championship events. WFT tournaments use modified ITSF rules, with tour-specific adjustments published in the organization's rule book.

WFT maintains a season-long points and ranking system. Major tournaments are operated directly by the tour, while state championships are hosted by local promoters and incorporated into WFT rankings and season standings.

The WFT World Championships serve as the conclusion of the tour season. The 2026 championship was held in New Orleans, Louisiana, and offered $175,000 in advertised cash, prizes and awards. Coverage of the WFT World Championships was televised nationally on ESPN2 in 2026 as part of ESPN8: The Ocho.

The ITSF World Tour has also included sanctioned tournaments in Asia, including events in China, Taiwan and Malaysia. In 2016, the Philippines hosted the Manila Bay Open.

== Tables ==
There are a great many different table types. As of 2019, there were 5 official ITSF table brands (Bonzini, Roberto Sport, Garlando, Tornado, Leonhart), which are involved in an ITSF World Cup and World Championships and which may host an ITSF World Series. In the past, these brands also included Fireball, Eurosoccer and Tecball. Moreover, ITSF recognizes additional brands for international and professional tournaments, namely Warrior, Fireball, Ullrich Sport, Rosengart and Guardian.

Several companies have created "luxury versions" of foosball tables.

Artist Maurizio Cattelan made a 7-metre table for a piece called Stadium, with 11 players to a side. Differences in the table types have great influence on the playing styles. Most European tables have one goalkeeper, whose movements are restricted to the goal area, and corners that are sloped, while a minority of brands in America use 3 goalkeepers and flat corners. Another major difference is in the balls, which can be made of a wood, cork, various plastics, or, rarely, marble or metal; the material significantly alters the speed of shots, and the "grip" between the man and the ball and the ball and the playing surface.

== Robotic players ==
The footsall robot Foosbot is claimed to have been beaten by a human several times, but has been tested against expert players. Yet another foosball robot is under development by two students at the Technical University of Denmark. The robot uses a camera mounted above an ordinary table. Another bot has been developed by two students at the EPFL in Switzerland.

== Specific terms ==
"Snake-shot" or "roll-over" are both terms used to describe when the ball is shot from the offensive players striker position with a pin near the forward of the ball and full utilization of the degrees of motion allowed. After the pin the offensive player uses their wrist to rotate their striker and shoot the ball with maximum strength towards the desired angle

"Back-stabbing", hitting the ball against the wall on a precise trajectory that makes it rebound off the wall into the opponent's goal. This move is rarely seen in professional matches due to the high skills required for execution but can be highly effective against well-organized defenses. The element of surprise and special techniques are employed to catch the opponent off guard.

== See also ==
- List of world table football champions
- Air hockey
- Button football
- Cue sports
- Fabio Cassanelli
- Football (board game)
- Pfitschigogerl
- Sports table football, the sports table football game of FISTF
- Subbuteo
- Table hockey
- Table tennis
- Paper Soccer
