= Madina Lake discography =

- Studio albums: 3
- Extended plays: 3
- Live albums: 1
- Singles: 8
- Music videos: 8

The discography of Madina Lake, an American alternative rock band, consists of three studio albums, one live album, three EPs, nine singles, and eight music videos.

== Albums ==
=== Studio albums ===
List of studio albums, with selected details and peak chart positions
Title	Album details	Peak chart positions			
Title	Album details	US	US Heat.	JPN	UK
From Them, Through Us, to You	Released: March 27, 2007; Label: Roadrunner; Format: CD, DI	154	3	—	60
Attics to Eden	Released: May 4, 2009; Label: Roadrunner; Format: CD, DI	153	3	32	44
World War III	Released: September 13, 2011; Label: Razor & Tie; Format: CD, DI	—	—	129	

=== Live albums ===
List of live albums, with selected details
Title	Album details
Live in the UK	Released: 2010; Exclusive live tour CDs.; 3 disc deluxe digipak collectors set.; Limited to only 1000 CDs of each recorded concert.; Every CD hand signed by the band.

== EPs ==
List of EPs, with selected details
Title	EP details
The Disappearance of Adalia	Released: August 22, 2006; Format: CD
The Dresden Codex	Released: December 10, 2010; Format: CD, DI
The Beginning of New Endings	Released: September 4, 2020; Format: CD, DI

== Singles ==
List of singles, with selected peak chart positions
Title	Year	Peak chart positions			Album
Title	Year	US Alt.	UK	UK Rock	Album
"House of Cards"	2007	38	—	—	From Them, Through Us, to You
"Here I Stand"	2007	—	141	2	From Them, Through Us, to You
"One Last Kiss"	2007	—	—	—	From Them, Through Us, to You
"Pandora"	2008	—	—	—	From Them, Through Us, to You
"Never Take Us Alive"	2009	—	103	10	Attics to Eden
"Let's Get Outta Here"	2009	—	96	3	Attics to Eden
"Welcome to Oblivion"	2009	—	—	—	Attics to Eden
"They're Coming for Me"	2010	—	—	—	The Dresden Codex
"Hey Superstar"	2011	—	—	—	World War III
"Imagineer"	2012	—	—	—	World War III
"Across 5 Oceans"	2012	—	—	17	World War III
"Playing with Fire"	2020	—	—	—	The Beginning of New Endings
"Heart of Gold"	2020	—	—	—	The Beginning of New Endings
"Loser" (Beck cover)	2020	—	—	—	Non-album singles
"—" denotes a release that did not chart.

== Music videos ==
List of music videos
Year	Title	Director(s)
2006	"One Last Kiss"	
2007	"House of Cards"	Nicholas Hill
2007	"Here I Stand"	Dori Oskowitz
2007	"One Last Kiss"	Brian Thompson
2008	"Pandora"	
2009	"Never Take Us Alive"	Shane Drake
2009	"Let's Get Outta Here"	
2009	"Welcome to Oblivion"	
2011	"Hey Superstar"	Andrew Bennett
2011	"Imagineer"	
2012	"Across 5 Oceans"	John Kopanski
