= Hoc =

Hoc or HOC may refer to:

- Head of Chancery
- Hellenic Olympic Committee, one of the oldest National Olympic Committees
- Hoc (Beowulf), a Danish King from Beowulf
- Hoc (programming language), a calculator and programming language
- Hypertrophic cardiomyopathy (Hypertrophic (Obstructive) cardiomyopathy), but HCM is the more common and accepted acronym for that condition
- House of Commons, a legislative body of elected representatives in various countries
- Hooked on Classics, an album of popular classical music
- Pointe du Hoc, a cliff in Normandy scaled by the U.S. Rangers in 1944
- House of Cards (disambiguation)
- Ho language, identified by the ISO 639 3 code hoc
- United States House Committee on Oversight and Reform, known as the House Oversight Committee
- Hoc (card game), the progenitor of a family of French card games using hocs or 'stops'

== See also ==
- Ad hoc, a Latin phrase meaning a solution designed for a specific problem or task
- Post hoc (disambiguation)
- Propter hoc (disambiguation)
