= Hockey (disambiguation) =

Hockey is a family of team games.

Hockey may also refer to:

== People ==
- Joe Hockey (born 1965), Australian politician
- Lisbeth Hockey (1918–2004), British nurse and researcher
- Susan Hockey (born 1946), British professor of information studies
- William Hockey (born 1989), American engineer and entrepreneur
- "Mr. Hockey", a nickname carried by Canadian ice hockey player Gordie Howe (1928–2016)

== Arts, entertainment, media ==
- Hockey (album), 1980 John Zorn album
- Hockey (band), American indie rock band
- Hockey (1981 video game), published by Gamma Software for Atari 8-bit computers
- Hockey (1992 video game), published by Atari Corporation for the Atari Lynx

== Sports ==
- hockey, an alternative spelling of oche, the hocking line in darts
- ice hockey, known as "hockey" in North America and parts of Europe
- field hockey, known as "hockey" in South Asia, parts of Europe, Oceania and Africa

== Other uses ==
- Horkey, a harvest custom in England and Ireland also known as 'Hock(e)y'

== See also ==
- Hokie
- Hoky
- Hokey (disambiguation)
- Hock (disambiguation)
- Hok (disambiguation)
- Hoc (disambiguation)
