= Tabletop football =

Tabletop game that loosely simulates football

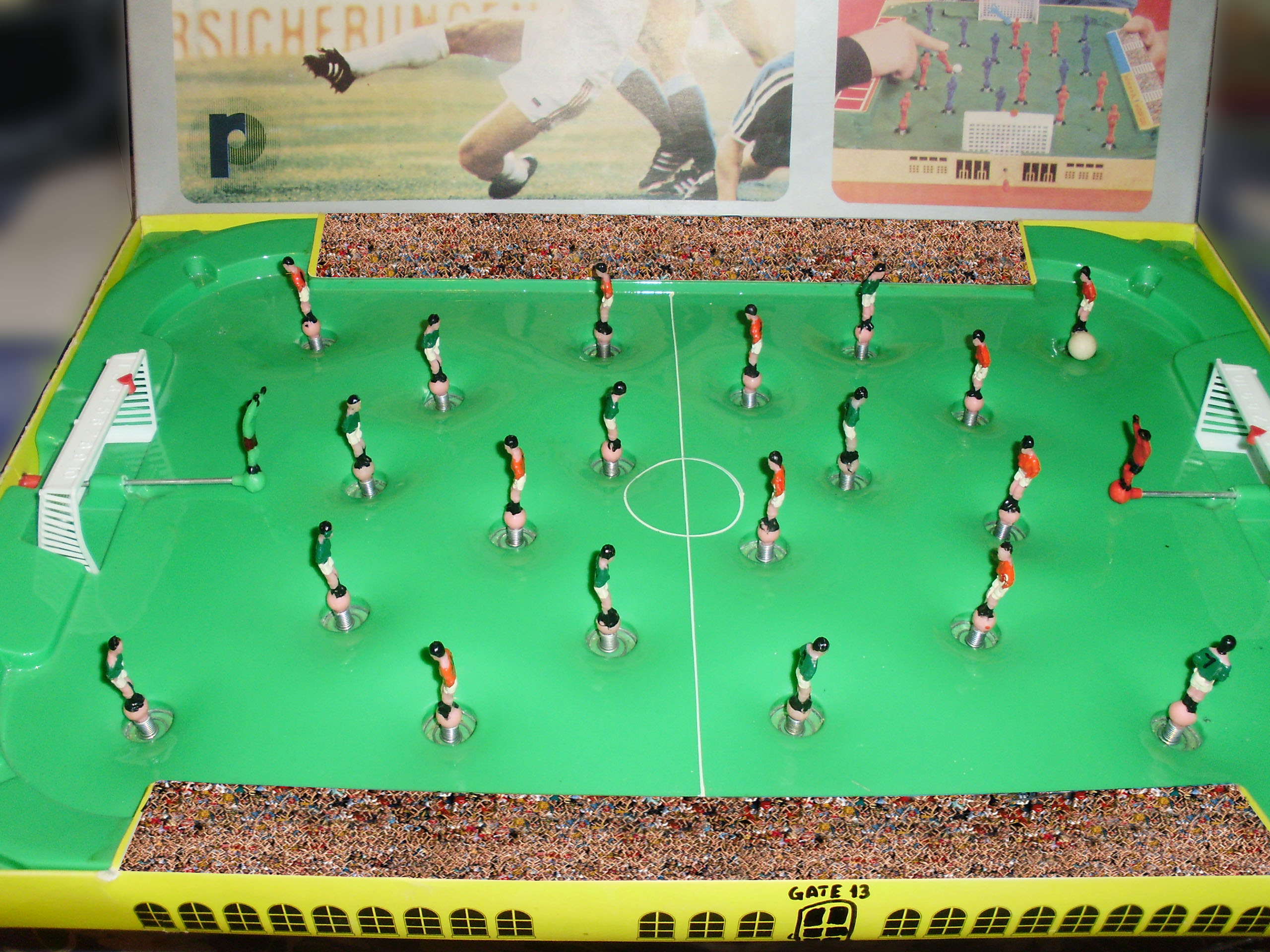
A table football game from the 1980s

Tabletop football is a class of tabletop game simulating mainly association football, but also either of the codes of rugby, or some other form of football such as American football or Australian rules football. The games employ miniature figures of players on a bounded playing board or table that looks like a football pitch (field).

== Types ==
Implementations vary:

- The player figures may each be on a weighted or magnetic base, so that one can be flicked across the flat field to strike the ball (which may actually be a disc or a non-spherical object similar to polyhedral dice) and drive it to the goal between the opposing player's figures. Each player's goalkeeper (in forms of football with that role) is independently movable on a stick, usually in an arc but sometimes in a straight slot, to block incoming shots. Subbuteo is the best-known brand of this sort of game, using tiny models of human players. A competitive sport in its own right, sports table football, has developed around this style of game equipment. A variation among the movable-piece games has figures whose heads can be pressed down to fire a spring-loaded kick with a moving leg. Button football uses colored disks instead of figurines; game play is similar to that of carrom and various related games with a disk-flicking action but without a team-sports theme.
- Model figures may be attached to the board with springs or magnets, and flicked with a forefinger to "kick" the ball without moving away from their fixed positions. The board is indented around each figure so that the ball will always roll into a flickable position. The goalie may be independently movable in a slot or on a stick.
- For gridiron forms of football, a ball-carrying figure may be moved magnetically down-field, with the player trying to dodge the controlled or randomly-moving figures of the opposing player's "team".
- Unrelated except in spirit, table football (also known as foosball or table soccer) is an in-table rather than on-table game, featuring player figures fixed on turning rods.

== History ==
Inspired by home-made games involving children flicking marbles, bits of paper (as in paper football), coins and other discs (as in penny football and early button football), and other objects with their fingers to crudely simulate team sports, tabletop football games have been developed and released in commercially available packages under various trademarked titles over many decades. The earliest was Newfooty in 1929, and this style of game was popularised much further by Subbuteo in 1946 (later also available to simulate non-football sports like cricket and various forms of hockey), and in franchise-branded versions like Lego Soccer in 2000.

A computer simulation of tabletop soccer was created as a video game, Magnetic Soccer, developed by Nintendo.

== Organised competition ==
As a competitive activity – something of a sport in its own right – tabletop association football (some countries call it soccer) with freely movable figures on weighted bases is known as sports table football, played under rules published by the Federation of International Sports Table Football (FISTF), with an annual world cup competition since 1993, and Confederation Championships or Cups, hosted in a rotating fashion in one of the countries with a national FISTF-affiliated Association (called Member National Association, MNA). Though originally begun with Newfooty-brand (1929) and Subbuteo-brand (1947) equipment, many specialist companies now produce game pieces, such as bases, figures, goalkeepers, goals, pitches, complete playing board and tables, boxes or coffers for sets and many other fine accessories, for serious players.

== See also ==
- Electric Football
- Table football
- Table hockey games
