= Malao (disambiguation) =

Several uses of Malao are known to Wikipedia:

- a character in The Five Ancestors, children's series
- a location in Vanuatu
- the ancient city-state of Malao on the Somali peninsula identified with the historic city of Berbera.
