= Hok =

Hok may refer to:

== People ==
- Åke Hök (1889–1963), Swedish military officer and Olympic horse rider
- Hok Lundy (1950–2008), National Police Commissioner of Cambodia
- Hok Sochetra (born 1974), Cambodian football player
- Hokuto Konishi (born 1984) Japanese-American dancer

== Other uses ==
- HOK (firm), an American worldwide design, architecture and urban planning firm
  - HOK Sport, now Populous, a firm that designs sports venues
- Hok, Sweden, a village
- Hok/sok system, a host-killing gene of the R1 E. coli plasmid
- Army Operational Command (Denmark) (Danish: Hærens Operative Kommando)
- Henge of Keltria, a druid order
- Hokan languages, a hypothetical language family of indigenous languages of North America
- Hong Kong, UNDP country code
- Hong Kong station, a station of the Hong Kong MTR
- House of Krazees, a hip hop group from Detroit
- Kaman HOK, a U.S. Navy helicopter
- Hok, a fictional character in The Five Ancestors
- Hooker Creek Airport, IATA airport code "HOK"
