= House of Cards =

House of Cards usually refers to:

- House of cards, a structure formed of playing cards as a hobby
- House of Cards (novel), a 1989 novel by Michael Dobbs
- House of Cards (British TV series), a 1990 BBC four-part television drama series based on the Dobbs novel
- House of Cards (American TV series), a 2013 Netflix television drama series based on the novel and UK miniseries

House of Cards may also refer to:

== Films ==
- House of Cards (1917 film), a film by Alice Guy-Blaché
- House of Cards (1943 film), a Spanish film directed by Jerónimo Mihura
- House of Cards (1968 film), a film starring George Peppard, Inger Stevens and Orson Welles
- House of Cards (1993 film), a film starring Kathleen Turner and Tommy Lee Jones

== Literature ==
- House of Cards, 1967 novel by Stanley Ellin
- House of Cards (Cohan book), a 2009 non-fiction book by William D. Cohan
- "House of Cards", a 2004–2005 comic book storyline in Astonishing X-Men: Gambit

== Music ==
- House of Cards (Saga album), 2001
- House of Cards (The Amity Affliction album), 2026
- "House of Cards" (Mary Chapin Carpenter song) (1994)
- "House of Cards" (Lynsey de Paul song)
- "House of Cards" (Madina Lake song) (2007)
- "House of Cards" (Radiohead song) (2007)
- "House of Cards" (James Reyne song) (1989)
- "House of Cards", a song by BTS from The Most Beautiful Moment in Life: Young Forever
- "House of Cards", a song by Gang Gajang
- "House of Cards", a 1975 song by Elton John
- "House of Cards", a 2014 song by Coldrain from Until the End
- "House of Cards", a 2017 song by Manafest from Stones
- "House of Cards", a 2015 song by Scorpions from Return to Forever
- "House of Cards", a 2008 song by STEMM from Blood Scent
- "House of Cards", a song by The Cooper Temple Clause
- "House of Cards", a song recorded by The Seekers
- "House of Cards", a 1978 song by Richard Thompson from First Light
- "Houses of Cards", a 2000 song by Zeromancer from Clone Your Lover

== Television ==
- "House of Cards" (Doctors), a 2003 episode of series 5 of Doctors
- "House of Cards" (Yes, Dear episode), a 2003 episode of series 3 of Yes, Dear
- "House of Cards", a 1995 episode of ER
- "House of Cards", a 2005 episode of Law & Order

== Other uses ==
- House of Cards, a 1919 painting by Zinaida Serebriakova
- House of Cards, a card construction game designed by Charles Eames
- Operation House of Cards, a military strike by Israel in Syria against Iranian targets on May 10, 2018
