= Subbuteo =

Tabletop association football game

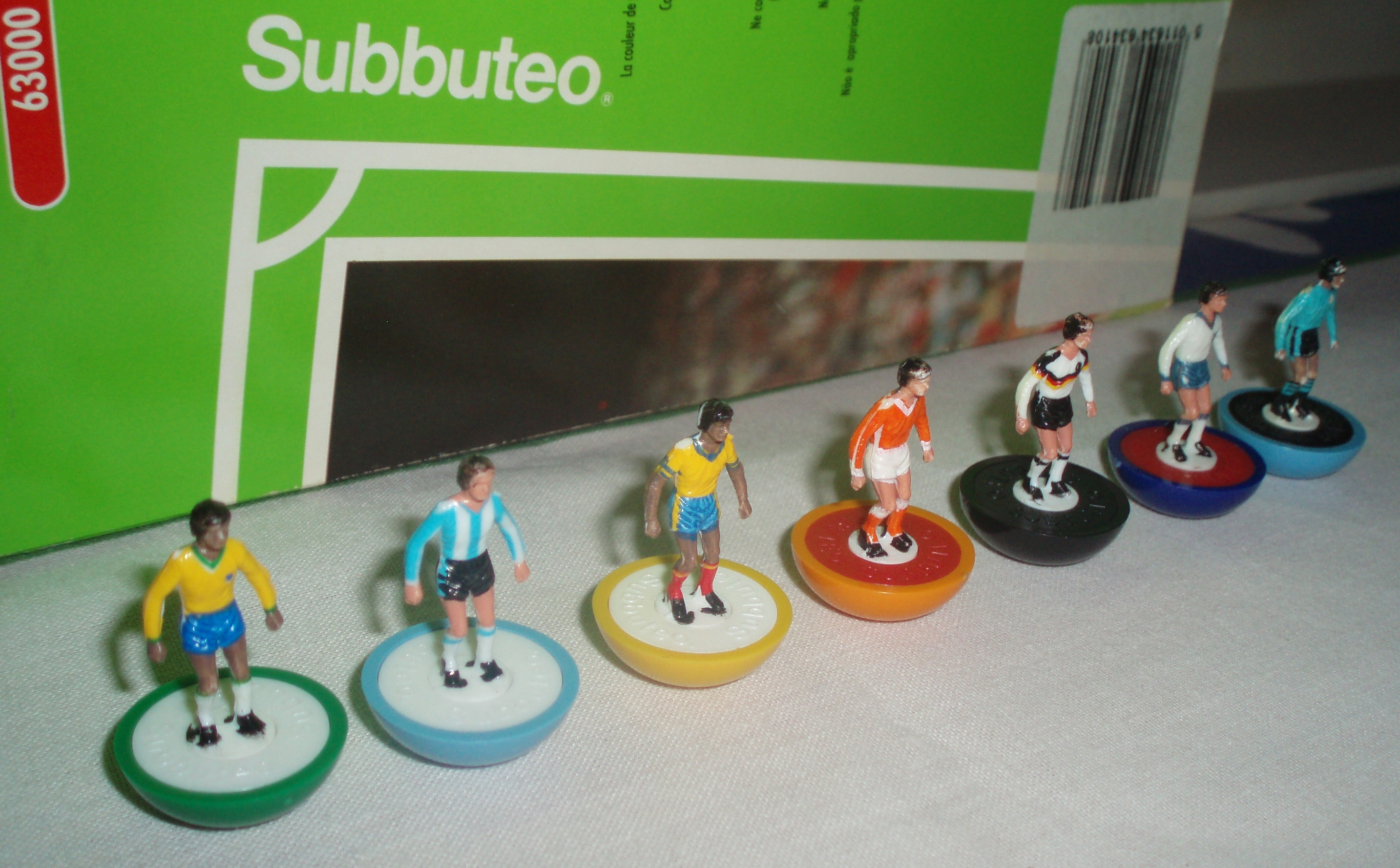
- Subbuteo players
- Designers: Peter Adolph
- Publishers: Hasbro
- Genres: Tabletop football
- Players: 2 or 4
- Setup time: 2 minutes
- Playing time: 20–30 minutes
- Chance: Very low
- Age range: 8 and up
- Skills: Dexterity, tactics

Subbuteo (/sʌˈb(j)uːtioʊ/ sub-(Y)OO-tee-oh) is a tabletop football game in which players simulate association football by flicking miniature players with their fingers. Its name derives from the scientific name of the hobby falcon, Falco subbuteo. Peter Adolph (1916–1994), the game's creator, had wanted to call it "Hobby", but he was unable to obtain the trademark.

While most closely associated with the football game, versions of Subbuteo based on other team sports, such as cricket, both codes of rugby, and hockey, have also been produced.

== History ==
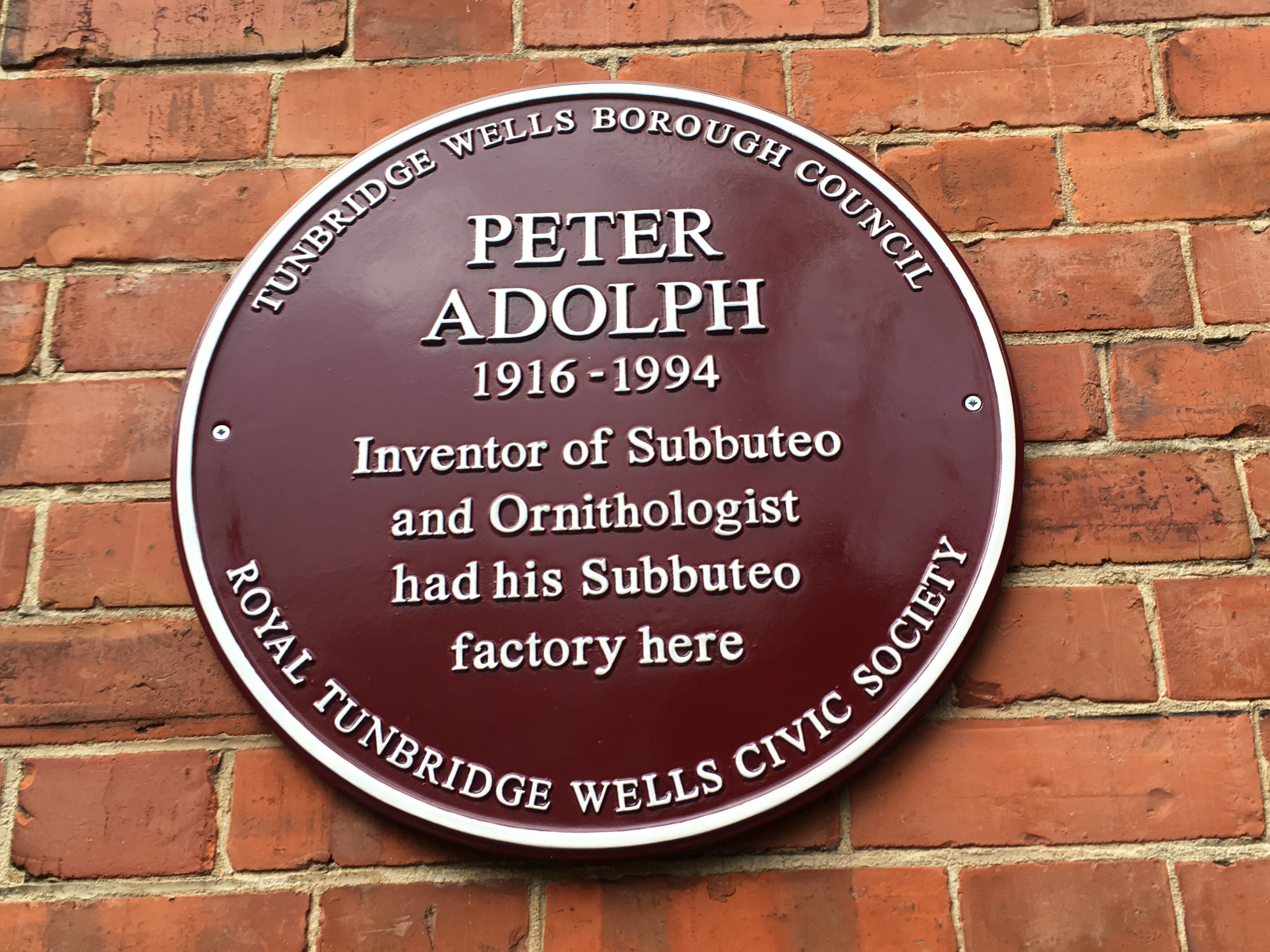
A heritage plaque commemorating Peter Adolph's Subbuteo factory in Royal Tunbridge Wells

Subbuteo was invented by Peter Adolph (1916–1994), who was demobbed from the Royal Air Force after the end of World War II. Searching for a new business opportunity he turned his attention to creating a new table-top football game. He adapted his game from Newfooty, a table football game that had been invented in 1929 by William Lane Keeling of Liverpool. He made numerous improvements, including changing the heavy lead bases under the model players to lighter materials, using for his prototype a button from his mother's coat and a washer.

In August 1946 Peter Adolph filed an outline patent application for the game, which was finalised in May 1947. The August 1946 edition of The Boy's Own Paper first announced Subbuteo's availability and offered to send details. In March 1947, sets were first available. According to rumours, after the early adverts, orders started to pour in as Adolph set about converting his patent idea into a deliverable product.

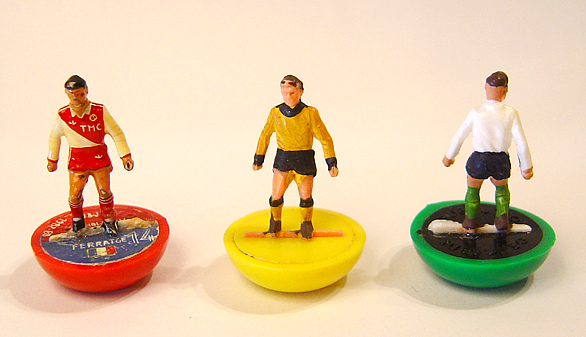
Heavy weight players from the 1970s. The one on the left is a customised figurine representing an AS Monaco player. The other two are as originally painted, reference 6 in yellow and ref 65 in white, representing England

The first Subbuteo sets, known as the Assembly Outfits, consisted of goals made of wire with paper nets, a cellulose acetate ball, cardboard playing figures in two basic kits (red shirts with white shorts, and blue shirts with white shorts) and bases made from buttons weighed down with lead washers. The story is that Peter found one of his mother's coat buttons and used Woolworth buttons for the early set bases.

No pitch was provided: instead, the purchaser was given instructions on how to mark out, with provided chalk, a playing area on to a blanket. An old army blanket was recommended. The first sets were available in March 1947, several months after the original advertisement appeared. The first figures were made of flat cardboard cut out of a long strip. Later these card players came in press-out strips before being replaced with two-dimensional celluloid figures, known to collectors as "flats".

Early production of Subbuteo was centred in Langton Green, near Royal Tunbridge Wells in Kent. Following the advent of the OO scale players, the player figures were individually hand painted by local outworkers in their own homes.

In its early years, Subbuteo had a fierce rivalry with Newfooty. In the run-up to Christmas 1961, Adolph introduced a three-dimensional handpainted plastic figure into the range. After several design modifications, this figure evolved by 1967 into the classic "heavyweight" figure pictured. Newfooty ceased trading in 1961 after a failed television advertising campaign but its demise is thought to be linked to the launch of the moulded Subbuteo players.

There were several further evolutions of figure design. In 1978 the "zombie" figure was introduced to facilitate the machine painting of figures. After much negative feedback, the zombie figure was replaced in 1980 by the "lightweight" figure that continued until the 1990s when Hasbro acquired Waddingtons Games, which owned Subbuteo.

After Hasbro bought Waddington Games in 1994, Subbuteo sales declined from about 150,000 sets per year to 3,000 in 2002 and just 500 sets in 2003, when production was stopped.

In 2005, Hasbro relaunched Subbuteo with flat photorealistic card-style figures on bases, rather than three-dimensional figures. The relaunch was not a success and was again discontinued.

In 2012, Hasbro licensed Subbuteo to Eleven Force and it returned to the shops with a new style of three-dimensional rubber figures, launching Subbuteo into its eighth decade of production. Subbuteo also made other things for the collector, such as stands to create a stadium, cups, crowds, policemen and much more.

In 2020, Hasbro awarded the licence to Longshore, although Eleven Force remained Subbuteo's Spanish distributor. It was reported that Hasbro had been unhappy with Elevenforce's lack of interest in markets outside Spain. In May 2020, Subbuteo World, a long-term UK seller of Subbuteo, announced it was advising Longshore, and that there would be new teams, a Subbuteo VAR set, and new fences.

Subbuteo is a registered trademark of Hasbro Inc.

== Gameplay ==
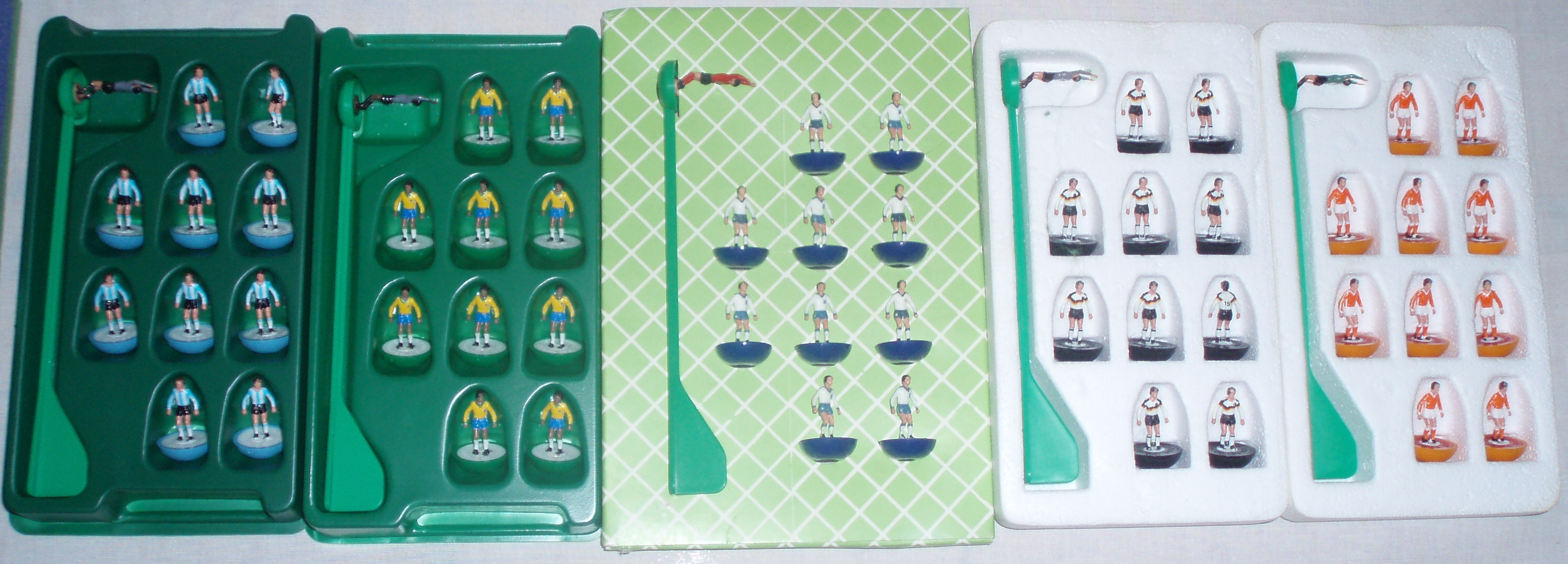
Subbuteo inside packs

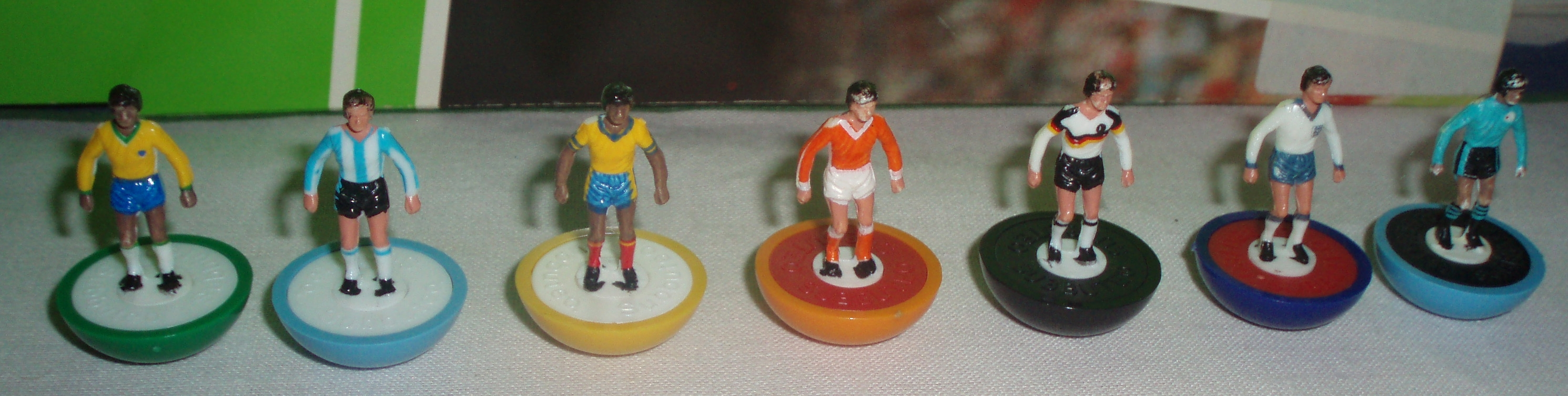
Subbuteo players

Playing Subbuteo is a physical simulation of association football, involving dexterity and skill in flicking the playing figures, which stand on weighted bases, across the tabletop pitch towards the ball.

Hundreds of team kits and accessories are available, almost all representing real teams, with the exception of comic book team Melchester Rovers. Along with major teams such as Chelsea, Manchester City, and Real Madrid, unpainted models are available. There are many additional accessories, such as new balls and goals, special figures for free kicks and throw-ins, stands and crowd, linesmen, ball-boys, streakers and policemen, floodlights and TV cameras.

The rules are designed to correspond closely with those of association football, albeit with some simplifications and alterations. Players maintain possession as long as the figure they flick makes contact with the ball and the ball does not subsequently hit an opposing figure, although the same figure cannot be used for more than three consecutive flicks.

Shots at goal can be taken only once the ball is over the 'shooting line', a line parallel to and equidistant between the goal line and half-way line. The goalkeeper figures are attached to, and manoeuvered with, a rod that fits underneath the back of the goal. The offside law is in effect, but only pertaining to figures that are forward of the opposing team's shooting line, as opposed to the half-way line, as in actual football.

== Subbuteo World Cup ==
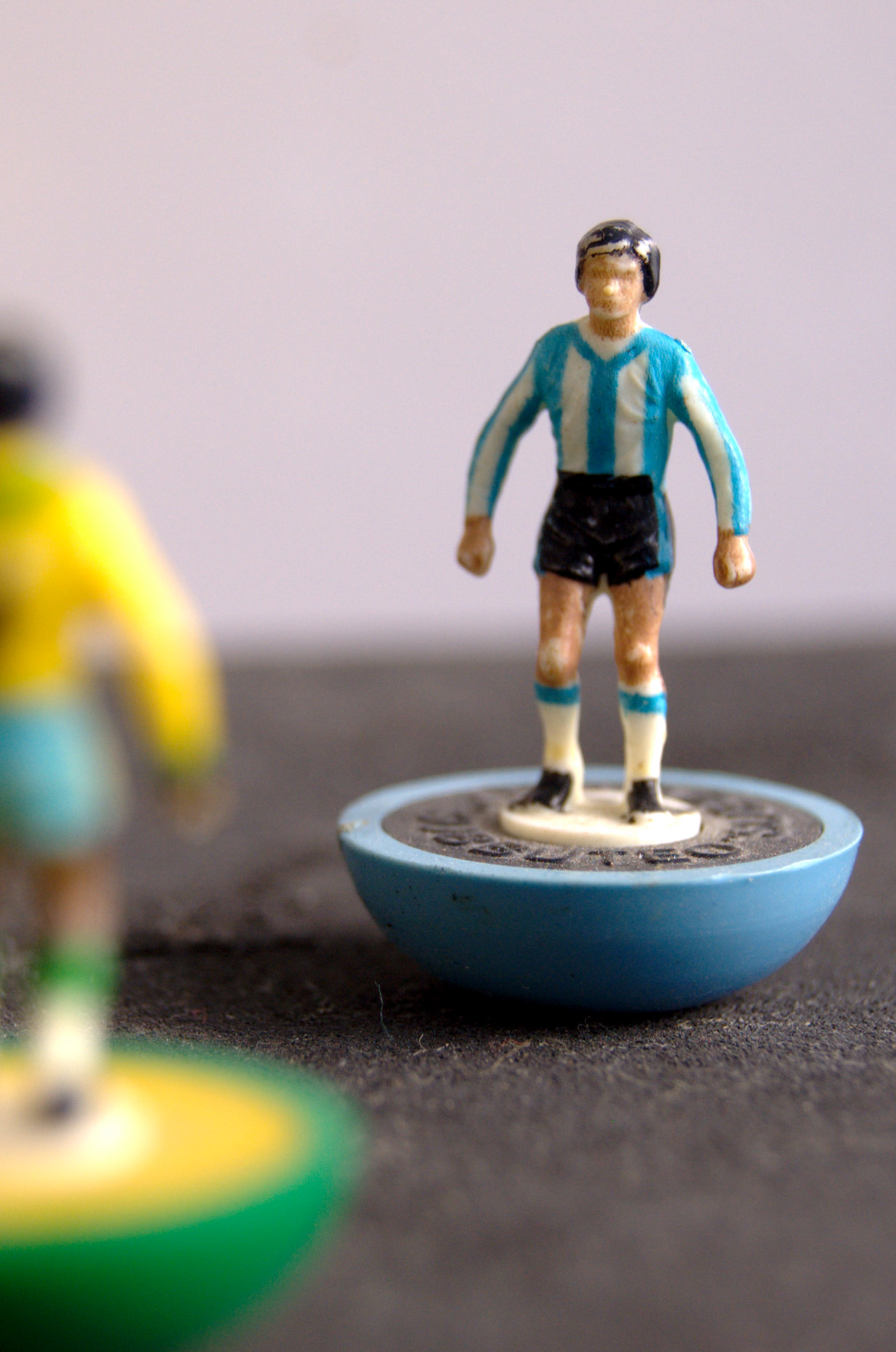
Players in national team colours from the late 1980s. The main figure is in the colours of the reference 457 Argentina team. The figure in the foreground is in the colours of the reference 410 Brazil team

There is a Subbuteo World Cup competition. In 2024, it was hosted by Royal Tunbridge Wells to commemorate the town being the birthplace of the game.

Here are the previous winners of the Subbuteo World Cup.

| Year | Host | Location | Winners | Runners-up |
|---|---|---|---|---|
| 1970 | England | London | West Germany | |
| 1974 | West Germany | Munich | Netherlands | England |
| 1978 | England | London | Belgium | |
| 1982 | Spain | Barcelona | Italy | |
| 1986 | Greece | Athens | Switzerland | |
| 1990 | Italy | Rome | Greece | |
| 1994 | United States | Chicago | Belgium | |
| 1994 | France | Paris | Belgium | |
| 1996 | Denmark | Silkeborg | Portugal | |
| 1998 | Belgium | Namur | Belgium | |
| 2000 | Austria | Vienna | Italy | |
| 2001 | Portugal | Porto | Italy | |
| 2002 | England | Birmingham | Belgium | |
| 2003 | Malta | Cottonera | Italy | |
| 2004 | Italy | Bologna | Italy | |
| 2005 | Belgium | Tournai | Italy | |
| 2006 | Germany | Dortmund | Italy | |
| 2007 | France | Les Herbiers | Italy | |
| 2008 | Austria | Vienna | England | |
| 2009 | Netherlands | Rotterdam | Italy | |
| 2010 | Germany | Rain am Lech | Spain | |
| 2011 | Italy | Palmeiro | Italy | |
| 2012 | England | Manchester | Spain | |
| 2013 | Spain | Madrid | Spain | |
| 2014 | Belgium | Rochefort | Spain | |
| 2015 | Italy | San Benedetto | Spain | |
| 2016 | Belgium | Frameries | Austria | |
| 2017 | France | Elancourt | Belgium | |
| 2018 | Gibraltar | Gibraltar | Italy | |
| 2022 | Italy | Rome | Spain | |
| 2024 | England | Royal Tunbridge Wells | Italy | |

== FISTF ==
International Sports Table Football (FISTF) was founded on 16 June 1992 in Hamburg (Germany).

Merging:

- European Tablesoccer (Football) Federation (ETF 1963-1993)
- Federation of International Subbuteo Associations (FISA 1979-1996).
- European Tablesoccer Federation (ETF)
- Federation of International Subbuteo Associations (FISA)

FISTF lays down the playing rules of Table Football.

== Other sports ==
The cricket version used the traditional Subbuteo base. The little plastic bat broke easily.

== Video game ==
A digital version was released by Goliath Games in 1990 for the Amiga, Atari ST, MS-DOS, Amstrad CPC, Commodore 64, and ZX Spectrum. CU Amiga gave the game a rating of 95% and said "Goliath have managed to distill the essential elements of the original game and transfer them across to the Amiga."

== See also ==
- Table football
- Table cricket
