= Table Cricket =

Tabletop game

Table cricket can refer to

- An indoor miniature version of cricket played on a large table top, designed for physically challenged cricketers
- A recreational tabletop game from the 1960s, popular in the United Kingdom and the Indian subcontinent, presently enjoying a return to popularity

== The indoor game ==
The indoor game was designed to provide cricketers with severe physical or learning disabilities an opportunity to play cricket. However, the game can be played by people of all ages and ability levels. It was developed by Doug Williamson via Project Adapted at Nottingham Trent University in 1992.

=== Goals ===
Table cricket is an indoor team game, and has similar goals with regards to cricket. Two six-member teams compete against each other, with the objective being to score more runs.

=== Set up ===
The game is played on top of a table tennis board, or a surface of similar dimensions. At one end of the board is a spring loading bowling machine, at the other end the batsman wields a miniature wooden bat. The other two sides of the table are panelled off, with the option of placing symbolic fielders on the sides.

=== Rules ===
Each individual innings lasts for a maximum of two overs. Batsmen can get out in six different ways, including being bowled out, or being "caught out" by hitting the ball near the symbolic fielders.

Runs are scored by hitting the ball into designated side panel areas for 2, 4 or 6 (maximum) runs. Wide balls are penalized with 4 runs to the batting team.

=== Infrastructure ===
The indoor game is played in England, Australia and South Africa. The England and Wales Cricket Board presides over an annual national tournament funded and organized by the charity Lord's Taverners - the Lord's Taverners National Table Cricket Competition, based on 10 regional tournaments, with the final being played at the Indoor Cricket School, Lord's Cricket Ground. The 2006 finals were attended by the Indian cricket star Sachin Tendulkar.

== The recreational table top game ==
The recreational table top cricket game was made popular by a British table top game manufacturer Subbuteo from the 1960s, which has inspired numerous versions and clones over the years. The goals of the game are the same as that of cricket. It was developed by the table top game entrepreneur Peter Adolph, being marketed as early as 1949.

=== Equipment ===
The batsman and bowler are spring loading equipment where the direction and speed of the ball, power, timing and positioning of the batsman's shot can be controlled. The ball is a small metal ball-bearing. The playing field is typically a large green sheet or carpet of cloth which is laid out on the table, and on which the game is played. The playing field has demarcations for the pitch, as well as zones of 1,2,3 and 4 runs. 10 fielders - besides the bowler - with ball-channeling mouths at the base of the miniature statuettes can be placed on the field.

=== Rules ===
The bowler pre-sets the location of the bowling mechanism at the edge of the pitch. The bowler loads the ball onto the release mechanism (spring or gravity controlled), whereupon the ball rolls towards the batsman. The batsman has to pre-set the angle of the face of the bat shown, and the location of the batting mechanism. He controls the power and timing of the shot in real time. After hitting the bat, the ball may roll and rest in one of the marked run zones on the playing carpet (in which case the batsman obtains runs), or be channelled into the base of a fielder's statuette (in which case the batsman is deemed out caught). The batsman could also be out bowled (inc. played on) or hit wicket. Wides and byes may also be scored.
