= Newfooty =

Early table football game

Newfooty is a tabletop football game played by flicking figures towards the ball.

== History ==
The Newfooty Limited Company was established in Liverpool by Mr. William Lane Keeling (Born 20th May 1900, died 1976) in 1929, the year when the patent was officially registered at the patent office in Liverpool. The initial Newfooty Patent ran from 1929–1934, followed by a further five year period of 1934–1939.

Newfooty introduced the idea of flicking the figures with a finger towards the ball and was the initial table football game, long before the similar game of Subbuteo. Newfooty can lay claim to being the original finger-flicking table soccer game which many players enjoy today. First manufactured in 1929 by Mr William (Will) Lane Keeling in Liverpool, the original game has recently reached more fame than in the past, due to the internet years and information sharing. The first manufactured figures were flat from card (cardboard, paper), followed later by the plastic (celluloid) version.

After the Second World War, Newfooty had a rival in the market by 1947, when Peter Adolph started his Subbuteo Sports Games Ltd company. The Newfooty set contained 22 playing figures on a plastic base with lead at the bottom, goalkeepers, balls, wire-made goals, fixture card and rule book. Corner kick flags came later. All fitted into cardboard boxes designed to attract the football fan.

Newfooty advertised itself as "the Original Game" in printed media and was a market rival to Subbuteo in the 1950s. Both companies manufactured sets (in cardboard boxes) of games which looked rather similar in respect of the size of the figures and the methods of play.

In 1960 Newfooty brought the first 3D plastic figurines to the market. The manufactured products are not used in the modern game, but it is loved by many hobby players and collectors.

Newfooty Limited company was taken over by its rival Subbuteo Sports Games Ltd from Tunbridge Wells in 1964 as Newfooty went into liquidation in 1961 however W. Keeling relaunched as Crestlin games & produced a 1963/64 catalogue then went bankrupt again at that point . All history details re Newfooty are documented on Peter Upton's Subbuteo website with full evidence of its existence catalogued from 1929 to its final year of 1963 liquidation

== Competitive play ==
The 'Newfooty Players Association' (NPA) was founded in 1934 in England and people could become members to participate in leagues and cup competitions. It was the world's first "players association" and organised by Newfooty Ltd. There was also a "Newfooty Player of the Year" trophy. The Newfooty handbook "Libro Oficial" was also available in the Spanish language with "Instrucciones y Reglamentos" for "Futbol de Mesa".

The world governing body FISTF issues the modern sports table football rules, based on the classic Subbuteo playing rules. Newfooty rules and regulations are not well-known, except the way to flick the figure towards the ball by flicking the finger.
