= Sports table football =

Tabletop football as a competitive sport

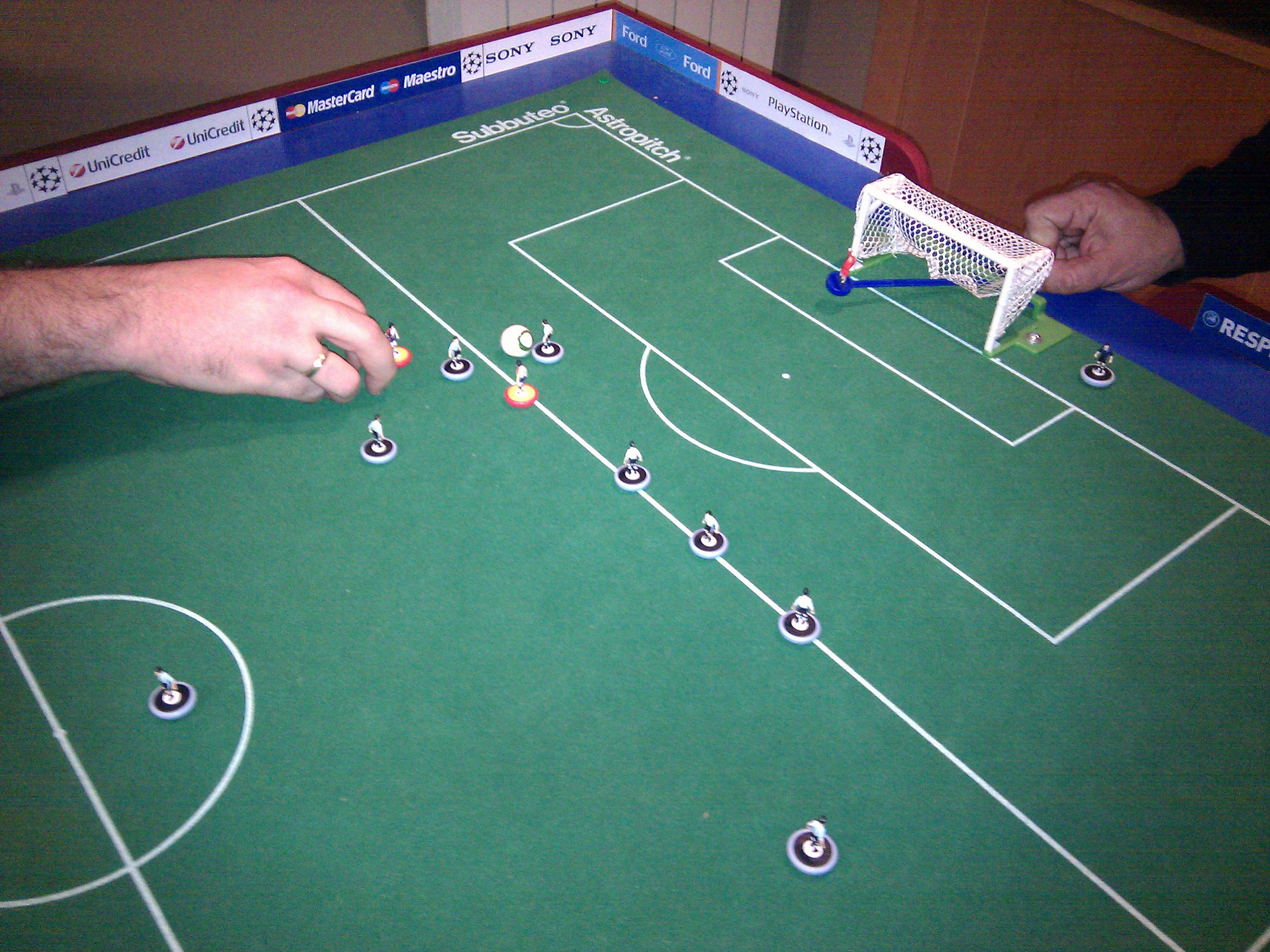
- Two sports table football players
- Publishers: FISTF (Since 1992)
- Years active: 1960–present
- Players: 4 per playing team, 6 per squad
- Setup time: 2–3 minutes
- Playing time: 2x 15-minute periods; 1x 10-minute extra-time period
- Chance: Low
- Skills: Dexterity, tactics, accuracy, concentration

Sports table football is a competitive form of tabletop football which simulates association football. Since 1992, the sport has been governed worldwide by the Federation of International Sports Table Football (FISTF). Informal play of such games date back to Newfooty Company in 1929, with Subbuteo Sports Games introducing the style of figure used in modern sports table football in 1947.

== FISTF ==
International Sports Table Football (Fédération Internationale de Sport Football de Table) (FISTF)) (FISTF) was founded on 16 June 1992 in Hamburg (Germany).

Merging:

- European Tablesoccer (Football) Federation (ETF 1963–1993)
- Federation of International Subbuteo Associations (FISA 1979–1996).
- European Tablesoccer Federation (ETF)
- Federation of International Subbuteo Associations (FISA)

FISTF lays down the playing rules of Table Football.

These are based on the original

Subbuteo (Subbuteo Sports Games (SSG), FISA)

FISTF was registered in Paris, as a governing world body.

== Members ==
Nations:

38 Nations in November 2024.

=== Confederation of Africa (2) ===
TUN RSA

=== Confederation of America North (2) ===
CAN USA

=== Confederation of America South (3) ===
ARG BRA CHL

=== Confederation of Asia (4) ===
AUS SGP JPN NZL

=== Confederation of Europe (27) ===
AUT DEN BEL ENG CYP FIN CZE FRA GER IRL GRE ITA GIB MLT HUN NIR NED ROM NOR SRB POR SCO RUS ESP SUI WAL UKR

== Rules ==
Sports table football rules, based on the 1950s Subbuteo, 1960s ETF (European Table Soccer Federation), and 1970s FISA (Federation of International Subbuteo Associations) rules, are administered by FISTF. Significant changes were made in 1992, when FISTF became the World Federation. The principle rules reflect all aspects of association football that can be simulated by flicking the figures (model footballers fixed on a rounded base) with the index or middle finger to play the plastic ball.

Many FIFA football playing rules are observed. Referees observe the FISTF rules for offside, confirming a goal, fouls, corner kicks, free kicks and throw-ins. When the attacking (offensive) player touches the ball with his figure, then play proceeds and the attacker can make his next as long as his figures touch the ball according to the rules. The defender (defensive) is allowed to play a defensive flick for each single offensive flick, to mark the ball or an attacking figure. The defensive player is therefore active in the game and can, with good defensive flicks, prevent a goal. The best defensive flicks are between the attacking figure and the ball. This prevents the attacker from flicking the ball directly and he then has to choose a different attacking figure for play. As in association football the ball is passed from figure to figure, using the fingernail flicking the figures to play (pass) the ball forward. Tactical understanding of football rules can provide an advantage.

The goalkeeper is on a rod with a handle and controlled from the back of the goal (complete with net), so that a goal shot can be saved with a fast reaction. Shots on goal may be low or high, but must be under the crossbar and in-between the sidebars to score. The ball must be completely inside the shooting area for a score to be classed as a valid goal. The goalkeeper may deflect the ball to a corner kick, throw-in or back into the playing area.

An offside may be forced by flicking a defensive figure away from the goal line, and the attacking player may call "tick" to indicate that he will flick his offside figure back onside (two defending figures between attacking figure and the goal line are necessary). The defender then flicks, and play resumes. The offside rule is the same as in football.

The only major difference between sports table football and real football is the shooting zone in front of each goal. The ball must enter the shooting zone to be able to score a legal goal. The pitch is divided into four equal quarters, normally 300 millimetres (12 in) each, but dimensions may vary (FISTF playing rules). When the entire ball crosses the shooting zone line, the attacking player may take a shot at the goal. The defending player tries to keep the ball out of the shooting area with his defending flicks, blocking the figure or the ball. The ball may be flicked (played) up to three consecutive times with the same figure before another figure must play the ball. This style of passing rule promotes the tactical aspects of the game much like in real football.

== Referees ==
The referees for a tournament are drawn from the pool of players. In the group stage of an event, inactive players are nominated to referee games. In the knockout stage, players eliminated from the group stage are nominated as referees. Referees are usually placed outside of their own qualifying group and away from teammates (club or national) or compatriots where possible. In familiar surroundings such as a club or in regions where sportsmanship is highly regarded, a referee is considered unnecessary for a match or practice match. In this case, and if both players agree, then no referee is necessary. Fair play is a major characteristic of the worldwide community.

== Playing equipment ==
FISTF homologates (i.e.: authorizes the use of) certain playing equipment in international and official competition events. Playing figures on bases, pitches (cotton or artificial cloth simulating grass), goals and balls must all comply with standards and measurements and must be officially homologated by the FISTF Board. Subbuteo-brand equipment can be used, but many higher-level players prefer to use sturdier and more-expensive equipment manufactured by specialist companies, such as Astrobase, Zeugo, Extreme Works, Superfootym and Tchaa4.

Training equipment is available for practicing. Measuring tools are used to verify technical data of playing equipment, such as the base, figure, goalkeeper, and ball.

== Competitions ==
FISTF-sanctioned competitions are held in many of its member nations, featuring individual competitors divided into a variety of categories by age group and gender (open, veteran, U-19, U-15, U-12 and ladies) and competitions for teams (open, veteran, U-19, U-15, U-12 and ladies).

=== World Cup ===
All these categories are played during a World Cup Championship Weekend each year.

A team (squad) consists of six players on the protocol of play, with the team coach (or captain) selecting four to compete on the four playing tables. Of the two reserve players, one may be exchanged during half-time, or in case of injury or for tactical reasons. The FISTF World championship is held annually, in a member country acting as the host nation. The first FISTF Championship (at the time a European event) was held in Verviers, Belgium in 1993. The 2017 World Cup – marking the 25th anniversary of FISTF and 70th anniversary of the Subbuteo trademark – was held at the Palais des Sports in Elancourt, France in October 2017. The forthcoming editions are in even years from 2020, 2022 and 2024 and so forth, while in the odd years the Confederation Championships of Cups will be held. The 2018 World Cup was held in Gibraltar on 1 and 2 September 2018.

=== Europa Cup, Champions League, and Europa League ===
The FISTF Champions League (18th edition including the Europa Cup, hosted by TFC Matterburg from Austria) and the Europa League (host Lazio Rom TSC, Italy) were played for the first time in 2010. The FISTF Champions League (19th edition) and the Europa League 2011 (2nd edition) were hosted by Gruppo Calcio de Tavolo GLF Gorizia from Italy, which was played for the first time on Slovenian territory in 2011. These two events took place 22–23 October 2011 (19th edition). The FISTF Champions and Europa League 2014 were hosted in Frameries, Belgium. The 2016 (24th edition) were in Rome, Italy. Rochefort, Belgium hosted the 25th edition in 2017. Spain was announced as the host for the 2018 Champions League and the Italy will host the Europe League.

=== International tournaments ===
There are several Major, Grand Prix, International Open, Challenger, and Satellite tournaments around the world. National championships are organized by the national domestic associations, such as individual and team competitions with promotion and relegation systems. Cup competitions (knock-out) are also played in several individual and team categories. There are also international competitions between nations, and three-country tournaments are often played such as Belgium–Netherlands–Germany, Austria–Switzerland–Germany, or the British Championship (England–Scotland–Wales–Northern Ireland). To date the biggest four-country tournament was in 1985 between England, Scotland, Wales and Austria. Every player in such tournaments has a chance to be nominated for international matches (caps) for his country.

In 2011 the World Amateur Subbuteo Players Association (WASPA) started to promote the game worldwide. Though initially felt to be competing with FISTF, by 2014 the two organizations were cooperating – WASPA bringing together smaller gatherings, while FSITF organized strict sporting events. WASPA tournaments are easier to organize for smaller clubs or nations. The played games (results) are added to a WASPA World ranking list. Every FISTF member or non-member country can organize WASPA tournaments and send results to the WASPA ranking list. This helps promote the sport in countries where it is emerging and is the primary way to begin a club or association, to build and develop a player base for the growth of the sport.

FISTF and WASPA have a synergy effect on the sport, and for manufacturers of its playing equipment.

== Competition formats ==
=== League competition format ===
The league competition format is the traditional championship as in seen in football (FIFA). The round-robin tournament system is used and the participants (individual or teams) play each other in the league two times within one season, normally as one home and one away match. Many leagues play each other four times during a season. Depending on the domestic league system the last positioned teams or players in the league table are relegated to the second tier (if there are sufficient teams for such). The second tier champions are normally promoted to the first tier. Each FISTF member or non-member country has its own way to determine its champions.

=== Cup competition format ===
The cup competition format is the traditional knock-out tournament single-elimination tournament as in seen in association football (FIFA). The participants (individual or teams) are drawn from a pot against another opponent. The winners from the first round (32) proceed to the second round (16), quarter-final (8), semi-final (4) of the event, until the two finalists face each other in a grand final. Sometimes the losers are drawn in a round of last 16, to play a consolation event, until all positions are played in finals (3/4, 5/6,...17/18,...31/32 and so forth. In such a way, a player is warranted 5 games, if 32 players take part in a cup knock-out competition.

=== International tournament competition format ===
The international tournament competition format is a mixture of the league and cup formats, used for the FISTF World Cup, Champions and Europa Leagues, Majors (MJ), Grand Prix (GP), International Open (IO), Satellite (SAT), and Challenger (CHA) tournaments. The first rounds are compiled by groups of 3, 4 or 5 players in league system and the second stage is then a knock-out system.

=== Swiss-system competition format ===
The Swiss-system tournament was introduced to table football from the world of chess in 1976 by Michael Dent. The concept was devised to provide a fair number of matches for competitors who may otherwise travel a long way, only to be beaten in the 1st round of a knock-out tournament. Players are seeded (according to existing ranking lists) and drawn in the first round. In the second round, players with equal points (League table) are drawn against each other. This is repeated in rounds three and four. Goal difference is not a determining factor, in order to prevent discouraging younger or newer players from suffering heavy defeats. The advantage of the Swiss system is that players find their own level and have better chances of at least winning one game. The downside is that the number of matches required may not result in a clear winner. This can be obviated by an optional final play-off round or final match. It is recommended to have an equal number of players. The league table needs to be calculated precisely after each round.

== Historical playing rules ==
The first playing rules were published in 1929 from Newfooty. The playing Rules from Subbuteo Sports Games Ltd. were published in 1947. The ETF playing rules were published in 1960/61, before the first edition of the Europa Cup in Rotterdam. The FISA playing rules were published in 1978, which derived from the original Subbuteo playing rules. The FISTF playing rules were published in 1992/1993, before the European Championships in Belgium. Several modifications have been introduced in the interest of sportsmanship and a realistic football simulation.

The line defence (7 figures or more) was introduced to the game by Michael Dent in the early 1970s when he moved from Scotland to England and joined the English Table Soccer League (Division 2). Prior to that date Subbuteo rules mandated a 'FIFA approved' formation, e.g. 4-2-4, 3-5-2, 4-4-2 etc. (see Scottish TSA Newsletter No.10, p3, November 1972)
