= House of Cards (Madina Lake song) =

Single by Madina Lake

from the album From Them, Through Us, to You
- Released: 2007
- Recorded: 2006
- Genre: Alternative rock, post-hardcore
- Length: 3:36
- Label: Roadrunner
- Songwriters: Matthew J. Leone, Daniel David Torelli, Nathan D. Leone, Mateo Camargo

Madina Lake singles chronology
"House of Cards" (2007)	"Here I Stand" (2007)

"House of Cards" is a song by Chicago-based rock band Madina Lake and is the fourth track on their debut album From Them, Through Us, To You, released in March 2007. It was also featured on the bands EP, The Disappearance of Adalia. It briefly charted on the Billboard Hot Modern Rock Tracks chart, peaking at number 38.

== Track listing ==
1. "House of Cards"
2. "True Love"
3. "We'll Be Okay"
4. "House of Cards" (Live)

== Music video ==
The video was directed by Nicolas Hill and produced by Mark Marinaccio.

The music video for the song shows the band performing the song inside and outside of a house, as well as a story involving a man (portrayed by vocalist Nathan Leone) and his girlfriend walking around the house seeing strange occurrences involving each other. Towards the end, Nathan leaves the house and starts hammering wood in a small room whilst also holding his head and swaying back and forth as if he is in pain, and the video ends with Nathan curled up in a corner in a dark wooden room in despair.
