= Jeff Stone (author) =

American author

- Education: Michigan State University
- Writing career
- Language: English
- Website: readjeffstone.com

Jeff Stone is an American author, best known for a series of Kung Fu themed books for teens called The Five Ancestors, published by Random House.

== Biography ==
Jeff Stone grew up in Detroit, Michigan, and currently lives in Indiana. Stone is married and has two kids, a son and a daughter. Stone was adopted as an infant. Stone holds a black belt in Shaolin Do Kung Fu. Stone graduated from Michigan State University with degrees in English and Journalism.

== Works ==
=== The Five Ancestors series ===
- Tiger (2003)
- Monkey (2003)
- Snake (2005)
- Crane (2008)
- Eagle (2008)
- Mouse (2009) (titled Mantis in the U.K. and Australia)
- Dragon (2010)

=== The Five Ancestors: Out of the Ashes series ===
- Phoenix (2012)
- Lion (2013)
- Jackal (2014)
