= Hokey cokey (disambiguation) =

The Hokey Cokey (UK) or Hokey Pokey (North America) is an old British nursery rhyme and folk song.

Hokey cokey or hokey pokey may also refer to:

== Dance and music ==
- Jingle Bells/Hokey Cokey, a 1978 single released by British reggae singer Judge Dread
- The Hokey Cokey, a 1981 single by British band The Snowmen
- The Hokey Cokey, a 1985 single released by British band Black Lace
- Hokey Pokey (album), an album by British artists Richard and Linda Thompson released in 1975, featuring Hokey Pokey (the ice cream song)
- Do The Hokey Pokey (dance), written by Larry LaPrise, Charles Macak and Taftt Baker.
- Hokey Pokey Records, a record label

== Food ==
- Hokey pokey (ice cream), an iconic New Zealand flavour of ice cream
- Ice cream sold by street vendors, a precursor to ice cream sandwiches.
- Hokey pokey, a New Zealand term for honeycomb toffee

== See also ==
- Hokey (disambiguation)
