= Attics to Eden =

Studio album by Madina Lake
- Released: May 1, 2009
- Genre: Alternative rock; pop-punk; post-hardcore; emo
- Length: 37:17
- Label: Roadrunner
- Producer: David Bendeth

Madina Lake chronology
From Them, Through Us, to You (2007)	Attics to Eden (2009)	The Dresden Codex (2010)

Singles from Attics to Eden
- 1. "Never Take Us Alive" Released: February 2009; 2. "Let's Get Outta Here" Released: August 3, 2009; 3. "Welcome to Oblivion" Released: November 15, 2009

Professional ratings
Review scores
Source	Rating
AllMusic	2.5/5 stars
Alternative Press	3/5 stars
Kerrang!	4/5 stars
Q	4/5 stars
Rock Sound	8/10 stars

Attics to Eden is the second studio album by American band Madina Lake. It was released on 1 May 2009 in Australia, 4 May in the UK and 5 May 2009 in the United States. The track listing was announced in January 2009 by the British music magazine, Kerrang.

Musically, it is much different from the band's debut album From Them, Through Us, to You. The booklet folds out to a map showing Madina Lake's fictional character, Adalia's, journey to Eden.

The album debuted and peaked at #44 on the UK Albums Chart.

== Track listing ==
All tracks are written by Madina Lake, except where noted.

No.	Title	Length
1.	"Never Take Us Alive" (David Bendeth, Madina Lake)	3:00
2.	"Let's Get Outta Here"	2:59
3.	"Legends"	3:00
4.	"Criminals"	3:57
5.	"Through the Pain"	3:27
6.	"Never Walk Alone"	2:42
7.	"Not for This World"	3:12
8.	"Welcome to Oblivion"	3:03
9.	"Silent Voices Kill"	2:53
10.	"Statistics""	3:02
11.	"Friends & Lovers"	3:49
12.	"Lila, the Divine Game"	2:20
Total length:		37:17

Digital bonus tracks

No.	Title	Length
13.	"Never Take Us Alive (From the Attic mix)"	3:28
14.	"What's the Point"	2:33
15.	"Scorched Earth"	3:03

Japan bonus track

No.	Title	Length
13.	"Angel" (Bendeth, Madina Lake)	3:22

== Personnel ==
- Nathan Leone – lead vocals
- Mateo Camargo – guitar, keyboards, synthesizers, programming, backing vocals
- Matthew Leone – bass guitar, backing vocals
- Dan Torelli – drums, percussion

== Release history ==
Country	Date
Australia	May 1, 2009
United Kingdom	May 4, 2009
United States	May 5, 2009

== "Never Take Us Alive" ==
The first single "Never Take Us Alive" is available on iTunes as well as other digital music retailers. Frontman Nathan Leone explained to Kerrang! that "Never Take Us Alive" is about, "overcoming the negativity, ignoring it and continuing the pursuit of your own happiness." The video was first aired on the online MySpaceTV, and has since found its way to YouTube. This song is included in the soundtrack of the game Colin McRae: Dirt 2.

== "Welcome to Oblivion" ==
Their third single off the album is "Welcome to Oblivion", as announced in their blog on their website. The video was shot the weekend of September 11, 2009 and has been released in the UK prior to being released in the United States.
