= The Dresden Codex (EP) =

EP by Madina Lake
- Released: December 10, 2010
- Recorded: 2010
- Genre: Alternative rock
- Label: Self-released

Madina Lake chronology
| Attics to Eden (2009) | The Dresden Codex (2010) | World War III (2011) |

The Dresden Codex is the second EP by alternative rock band Madina Lake and follow-up to their second studio album Attics to Eden from 2009. The release was self-produced after announcing that they had left their label, Roadrunner Records in April 2010. They subsequently set up an account on the website Pledgemusic to help fund the EP, which is sold to fans who have pledged as well as donating a percentage of the money raised to the Keep A Breast Foundation. On September 1, 2010, the band released "They're Coming for Me" to iTunes, after being recorded days before bassist Matthew Leone was attacked. The full EP was released on December 10, 2010, for download on Pledgemusic.

== Track listing ==
| No. | Title | Length |
|---|---|---|
| 1. | "Hey Superstar" | 3:08 |
| 2. | "Heroine" | 2:45 |
| 3. | "They're Coming for Me" | 3:12 |
| 4. | "Let It Go" (Acoustic) | 4:08 |
| 5. | "A Beautiful Life (The song "A Beautiful Life" ends at 3:00. The hidden track "A Rite of Passage" begins at 7:40)." | 13:41 |
| Total length: | | 26:14 |

== Notes ==
- "Let It Go" is listed as an acoustic track as according to a picture of the track listing taken by the band and is a new originally acoustic composition.
- The title to track 5 "A Beautiful Life" is similar to the English translation for the title of the Italian film La Dolce Vita which translates to "the sweet life" or "the good life". The band's fictional character Adalia is supposedly based on a character from La Dolce Vita.
- The tracks "Hey Superstar", "They're Coming for Me" and "Heroine" went on to be featured on Madina Lake's third album World War III. "A Beautiful Life" would be included as a bonus track on the Japanese version of World War III.
