= Propter hoc =

Propter hoc may refer to:

- Cum hoc ergo propter hoc (Latin: "with this, therefore because of this"), an informal fallacy suggesting that when two events happen together, one must cause the other
- Post hoc ergo propter hoc (Latin: "after this, therefore because of this"), an informal fallacy suggesting that when an event follows another event, the earlier event caused the later one
- "Post Hoc, Ergo Propter Hoc" (The West Wing), an episode of the television series The West Wing

== See also ==
- Post hoc (disambiguation)
