= Post hoc =

Post hoc (sometimes written as post-hoc) is a Latin phrase, meaning "after this" or "after the event".

Post hoc may refer to:

- Post hoc analysis or post hoc test, statistical analyses that were not specified before the data were seen
- Post hoc theorizing, generating hypotheses based on data already observed
- Post hoc ergo propter hoc (after this, therefore because of this), a logical fallacy of causation
- "Post Hoc, Ergo Propter Hoc" (The West Wing), an episode of the television series The West Wing

== See also ==
- Propter hoc (disambiguation)
- A priori and a posteriori, Latin phrases used in philosophy meaning "from earlier" and "from later"
- Ex post, Latin phrase meaning "after the event"
- Ad hoc, a solution designed for a specific problem or task, Latin meaning "for this"
