= Hokey =

Hokey means corny, mawkishly sentimental, or obviously contrived.

Hokey can also refer to:

== Arts, entertainment, and media ==
- Hokey cokey (AKA hokey pokey), a participation dance
- Hokey Wolf, a Hanna-Barbera cartoon character

== Other uses ==
- Hokey, Handover Keying technologies addressing seamless migration of secure wireless connections from one network to another
- Hokey, misspelling of Hokie, the mascot of Virginia Tech

== See also ==
- Hokey pokey (disambiguation)
