= World War III (Madina Lake album) =

Studio album by Madina Lake
- Released: September 13, 2011
- Genres: Post-hardcore; pop-punk; alternative rock; pop rock
- Length: 43:46; 49:48 (Bonus Tracks)
- Label: Razor & Tie
- Producers: Mateo Camargo; Billy Corgan (track "Imagineer")

Madina Lake chronology
The Dresden Codex (2010)	World War III (2011)	The Beginning of New Endings (2020)

Singles from World War III
- 1. "Hey Superstar" Released: 3 October 2011; 2. "Imagineer" Released: 2011; 3. "Fireworks" Released: January 1, 2012; 4. "Howdy Neighbor!" Released: March 2012; 5. "Across 5 Oceans" Released: 2012

World War III is the third studio album by American post-hardcore band Madina Lake, released on September 13, 2011. The first single from the album is "Hey Superstar", and the second one is "Imagineer" produced by Billy Corgan. This is their first album after leaving Roadrunner Records and signing with Razor & Tie. It was also their last album with founding drummer Dan Torelli, who did not rejoin the band upon their reformation in 2017.

== Track listing ==
All tracks are written by Madina Lake, except where noted.

No.	Title	Length
1.	"Howdy Neighbor!"	3:43
2.	"Imagineer" (Billy Corgan, Madina Lake)	3:55
3.	"They're Coming for Me"	3:12
4.	"Hey Superstar"	3:09
5.	"Fireworks"	2:44
6.	"Across 5 Oceans"	3:27
7.	"We Got This"	3:04
8.	"What It Is to Wonder"	3:15
9.	"Heroine"	2:44
10.	"Blood Red Flags"	2:48
11.	"Take Me or Leave"	3:30
12.	"The Great Divide"	8:47
Total length:		43:46

iTunes Deluxe Edition Bonus tracks
No.	Title	Length
13.	"Jimmy"	3:19
14.	"Goin Down High"	2:43
Total length:		49:48

Japanese Edition Bonus track
No.	Title	Length
13.	"A Beautiful Life ( from their previous EP The Dresden Codex )"	2:57
Total length:		46:43

== Notes ==
- "Across 5 Oceans" and "Hey Superstar" were used as downloadable tracks in Guitar Hero: Warriors of Rock.
- "Hey Superstar" was their first single and it was released on October 3, 2011, but was used as the theme song for TNA Wrestling's Genesis event in January.
- Four music videos were released, "Hey Superstar" on August 30, 2011, "Imagineer" on September 13, 2011, "Across 5 Ocean" right before starting "Lila, The Divine Game" tour on September 27, 2012, and "They're Coming For Me" during hiatus between it and Farewell tour in 2013.

== Critical reception ==
Professional ratings
Review scores
Source	Rating
AllMusic	3.5/5 stars
IGN	9/10 stars
Kerrang!	4/5 stars
LMP Magazine	9/10 stars
Melodic.net	4/5 stars
Mind Equals Brown	3/5 stars
Musiqtone.com	5/5 stars
Rock Sound	7/10 stars
Thrash Hits	4/6 stars
Rockfreaks.net	6/10 stars
Under The Gun Review	7/10

The album received positive reviews upon its release. From IGN's 90% rating to Rock Sound's 70%, the album has been well received. Chad Grischow of IGN said "Regardless of whether you have followed the tale from the start or this is your first taste of Madina Lake, World War III proves to be a satisfying conclusion to the tale and stands up well on its own as simply a great rock album." Kerrang! rated the album 4 Ks out of 5 and stated that "There is much to like about World War III, both in terms of its energy and its exuberant and determined quality."

== Personnel ==
Madina Lake

- Nathan Leone – lead vocals
- Mateo Camargo – guitar, backing vocals
- Matthew Leone – bass guitar, backing vocals
- Dan Torelli – drums, percussion, backing vocals

Production

- Mateo Camargo - production, mixing, engineering
- Billy Corgan – production on "Imagineer"
- Chris Lord-Alge - Mixing
- John Naclerio - Mastering

Guest Vocals

- Dave Casey - "Take Me Or Leave"
- Maria Jose Camargo - "Heroine", "They're Coming For Me" and "What It Is To Wonder"

== Release history ==
Country	Date
United States	September 13, 2011
Japan	September 14, 2011
Australia	September 16, 2011
United Kingdom	October 10, 2011
