= From Them, Through Us, to You =

Studio album by Madina Lake
- Released: March 26, 2007
- Genre: Post-hardcore; pop-punk; alternative rock; emo; screamo
- Length: 48:44
- Label: Roadrunner
- Producer: Mark Trombino

Madina Lake chronology
The Disappearance of Adalia (2006)	From Them, Through Us, to You (2007)	Attics to Eden (2009)

Singles from From Them, Through Us, to You
- 1. "House of Cards" Released: 2007; 2. "Here I Stand" Released: 2007; 3. "One Last Kiss" Released: 2007; 4. "Pandora" Released: 2008

From Them, Through Us, to You is the debut album by Chicago-based rock band Madina Lake. The album was released in the United States on March 27, 2007, via Roadrunner Records; it was released a day earlier in the UK.

The album debuted at number 154 on the US Billboard 200 albums chart, number three on the Billboard Top Heatseekers chart, and number 60 on the UK Albums Chart.

The first single off the album was "House of Cards", followed by "Here I Stand", "One Last Kiss" and "Pandora", all of which have music videos.

== Reception ==
Professional ratings
Review scores
Source	Rating
AbsolutePunk	77%
AllMusic	3/5 stars
Kerrang!	4/5
Metal Hammer	7/10 stars
MusicOMH	4/5 stars
Sputnikmusic	2.5/5

AllMusic stated that "The in-your-face intensity on tracks like the opening anthemic rocker "Here I Stand" is balanced by a tight sense of vocal harmony and an infectious melodicism that prevails most of the way through. It juxtaposes harsh background vocals with a heavy grooving drumbeat. If you like your music loud, take a dip in Madina Lake, bang your head and have a blast!" Sputnikmusic felt that "On paper, it reads just like a form of angst-filled high school poetry and with Nathan's nasally voice screeching and defecating the lyrics, it just makes it all that worse. This had the potential to be a great album but falls short by quite a margin."

MusicOMH said: "It's an album beset with clunking visuals and broader-than-thou riffs, complementing twin brother Nathan's expansive, excessive vocals tenfold to a beating post-hardcore centre." AbsolutePunk.net wrote: "From Them, Through Us, to You is an album that offers a glimpse into the nature of Madina Lake, people, and society and places them to hard rock music laced with electronica and pop undertones. This blend of melody and aggression is the same kind that has launched the band's peers onto the fast track of success, and may very well do the same for Madina Lake."

== Track listing ==
From Them, Through Us, to You track listing
No.	Title	Length
1.	"The Auspice"	2:00
2.	"Here I Stand"	3:23
3.	"In Another Life"	3:11
4.	"Adalia"	2:31
5.	"House of Cards"	3:36
6.	"Now or Never" (3:23 on advanced version)	4:11
7.	"Pandora"	3:24
8.	"Stars"	3:59
9.	"River People"	4:27
10.	"One Last Kiss"	3:27
11.	"Me vs. the World"	3:08
12.	"Morning Sadness" (3:46 on advanced version)	5:22
13.	"True Love" (3:56 on advanced version)	6:02
Total length:		48:44

- The retail version of "Morning Sadness" includes audio of a female voice speaking in the outro which is assumed to be the fictional main character of the album Adalia.

Bonus tracks
No.	Title	Length
1.	"Again and Again"	3:15
2.	"We'll Be Okay"	2:52
3.	"Today" (Smashing Pumpkins cover)	3:21
4.	"Escape from Here" (from The Disappearance of Adalia EP)	3:33
5.	"Here I Stand" (acoustic)

For unknown reasons, the iTunes release includes the whole advanced track listing with "The Auspice" but "Now or Never", "Morning Sadness" and "True Love" are omitted with the advanced version lengths not the retail lengths. The iTunes version also indicates three segues in the subtitles of two songs ("Pandora" and "True Love"; "True Love" has two segues) but the tracks appear the same as in the advanced version.

The song "Again and Again" was available for free download on the band's website shortly after the release of the album through a Flash-based game that tied into the fictional story of Madina Lake.

== Charts ==
Chart performance for From Them, Through Us, to You
Chart (2007)	Peak position
Scottish Albums (OCC)	65
UK Albums (OCC)	60
UK Rock & Metal Albums (OCC)	5
US Billboard 200	154
