= The Disappearance of Adalia =

EP by Madina Lake
- Released: October 3, 2006
- Recorded: 2006
- Genre: Alternative rock
- Length: 17:29
- Label: Self-released
- Producer: Mark Trombino

Madina Lake chronology
The Disappearance of Adalia (2006)	From Them, Through Us, to You (2007)

The Disappearance of Adalia is the first release from Madina Lake self-released on October 3, 2006. It garnered the attention of Roadrunner Records which ultimately led to their signing to the label. Songs "One Last Kiss", "Here I Stand" and "Adalia" were re-recorded for their debut album "From Them, Through Us, to You" released in 2007. The song "Pecadillos" is also Madina Lake's first released instrumental song.

== Track listing ==
1. "House of Cards" (3:38)

2. "One Last Kiss" (3:43)

3. "Here I Stand" (3:17)

4. "Adalia" (2:29)

5. "Escape from Here" (3:33)

6. "Pecadillos" (0:49)
