= The Five Ancestors =

Book series by Jeff Stone

The Five Ancestors is a young adult book series written by American author Jeff Stone about five young Chinese warrior monks who are the only survivors of the destruction and raid of their home, Cangzhen Temple. Each of the warriors specializes in an animal kung fu and possesses a Cantonese animal name: Fu (Tiger), Malao (Monkey), Seh (Snake), Hok (Crane), Long (Dragon), and Ying (Eagle). When Grandmaster is killed by their former brother Ying (Eagle), the warriors must seek their past and change Ying and the Emperor's heart. Each monk will begin to uncover their own past and learn surprising facts about themselves. The seven books in the series are: Tiger, Monkey, Snake, Crane, Eagle, Mouse, and Dragon; published by Random House between 2003-2010.

== Books ==
=== Tiger (2005) ===
Tiger was published March 22, 2005.

In the novel, 12-year-old Fu and his temple brothers Malao, Seh, Hok, and Long don’t know who their parents were. Raised from infancy by their grandmaster, they think of their temple as their home and their fellow warrior monks as their family. However, one terrible night, the temple is destroyed by an army led by a former monk named Ying, whose heart is bent on revenge. Fu and his brothers are the only survivors. Charged by their grandmaster to uncover the secrets of their past, the five flee into the countryside and go their separate ways. Somehow, Grandmaster has promised, their pasts are connected to Ying’s. Understanding that the past is the key to shaping the future, the first book in the series follows Fu as he struggles to find out more and prove himself in the process. Fu’s name literally means "tiger," for he is the youngest-ever master of the fierce fighting style modeled after that animal.

=== Monkey (2005) ===
Monkey was published September 27, 2005. Young Adult Library Services Association included Monkey on their list of 2008 Quick Picks for Reluctant Young Adult Readers.

At 11-years-old, Malao is the youngest of the Five Ancestors. He, like his brothers Fu, Seh, Hok, and Long, is an orphan and considers Cangzhen (Hidden Truth) to be his one and only home. However, with his home destroyed and Grandmaster killed by his former brother Ying, Malao is forced to fend for himself. Tasked with uncovering his past and finding a way to change the Emperor of China, Malao must make a journey to unknown realms of the world with a mysterious new friend that he meets along the way.

=== Snake (2006) ===
Snake was published March 14, 2006.

In the novel, 12-year-old Seh is a snake-style master and a keeper of secrets. Close-lipped and ever-watchful, he has used his highly attuned senses to collect information about his brothers, his temple, and even Grandmaster. Now, with the temple and Grandmaster gone, Seh sheds his orange robe like an old skin, joins a bandit gang, and meets a mysterious man whose name means Python—all the while trying to stay one step ahead of vengeful Ying.

=== Crane (2007) ===
Hok, a crane-style Kung Fu master, is also a master at hiding. For the past 12 years, she has hidden the fact that she is a girl. Now her rogue brother, Ying, and his army have placed a huge price on her head. Fortunately, she manages to make it to Kaifeng where she finds her mother and a "round-eye" with the very funny name of Charles. Together Hok and Charles start to make some sense of the magnitude of Ying's plans.

=== Eagle (2008) ===
For years, Ying hated his grandmaster for denying him the opportunity to train as a Dragon, and held a deep resentment for his five younger brothers–grandmaster's favorites. He took his revenge and burnt the Cangzhen temple to the ground, but the five youngsters survived and continue to be a thorn in his side. Yet, when betrayed by the emperor and imprisoned, it was his younger sister, Hok, who rescued him. Now Ying begins to realize that Tonglong has been manipulating him for a long time.

=== Mouse (2009) ===
Little street urchin ShaoShu has always wanted to belong. His small size makes him an easy target for bullies and baddies and this little "mouse" always needs a place to hide. When he is befriended by Hok and Ying, he thinks he has found a new family, and eagerly tags along as they continue on their travels. What he doesn't know is that his new friends are the most wanted criminals in China, and their adventures will land him in the middle of a battle not only for their lives, but for the future of China itself.

=== Dragon (2010) ===
Long, the dragon-style warrior, saw his temple burned, his brothers killed, and his novice siblings fleeing to the four winds. But that was many months ago. Now the five young warriors have reunited with Ying, the redeemed renegade who put all of these events in motion, and ShaoShu, the mousy street thief, to prevent the witty mantis Tonglong from taking over China. It's a race to the forbidden City. The winner will rule China.

=== Phoenix (2012) ===
Phoenix was published September 25, 2012.

== Character name translation ==
Tiger- Fu
Monkey- Malao
Snake- Seh
Crane- Hok
Dragon- Long
Golden Dragon~ Gum Long
Eagle- Ying
Mouse- ShaoShu
Praying Mantis- Tonglong
Bear- Hung
Horse- Ma
Deer- Luk
Mountain Tiger- Sanfu
Toad- HaMo
Cobra- AnGangseh
Rat (Mouse)- LaoShu
Leopard- Tsung
Scorpion- Xie
Dog- Gao
Centipede- NgGung
Python- Mong
Pig- Hukjee
Crow- Wuya
Jellyfish- Haizhe
Cloud hand - WanSow
Vengeful Dragon - Saulong
Peaceful - OnYeen
Ice - Bing
Grandma - Paw Paw

== Main characters ==
- Fu: Fu is a master of tiger style kung fu and, at the age of 12 years, the youngest to have ever mastered the style. He is very instinctive, somewhat rash, and has heightened senses of sight and hearing. He is the strongest and burliest of his brothers and has an extremely strong will.
- Malao: 11-year-old Malao is the most playful of the five. He is the youngest master of monkey style kung fu and his personality matches that of a monkey. He can jump from tree to tree or building to building from great distances and his agility and unpredictability are rarely matched by anyone. Malao's feet also possess an extremely pungent odor that often causes his companions distress. Malao is also a fierce warrior
- Seh: 12-year-old Seh is the youngest master of snake style kung fu. He is tricky, cunning, smooth, and often very suspicious. Seh has an unnatural ability to sense other people's chi, as well as mask his own chi from others to keep himself hidden. He meets a beauty snake along the course of his travels, with which he has formed a bond. It usually remains in his sleeve and it seems that it, too, can sense others' chi, like Seh.
- Hok: At 12 years of age, Hok is the youngest master of crane style kung fu. Patient, calm, and tranquil, Hok is a skilled healer and very compassionate person. For this master's entire life, the crane has been hiding a great secret - she is a girl. During her journey, she meets up with a crane. She turns out to be half Dutch and half Chinese. Her mother is Bing and her father is Captain Henrik, who happens to be captain of Charles's crew. Her birth name was OnYeen.
- Long: At 13 years old, Long is the youngest dragon style master. He is very wise, for his age, yet is, also, naive to the world. He rarely appears in the series. Due to his training as a dragon, Long has the physique of a well built 18-year-old and has large amounts of chi that he has trouble masking. He has an extremely sensitive dan tien, or chi center. He appears in Eagle as a fighter.
- Ying: Ying is the 16-year-old eagle master, who is the main antagonist of the series until he is publicly betrayed by Tonglong in "Crane". He left Cangzhen after his best friend Luk died on a mission for the Emperor. After this, he grew his fingernails and toenails to extreme lengths, filed his fingernails, toenails, and teeth to sharp points, forked his tongue, and, finally, carved his face and filled the grooves with green pigment. This makeover was performed so that he could feel and look like the dragon he felt he was meant to be.
- ShaoShu: ShaoShu, or Little Mouse, first appears in Eagle. He is an orphaned thief who used his abilities as a contortionist to get into places no one else could. This helped him survive fairly well on the streets and helped him to help Ying, after the latter escaped from prison.
- Mong: Mong was once a Cangzhen monk. He is a master of the python fighting style. He is Seh's father. He squeezes his enemies to death.
- Sanfu: Sanfu, or Mountain tiger, first appears in Tiger at the village of the governor. He simply goes by "Drunkard". Though his size is very large, he is a master of tiger kung fu, but makes it look like "a drunk tiger". He is also able to use some medical remedies that no one else but Fu could use after he was shot in the leg by one of Ying's soldiers. He is Fu's father and like Mong, he was once a Cangzhen monk. At the end of Dragon, Fu decides to travel with him after their victory celebration.
- Tonglong: Tonglong bases his kung fu on the praying mantis. He used to be Ying's right-hand man until he turns against him in Crane. Tonglong is Seh's half brother, they both share the same mother. Seh realizes his mother isn't loyal to his father and him. Tonglong tricks the Emperor into imprisoning Ying, taking command of all his soldiers. Tonglong came into the Emperor's ranks by being the Grand Champion at the Jinan Fight Club.
- Charles: Charles is a friend of Hok's father and first appears in Crane. The group travel on his sloop often and is eventually destroyed in Dragon.
- AnGangseh: AnGangseh is the mother of Tonglong and Seh. She conceals poison underneath her fingernails and hides in the shadows.
