= Madina Lake =

American alternative rock band

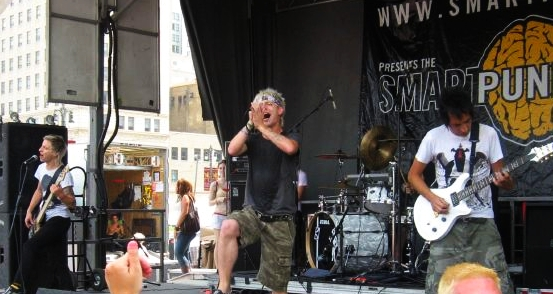
- Madina Lake on Warped Tour 2008 in Detroit, Michigan (July 18, 2008).

Background information
- Origin: Chicago, Illinois, United States
- Genres: Alternative rock; pop-punk; post-hardcore; emo
- Years active: 2005–2013, 2017–present
- Labels: Sony; Razor & Tie; Roadrunner
- Members: Nathan Leone; Matthew Leone; Mateo Camargo; Chris Mason
- Past members: Shawn Currie; Dan Torelli

Madina Lake is an American rock band formed in Chicago, Illinois, United States, in 2005. The band released their debut album, From Them, Through Us, to You, through Roadrunner Records on March 27, 2007. Madina Lake won Best International Newcomer at the Kerrang! Awards 2007. The group disbanded in September 2013 before reuniting in February 2017.

== History ==
=== Formation and The Disappearance of Adalia EP (2005–2006) ===
Nathan and Matthew Leone were first in a band known as the Blank Theory, based in Chicago, Illinois. Drummer Dan Torelli and Mateo Camargo were in a band called Reforma that had relocated to Chicago and both bands shared the same manager and often toured together. Nathan and Matthew Leone befriended Torelli and Camargo, and unhappy with their current situations decided to disband their respective bands, and form Madina Lake. Shawn Currie of The Blank Theory was in the original line up as the band's keyboardist for Madina Lake, but left shortly after the band started working on material causing Camargo to become the band's keyboardist. They played their first show as Madina Lake on May 21, 2005, at Chicago's historic Metro.

Nathan and Matthew Leone first gained nationwide media recognition when they appeared in a special edition of Twin Fear Factor. They won $45,000 – $20,000 from finishing the first stunt the fastest, and $25,000 from finishing one of the two last stunts the fastest – and used it to pay for a recording process and demo of Madina Lake's first self-produced EP entitled The Disappearance of Adalia, which was released on August 22, 2006.

=== From Them, Through Us, to You (2006–2008) ===
After releasing The Disappearance of Adalia, Madina Lake gained a recording contract and signed with Roadrunner Records in April 2006 and created their first full-length album entitled From Them, Through Us, to You, which was released on March 27, 2007. It was produced, engineered and mixed by Mark Trombino. The album debuted at No. 154 on the Billboard 200 album charts, and at No. 60 on the UK album charts.

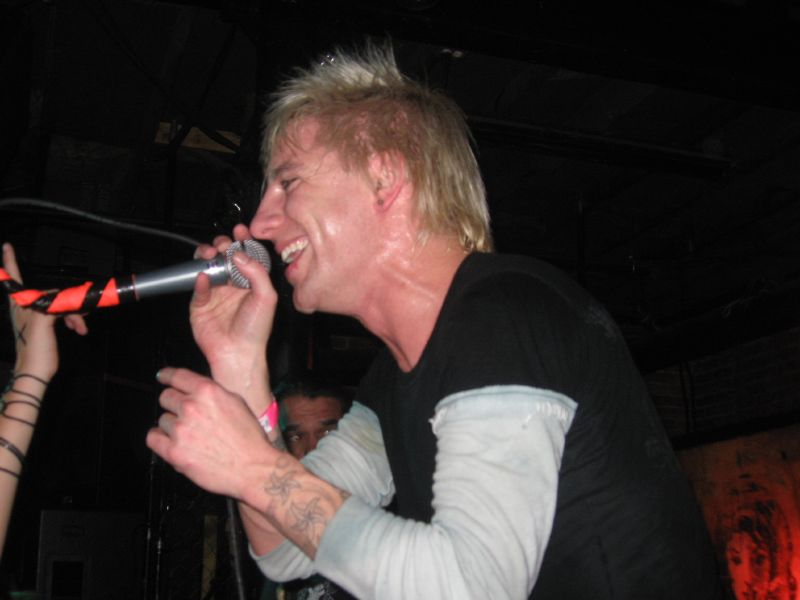
Lead vocalist Nathan Leone on November 18, 2007.

The release of From Them, Through Us, to You was followed up by a headlining tour with Fightstar and participating in the Projekt Revolution tour. At first they had originally planned to play Warped Tour 2007, but dropped out to play on the Revolution Stage when Linkin Park specifically chose them. The band has also toured (at different times) alongside such acts as Story of the Year, Aiden, Halifax, and Mayday Parade, among others.

Between Jan and Feb 2008 they toured the UK playing in the Kerrang tour alongside Fightstar and Coheed and Cambria.

On May 3, 2008, Madina Lake played their third year of The Bamboozle festival in New Jersey and on June 14, 2008, they also played the infamous Download Festival in Donington Park on the Main stage and wrapped up touring From Them, Through Us, to You on Warped Tour 2008 from July 9 to July 25.

A DVD that chronicles the writing and recording process of From Them, Through Us, to You as well as tours and events that followed was scheduled to be released before the end of 2008.

Madina Lake was also given a slot to play in Osaka, Japan at the Summer Sonic Festival 2007. Madina Lake recorded a cover of Caught Somewhere In Time from the Iron Maiden Album Somewhere in Time for a cover CD called Maiden Heaven: A Tribute to Iron Maiden, which was given away with the July 16 issue of Kerrang! magazine.

=== Attics to Eden (2009–2010) ===
Madina Lake recorded their second studio album, and it was produced by David Bendeth and was released on May 5, 2009.

To start off the touring stint for Attics to Eden, Madina Lake supported Anberlin on their Canadian tour. They will also play a show with Emery and Silverstein at the Pipeline Cafe in Honolulu, Hawaii in late February.

Madina Lake are scheduled to play Soundwave festival 2009 from February 21 through March 2. After Soundwave they will be playing three shows in Japan with Less Than Jake.

They are also confirmed to play all dates in the 2009 Vans Warped Tour.

They have also confirmed that "Let's Get Outta Here" will be the second single released from their 2009 second studio album Attics to Eden, they will shoot a video for the song, as confirmed via their website. Madina Lake is doing a few shows with Escape The Fate and A Skylit Drive. To begin the promotional tour for Attics to Eden, Madina Lake supported Anberlin on their Canadian tour. They will also play a show with Emery and Silverstein at the Pipeline Cafe in Honolulu, Hawaii in late February. Madina Lake is also a supporting act of Alesana's VS. Tour, along with The Bled, Broadway, Enter Shikari, and Asking Alexandria at select locations.

Madina Lake played at the Soundwave festival 2009 from February 21 through March 2. After Soundwave they played three shows in Japan with Less Than Jake, followed by a slot in Leeds and Reading festivals in August, an East Coast tour in America in September, and a UK and Europe tour in October.

=== The Dresden Codex (2010) ===
The band toured the UK as part of the 'Arlene Ball tour' in March and April 2010, with support from We Are The Ocean and Mayday Parade. Local bands got the chance of a support slot through a competition Madina Lake ran with Atticus Clothing. It was intended to support their new EP, The Dresden Codex, which according to vocalist Nathan Leone sounds closer to their debut "From Them, Through Us, To You" than "Attics to Eden". The name of the album refers to a Mayan astrological codex, one of the oldest existing, as it is thought to be a copy of an even older text. This holds with Madina Lake's tradition of bringing astrology into their backstory, known colloquially as 'The Folklore'. The Dresden Codex was recorded in South Beach, Florida, in early 2010, and made appearances at the UK Sonisphere Festival on August 1 and Hevy Music Festival on August 8, 2010 in Kent. In May 2010 it was announced via an interview with Rocksound that they had left their record label, Roadrunner.

On 30 June, bassist Matthew Leone was hospitalized after intervening in a domestic violence incident involving a man beating his wife. He suffered many injuries including a fractured skull, broken jaw and a swollen brain. On August 2, it was reported that Leone was recovering from "a second significant surgery, and is on his way to recovery." Just days earlier, The Smashing Pumpkins, the favorite band of both Leone brothers, played a benefit show in Chicago for Matthew to pay his hospital bills. They raised $80,000.

=== World War III, From Them, Through Us, To You reunion (2011–2013, 2017–Present) ===
The band played the first two weeks of the 2011 Vans Warped Tour.

It was confirmed via an interview with NBC that Sony had signed the band at the beginning of April and their new record World War III will be released September 13, 2011, as recording was complete as of April 17. The new album will be the third and final installment of their concept trilogy, World War III, which continues the Leone brothers' tales of a metaphorical universe.

In the final chapter, World War III, concludes with the discovery of Adalia and an epic battle of good and evil that mirrors human internal struggles with self. The album was produced, engineered and mixed by Mateo Camargo and Madina Lake except the song "Imagineer" which was produced and written by Billy Corgan (Smashing Pumpkins) and Madina Lake.

On July 5, 2012 Madina Lake announced the 'Trilogy Finale Tour' that would spread across 8 days, playing 8 shows in small and intimate venues across the UK. Along with this tour they announced that guitarist Mateo would be joining them on the finale tour across the UK. Madina Lake went on to announce that they would be playing their debut album 'From Them, Through Us, To You' in its entirety as well as other songs from their next 2 albums to wrap up the story of fictional character 'Adalia.' As well as general admission tickets, package deals would be available, the £25 package offered a 'disappearance' t-shirt, trilogy book as well as entrance to the show. The £50 package would offer the same as the £25 package along with a pre-show meet and greet as well as a Q and A session with the band regarding the story and concept behind the disappearance of Adalia.

On 21 January 2017, Madina Lake updated their Facebook cover photo with an old style 'programme interruption' picture with the words 'Please Stand By', hinting at a possible reunion.

On 15 February, Madina Lake announced a six show United Kingdom Reunion Tour, including three dates at Slam Dunk Festival, in May 2017.

On 21 February 2017, Madina Lake announced that they would release new music in support of the reunion shows.

On 3 April 2020, the band released a new song called Playing With Fire, their first offering of new material since 2011.

In July 2020, the band announced details of a new EP called 'The Beginning Of New Endings', which was originally set to be released on 4 September 2020. After a few set backs, the EP was eventually released on 28 September 2020.

In an interview with DEAD PRESS! in September 2020, bassist Matthew Leone confirmed that the band were working on releasing another EP before the end of 2020.

In February 2025, Madina Lake played a 7-date UK Headline tour to celebrate their 20th anniversary with support from Greywind and Bad Luck.

In September 2026, the band were announced as support (alongside The Red Jumpsuit Apparatus) for Elliot Minor on the It Wasn’t Just A Phase Tour. Several days later, the band announced that they had quietly been working on a new EP for 2027 to celebrate the 20th anniversary of their debut album From Them, Through Us, To You.

== Concept ==
The band sets its music in a fictional town from the 1950s isolated from the rest of the world that's been turned upside-down with the mysterious disappearance of their most famous socialite, Adalia. The music provides an outlet for the band's views on politics, culture, and the media's obsession with celebrity status. The theme behind the band's music is in relation to the mystery of Adalia. The album artwork shows images of her and the mysteries behind her and the town of Madina Lake. It's a concept from the mind of Matthew Leone that is set to span three albums and includes a book (Lila, the Divine Game) as well as a website devoted to helping fans solve the case by uncovering "clues" hidden in the lyrics, album art, and videos.

== Members ==
Current members

- Nathan Leone – lead vocals
- Matthew Leone – bass, backing vocals
- Mateo Camargo – guitar, backing vocals (2005–2013, 2017–present); keyboards, synthesizer, programming (2005–2013, 2017–present)
- Chris Mason – drums, backing vocals (2017–present)

Former members

- Shawn Currie – keyboards, synthesizer, programming (2005)
- Dan "Chizel" Torelli – drums, backing vocals (2005–2013)

Timeline

== Discography ==
=== Studio albums ===
- From Them, Through Us, to You (2007)
- Attics to Eden (2009)
- World War III (2011)

=== Extended plays ===
- The Disappearance of Adalia (2006)
- The Dresden Codex (2010)
- The Beginning Of New Endings (2020)
