= Flying kick (football) =

In Rugby and other forms of football derived from it, a flying kick (also called a fly kick or dribble) is made by kicking the ball from where it is loose under circumstances other than its having been placed there or dropped from the kicker's hands to be kicked. The flying kick has been illegal in American football since 1900 but is still allowed in Canadian football, Rugby Union and Rugby League.

In the 19th century, a punt was sometimes also referred to as a fly kick.
