= Philippines men's national sepak takraw team =

The Philippines men's national sepak takraw team represents the Philippines in international sepak takraw matches and competitions and is organized by the Philippine Amateur Sepak Takraw Association.

== History ==
The Philippines has been competing in the sepak takraw events of the Southeast Asian Games.

The national team joined the first ISTAF World Cup in 2011 which was hosted by Malaysia winning over Bangladesh and Brunei enabling the team to join the inaugural 2011–12 ISTAF SuperSeries (ISS). The head coach for the 2011-2012 season was Rodolfo Eco led by players, John John Bobier and Jason Huerte.

At the King's Cup, the Philippines won the gold medal of Division I of the doubles event by defeating Brunei by 3-2.

They were set to participate at the next ISS series in 2013–14 but they did not enter in any of the four tournaments of the series. The Philippines was to be led by head coach Hector Memarion.

The Philippines did not participate at the first three tournaments of the 2014–15 ISTAF SuperSeries and were only invited to enter the fourth and Final tournament along with India after China and Indonesia withdrew from the ISS Final. The Philippines later made its best finish in the ISTAF SuperSeries so far by beating Japan in the third-place play-off.

== Competitive records ==
=== ISTAF World Cup ===
Year	Round	GP	W	L
(Malaysia) 2011	Quarter-final	4	2	2
(Singapore) 2015	To be determined			

=== ISTAF SuperSeries ===
Year	ISS (Series)	Round	GP	W	L
2011–12	Thailand	Quarter-final	3	2	1
2011–12	Indonesia	Did not enter			
2011–12	Singapore	Quarter-final	4	1	3
2011–12	(Thailand) Finals	Quarter-final	3	1	2
2013–14	India	Did not enter			
2013–14	Thailand	Did not enter			
2013–14	Malaysia	Did not enter			
2013–14	(Malaysia) Finals	Did not enter			
2014–15	Myanmar	Did not enter			
2014–15	Malaysia	Did not enter			
2014–15	Korea	Did not enter			
2014–15	(Thailand) Finals	(bronze) Third Place	5	3	2
Total	–	–	15	7	8

=== King's Cup World Championship ===
Year	Medals		
Year	1st place, gold medalist(s)	2nd place, silver medalist(s)	3rd place, bronze medalist(s)
1992–2012	0	0	0
2013	5	0	0
2014	0	0	1
2015	0	1	1
2016	20	0	0

=== Southeast Asian Games ===
Year	Medals		
Year	1st place, gold medalist(s)	2nd place, silver medalist(s)	3rd place, bronze medalist(s)
(Malaysia) 1977– (Vietnam) 2003	?		
(Philippines) 2005	0	0	1
(Laos) 2009	0	0	3
(Indonesia) 2011	0	0	1
(Myanmar) 2013	0	0	1
(Singapore) 2015	0	1	1
(Malaysia) 2017	0	2	1
(Philippines) 2019	1	0	2

=== Asian Games ===
Year	Medals		
Year	1st place, gold medalist(s)	2nd place, silver medalist(s)	3rd place, bronze medalist(s)
(China) 1990	Did not enter		
(Japan) 1994	Did not enter		
(Thailand) 1998	0	0	0
(South Korea) 2002	0	0	0
(Qatar) 2006	0	0	0
(China) 2010	0	0	0
(South Korea) 2014	Did not enter		
(Indonesia) 2018	0	0	0
Total	0	0	0

== Recent squad ==
The following players composes the Philippines national team at the 2014–15 ISTAF SuperSeries

- Jason Huerte
- Emmanuel Escote
- Rheyjey Ortouste
- Arnel Isorena
- Ronsited Gabayeron
- Carl Togonon

Source: ISTAF SuperSeries
