= Indira Gandhi Stadium =

Indira Gandhi Stadium may refer to:

- Indira Gandhi Arena, an indoor games stadium in Delhi, India
- Indira Gandhi Athletic Stadium, a football stadium in Guwahati, Assam, India
- Indira Gandhi International Sports Stadium, a multipurpose sports stadium in Haldwani, Uttarakhand, India
- Indira Gandhi Sports Stadium, a multipurpose sports stadium in Puducherry, India
- Indira Gandhi Stadium (Kohima), a multipurpose sports stadium in Kohima, Nagaland, India
- Indira Gandhi Stadium (Alwar), a cricket stadium in Alwar, Rajasthan, India
- Indira Gandhi Stadium (Solapur), a cricket stadium in Solapur, Maharashtra, India
- Indira Gandhi Stadium (Una), a cricket stadium in Una, Himachal Pradesh, India
- Indira Gandhi Stadium (Purnia), a 10,000-capacity cricket stadium in Purnia, Bihar, India
- Indira Gandhi Stadium (Vijayawada), a cricket stadium in Vijayawada, Andhra Pradesh, India
- Indira Gandhi International Sports Stadium (Haldwani)
