= 2013–14 ISTAF SuperSeries =

- Venue: (India) Indira Gandhi Sports Stadium; (Thailand) Fashion Island; (Malaysia) Likas Sports Complex; (Malaysia) Tittiwangsa Stadium
- Location: New Delhi, India; Bangkok, Thailand; Kota Kinabalu, Malaysia; Kuala Lumpur, Malaysia
- Dates: 29 August 2013 – 9 March 2014
- Competitors: 56 teams from 18 nations
- Website: http://istafsuperseries.com

Champion
- Thailand
- Men: Thailand
- Women: Thailand

The 2013–14 ISTAF SuperSeries is the second season of an elite sepaktakraw international, ISTAF SuperSeries, organized by the International Sepaktakraw Federation (ISTAF). The top-ranking national teams to vie for ISTAF World ranking points over 4 SuperSeries tournaments. Building on the inaugural success of the 2011–12 ISTAF SuperSeries, the ISTAF is looking to expand the global appeal of sepaktakraw with this season.

The first series of the tournament opened on 29 August 2013 at Indira Gandhi Sports Stadium in New Delhi, the capital city of India, which was the first time that the tournament was conducted outside South East Asia. Followed by series 2 in Bangkok, and the third, in Kota Kinabalu of Malaysia, before concluding with the final series held in Kuala Lumpur.

The overall winner for the 2013–14 ISTAF SuperSeries for both Men's and Women's is Thailand. In the men's competition, ranking points were extremely tight with the first place being decided in the finals where Thailand played well under pressure and leaving Malaysia with second place. As Japan participated in all four legs of these tournaments, their accumulated points led to the third spot. For the women's competition, Thailand was the clear cut winner with a perfect 1000 points scored from their first placing in all 4 legs of the season. Vietnam took second place with Malaysia just 10 points behind to take third.

== Tournament Summary ==
=== Series details ===
Series	Host	Men's event				Women's event			
Series	Host	Team	Gold	Silver	Bronze	Team	Gold	Silver	Bronze
1	(India) New Delhi	10	South Korea	Malaysia	Indonesia	7	Thailand	Indonesia	Vietnam
2	(Thailand) Bangkok	11	Thailand	Malaysia	USA	7	Thailand	South Korea	Vietnam
3	(Malaysia) Kota Kinabalu	9	Thailand	Malaysia	Indonesia	5	Thailand	Vietnam	Indonesia
4	(Malaysia) Kuala Lumpur	13	Thailand	Malaysia	South Korea	9	Thailand	Malaysia	Indonesia

=== Medals Tally ===
Men's event
Rank	Teams	Gold	Silver	Bronze	Total
1	Thailand	3	-	-	3
2	South Korea	1	-	1	2
3	Malaysia	-	4	-	4
4	Indonesia	-	-	2	2
5	USA	-	-	1	1

Women's event
Rank	Teams	Gold	Silver	Bronze	Total
1	Thailand	4	-	-	4
2	Vietnam	-	1	2	3
3	Indonesia	-	1	2	3
4	Malaysia	-	1	-	1
5	South Korea	-	1	-	1

== ISS Series 1 India ==
2013–14 ISS Series 1 India
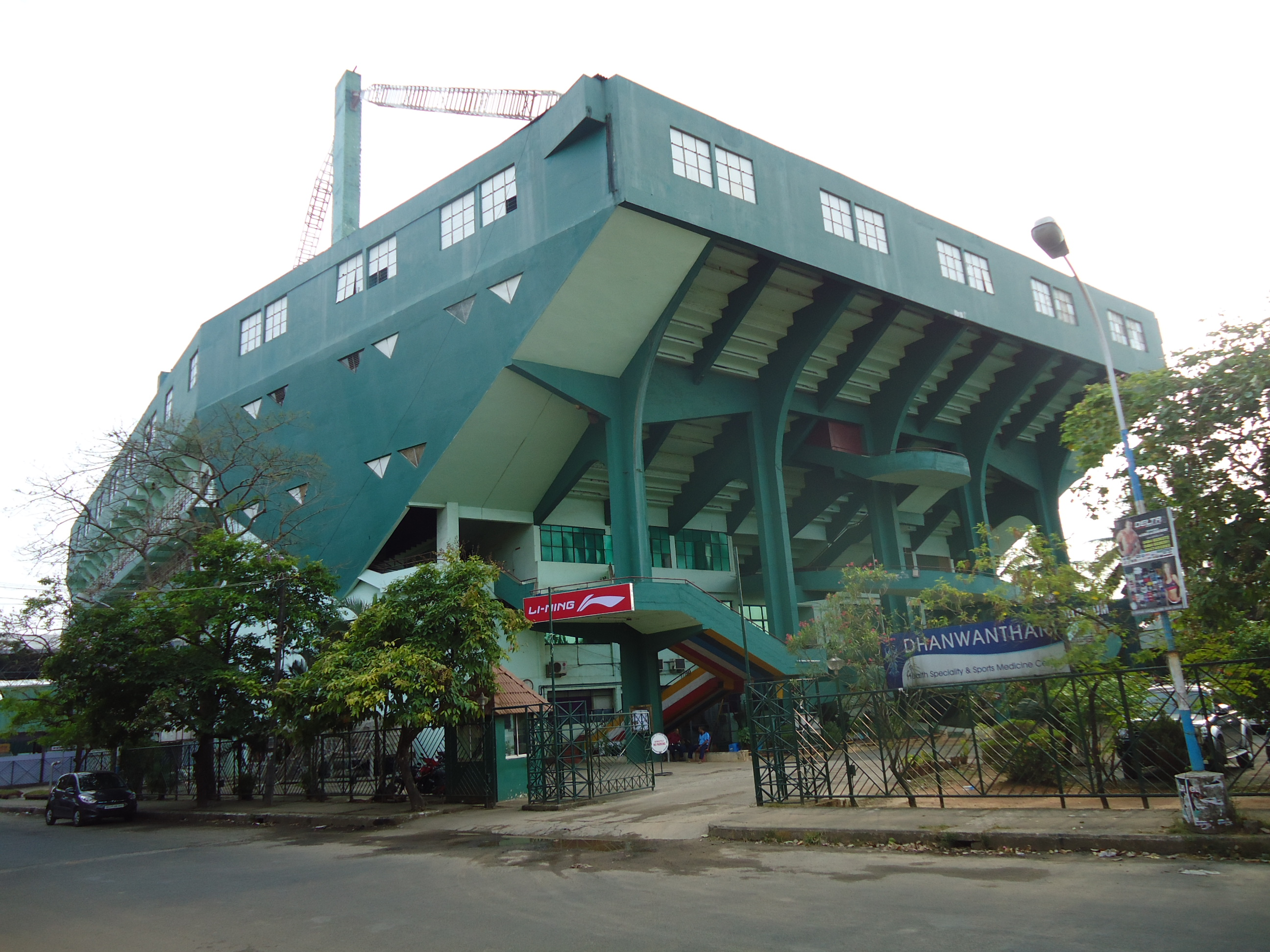
- Indira Gandhi Sports Stadium, the venue of the tournament.
- Genre: Sport event
- Begins: August 29, 2013
- Ends: September 1, 2013
- Venue: Indira Gandhi Sports Stadium
- Locations: New Delhi, India
- Participants: Men: 10 teams; Women: 7 teams
- Organiser: International Sepaktakraw Federation
- Sponsor: Marathon (Thailand) Co., Ltd.; Warrix Sports

The first leg of the ISTAF SuperSeries 2013/14 season kicked off in the Indira Gandhi Sports Complex in New Delhi, India from 29 August 2013 to 1 September 2013. This is the first ISTAF SuperSeries tournament held outside South East Asia, demonstrating ISTAF's vision of its global promotion of the sport.

ISTAF SuperSeries India 2013/14 was held over 4 days which brought 12 nations together and a total of 17 teams participating in this elite sepaktakraw tournament. The shocker in this ISS was the quarter-finals round between second placed Korea from Group C and first placed Thailand from Group A.

Korea knocked out Thailand in 3 straights sets to proceed on to the semi-finals stage, and unfortunately for Thailand who could only content with a fifth-placed finish.

Host India was given a pass into the quarter-finals where they defeated Iran but missed out on the making it to the finals after being edged out by Malaysia in the semi-finals stage. Malaysia then went on to meet with Korea, who proved to be worthy winners of the ISS India leg of the season despite losing their opening group match.

India Women's team faced a tougher route as they were seeded fourth and were edged out by Vietnam and Indonesia in the group stages. The Women's finals was contested by Thailand and Indonesia who topped their group in the earlier round robin matches, leaving Vietnam and Malaysia to fight for third.

For the first time, Sepaktakraw was broadcast to over 1.4 billion television audiences throughout the Indian sub-continent through a landmark partnership between Asia Sports Ventures and Doordarshan.

=== Team Allocation ===
The group stage of men's events, saw 10 men's teams dividing into 2 groups of 3 and 2 groups of 2. Meanwhile, in the group stage of women's events, saw 7 teams were divided into 2 groups, one group having 3 teams and the other having 4. Each team competed in a round-robin match format where groups with 3-4 teams played all other teams once and groups with 2 teams played each other twice.

The group stage result is based on points accumulated, the top 2 teams from each group advanced to the quarter-finals or playoff stage while the host nation, India, advances automatically to the playoff round.

=== Participating Countries ===
Men's event
Host	India		
Group A	Group B	Group C	Group D
Thailand	Malaysia	Indonesia	India
Japan	Iran	South Korea	Singapore
—N/a	USA	Brunei	—N/a

Women's event
Host	India
Group A	Group B
Indonesia	Thailand
Vietnam	Malaysia
South Korea	Japan
India	—N/a

=== Men's results ===
Group A (Men)

Group A
Rank	Country	Games played	Win	Lost	Pts
1	Thailand	2	2	0	6
2	Japan	2	0	2	0

Thailand	3-0	Japan
Japan	0-3	Thailand

Group B (Men)

Group B
Rank	Country	Games played	Win	Lost	Pts
1	Malaysia	2	2	0	6
2	Iran	2	1	1	3
3	USA	2	0	2	1

Malaysia	3-0	USA
USA	1-3	Iran
Iran	0-3	Malaysia

Group C (Men)

Group C
Rank	Country	Games played	Win	Lost	Pts
1	Indonesia	2	2	0	6
2	South Korea	2	1	1	4
3	Brunei	2	0	2	0

South Korea	3-0	Brunei
Brunei	0-3	Indonesia
Indonesia	3-1	South Korea

Group D (Men)

Group D
Rank	Country	Games played	Win	Lost	Pts
1	India	2	2	0	6
2	Singapore	2	0	2	2

India	3-2	Singapore
Singapore	0-3	India

Knock-out Rounds (Men)

Quarter-finals
31 Aug
Singapore	0
Myanmar	3
31 Aug
Iran	1
India	3
31 Aug
Japan	0
Indonesia	3
31 Aug
South Korea	3
Thailand	0

Semi-finals
31 Aug
Malaysia	3
India	1
31 Aug
Indonesia	0
South Korea	3

Final
1 Sep
Malaysia	0
South Korea	3
Third place
1 Sep
India	0
Indonesia	3

=== Women's results ===
Group A (Women)

Group A
Rank	Country	Games played	Win	Lost	Pts
1	Indonesia	3	3	0	9
2	Vietnam	3	2	1	6
3	South Korea	3	1	2	3
4	India	3	10	3	0

Indonesia	3-0	South Korea
India	0-3	Indonesia
Vietnam	3-0	South Korea
India	0-3	Vietnam
Vietnam	0-3	Indonesia
South Korea	3-0	India

Group B (Women)

Group B
Rank	Country	Games played	Win	Lost	Pts
1	Thailand	2	2	0	6
2	Malaysia	2	1	1	3
3	Japan	2	0	2	1

Japan	0-3	Thailand
Thailand	3-0	Malaysia
Malaysia	3-1	Japan

Knock-out Rounds (Women)

Semi-finals
31 Aug
Indonesia	3
Malaysia	0
31 Aug
Thailand	3
Vietnam	0

Final
1 Sep
Thailand	3
Indonesia	1
Third place
1 Sep
Malaysia	0
Vietnam	3

== ISS Series 2 Thailand ==
2013–14 ISS Series 2 Thailand
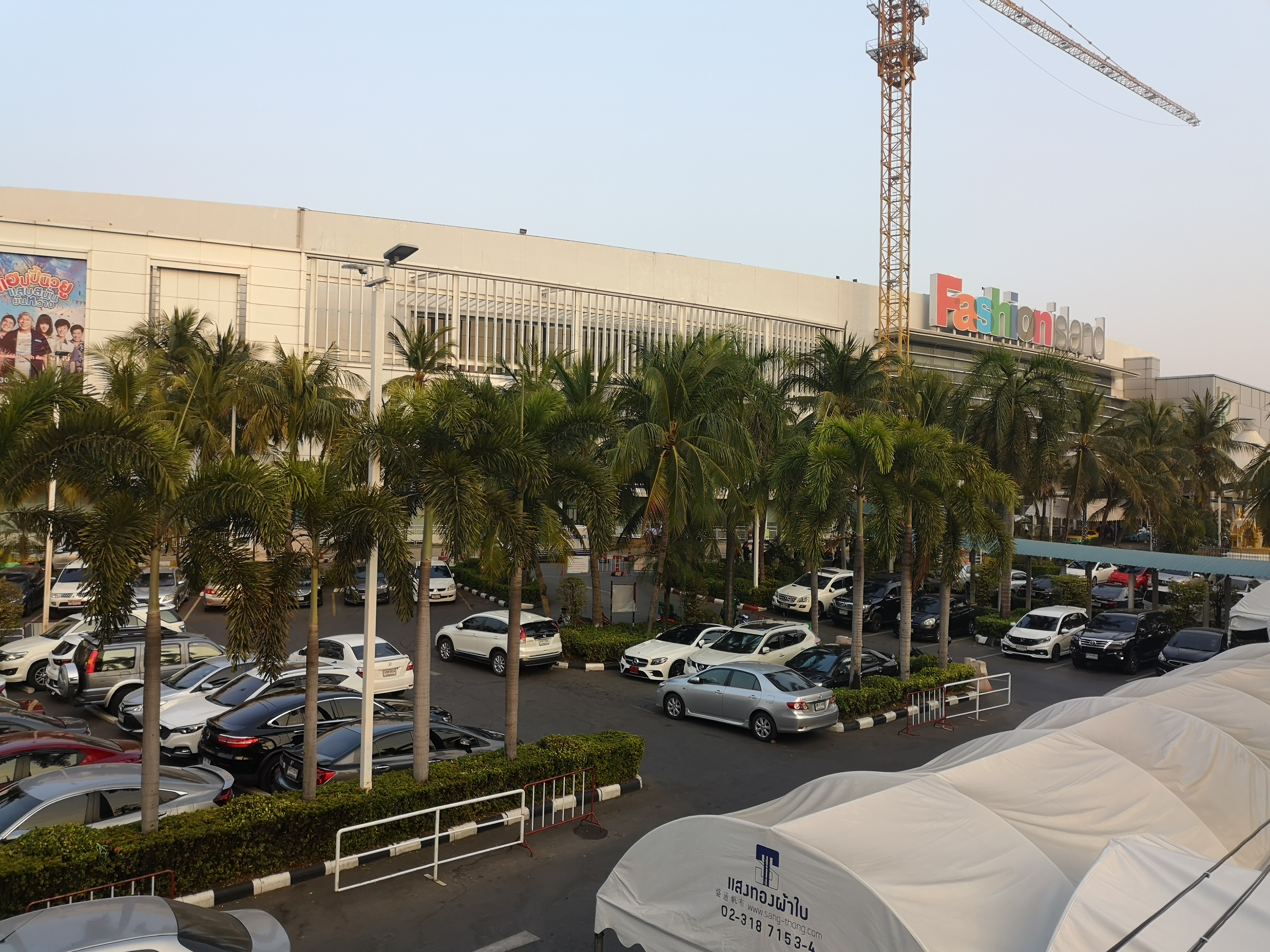
- Indira Gandhi Sports Stadium, the venue of the tournament.
- Genre: Sport event
- Begins: September 26, 2013
- Ends: September 29, 2013
- Venue: Fashion Island
- Locations: Bangkok, Thailand
- Participants: Men: 11 teams; Women: 8 teams
- Organiser: International Sepaktakraw Federation
- Sponsor: Marathon (Thailand) Co., Ltd.; Warrix Sports

The series 2 of the 2013–14 ISTAF SuperSeries was staged at Fashion Island (Bangkok) in Bangkok, Thailand from 26 to 29 September 2013. It was the third time that ISTAF SuperSeries has returned to Thailand, since hosting the inaugural tournament in 2011 and the final series of the 2011-2012 season. In this series, a change was made to the group stage matches where teams played to a best of three sets instead of the usual 5 sets, up to 15 points. This decision was made to benefit teams who have to play more matches on the same day to prevent wearing out the players.

With South Korea creating an upset over Thailand in the previous leg, Thailand is eager to draw blood on their home ground and displayed full dominance as they put up a flawless team performance to beat Iran in less than 20 minutes for their opening group match. They then pushed through their way to the finals without dropping a single set. Malaysia was close behind, finishing second, after an incredibly tight match against South Korea in the semi-finals.

The Thailand women's team also cruised to a victory over South Korea in the finals while Vietnam outlasted Malaysia in a classic ranking match between the two beaten semi-finalists. In the 5th t0 7th placing matches, China defeated both India and Japan to secure extra World ranking points while India finally recorded their first win over Japan in series.

The 2013–14 ISS Series 2 Thailand was televised on Thailand's leading network Channel 3. Sports fans in the region got to enjoy almost eight hours of live TV coverage, as well as selected matches featuring the Thai men's and women's teams.

=== Team Allocation ===
The group stage of the men's event saw 11 teams dividing into 3 groups of 3 and 1 group of 2, while the first round of the women's race, saw 8 women's teams equally divided into 2 groups. Each team competed in a round-robin match format where groups with 3-4 teams played all other teams once and groups with 2 teams played each other twice. The group stage result is based on points accumulated, the top 2 teams from each group advanced to the quarter-finals or playoff stage.

=== Participating Countries ===
Men's event
Host	Thailand		
Group A	Group B	Group C	Group D
South Korea	Malaysia	USA	Thailand
China	Japan	Singapore	Brunei
India	Germany	—N/a	Iran

Women's event
Host	Thailand
Group A	Group B
Thailand	South Korea
Vietnam	Malaysia
Japan	China
India	Indonesia

=== Men's results ===
Group A (Men)

Group A
Rank	Country	Games played	Win	Lost	Pts
1	South Korea	2	2	0	4
2	China	2	1	1	2
3	India	2	0	2	0

South Korea	2-0	China
China	2-0	India
India	0-2	South Korea

Group B (Men)

Group B
Rank	Country	Games played	Win	Lost	Pts
1	Malaysia	2	2	0	12
2	Japan	2	1	1	2
3	Germany	2	0	2	0

Malaysia	2-0	Japan
Germany	0-2	Malaysia
Japan	2-0	Germany

Group C (Men)

Group C
Rank	Country	Games played	Win	Lost	Pts
1	USA	2	1	1	2
2	Singapore	2	1	1	2

Singapore	0-2	USA
USA	0-2	Singapore

Group D (Men)

Group D
Rank	Country	Games played	Win	Lost	Pts
1	Thailand	2	2	0	4
2	Brunei	2	1	1	2
3	Iran	2	0	2	1

Thailand	2-0	Iran
Brunei	0-2	Thailand
Iran	1-2	Brunei

Knock-out Rounds (Men)

Semi-finals
28 Sep
South Korea	2
Malaysia	3
28 Sep
USA	0
Thailand	3

Final
29 Sep
Malaysia	0
Thailand	3
Third place
29 Sep
USA	-
-	-

=== Women's results ===
Group A (Women)

Group A
Rank	Country	Games played	Win	Lost	Pts
1	Thailand	3	3	0	6
2	Vietnam	3	2	1	4
3	Japan	3	1	2	2
4	India	3	0	3	0

Thailand	2-0	India
Japan	0-2	Vietnam
Japan	0-2	Thailand
Vietnam	2-0	India
Thailand	2-0	Vietnam
India	0-2	Japan

Group B (Women)

Group B
Rank	Country	Games played	Win	Lost	Pts
1	South Korea	3	3	0	6
2	Malaysia	3	2	1	4
3	China	3	1	2	2
4	Indonesia	3	0	3	0

China	2-0	Indonesia
South Korea	2-0	Malaysia
Malaysia	2-0	China
Indonesia	0-2	South Korea
South Korea	2-0	China
Malaysia	2-0	Indonesia

Knock-out Rounds (Women)

Semi-finals
28 Sep
Thailand	3
Malaysia	0
28 Sep
South Korea	3
Vietnam	1

Final
29 Sep
Thailand	3
South Korea	0
Third place
29 Sep
Vietnam	3
Malaysia	2

== ISS Series 3 Malaysia ==
2013–14 ISS Series 3 Malaysia
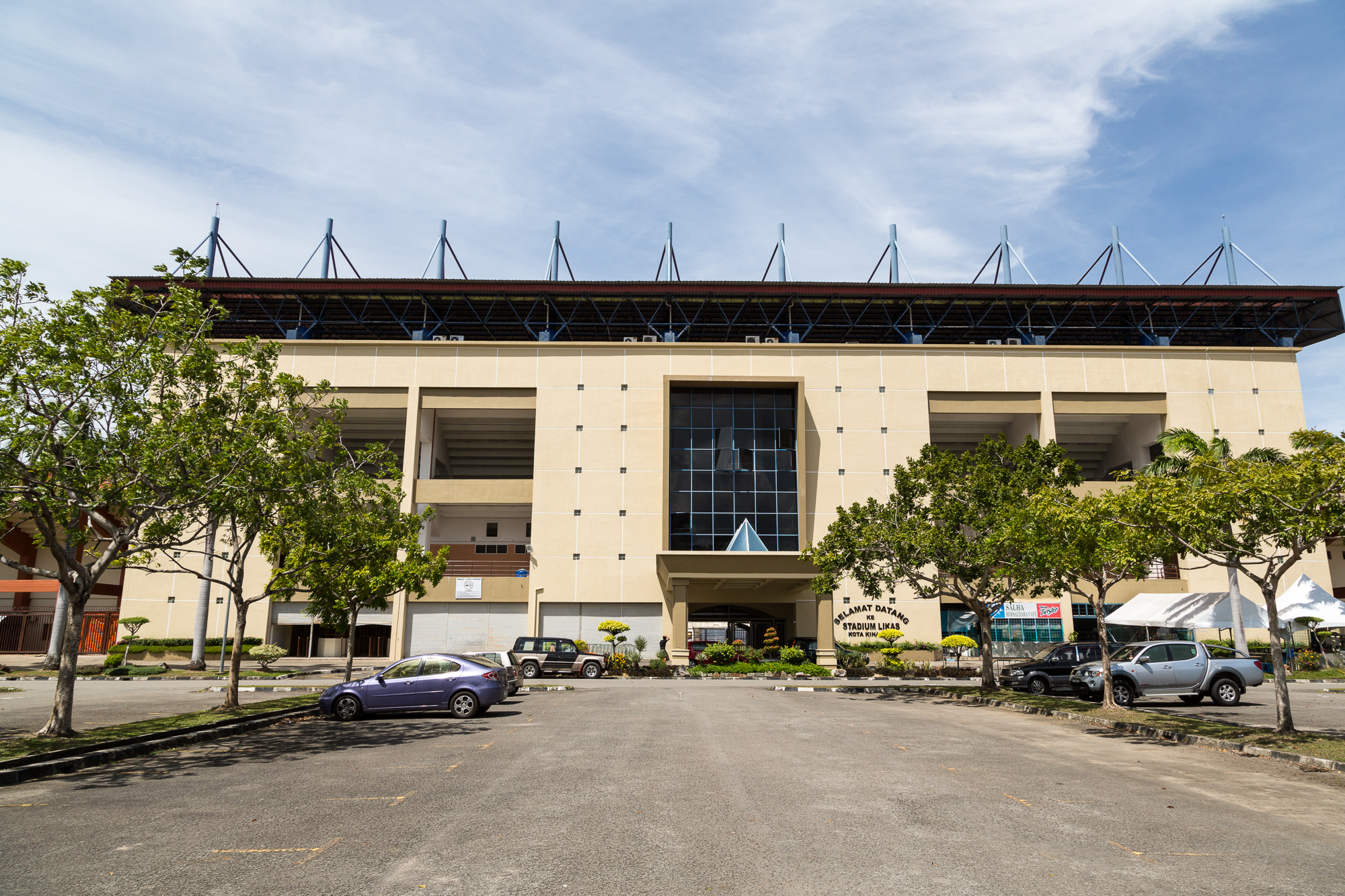
- Likas Sports Complex, the venue of the tournament.
- Genre: Sport event
- Begins: October 31, 2013
- Ends: November 3, 2013
- Venue: Likas Sports Complex
- Locations: Kota Kinabalu, Malaysia
- Participants: Men: 9 teams; Women: 5 teams
- Organiser: International Sepaktakraw Federation
- Sponsor: Marathon (Thailand) Co., Ltd.; Warrix Sports

The third round of the ISTAF SuperSeries 2013/14 season was held in Likas Sports Complex in Sabah, Malaysia from 31 October to 3 November 2013.

Heading into this third leg, Host Malaysia find themselves on top of the ISTAF SuperSeries 2013/14 season rankings, having finished second in the earlier two legs. They are joined by 8 other countries in the Men's Divisions. In the Women's division, there was a total of 5 teams joining this leg of the tournament after Korea failed to appear at ISS Sabah 2013/14.

Host Malaysia faced a scare in the quarter-final match against neighbours Singapore but managed to turn their rhythm around with the substitution of their striker, Hanafiah Dollah. Malaysia then proceeded to take down Japan in the semi-finals in three straight sets and met with Thailand in the finals, who won their semi-finals match against Indonesia. Malaysia took down the first two sets in the finals but Thailand came back strong with the substitution of their server. Tanawat Chumsena took over the serving circle from first choice server Rattadech Noijaroen. Eventually, Thailand proved to be too strong for the hosts, causing Malaysia to ultimately fail in their quest to clinch a win before thousands of home fans.

The Women's group stage matches saw host Malaysia cruising through to the quarter-finals after Korea failed to turn up. Unfortunately for the host, Malaysia finished second behind Vietnam and went on to meet Thailand, who topped group B, in the semi-finals. At the end of the day, it was Thailand who emerged victorious against Vietnam, experimenting with a two strikers formation at the net.

ISTAF SuperSeries Malaysia 2013/14 was televised on ASTRO Arena, providing eight hours of live TV coverage to sports fans around the region, including selected matches featuring the Malaysia National teams.

This leg of the tournament also saw the introduction of the Ultra Slow Motion cameras which raised the level of Television production for the ISTAF SuperSeries tournament. Fans were able to watch Ultra Slow Mo playback of the Sepaktakraw action in High Definition which greatly enhanced the viewer experience.

=== Men’s Draw ===
The first round, or Group Stage saw 9 Men's teams dividing into 2 groups with 4 teams in Group A and 5 teams in Group B. Teams competed in a round robin match format where each team plays against every other team once.

Based on points accumulated, the top 2 teams from each group advanced to the quarter-finals, or Playoff stage.

=== Women's Draw ===
The first round, or Group Stage, saw 5 women's teams with Group A having 2 teams and Group B having 3 teams. Teams play in a round robin format with the two teams in Group A playing each other twice.

Based on points accumulated, the top 2 teams from each group advanced to the semi-finals, or Playoff Stage.

=== Participating Countries ===
Men's event
Host	Malaysia
Group A	Group B
Malaysia	Thailand
Indonesia	Japan
India	Singapore
Iran	Brunei
—N/a	Germany

Women's event
Host	Malaysia
Group A	Group B
Vietnam	Thailand
Malaysia	Indonesia
—N/a	Japan

=== Men's results ===
Group A (Men)

Group A
Rank	Country	Games played	Win	Lost	Pts
1	Malaysia	3	3	0	6
2	Indonesia	3	2	1	5
3	India	3	1	2	2
4	Iran	3	0	3	1

Malaysia	2-0	Iran
Indonesia	2-0	India
Iran	0-2	Indonesia
India	0-2	Malaysia
Iran	1-2	India
Malaysia	2-1	Indonesia

Group B (Men)

Group B
Rank	Country	Games played	Win	Lost	Pts
1	Thailand	4	4	0	8
2	Japan	4	3	1	6
3	Singapore	4	2	2	5
4	Brunei	4	1	3	4
5	Germany	4	0	4	2

Thailand	2-0	Japan
Brunei	1-2	Singapore
Germany	0-2	Thailand
Japan	2-1	Brunei
Singapore	2-1	Germany
Brunei	0-2	Thailand
Singapore	1-2	Japan
Germany	0-2	Brunei
Thailand	2-0	Singapore
Japan	2-1	Germany

Knock-out Rounds (Men)

Quarter-finals
2 Nov
Malaysia	2
Singapore	1
2 Nov
Japan	2
India	1
2 Nov
Indonesia	2
Indonesia	0
2 Nov
Thailand	2
Iran	0

Semi-finals
3 Nov
Malaysia	3
Japan	1
3 Nov
Indonesia	0
Thailand	3

Final
3 Nov
Thailand	3
Malaysia	2
Third place
3 Nov
Japan	0
Indonesia	3

=== Women's results ===
Group A (Women)

Group A
Rank	Country	Games played	Win	Lost	Pts
1	Vietnam	2	2	0	4
2	Malaysia	2	0	2	2

Malaysia	1-2	Vietnam
Vietnam	2-1	Malaysia

Group B (Women)

Group B
Rank	Country	Games played	Win	Lost	Pts
1	Thailand	2	2	0	4
2	Indonesia	2	1	1	2

Thailand	2-0	Japan
Japan	0-2	Indonesia
Indonesia	0-2	Thailand

Knock-out Rounds (Women)

Semi-finals
2 Nov
Thailand	3
Malaysia	0
2 Nov
Vietnam	3
Indonesia	0

Final
3 Nov
Thailand	3
Vietnam	0
Third place
3 Nov
Malaysia	0
Indonesia	2

== ISS Final Series Kuala Lumpur ==
2013–14 ISS Series 3 Malaysia
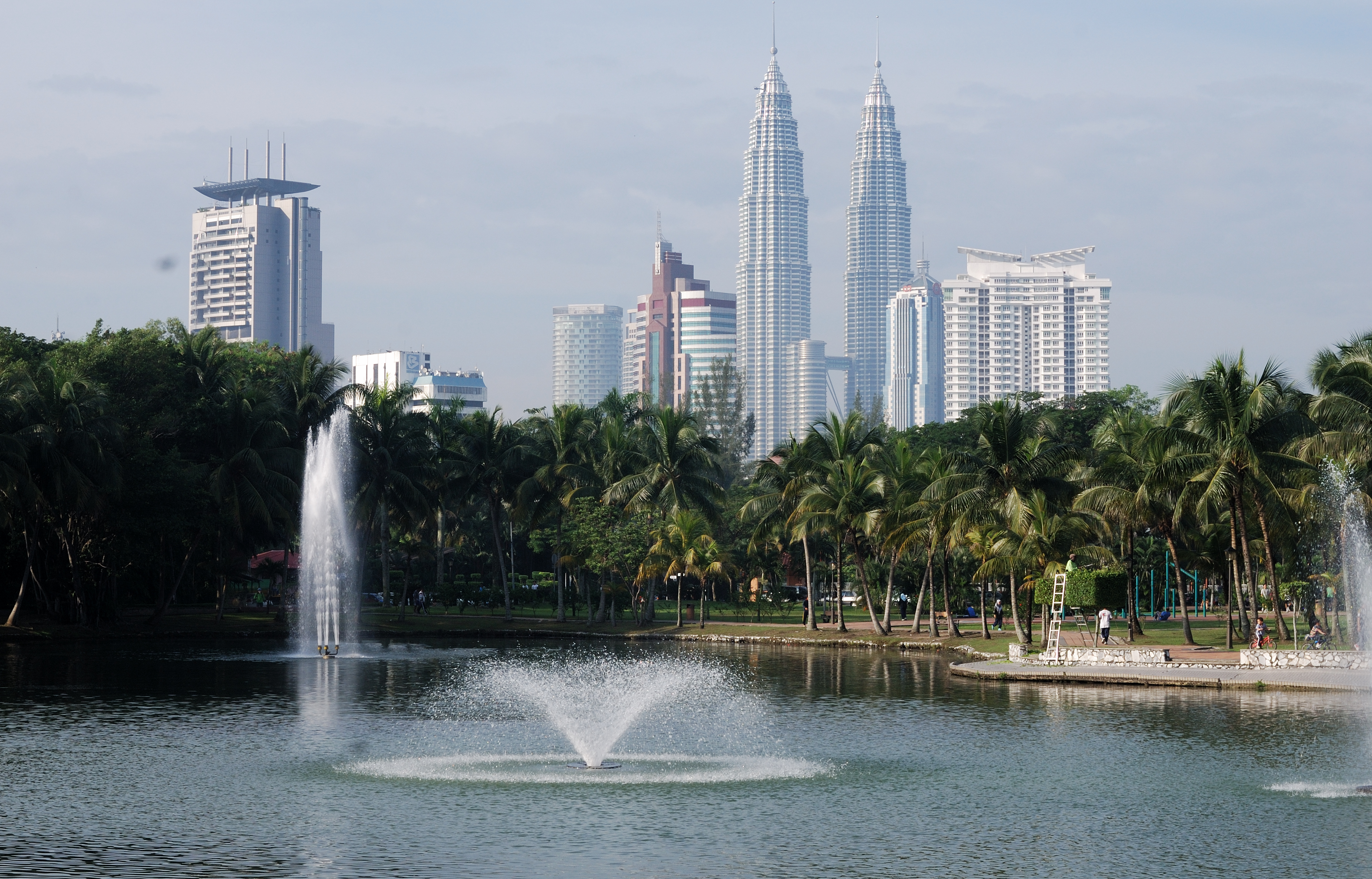
- Kuala Lumpur, the host city of the tournament.
- Genre: Sport event
- Begins: March 5, 2014
- Ends: March 9, 2014
- Venue: Likas Sports Complex
- Locations: Kuala Lumpur, Malaysia
- Participants: Men: 13 teams; Women: 9 teams
- Organiser: International Sepaktakraw Federation
- Sponsor: Marathon (Thailand) Co., Ltd.; Warrix Sports

The finals of the ISTAF SuperSeries 2013/14 season was held at the Tittiwangsa Stadium in Kuala Lumpur from 5 to 9 March 2014.

With such a strong crowd support for Sepaktakraw in Malaysia as seen in the Sabah leg of the tournament, ISTAF decided to hold the finals of the ISS 2013/14 in the capital of Malaysia this time round. Malaysia and Thailand entered into the finals being on level in their ISS ranking points. There was a total of 22 teams, 9 Women's and 13 Men's including the introduction of a wild card team, France, after a solid performance in the inaugural ISTAF World Cup 2011.

The Men's finals match of the ISS KL Finals proved to be a repeat of the ISS Sabah leg, setting the stage for an explosive tussle for Gold between Malaysia and Thailand. At the end of the day, it was Thailand who emerged overall champion despite Malaysia having home ground advantage. Korea returned to the ISTAF SuperSeries tournament after their missing out on the previous ISS Sabah leg, and finished off the season with a satisfactory third place in ISS KL Finals.

In the Women's competition, Malaysia entered the finals for the first time in ISTAF SuperSeries history under the lead of their star striker Rahilah Binti Harun and delighting the home crowd. They came up against Thailand in the finals, who has retained the title since the start of the ISTAF SuperSeries tournaments. Although it was a step up for the host, Thailand still proved to be a class above and clinched Gold for the 8th consecutive time. In the 3rd/4th placement match, Indonesia finished their ISTAF SuperSeries 2013/14 journey with a well-deserved and hard-won Bronze in the ISS KL finals against Myanmar.

=== Men’s Draw ===
The first round, or Group Stage saw 13 Men's teams dividing into 3 groups with 3 teams and 1 group with 4 teams. Teams competed in a round robin match format where each team plays against every other team once.

Based on points accumulated, the top 2 teams from each group advanced to the quarter-finals.

=== Women's Draw ===
The ISS KL Finals saw 9 women's teams with 3 groups having 3 teams each playing in a round robin format in the Group Stage.

Based on points accumulated, the top teams from each group advanced to the semi-finals, or Playoff Stage. The second placed teams from the 3 groups then undergo a second round stage playing in a round robin format to determine the last team to join in the semi-finals.

=== Participating Countries ===
Participating Countries (Men)
Host
Malaysia
Group A	Group B	Group C	Group D
Thailand	Malaysia	South Korea	Japan
India	Singapore	Indonesia	Brunei
Germany	France	USA	China
-	-	-	Iran

Participating Countries (Women)
Host
Malaysia
Group A	Group B	Group C
Thailand	Myanmar	Malaysia
Indonesia	Vietnam	Japan
China	South Korea	India

=== Men's results ===
Group A (Men)

Group A
Rank	Country	Games played	Win	Lost	Pts
1	Thailand	2	2	0	4
2	India	2	1	1	2
3	Germany	2	0	2	1

India	2-1	Germany
Thailand	2-0	India
Germany	0-2	Thailand

Group B (Men)

Group B
Rank	Country	Games played	Win	Lost	Pts
1	Malaysia	2	2	0	4
2	Singapore	2	1	1	2
3	France	2	0	2	0

Singapore	2-0	France
Malaysia	2-0	Singapore
France	0-2	Malaysia

Group C (Men)

Group C
Rank	Country	Games played	Win	Lost	Pts
1	South Korea	2	2	0	4
2	Indonesia	2	1	1	2
3	USA	2	0	2	1

Indonesia	2-0	USA
USA	1-2	South Korea
South Korea	2-0	Indonesia

Group D (Men)

Group D
Rank	Country	Games played	Win	Lost	Pts
1	Japan	3	2	1	4
2	Brunei	3	2	1	5
3	China	3	1	2	3
4	Iran	3	1	2	2

Japan	0-2	Brunei
China	0-2	Iran
Brunei	1-2	China
Iran	0-2	Japan
Brunei	2-0	Iran
China	1-2	Japan

Knock-out Rounds (Men)

Quarter-finals
8 Mar
Thailand	2
Indonesia	0
8 Mar
South Korea	2
India	0
8 Mar
Malaysia	2
Japan	0
8 Mar
Brunei	2
Singapore	0

Semi-finals
9 Mar
Thailand	3
South Korea	1
9 Mar
Malaysia	3
Brunei	0

Final
9 Mar
Malaysia	0
Thailand	3
Third place
9 Mar
South Korea	3
Brunei	0

=== Women's results ===
Group A (Women)

Group A
Rank	Country	Games played	Win	Lost	Pts
1	Thailand	2	2	0	4
2	Indonesia	2	1	1	2
3	China	2	0	2	0

China	0-2	Thailand
Thailand	2-0	Indonesia
Indonesia	2-0	China

Group B (Women)

Group B
Rank	Country	Games played	Win	Lost	Pts
1	Myanmar	2	1	1	2
2	Vietnam	2	1	1	2
3	South Korea	2	1	1	2

Vietnam	2-0	Thailand
Myanmar	2-0	South Korea
South Korea	2-0	Vietnam

Group C (Women)

Group C
Rank	Country	Games played	Win	Lost	Pts
1	Malaysia	2	2	0	4
2	Japan	2	1	1	2
3	India	2	0	2	1

Japan	2-1	India
Malaysia	2-0	Japan
India	0-2	Malaysia

Knock-out Rounds (Women)

Semi-finals
8 Mar
Malaysia	3
Myanmar	0
8 Mar
Thailand	3
Indonesia	0

Final
9 Mar
Thailand	3
Malaysia	0
Third place
9 Mar
Myanmar	2
Indonesia	3
