= MITC =

MITC may refer to:

- Malacca International Trade Centre
- Methyl isothiocyanate
- Seattle Youth Symphony Orchestras
- Media Industry Technologist Certification
- Military Intelligence Training Center
