= 2014–15 ISTAF SuperSeries =

- Venue: (Myanmar) Wunna Thekdi Indoor Stadium; (Malaysia) Malacca International Trade Centre; (South Korea) Wolmyeong Sport Complex; (Thailand) Nakhon Pathom Municipality Sport School Stadium
- Location: Naypyitaw, Myanmar; Malacca, Malaysia; Gunsan, South Korea; Nakhon Pathom, Thailand
- Dates: 30 October 2014 – 23 October 2015
- Competitors: 56 teams from 18 nations
- Website: http://istafsuperseries.com

Champion
- Thailand
- Men: Thailand
- Women: Thailand

The 2014–15 ISTAF SuperSeries is the third season of the ISTAF SuperSeries, elite international Sepaktakraw tournament organized by the International Sepaktakraw Federation (ISTAF). The competition consisted of 4 tournaments, which was held individually during 30 October 2014 to 23 November October 2015, in 4 ISTAF membership countries including; Myanmar, Malaysia, South Korea, and the final series was held in the supremacy country in such the sport, Thailand.

The tournament is played in a regu format (3 players go up against 3 players from the opposing team) with 2 substitutes. The teams play up to 21 points. If there is a deuce at 20-20, the winning need to have at least 2 points more than the other in order to take down the first set, or when a team reaches 25 points first. In the final round of series 2 in Malacca, Thailand suffered a shock defeat by Host Malaysia with strong home support backing the Malaysian team, causes Thailand to lose their position for the first time since the inception of the tournament in 2011.

== Tournament Summary ==
=== Series details ===
| Series | Host | Men's event | | | | Women's event | | | |
| Series | Host | Team | Gold | Silver | Bronze | Team | Gold | Silver | Bronze |
|---|---|---|---|---|---|---|---|---|---|
| 1 | (Myanmar) Naypyitaw | 8 | Thailand | Malaysia | Myanmar | 6 | Thailand | Vietnam | Myanmar |
| 2 | (Malaysia) Malacca | 8 | Malaysia | Thailand | South Korea | 6 | Thailand | Vietnam | Myanmar |
| 3 | (South Korea) Gunsan | 8 | Thailand | South Korea | Malaysia | 6 | Thailand | South Korea | Indonesia |
| 4 | (Thailand) Nakhon Pathom | 8 | Thailand | Malaysia | Philippines | 6 | Thailand | Myanmar | South Korea |

=== Medals Tally ===
Men's event
| Rank | Teams | Gold | Silver | Bronze | Total |
|---|---|---|---|---|---|
| 1 | Thailand | 3 | 1 | - | 4 |
| 2 | Malaysia | 1 | 2 | 1 | 4 |
| 3 | South Korea | - | 1 | 1 | 2 |
| 4 | Myanmar | - | - | 1 | 1 |
| 5 | Philippines | - | - | 1 | 1 |

Women's event
| Rank | Teams | Gold | Silver | Bronze | Total |
|---|---|---|---|---|---|
| 1 | Thailand | 4 | - | - | 4 |
| 2 | Vietnam | - | 2 | - | 2 |
| 3 | Myanmar | - | 1 | 2 | 3 |
| 4 | South Korea | - | 1 | 1 | 2 |
| 5 | Indonesia | - | - | 1 | 1 |

=== Ranking ===
Tournament ranking
| Rank | Men | | Women | |
| Rank | Country | Points | Country | Points |
|---|---|---|---|---|
| 1st place, gold medalist(s) | Thailand | 980 | Thailand | 1000 |
| 2nd place, silver medalist(s) | Malaysia | 920 | Vietnam | 860 |
| 3rd place, bronze medalist(s) | Myanmar; Singapore; South Korea | 770 | Malaysia | 760 |
| 4. | Japan | 710 | Japan | 720 |
| 5. | Indonesia | 560 | Myanmar | 650 |
| 6. | China | 490 | South Korea | 640 |
| 7. | Philippines | 210 | Indonesia | 410 |
| 8. | India | 180 | —N/a | |
Note: Ranking Index

== ISS Series 1 Myanmar ==
2014–15 ISS Series 1 Myanmar
- Genre: Sport event
- Begins: October 30, 2014
- Ends: November 2, 2014
- Venue: Wunna Thekdi Indoor Stadium
- Locations: Naypyitaw, Myanmar
- Participants: Men: 8 teams; Women: 6 teams
- Organiser: International Sepaktakraw Federation
- Sponsor: Myanmar Olympic Committee; Myanmar Sepaktakraw Federation; Marathon (Thailand) Co., Ltd.; Warrix Sports

The ISS Series 1 Myanmar is the first tournament of 2014–15 ISTAF SuperSeries, which was held in Naypyitaw, Myanmar at the Wunna Thekdi Stadium from 30 October to 2 November 2014. The competition lasted for a period of 4 days, featuring the top 8 Men’s teams and 6 Women’s teams, according to ISTAF World Ranking. In this new season, a live stream feature was also introduced and accessible by the official organizer website. The event was organized by the International Sepaktakraw Federation (ISTAF) and Asia Sports Ventures (ASV), the ISTAF’s exclusive global commercial and developmental partner, with the support of host partners, the Myanmar Ministry of Sports and Youth Affairs and the Myanmar Sepaktakraw Federation (MSTAF).

The winner of the tournament in both men's and women's is Thailand, the first runner-up in men's race is Malaysia while Vietnam was placed as second in the women's events. the host country, Myanmar, finished this first tournament with third place for both categories.

=== Team Allocation ===
The first round, or group stage, saw 8 men's and 6 women's teams divided equally into 2 groups in each category. Each group featured a round-robin of games, with each team playing against every other team in their group once. The group stage result is based on points accumulated, the top 2 teams from each group advanced to the semi-finals. The winner from Group A will go up against the runner-up from Group B, vice versa. Winners from the semi-finals will proceed to the finals, while the losing teams will move to the third/fourth placement match.

=== Participating Countries ===
Men's event
| Host | Myanmar |
| Group A | Group B |
| Japan | China |
| Singapore | Indonesia |
| South Korea | Thailand |
| Malaysia | Myanmar |

Women's event
| Host | Myanmar |
| Group A | Group B |
| Vietnam | Myanmar |
| Indonesia | Thailand |
| Malaysia | Japan |

=== Men's results ===
Group A (Men)

Group A
| Rank | Country | Games played | Win | Lost | Pts |
|---|---|---|---|---|---|
| 1 | Malaysia | 3 | 3 | 0 | 6 |
| 2 | Singapore | 3 | 2 | 1 | 4 |
| 3 | Japan | 3 | 1 | 2 | 2 |
| 4 | South Korea | 3 | 0 | 3 | 1 |

Group B (Men)

Group B
| Rank | Country | Games played | Win | Lost | Pts |
|---|---|---|---|---|---|
| 1 | Thailand | 3 | 3 | 0 | 6 |
| 2 | Myanmar | 3 | 2 | 1 | 4 |
| 3 | Indonesia | 3 | 1 | 2 | 3 |
| 4 | China | 3 | 0 | 3 | 1 |

Knock-out Rounds (Men)

Semi-finals
1 Nov
Malaysia | 2
Myanmar | 0
1 Nov
Thailand | 2
Singapore | 0

Final
2 Nov
Thailand | 2
Malaysia | 1
Third place
2 Nov
Myanmar | 2
Singapore | 0

Semifinal round

| 1 Nov; 18:00 | Malaysia | 2–0 | Myanmar | Wunna Thekdi Indoor Stadium, Naypyitaw |
| 1 Nov; 18:00 | (21–11, 21–14); P2 Report | | | Wunna Thekdi Indoor Stadium, Naypyitaw |

| 1 Nov; 19:00 | Thailand | 2–0 | Singapore | Wunna Thekdi Indoor Stadium, Naypyitaw |
| 1 Nov; 19:00 | (21–11, 21–9); P2 Report | | | Wunna Thekdi Indoor Stadium, Naypyitaw |

3rd/4th playoff

| 2 Nov; 18:00 | Myanmar | 2–0 | Singapore | Wunna Thekdi Indoor Stadium, Naypyitaw |
| 2 Nov; 18:00 | (21–18, 21–13); P2 Report | | | Wunna Thekdi Indoor Stadium, Naypyitaw |

Final round

| 2 Nov; 19:00 | Malaysia | 1–2 | Thailand | Wunna Thekdi Indoor Stadium, Naypyitaw |
| 2 Nov; 19:00 | (22–20, 18–21, 21–23); P2 Report | | | Wunna Thekdi Indoor Stadium, Naypyitaw |

=== Women's Results ===
Group A (Women)

Group A
| Rank | Country | Games played | Win | Lost | Pts |
|---|---|---|---|---|---|
| 1 | Vietnam | 2 | 2 | 0 | 4 |
| 2 | Indonesia | 2 | 1 | 1 | 3 |
| 3 | Malaysia | 2 | 0 | 2 | 0 |

Group B (Women)

Group B
| Rank | Country | Games played | Win | Lost | Pts |
|---|---|---|---|---|---|
| 1 | Thailand | 2 | 2 | 0 | 4 |
| 2 | Myanmar | 2 | 1 | 1 | 3 |
| 3 | Japan | 2 | 0 | 2 | 0 |

Knock-out Rounds (Women)

Semi-finals
1 Nov
Vietnam | 2
Myanmar | 1
1 Nov
Thailand | 2
Indonesia | 0

Final
2 Nov
Thailand | 2
Vietnam | 0
Third place
2 Nov
Myanmar | 2
Indonesia | 1

3rd/4th playoff

| 2 Nov; 17:00 | Indonesia | 1–2 | Myanmar | Wunna Thekdi Indoor Stadium, Naypyitaw |
| 2 Nov; 17:00 | (19–21, 24–22, 16–21); P2 Report | | | Wunna Thekdi Indoor Stadium, Naypyitaw |

Final round

| 2 Nov; 18:00 | Thailand | 2–0 | Vietnam | Wunna Thekdi Indoor Stadium, Naypyitaw |
| 2 Nov; 18:00 | (21–18, 21–13); P2 Report | | | Wunna Thekdi Indoor Stadium, Naypyitaw |

== ISS Series 2 Malaysia ==
2014–15 ISS Series 2 Malaysia
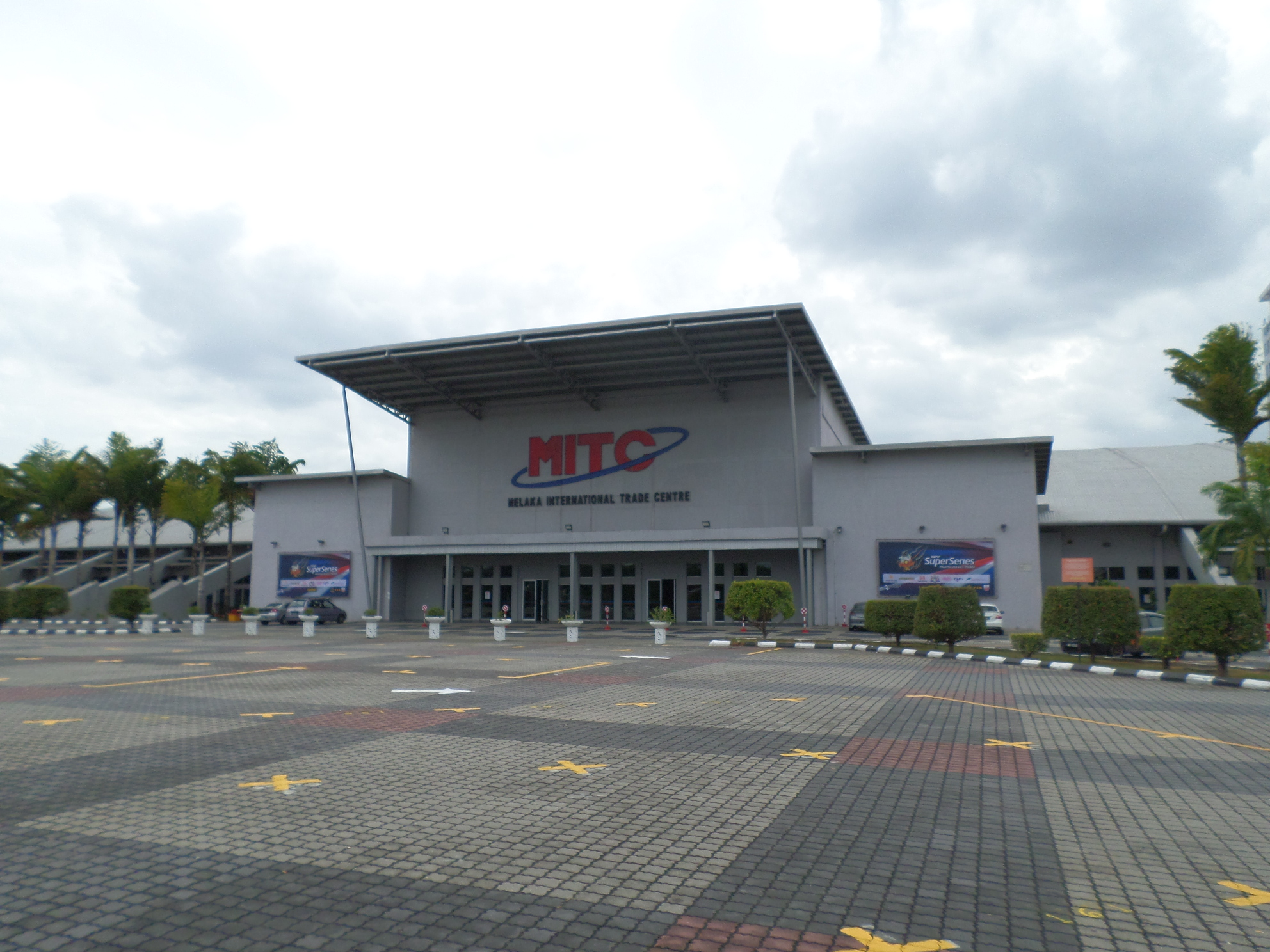
- Malacca International Trade Centre, the venue of the tournament.
- Genre: Sport event
- Begins: February 5, 2015
- Ends: February 8, 2015
- Venue: Malacca International Trade Centre
- Locations: Malacca, Malaysia
- Participants: Men: 8 teams; Women: 6 teams
- Organiser: International Sepaktakraw Federation
- Sponsor: Marathon (Thailand) Co., Ltd.; Warrix Sports

The 2014–15 ISS Series 2 Malaysia is the second tournament of the third season of the ISTAF SuperSeries, which was held in Malacca International Trade Centre in Malaysia from 5 February to 8 February 2015 with a total of 14 teams from 9 countries return for another round of battle for ISTAF world ranking points. In the finals, Thailand suffered a shock defeat by Host Malaysia with strong home support backing the Malaysian team.

The event winner for the men’s teams is the host, Malaysia, followed up by the runner-up Thailand and second runner-up South Korea. Meanwhile, in the women's events, Thailand the strong favorite secured their first of the race, followed by runner-up Vietnam and second runner-up Myanmar.

=== Team Allocation ===
The first round, or group stage, saw 8 men's and 6 women's teams divided equally into 2 groups in each category. Each group featured a round-robin of games, with each team playing against every other team in their group once. The group stage result is based on points accumulated, the top 2 teams from each group advanced to the semi-finals. The winner from Group A will go up against the runner-up from Group B, vice versa. Winners from the semi-finals will proceed to the finals, while the losing teams will move to the third/fourth placement match.

=== Participating Countries ===
Men's event
| Host | Malaysia |
| Group A | Group B |
| Thailand | Malaysia |
| South Korea | Singapore |
| Japan | China |
| Myanmar | Indonesia |

Women's event
| Host | Malaysia |
| Group A | Group B |
| Malaysia | Thailand |
| Vietnam | Myanmar |
| South Korea | Japan |

=== Men's results ===
Group A (Men)

Group A
| Rank | Country | Games played | Win | Lost | Pts |
|---|---|---|---|---|---|
| 1 | Thailand | 3 | 3 | 0 | 6 |
| 2 | South Korea | 3 | 2 | 1 | 4 |
| 3 | Myanmar | 3 | 1 | 2 | 2 |
| 4 | Japan | 3 | 0 | 3 | 2 |

Group B (Men)

Group B
| Rank | Country | Games played | Win | Lost | Pts |
|---|---|---|---|---|---|
| 1 | Malaysia | 3 | 3 | 0 | 6 |
| 2 | Singapore | 3 | 2 | 1 | 4 |
| 3 | Indonesia | 3 | 1 | 2 | 3 |
| 4 | China | 3 | 0 | 3 | 0 |

Knock-out Rounds (Men)

Semi-finals
7 Feb
Thailand | 2
Singapore | 0
7 Feb
Malaysia | 2
South Korea | 0

Final
8 Feb
Malaysia | 2
Thailand | 0
Third place
8 Feb
South Korea | 2
Singapore | 0

=== Women's Results ===
Group A (Women)

Group A
| Rank | Country | Games played | Win | Lost | Pts |
|---|---|---|---|---|---|
| 1 | South Korea | 2 | 2 | 0 | 4 |
| 2 | Vietnam | 2 | 1 | 1 | 3 |
| 3 | Malaysia | 2 | 0 | 2 | 3 |

Group B (Women)

Group B
| Rank | Country | Games played | Win | Lost | Pts |
|---|---|---|---|---|---|
| 1 | Myanmar | 2 | 2 | 0 | 4 |
| 2 | Thailand | 2 | 1 | 1 | 3 |
| 3 | Japan | 2 | 0 | 2 | 0 |

Knock-out Rounds (Women)

Semi-finals
7 Feb
Vietnam | 2
Myanmar | 1
7 Feb
Thailand | 2
South Korea | 0

Final
8 Feb
Thailand | 2
Vietnam | 0
Third place
8 Feb
Myanmar | 2
South Korea | 0

== ISS Series 3 South Korea ==
2014–15 ISS Series 3 South Korea
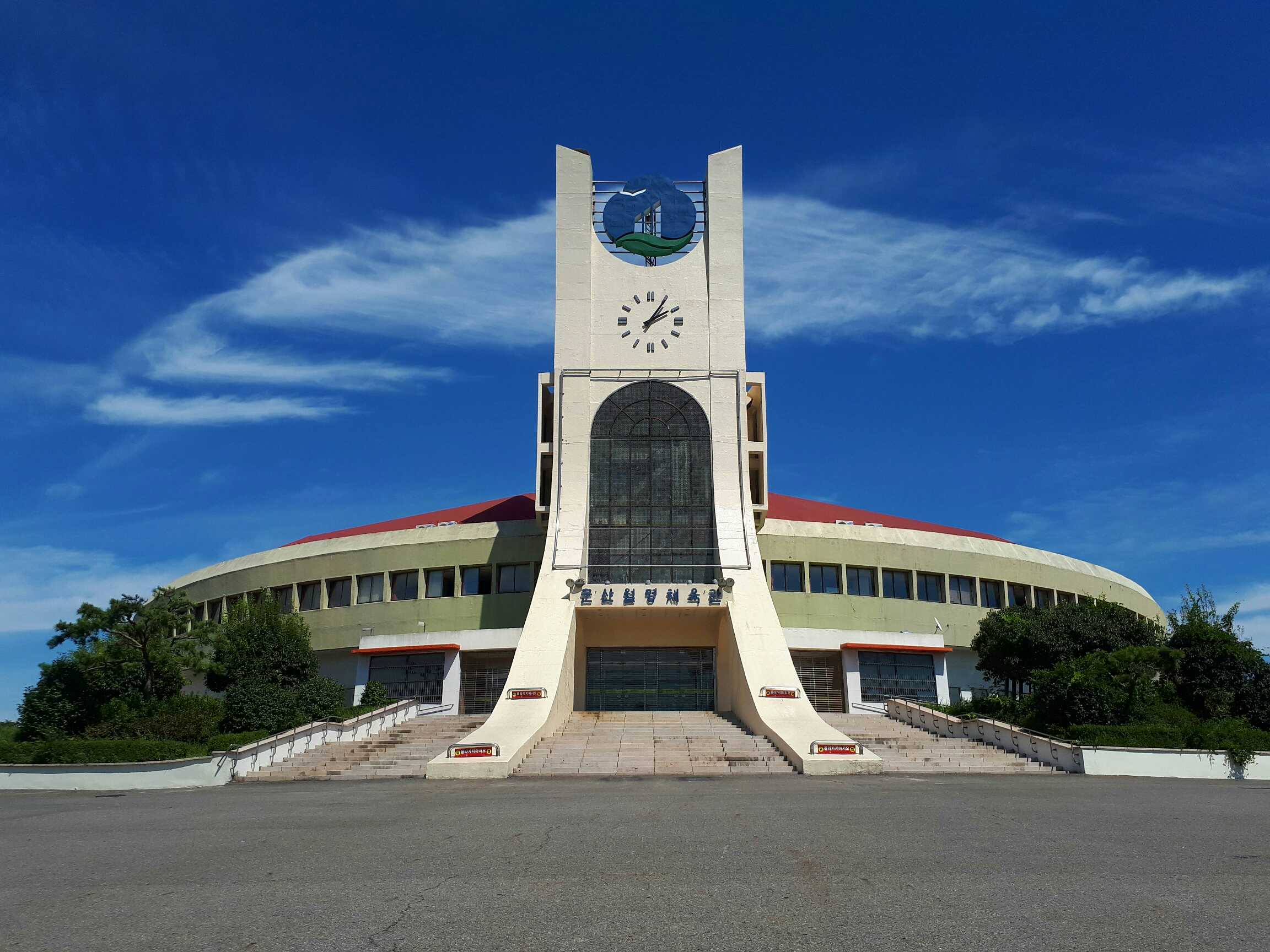
- Wolmyeong Sports Complex, the venue of the tournament.
- Genre: Sport event
- Begins: April 23, 2015
- Ends: April 26, 2015
- Venue: Wolmyeong Sports Complex
- Locations: Gunsan, South Korea
- Participants: Men: 8 teams; Women: 6 teams
- Organiser: International Sepaktakraw Federation
- Sponsor: Marathon (Thailand) Co., Ltd.; Warrix Sports

The '2014–15 ISS Series 3 South Korea is the third tournament of the 2014–15 ISTAF SUperSeries, held in the Wolmyeong Sports Complex in the city of Gunsan in South Korea from 23 April to 26 April 2015. The host countries, Sost Korea put up a good showing on their home ground and proceed into the finals against Thailand for both Men’s and Women’s. Sepaktakraw, with its history deep in South East Asian roots, has proven that the sport is extending beyond the region boundaries and into other parts of Asia.

The winner of the tournament for both men's and women's events is Thailand, joined by runner-up South Korea in both, while Malaysia and Indonesia finished the event with the second runner-up in men's and women's events, respectively.

=== Team Allocation ===
Like all previous series of the tournament, The first round, or group stage, saw 8 men's and 6 women's teams equally divided into 2 groups for each category. Each group featured a round-robin of games, with each team playing against every other team in their group once. The group stage result is based on points accumulated, the top 2 teams from each group advanced to the semi-finals. The winner from Group A will go up against the runner-up from Group B, vice versa. Winners from the semi-finals will proceed to the finals, while the losing teams will move to the third/fourth placement match.

=== Participating Countries ===
Men's event
| Host | South Korea |
| Group A | Group B |
| Thailand | Malaysia |
| South Korea | Myanmar |
| Japan | Singapore |
| Indonesia | China |

Women's event
| Host | South Korea |
| Group A | Group B |
| Thailand | Vietnam |
| South Korea | Indonesia |
| Malaysia | Japan |

=== Men's results ===
Group A (Men)

Group A
| Rank | Country | Games played | Win | Lost | Pts |
|---|---|---|---|---|---|
| 1 | Thailand | 3 | 3 | 0 | 6 |
| 2 | South Korea | 3 | 2 | 1 | 4 |
| 3 | Indonesia | 3 | 1 | 2 | 2 |
| 4 | Japan | 3 | 0 | 3 | 0 |

Group B (Men)

Group B
| Rank | Country | Games played | Win | Lost | Pts |
|---|---|---|---|---|---|
| 1 | Malaysia | 3 | 2 | 1 | 4 |
| 2 | Singapore | 3 | 2 | 1 | 4 |
| 3 | Myanmar | 3 | 1 | 2 | 4 |
| 4 | China | 3 | 0 | 3 | 0 |

Knock-out Rounds (Men)

Semi-finals
25 Apr
Thailand | 2
Singapore | 0
25 Apr
Korea | 2
Malaysia | 0

Final
26 Apr
Thailand | 2
South Korea | 0
Third place
26 Apr
Malaysia | 2
Singapore | 0

=== Women's Results ===
Group A (Women)

Group A
| Rank | Country | Games played | Win | Lost | Pts |
|---|---|---|---|---|---|
| 1 | Thailand | 2 | 2 | 0 | 4 |
| 2 | South Korea | 2 | 1 | 1 | 2 |
| 3 | Malaysia | 2 | 0 | 2 | 0 |

Group B (Women)

Group B
| Rank | Country | Games played | Win | Lost | Pts |
|---|---|---|---|---|---|
| 1 | Vietnam | 2 | 2 | 0 | 4 |
| 2 | Indonesia | 2 | 1 | 1 | 3 |
| 3 | Japan | 2 | 0 | 2 | 0 |

Knock-out Rounds (Women)

Semi-finals
25 Apr
South Korea | 2
Vietnam | 0
25 Apr
Thailand | 2
Indonesia | 0

Final
26 Apr
Thailand | 2
Korea | 0
Third place
26 Apr
Indonesia | 2
Vietnam | 0

== ISS Final Series Thailand ==
2014–15 ISS Final Series Thailand
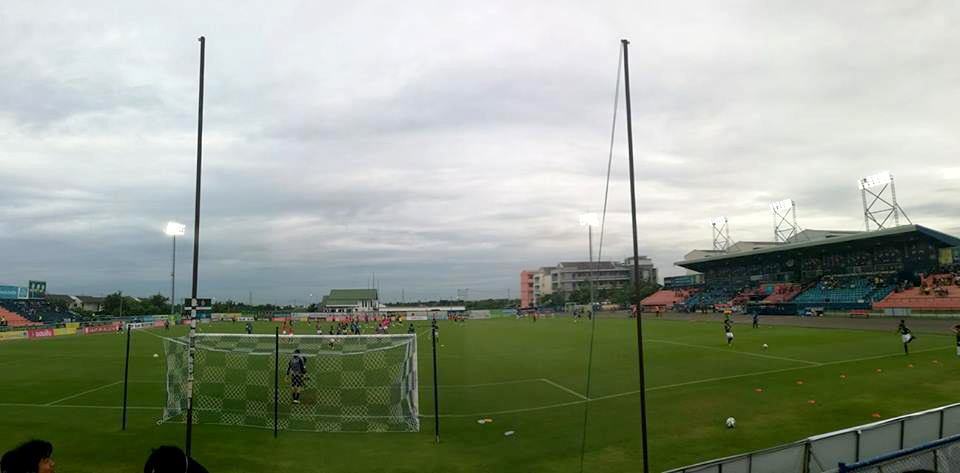
- Nakhon Pathom Municipality Sport Complex, the venue of the tournament.
- Genre: Sport event
- Begins: October 20, 2015
- Ends: October 23, 2015
- Venue: Nakhon Pathom Municipality Sport Complex
- Locations: Nakhon Pathom, Thailand
- Participants: Men: 8 teams; Women: 6 teams
- Organiser: International Sepaktakraw Federation
- Sponsor: Takraw Association of Thailand; Marathon (Thailand) Co., Ltd.; Warrix Sports

The '2014–15 ISTAF Final Series Thailand is the last tournament of the third season of ISTAF SuperSeries, held Nakhon Pathom in Central Thailand at Nakhon Pathom Municipality Sports Complex from 20 October to 23 October 2015. Thailand not only hosted the Grand Finale on their home ground, their both the men’s and women’s teams emerged as winners for this finals tournament. The runner up for the men’s tournament was taken up by Malaysia with the Philippines following close behind as the second runner up. The women’s tournament saw Myanmar as the runner up followed by the second runner-up, South Korea.

=== Team Allocation ===
Like all previous series of the tournament, The first round, or group stage, saw 8 men's and 6 women's teams equally divided into 2 groups for each category. Each group featured a round-robin of games, with each team playing against every other team in their group once. The group stage result is based on points accumulated, the top 2 teams from each group advanced to the semi-finals. The winner from Group A will go up against the runner-up from Group B, vice versa. Winners from the semi-finals will proceed to the finals, while the losing teams will move to the third/fourth placement match.

=== Participating Countries ===
Men's event
| Host | Thailand |
| Group A | Group B |
| Thailand | Japan |
| Myanmar | Malaysia |
| Philippines | Singapore |
| India | South Korea |

Women's event
| Host | Thailand |
| Group A | Group B |
| Vietnam | Malaysia |
| Japan | Thailand |
| South Korea | Myanmar |

=== Men's results ===
Group A (Men)

Group A
| Rank | Country | Games played | Win | Lost | Pts |
|---|---|---|---|---|---|
| 1 | Thailand | 3 | 3 | 0 | 6 |
| 2 | Philippines | 3 | 2 | 1 | 4 |
| 3 | Myanmar | 3 | 1 | 2 | 2 |
| 4 | India | 3 | 0 | 3 | 0 |

Group B (Men)

Group B
| Rank | Country | Games played | Win | Lost | Pts |
|---|---|---|---|---|---|
| 1 | Malaysia | 3 | 3 | 0 | 6 |
| 2 | Japan | 3 | 2 | 1 | 4 |
| 3 | Singapore | 3 | 1 | 2 | 2 |
| 4 | South Korea | 3 | 0 | 3 | 0 |

Knock-out Rounds (Men)

Semi-finals
22 Oct
Thailand | 2
Japan | 0
22 Oct
Philippines | 1
Malaysia | 2

Final
23 Oct
Thailand | 2
Malaysia | 0
Third place
23 Oct
Philippines | 2
Japan | 0

=== Women's Results ===
Group A (Women)

Group A
| Rank | Country | Games played | Win | Lost | Pts |
|---|---|---|---|---|---|
| 1 | Vietnam | 2 | 2 | 0 | 4 |
| 2 | South Korea | 2 | 1 | 1 | 2 |
| 3 | Japan | 2 | 0 | 2 | 0 |

Group B (Women)

Group B
| Rank | Country | Games played | Win | Lost | Pts |
|---|---|---|---|---|---|
| 1 | Thailand | 2 | 2 | 0 | 4 |
| 2 | Myanmar | 2 | 1 | 1 | 2 |
| 3 | Malaysia | 2 | 0 | 2 | 0 |

Knock-out Rounds (Women)

Semi-finals
22 Oct
Thailand | 2
South Korea | 0
22 Oct
Myanmar | 2
Vietnam | 0

Final
23 Oct
Thailand | 2
Myanmar | 0
Third place
23 Oct
South Korea | 2
Vietnam | 0
