= Wolmyeong Baseball Stadium =

Baseball stadium in Gunsan, South Korea

Wolmyeong Baseball Stadium 월명종합경기장 야구장
- Interactive map of Wolmyeong Baseball Stadium 월명종합경기장 야구장
- Location: 281 Beon yeong-ro, Gaejeong-dong, Gunsan, South Korea
- Coordinates: 35°57′57.7″N 126°44′52.9″E
- Owner: City of Gunsan
- Operator: Kia Tigers
- Capacity: 12,000
- Surface: Artificial turf
- Field size: Left Field – 98 metres (322 ft) Right Field – 98 metres (322 ft) Center Field – 122 metres (400 ft)

Construction
- Opened: May 1989

Tenants
- Ssangbangwool Raiders (KBO) (1990–1999); Kia Tigers (KBO) (2001-2013)

Wolmyeong Baseball Stadium is a baseball stadium in Gunsan, South Korea.

== See also ==
- Wolmyeong Sports Complex
