= 2011–12 ISTAF SuperSeries =

- Venue: (Thailand) Fashion Island; (Indonesia) Palembang Sport and Convention Center; (Singapore) ITE College East
- Location: Bangkok, Thailand; Palembang, Indonesia; East Coast GRC, Singapore
- Dates: 8 September 2011 – 1 July 2012
- Competitors: 70 teams from 18 nations
- Website: http://istafsuperseries.com

Champion
- Thailand
- Men: Thailand
- Women: Thailand

The debut season of the ISTAF SuperSeries commenced on 8 September 2011 to 1 July 2012 with 4 SuperSeries tournaments. The ISTAF SuperSeries is an international tournament by the International Sepaktakraw Federation (ISTAF) to bring the sport of Sepaktakraw to the international audience.

The first SuperSeries of the season was held in Bangkok, Thailand, followed by Palembang, Indonesia, and Singapore before finishing back in Bangkok.

The overall winner of the first ISTAF SuperSeries season for men and women was Thailand. Both teams from Thailand swept through all the gold medals in the individual ISTAF SuperSeries tournament. The battle for second-place was more interesting for both the men and women's competition. The ISTAF's Super Series men's editions saw Malaysia and Indonesia constantly fighting for the runner up spot, both coming in at second place twice. The same situation plays out in the women's edition as well, with South Korea and Vietnam achieving the runner-up spot twice in the season.

== Tournament Summary ==
Tournament ranking
| Rank | Men | | Women | |
| Rank | Country | Points | Country | Points |
|---|---|---|---|---|
| 1st place, gold medalist(s) | Thailand | 1000 | Thailand | 1000 |
| 2nd place, silver medalist(s) | Malaysia; South Korea | 830 | Vietnam | 880 |
| 3rd place, bronze medalist(s) | Japan | 750 | Malaysia | 790 |
| 4. | Singapore | 700 | Japan | 750 |
| 5. | Indonesia | 670 | South Korea | 660 |
| 6. | Brunei | 650 | Indonesia | 410 |
| 7. | United States | 580 | China | 370 |
| 8. | Philippines | 530 | India | 340 |
| 9. | India | 470 | Myanmar | 170 |
| 10. | Myanmar | 170 | —N/a | |
| 11. | Chinese Taipei | 160 | —N/a | |
| 12. | Vietnam | 150 | —N/a | |
| 13. | Germany | 140 | —N/a | |
| 14. | Laos | 130 | —N/a | |
Note: Ranking Index

=== Series details ===
| Series | Host | Men's event | | | | Women's event | | | |
| Series | Host | Team | Gold | Silver | Bronze | Team | Gold | Silver | Bronze |
|---|---|---|---|---|---|---|---|---|---|
| 1 | (Thailand) Bangkok | 12 | Thailand | Indonesia | South Korea | 8 | Thailand | South Korea | Vietnam |
| 2 | (Indonesia) Palembang | 9 | Thailand | Malaysia | Indonesia | 6 | Thailand | South Korea | Vietnam |
| 3 | Singapore | 10 | Thailand | Indonesia | South Korea | 6 | Thailand | Vietnam | Indonesia |
| 4 | (Thailand) Bangkok | 12 | Thailand | Malaysia | South Korea | 7 | Thailand | Vietnam | Malaysia |

=== Medals Tally ===
Men's event
| Rank | Teams | Gold | Silver | Bronze | Total |
|---|---|---|---|---|---|
| 1 | Thailand | 4 | - | - | 4 |
| 2 | Indonesia | - | 2 | 1 | 3 |
| 3 | Malaysia | - | 2 | - | 2 |
| 4 | South Korea | - | - | 3 | 3 |

Women's event
| Rank | Teams | Gold | Silver | Bronze | Total |
|---|---|---|---|---|---|
| 1 | Thailand | 4 | - | - | 4 |
| 2 | Vietnam | - | 2 | 2 | 4 |
| 3 | South Korea | - | 2 | - | 2 |
| 4 | Indonesia | - | - | 1 | 1 |
| 4 | Malaysia | - | - | 1 | 1 |

== ISS Series 1 Thailand ==
2011–12 ISS Series 1 Thailand
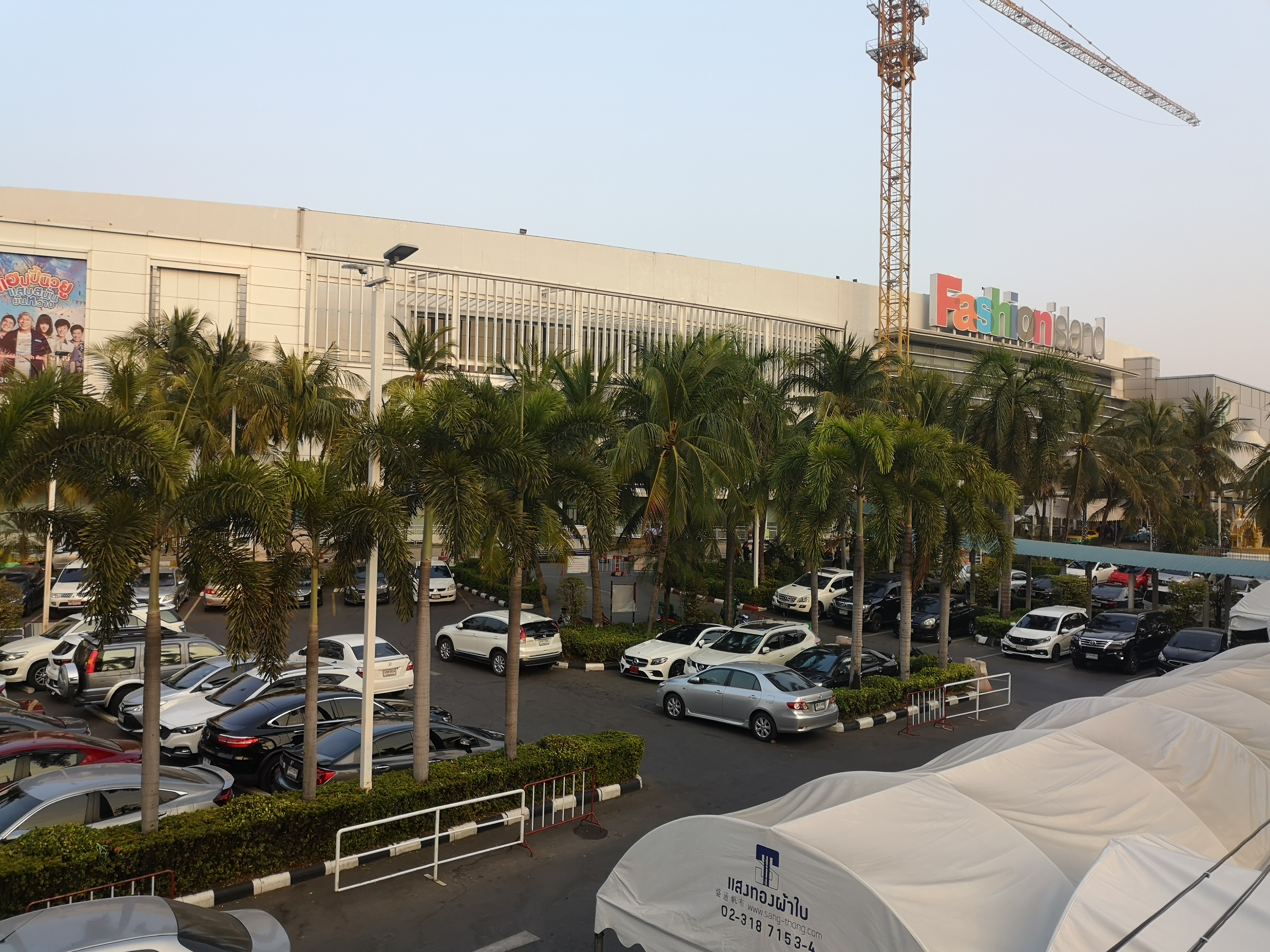
- Fashion Island, the venue of the tournament.
- Genre: Sport event
- Begins: September 8, 2011
- Ends: September 11, 2011
- Venue: Fashion Island
- Locations: Bangkok, Thailand
- Participants: Men: 12 teams; Women: 8 teams
- Organiser: International Sepaktakraw Federation
- Sponsor: Marathon (Thailand) Co., Ltd.

The first series of ISS 2011–12 was held in Fashion Island, Bangkok in Thailand from 8 September 2011 to 11 September 2011. This edition marks a first by ISTAF to create an elite annual tournament to showcase the sport. The event witnessed the participation of 18 international teams, 58 male and 39 women players. The longest match in this ISS occurred in Indonesia's victory over Malaysia (3-2) in the men's quarter-finals match, spanning a length of 1 hour and 27 minutes.

Drawing from the support of their home crowd in Bangkok, the Thailand men's national men team joined from the playoff stage and showed their class by winning Singapore in quarter-finals, Japan in semi-finals as well as Indonesia in the final round, in straight sets to clinch the champion's spot. Losing finalist – Indonesia came in second while South Korea defeated Japan to secure the men's bronze medal. Meanwhile, the host country's female counterparts defeated semi-finalist Vietnam and the finalist South Korea in straight sets. Vietnam rallied from its semi-final defeat to eventual champion, Thailand, and secure third at the expense of Japan. Japan did come close to upsetting them, however, losing the second set and third set by close margins.

The winner of the men's event in this first-ever series is Thailand, the runner-up is Indonesia and the second runner-up is South Korea, while the winner of the women's event also is Thailand, the runner-up is South Korea and the second runner-up is Vietnam.

=== Team Allocation ===
The first round, or group stage, saw 11 men's teams divided into 4 groups of 3. Each group featured a round-robin of games, while in the group stage of women's event, saw only 7 teams which divided into 2 groups. In both categories, each team playing against every other team in their group once, the group stage result is based on points accumulated, the top 2 teams from each group advanced to the quarter-finals or playoff stage. The host nation also automatically advances to the playoff stage.

=== Participating Countries ===
Men's event
| Host | Thailand | | |
| Group A | Group B | Group C | Group D |
| India | South Korea | Brunei | Philippines |
| Japan | Laos | Indonesia | Singapore |
| —N/a | Malaysia | Myanmar | USA |

Women's event
| Host | Thailand |
| Group A | Group B |
| Japan | China |
| Malaysia | India |
| Myanmar | South Korea |
| —N/a | Vietnam |

=== Men's results ===
Group A (Men)

Group A
| Rank | Country | Games played | Win | Lost | Pts |
|---|---|---|---|---|---|
| 1 | Japan | 2 | 2 | 0 | 6 |
| 2 | India | 2 | 0 | 2 | 1 |

8 September 2011
| India | 1-3 | Japan |
9 September 2011
| Japan | 3-0 | India |

Group B (Men)

Group B
| Rank | Country | Games played | Win | Lost | Pts |
|---|---|---|---|---|---|
| 1 | Malaysia | 2 | 2 | 0 | 6 |
| 2 | South Korea | 2 | 1 | 1 | 5 |
| 3 | Laos | 2 | 0 | 2 | 1 |

8 September 2011
| Malaysia | 3-2 | South Korea |
| Laos | 0-3 | Malaysia |
9 September 2011
| South Korea | 3-1 | Laos |

Group C (Men)

Group C
| Rank | Country | Games played | Win | Lost | Pts |
|---|---|---|---|---|---|
| 1 | Myanmar | 2 | 2 | 0 | 6 |
| 2 | Indonesia | 2 | 1 | 1 | 4 |
| 3 | Brunei | 2 | 0 | 2 | 2 |

8 September 2011
| Myanmar | 3-1 | Indonesia |
| Indonesia | 3-1 | Brunei |
9 September 2011
| Brunei | 1-3 | Myanmar |

Group D (Men)

Group D
| Rank | Country | Games played | Win | Lost | Pts |
|---|---|---|---|---|---|
| 1 | Philippines | 2 | 2 | 0 | 6 |
| 2 | Singapore | 2 | 1 | 1 | 3 |
| 3 | USA | 2 | 0 | 2 | 0 |

8 September 2011
| Singapore | 3-0 | USA |
| USA | 0-3 | Philippines |
9 September 2011
| Philippines | 3-0 | Singapore |

Knock-out Rounds (Men)

Quarter-finals
10 Sep
South Korea | 3
Myanmar | 1
10 Sep
Malaysia | 2
Indonesia | 3
10 Sep
Thailand | 3
Singapore | 0
10 Sep
Japan | 3
Philippines | 0

Semi-finals
10 Sep
South Korea | 1
Indonesia | 3
10 Sep
Thailand | 3
Japan | 0

Final
11 Sep
Indonesia | 0
Thailand | 3
Third place
11 Sep
South Korea | 3
Japan | 1

5th-8th Ranking

| Pos | Team | Pld | W | L | Pts | SW | SL | SR | SPW | SPL | SPR | Placing |
|---|---|---|---|---|---|---|---|---|---|---|---|---|
| 1 | Philippines | 3 | 2 | 1 | 6 | 6 | 3 | 2.000 | 125 | 113 | 1.106 | 5th |
| 2 | Malaysia | 3 | 2 | 1 | 7 | 8 | 5 | 1.600 | 175 | 151 | 1.159 | 6th |
| 3 | Myanmar | 3 | 2 | 1 | 7 | 7 | 5 | 1.400 | 156 | 135 | 1.156 | 7th |
| 4 | Singapore | 3 | 1 | 2 | 3 | 3 | 6 | 0.500 | 95 | 112 | 0.848 | 8th |

Source: "ISS Thailand 2011 - Day 1 - Tournament Results". International Sepaktakraw Federation (in Thai). June 4, 2016. Archived from the original on 2016-06-04.

9th-12th Ranking

| Pos | Team | Pld | W | L | Pts | SW | SL | SR | SPW | SPL | SPR | Placing |
|---|---|---|---|---|---|---|---|---|---|---|---|---|
| 1 | Brunei | 2 | 0 | 2 | 2 | 2 | 6 | 0.333 | 43 | 84 | 0.512 | 9th |
| 2 | India | 2 | 0 | 2 | 1 | 1 | 6 | 0.167 | 71 | 101 | 0.703 | 10th |
| 3 | Laos | 2 | 0 | 2 | 1 | 1 | 6 | 0.167 | 64 | 106 | 0.604 | 11th |
| 4 | United States | 2 | 0 | 2 | 0 | 0 | 6 | 0.000 | 55 | 90 | 0.611 | 12th |

Source: "ISS Thailand 2011 - Day 1 - Tournament Results". International Sepaktakraw Federation (in Thai). June 4, 2016. Archived from the original on 2016-06-04.

=== Women's Results ===
Group A (Women)

Group A
| Rank | Country | Games played | Win | Lost | Pts |
|---|---|---|---|---|---|
| 1 | Japan | 2 | 2 | 0 | 6 |
| 2 | Myanmar | 2 | 1 | 1 | 4 |
| 3 | Malaysia | 2 | 0 | 2 | 4 |

8 September 2011
| Malaysia | 2-3 | Japan |
9 September 2011
| Myanmar | 3-2 | Malaysia |
| Japan | 3-1 | Myanmar |

Group B (Women)

Group B
| Rank | Country | Games played | Win | Lost | Pts |
|---|---|---|---|---|---|
| 1 | South Korea | 3 | 3 | 0 | 9 |
| 2 | Vietnam | 3 | 2 | 1 | 6 |
| 3 | China | 3 | 1 | 2 | 5 |
| 4 | India | 3 | 0 | 3 | 0 |

8 September 2011
| Vietnam | 0-3 | South Korea |
| India | 0-3 | China |
| China | 0-3 | Vietnam |
9 September 2011
| South Korea | 3-2 | China |
| Vietnam | 3-0 | India |
| South Korea | 3-0 | India |

Knock-out Rounds (Women)

Semi-finals
10 Sep
South Korea | 3
Japan | 0
10 Sep
Thailand | 3
Vietnam | 0

Final
11 Sep
South Korea | 0
Thailand | 3
Third place
11 Sep
Japan | 0
Vietnam | 3

5th-8th Ranking

| Pos | Team | Pld | W | L | Pts | SW | SL | SR | SPW | SPL | SPR | Placing |
|---|---|---|---|---|---|---|---|---|---|---|---|---|
| 1 | Malaysia | 2 | 0 | 2 | 4 | 5 | 5 | 1.000 | 175 | 151 | 1.159 | 5th |
| 2 | China | 3 | 1 | 2 | 5 | 5 | 6 | 0.833 | 124 | 150 | 0.827 | 6th |
| 3 | Myanmar | 2 | 0 | 2 | 4 | 4 | 5 | 0.800 | 116 | 117 | 0.991 | 7th |
| 4 | India | 3 | 0 | 3 | 0 | 0 | 9 | 0.000 | 74 | 135 | 0.548 | 8th |

Source: "ISS Thailand 2011 - Day 1 - Tournament Results". International Sepaktakraw Federation (in Thai). June 4, 2016. Archived from the original on 2016-06-04.

== ISS Series 2 Indonesia ==
2011–12 ISS Series 2 Indonesia
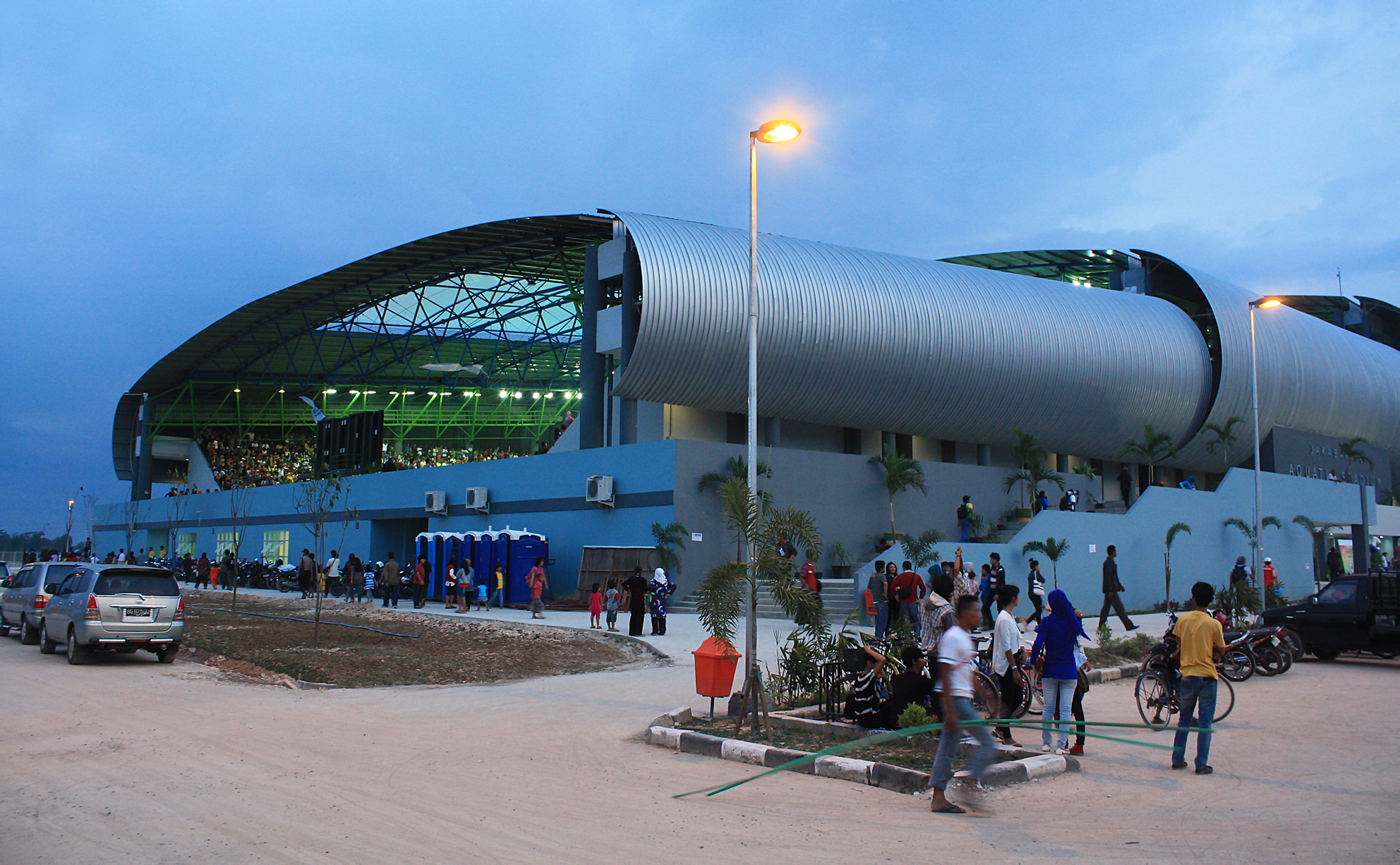
- Palembang Sport and Convention Center, the venue of the tournament.
- Genre: Sport event
- Begins: February 23, 2012
- Ends: February 26, 2012
- Venue: Palembang Sport and Convention Center
- Locations: Palembang, Indonesia
- Participants: Men: 9 teams; Women: 6 teams
- Organiser: International Sepaktakraw Federation
- Sponsor: Marathon (Thailand) Co., Ltd.

The second series of the 2011–12 ISS was held in Palembang Sport and Convention Center, Palembang in Indonesia from 23 February 2012 to 26 February 2012. This edition saw the first appearance of Chinese Taipei into the men's tournament as well as Indonesia's woman national team. However, the second edition had a reduction from 12 to 9 teams in the men's tournament and 7 to 6 teams for the women's. Thailand men's national team continued its winning streak to 8 matches, not dropping any of the 18 sets played during the process. They eventually won the ISS Series 2 Indonesia Champion by overcoming Malaysia, who had to settle for silver. The host country, Indonesia was placed third.

The Indonesian's women team, however, did not have the same fortune as their male counterpart, falling to third-placed Vietnam in the women's tournament. The final of the women's championship also saw favorites Thailand suffer a scare in the first set, losing 11-15 to the South Koreans. After a nerve-wracking second set which was deuce at 15 to 15, Thailand eventually secures victory by winning it 17-15 and went on to win two more sets to be gold medallist at this series.

The winner of 2011–12 ISS Series 2 Indonesia in both categories is Thailand, while Malaysia and Indonesia were placed the first and second runner-ups in men's events, respectively. South Korea and Vietnam women's national teams sequentially end the tournament with second and third place.

=== Team Allocation ===
The first round, or group stage, saw respectively 9 and 6 of men's and women's teams, which was equally divided into 2 groups, Each group featured a round-robin of games, with each team playing against every other team in their group once. The group stage result is based on points accumulated, the top 2 teams from each group advanced to the semi-finals or playoff stage.

=== Participating Countries ===
Men' event
| Group A | Group B |
|---|---|
| Indonesia (Host) | Brunei |
| Japan | Chinese Taipei |
| Malaysia | Singapore |
| USA | South Korea |
| —N/a | Thailand |

Women's event
| Group A | Group B |
|---|---|
| Malaysia | Indonesia (Host) |
| South Korea | Japan |
| Thailand | Vietnam |

=== Men's results ===
Group A (Men)

Group A
| Rank | Country | Games played | Win | Lost | Pts |
|---|---|---|---|---|---|
| 1 | Malaysia | 3 | 3 | 0 | 9 |
| 2 | Indonesia | 3 | 2 | 1 | 7 |
| 3 | Japan | 3 | 1 | 2 | 4 |
| 4 | USA | 3 | 0 | 3 | 0 |

23 February 2012
| Indonesia | 3-1 | Japan |
| Malaysia | 3-0 | USA |
| Indonesia | 3-0 | USA |
24 February 2012
| Japan | 0-3 | Malaysia |
| USA | 0-3 | Japan |
| Indonesia | 1-3 | Malaysia |

Group B (Men)

Group B
| Rank | Country | Games played | Win | Lost | Pts |
|---|---|---|---|---|---|
| 1 | Thailand | 4 | 4 | 0 | 12 |
| 2 | South Korea | 4 | 3 | 1 | 9 |
| 3 | Brunei | 4 | 2 | 2 | 6 |
| 4 | Singapore | 4 | 1 | 3 | 5 |
| 5 | Chinese Taipei | 4 | 0 | 4 | 0 |

23 February 2012
| Brunei | 0-3 | South Korea |
| Thailand | 3-0 | Singapore |
| Chinese Taipei | 0-3 | Singapore |
| Brunei | 0-3 | Thailand |
24 February 2012
| Chinese Taipei | 0-3 | South Korea |
| Singapore | 2-3 | Brunei |
| South Korea | 0-3 | Thailand |
| Brunei | 3-0 | Chinese Taipei |
25 February 2012
| Singapore | 0-3 | South Korea |
| Chinese Taipei | 0-3 | Thailand |

Knock-out Rounds (Men)

Semi-finals
25 Feb
Malaysia | 3
South Korea | 0
25 Feb
Thailand | 3
Indonesia | 0

Final
26 Feb
Malaysia | 0
Thailand | 3
Third place
26 Feb
South Korea | 1
Indonesia | 3

5th-9th Ranking

| Pos | Team | Pld | W | L | Pts | SW | SL | SR | SPW | SPL | SPR | Placing |
|---|---|---|---|---|---|---|---|---|---|---|---|---|
| 1 | Brunei | 4 | 2 | 2 | 6 | 6 | 8 | 0.750 | 163 | 177 | 0.921 | 5th |
| 2 | Japan | 2 | 1 | 1 | 4 | 4 | 6 | 0.667 | 97 | 133 | 0.729 | 6th |
| 3 | Singapore | 4 | 1 | 3 | 5 | 5 | 9 | 0.556 | 142 | 176 | 0.807 | 7th |
| 4 | Chinese Taipei | 4 | 0 | 4 | 0 | 0 | 12 | 0.000 | 69 | 180 | 0.383 | 8th |
| 5 | United States | 3 | 0 | 3 | 0 | 0 | 9 | 0.000 | 50 | 136 | 0.368 | 9th |

Source: "ISS Indonesia 2012 - Day 1 - Tournament Results". International Sepaktakraw Federation. June 4, 2016. Archived from the original on 2016-06-04.

=== Women's Results ===
Group A (Women)

Group A
| Rank | Country | Games played | Win | Lost | Pts |
|---|---|---|---|---|---|
| 1 | Thailand | 2 | 2 | 0 | 6 |
| 2 | South Korea | 2 | 1 | 1 | 3 |
| 3 | Malaysia | 2 | 0 | 2 | 1 |

23 February 2012
| Malaysia | 1-3 | South Korea |
23 February 2012
| South Korea | 0-3 | Thailand |
| Malaysia | 0-3 | Thailand |

Group B (Women)

Group B
| Rank | Country | Games played | Win | Lost | Pts |
|---|---|---|---|---|---|
| 1 | Indonesia | 2 | 2 | 0 | 6 |
| 2 | Vietnam | 2 | 1 | 1 | 4 |
| 3 | Japan | 2 | 0 | 2 | 1 |

23 February 2012
| Japan | 0-3 | Vietnam |
24 February 2012
| Indonesia | 3-1 | Japan |
| Indonesia | 3-1 | Vietnam |

Knock-out Rounds (Women)

Semi-finals
25 Feb
Thailand | 3
Vietnam | 0
25 Feb
Indonesia | 0
South Korea | 3

Final
26 Feb
Thailand | 3
South Korea | 1
Third place
26 Feb
Vietnam | 3
Indonesia | 1

5th-6th Ranking

| Pos | Team | Pld | W | L | Pts | SW | SL | SR | SPW | SPL | SPR | Placing |
|---|---|---|---|---|---|---|---|---|---|---|---|---|
| 1 | Malaysia | 2 | 0 | 2 | 1 | 1 | 6 | 0.167 | 69 | 101 | 0.683 | 5th |
| 2 | Japan | 2 | 0 | 2 | 1 | 1 | 6 | 0.167 | 67 | 100 | 0.670 | 6th |

Source: "ISS Indonesia 2012 - Day 1 - Tournament Results". International Sepaktakraw Federation. June 4, 2016. Archived from the original on 2016-06-04.

== ISS Series 3 Singapore ==
2011–12 ISS Series 3 Singapore
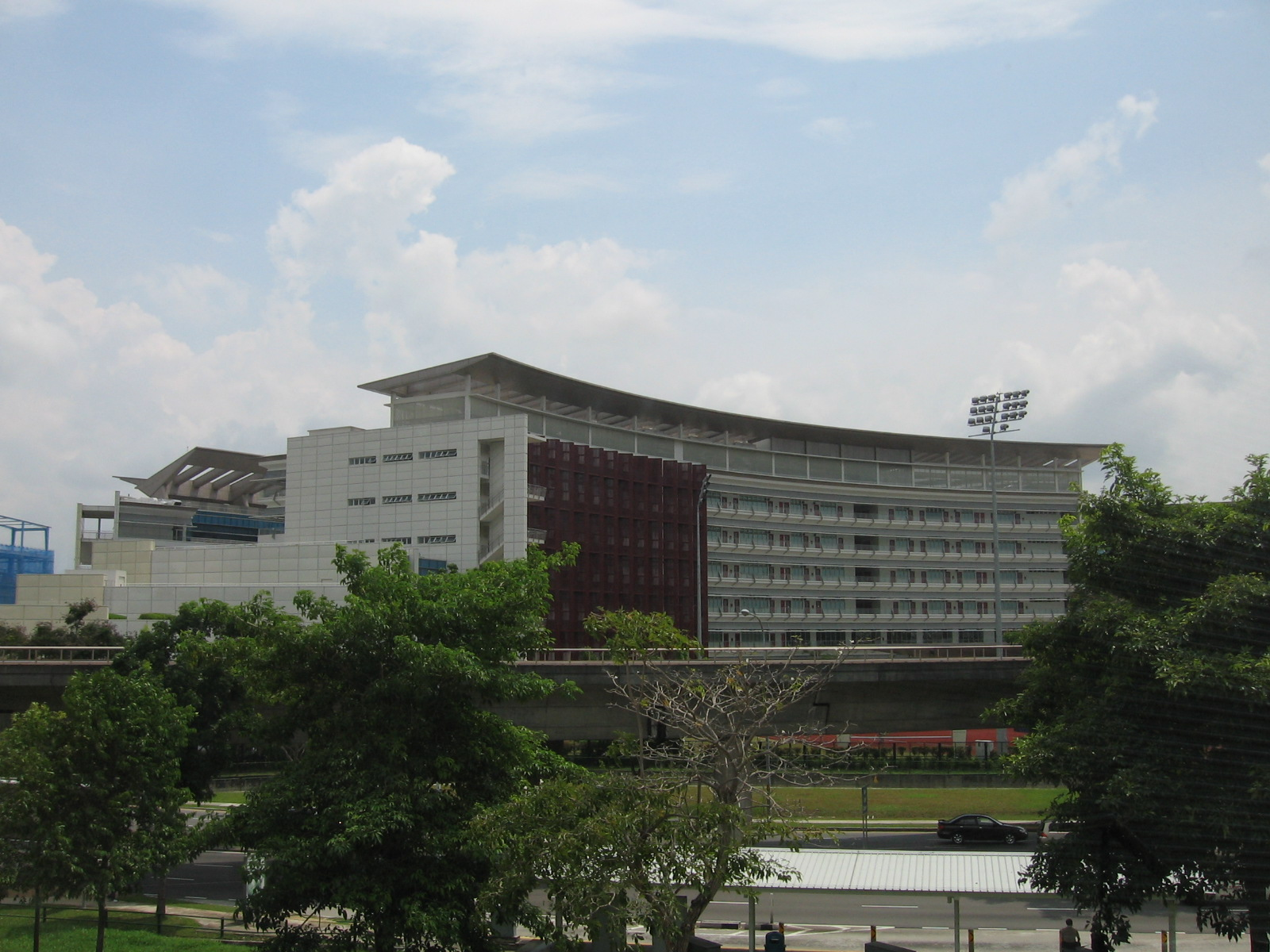
- ITE College East, the venue of the tournament.
- Genre: Sport event
- Begins: May 3, 2012
- Ends: May 6, 2012
- Venue: ITE College East
- Location: Singapore
- Participants: Men: 10 teams; Women: 6 teams
- Organiser: International Sepaktakraw Federation
- Sponsor: Marathon (Thailand) Co., Ltd.

The third series of the 2011–12 ISS was held in the island of Singapore from 3 May 2012 to 6 May 2012, at ITE East Simei In this edition welcomed the return of both Philippines' and India's men national teams. The Indian national team's return to ISS nearly pay dividends for them as they made it to the playoffs-round. However, after defeating Singapore, they ultimately fall to dominant Thailand in the semi-finals and eventually had to settle for a non-medal spot as they lost their third-place playoffs to South Korea. In the finals, Thailand's reign as the number one team in the sport of sepaktakraw continued as they outplayed Indonesia in straight sets.

The number of women's team remains the same at 6 teams, with China taking over South Korea's place from the previous series in Indonesia. In the finals, second runner-up for the two previous editions, Vietnam, finally made it to the finals on their third try. However, they were up against strong favorites, Thailand, who dominated proceedings in the first two sets. The eventual runner-up Vietnam however, did not give up until the end and nearly came back into the game at the third set, eventually losing 15-13. With the star presence of Payom Srihongsa, who scored 29 out of 30 successful spikes during the match, the Thailand women's national team clinched its third back-to-back gold medal in the first season of ISTAF SuperSeries. In the fight for third, South Korea, runner up for two previous series continued to hold a spot on the podium as they overcame their disappointing semi-final defeat to triumph India 3-0.

For the summary, the winner of 2011–12 ISS Series 3 Singapore is Thailand in both men's and women's events, while Indonesia acquired the first and second runner-up in men's and women's races, respectively. Vietnam continued to secure its spot in second place in women's events, and South Korea men's team finished their journey as the second runner-up.

=== Team Allocation ===
The first round, or group stage, saw 9 men's and 6 women's teams equally divided into 2 groups, Each group featured a round-robin of games, with each team playing against every other team in their group once. The group stage result is based on points accumulated. In the men's groups, the top 3 teams from group A as well as the top 4 teams from group B advanced to the quarter-finals or playoff stage. The host nation also advances automatically to the playoff stage. Meanwhile, in the women's group, the only top 2 teams from each group advanced to the playoff round, there was no women team for the host country.

=== Participating Countries ===
Men's event
| Host | Singapore |
| Group A | Group B |
| Brunei | India |
| Philippines | Japan |
| Indonesia | Malaysia |
| South Korea | Thailand |
| —N/a | USA |

Women's event
| Host | No women national team |
| Group A | Group B |
| Indonesia | China |
| Japan | Malaysia |
| Thailand | Vietnam |

=== Men's results ===
Group A (Men)

Group A
| Rank | Country | Games played | Win | Lost | Pts |
|---|---|---|---|---|---|
| 1 | South Korea | 3 | 3 | 0 | 9 |
| 2 | Indonesia | 3 | 2 | 1 | 6 |
| 3 | Philippines | 3 | 1 | 2 | 3 |
| 4 | Brunei | 3 | 0 | 3 | 1 |

3 May 2012
| Indonesia | 0-3 | South Korea |
| Brunei | 0-3 | Philippines |
| Philippines | 0-3 | Indonesia |
| South Korea | 3-1 | Brunei |
4 May 2012
| Indonesia | 3-0 | Brunei |
| Philippines | 0-3 | South Korea |

Group B (Men)

Group B
| Rank | Country | Games played | Win | Lost | Pts |
|---|---|---|---|---|---|
| 1 | Thailand | 4 | 4 | 0 | 12 |
| 2 | Malaysia | 4 | 3 | 1 | 9 |
| 3 | Japan | 4 | 2 | 2 | 7 |
| 4 | India | 4 | 1 | 3 | 4 |
| 5 | USA | 4 | 0 | 4 | 0 |

3 May 2012
| Thailand | 3-0 | Malaysia |
| Japan | 3-0 | USA |
| India | 0-3 | Thailand |
| Malaysia | 3-1 | Japan |
4 May 2012
| USA | 0-3 | Thailand |
| Malaysia | 3-0 | India |
| USA | 0-3 | Malaysia |
| Japan | 3-1 | India | 5 May 2012 |
| India | 3-0 | USA |
| Thailand | 3-0 | Japan |

Knock-out Rounds (Men)

Quarter-finals
5 May
Singapore | 1
India | 3
5 May
Thailand | 3
Philippines | 0
5 May
Indonesia | 3
Malaysia | 2
5 May
Japan | 2
South Korea | 3

Semi-finals
6 May
India | 0
Thailand | 3
6 May
Indonesia | 3
South Korea | 1

Final
6 May
Thailand | 3
Indonesia | 0
Third place
6 May
India | 0
South Korea | 3

5th-8th Ranking

| Pos | Team | Pld | W | L | Pts | SW | SL | SR | SPW | SPL | SPR | Placing |
|---|---|---|---|---|---|---|---|---|---|---|---|---|
| 1 | Malaysia | 5 | 3 | 2 | 11 | 15 | 7 | 2.143 | 230 | 184 | 1.250 | 5th |
| 2 | Japan | 5 | 2 | 3 | 9 | 9 | 10 | 0.900 | 205 | 247 | 0.830 | 6th |
| 3 | Singapore (H) | 1 | 0 | 1 | 1 | 1 | 3 | 0.333 | 46 | 56 | 0.821 | 7th |
| 4 | Philippines | 4 | 1 | 3 | 3 | 3 | 9 | 0.333 | 120 | 166 | 0.723 | 8th |

Source: "ISS Singapore 2012 - Day 1- Tournament Results". International Sepaktakraw Federation (in Thai). June 4, 2016. Archived from the original on 2016-06-04.
(H) Host

9th-10th Placing

| 5 May; 18:30 | Brunei | 3–0 | United States | ITE College East, Singapore |
| 5 May; 18:30 | (15–0, 15–6, 15–6); P2 Report | | | ITE College East, Singapore |

=== Women's Results ===
Group A (Women)

Group A
| Rank | Country | Games played | Win | Lost | Pts |
|---|---|---|---|---|---|
| 1 | Thailand | 2 | 2 | 0 | 6 |
| 2 | Indonesia | 2 | 1 | 1 | 3 |
| 3 | Japan | 2 | 0 | 2 | 0 |

3 May 2012
| Thailand | 3-0 | Japan |
| Indonesia | 0-3 | Thailand |
4 May 2012
| Japan | 0-3 | Indonesia |

Group B (Women)

Group B
| Rank | Country | Games played | Win | Lost | Pts |
|---|---|---|---|---|---|
| 1 | Vietnam | 2 | 2 | 0 | 6 |
| 2 | Malaysia | 2 | 1 | 1 | 4 |
| 3 | China | 2 | 0 | 2 | 1 |

3 May 2012
| Vietnam | 3-1 | Malaysia |
| China | 0-3 | Vietnam |
4 May 2012
| Malaysia | 3-1 | China |

Knock-out Rounds (Women)

Semi-finals
5 May
Thailand | 3
Malaysia | 0
5 May
Vietnam | 3
Indonesia | 0

Final
6 May
Thailand | 3
Vietnam | 0
Third place
6 May
Malaysia | 0
Indonesia | 3

5th-6th Placing

| 5 May; 19:30 | China | 3–2 | Japan | ITE College East, Singapore |
| 5 May; 19:30 | (15–11, 11–15, 15–6, 10–15, 15–8); P2 Report | | | ITE College East, Singapore |

== ISS Final Series Thailand ==
2011–12 ISS Final Series Thailand
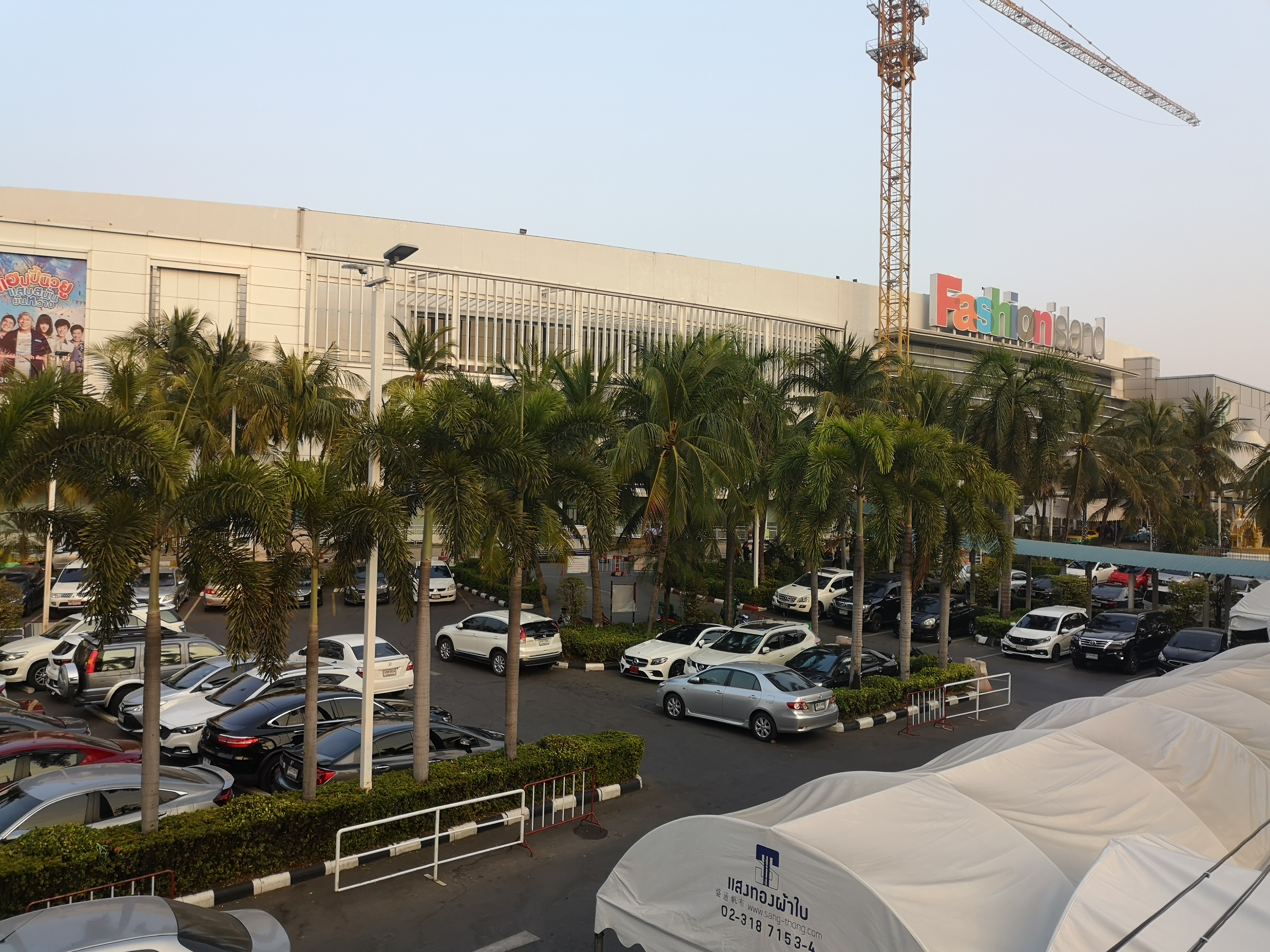
- Fashion Island, the venue of the tournament.
- Genre: Sport event
- Begins: June 28, 2012
- Ends: July 1, 2012
- Venue: Fashion Island
- Locations: Bangkok, Thailand
- Participants: Men: 12 nations; Women: 7 nations
- Organiser: International Sepaktakraw Federation
- Sponsor: Marathon (Thailand) Co., Ltd.; BEC Tero

The final series of the inaugural ISTAF SuperSeries was held in Fashion Island, Bangkok in Thailand from 28 June 2012 to 1 July 2012. This tournament saw the debut appearance of the Vietnam men's national team, as well as the first European team, Germany. Germany's appearance is a sign of the increasing popularity of the sport and a growing testament that the International Sepaktakraw Federation is meeting its objective of spreading the sport beyond its roots of South-East Asia. Their performance in the final series was also encouraging. Even though Germany eventually lost both its games to Malaysia and the United States, it did manage to gain two points in the group stage by winning two sets. Vietnam's appearance too was promising, even though it lost both matches like Germany, it won three sets from the two games.

Malaysia's men national team came back strong in this edition as well, after its disappointing exit in the quarter-final to Indonesia in the previous series. It defeated Philippines in straight sets during the quarter-final, and also overcame a resilient South Korea in the semi-finals. However, they failed to find an answer to the supremacy of Thailand and had to settle for the runner-up spot. South Korea continues to show its defiance that the sport of sepaktakraw is dominated by South-East Asian countries, coming in at second runner-up for the third time in the season, still chasing after the elusive silver or gold medals.

The expectation of the returning South Korea's women national team was high after their runner-up spot in the first series. However, things did not pan out well for them as Vietnam, the emerging powerhouse of the women's sepaktakraw after Thailand, defeated them in the semi-finals. Even though Vietnam lost in the finals to Thailand in a repeat of the last series, it marked the successive appearance of Vietnam on the podium for every series in the first season of ISTAF SuperSeries as two silvers and two bronzes. South Korea subsequently failed Malaysia in a close match which ended 3-2 in Malaysia's favor.

=== Team Allocation ===
The first round, or group stage, saw 11 men's teams divided into 4 groups of 3 (one group had only 2 teams). Each group featured a round-robin of games, with each team playing against every other team in their group once. The group result is based on points accumulated, the top 2 teams from each group advanced to the quarter-finals or playoff stage. The host nation also advances to the playoff round automatically. Meanwhile, in the group stage of the women events, saw 6 women's teams divided equally into 2 groups, each group compete in a round-robin of games, the winner of each group and one of the best runner-up advanced to the playoff round, to meet the host nation which was automatically advances to this round.

=== Participating Countries ===
Men's event
| Host | Thailand | | |
| Group A | Group B | Group C | Group D |
| Philippines | Brunei | Germany | India |
| Indonesia | South Korea | Malaysia | Japan |
| Singapore | Vietnam | USA | —N/a |

Women's event
| Host | Thailand |
Group A
| Indonesia | South Korea |
| India | Malaysia |
| Japan | Vietnam |

=== Men's results ===
Group A (Men)

Group A
| Rank | Country | Games played | Win | Lost | Pts |
|---|---|---|---|---|---|
| 1 | Singapore | 2 | 2 | 0 | 6 |
| 2 | Philippines | 2 | 1 | 1 | 5 |
| 3 | Indonesia | 2 | 0 | 2 | 0 |

28 June 2012
| Indonesia | 0-3 | Singapore |
| Philippines | 3-0 | Indonesia |
29 June 2012
| Singapore | 3-2 | Philippines |

Group B (Men)

Group B
| Rank | Country | Games played | Win | Lost | Pts |
|---|---|---|---|---|---|
| 1 | South Korea | 2 | 2 | 0 | 6 |
| 2 | Brunei | 2 | 1 | 1 | 3 |
| 3 | Vietnam | 2 | 0 | 2 | 3 |

28 June 2012
| South Korea | 3-1 | Vietnam |
| Vietnam | 2-3 | Brunei |
29 June 2012
| Brunei | 0-3 | South Korea |

Group C (Men)

Group C
| Rank | Country | Games played | Win | Lost | Pts |
|---|---|---|---|---|---|
| 1 | Malaysia | 2 | 2 | 0 | 6 |
| 2 | USA | 2 | 1 | 1 | 3 |
| 3 | Germany | 2 | 0 | 2 | 2 |

28 June 2012
| Malaysia | 3-0 | Germany |
| Germany | 2-3 | USA |
29 June 2012
| USA | 0-3 | Malaysia |

Group D (Men)

Group D
| Rank | Country | Games played | Win | Lost | Pts |
|---|---|---|---|---|---|
| 1 | Japan | 2 | 1 | 1 | 3 |
| 2 | India | 2 | 1 | 1 | 3 |

28 June 2012
| Japan | 3-0 | India |
29 June 2012
| India | 3-0 | Japan |

Knock-out Rounds (Men)

Quarter-finals
30 Jun
Malaysia | 3
Philippines | 0
30 Jun
South Korea | 3
Japan | 0
30 Jun
Thailand | 3
Brunei | 0
30 Jun
Singapore | 3
USA | 0

Semi-finals
1 Jul
Malaysia | 3
South Korea | 1
1 Jul
Thailand | 3
Singapore | 0

Final
1 Jul
Malaysia | 0
Thailand | 3
Third place
1 Jul
South Korea | 3
Singapore | 1

5th-8th Ranking

| Pos | Team | Pld | W | L | Pts | SW | SL | SR | SPW | SPL | SPR | Placing |
|---|---|---|---|---|---|---|---|---|---|---|---|---|
| 1 | Japan | 3 | 2 | 1 | 6 | 6 | 3 | 2.000 | 122 | 101 | 1.208 | 5th |
| 2 | Philippines | 3 | 1 | 2 | 5 | 5 | 6 | 0.833 | 77 | 111 | 0.694 | 6th |
| 3 | United States | 3 | 1 | 2 | 3 | 3 | 8 | 0.375 | 127 | 144 | 0.882 | 7th |
| 4 | Brunei | 3 | 1 | 2 | 3 | 3 | 8 | 0.375 | 107 | 156 | 0.686 | 8th |

Source: "ISS Thailand 2012 - Day 1 Tournament Results". International Sepaktakraw Federation (in Thai). June 4, 2016. Archived from the original on 2016-06-04.

9th-11th Ranking

| Pos | Team | Pld | W | L | Pts | SW | SL | SR | SPW | SPL | SPR | Placing |
|---|---|---|---|---|---|---|---|---|---|---|---|---|
| 1 | Vietnam | 2 | 0 | 2 | 3 | 3 | 6 | 0.500 | 110 | 115 | 0.957 | 9th |
| 2 | Germany | 2 | 0 | 2 | 2 | 2 | 6 | 0.333 | 74 | 122 | 0.607 | 10th |
| 3 | India | 2 | 0 | 2 | 0 | 0 | 6 | 0.000 | 56 | 90 | 0.622 | 11th |

Source: "ISS Thailand 2012 - Day 1 Tournament Results". International Sepaktakraw Federation (in Thai). June 4, 2016. Archived from the original on 2016-06-04.

=== Women's Results ===
Group A (Women)

Group A
| Rank | Country | Games played | Win | Lost | Pts |
|---|---|---|---|---|---|
| 1 | Vietnam | 2 | 2 | 0 | 6 |
| 2 | Malaysia | 2 | 1 | 1 | 4 |
| 3 | Indonesia | 2 | 0 | 2 | 0 |

| 28 June; 10:00 | Vietnam | 3–0 | Indonesia | Fashion Island, Bangkok |
| 28 June; 10:00 | Indonesia team walked out P2 Report | | | Fashion Island, Bangkok |

| 28 June; 16:00 | Indonesia | 0–3 | Malaysia | Fashion Island, Bangkok |
| 28 June; 16:00 | Indonesia team walked out P2 Report | | | Fashion Island, Bangkok |

| 29 June; 10:00 | Malaysia | 1–3 | Vietnam | Fashion Island, Bangkok |
| 29 June; 10:00 | (8–15, 4–15, 15–7, 8–15); P2 Report | | | Fashion Island, Bangkok |

Group B (Women)

Group A
| Rank | Country | Games played | Win | Lost | Pts |
|---|---|---|---|---|---|
| 1 | South Korea | 2 | 2 | 0 | 6 |
| 2 | Japan | 2 | 1 | 1 | 3 |
| 3 | India | 2 | 0 | 2 | 1 |

| 28 June; 15:00 | India | 1–3 | South Korea | Fashion Island, Bangkok |
| 28 June; 15:00 | (8–15, 17–15, 6–15, 2–15); P2 Report | | | Fashion Island, Bangkok |

| 28 June; 20:00 | Japan | 3–0 | India | Fashion Island, Bangkok |
| 28 June; 20:00 | (15–3, 15–12, 15–5); P2 Report | | | Fashion Island, Bangkok |

| 29 June; 09:00 | South Korea | 3–0 | Japan | Fashion Island, Bangkok |
| 29 June; 09:00 | (15–8, 15–10, 15–12); P2 Report | | | Fashion Island, Bangkok |

Knock-out Rounds (Women)

Semi-finals
30 Jun
Thailand | 3
Malaysia | 0
30 Jun
Vietnam | 3
South Korea | 1

Final
1 Jul
Thailand | 3
Vietnam | 0
Third place
1 Jul
Malaysia | 3
South Korea | 2

5th-6th placing

| 30 June; 11:00 | Japan | 3–0 | India | Fashion Island, Bangkok |
| 30 June; 11:00 | (15–5, 15–13, 15–5); P2 Report | | | Fashion Island, Bangkok |
