= ISTAF SuperSeries =

International sepaktakraw competition

- Official logo of the Games
- Status: Inactive
- Genre: Sport event
- Frequency: Annually
- Inaugurated: 8 September 2011
- Founder: International Sepaktakraw Federation
- Most recent: 2 November 2015
- Organiser: International Sepaktakraw Federation
- Website: sepaktakraw.org

The ISTAF SuperSeries (abbreviated: ISS) was an international sepaktakraw competition organized by the International Sepaktakraw Federation (ISTAF) held for three editions from 2011 to 2015. The ISS was the only elite international Sepaktakraw tournament recognized by the ISTAF aside from the ISTAF World Cup and King's Cup. The current format involves a qualification phase through ISTAF World Cup, which usually takes place every four years, to determine which teams qualify for the tournament phase. In the tournament phase, 8 teams for men's and 6 for women's events, including the automatically qualifying host nation(s), compete for the title at venues within the host nation(s) for a week.

The tournament was held in a grand prix format, whereby national teams compete in a series of tournaments during a season. The first season features four tournaments which were organized between September 2011 to July 2012 in Bangkok, Palembang, and Singapore. The second and the third seasons also consisted of four tournaments, in which Thailand has won most of the first place in both men's and women's tournaments.

There was an attempt from the ISTAF to conduct the fourth season within 2016. Nonetheless, the tournament was terminated for undisclosed reasons.

== ISTAF SuperSeries Summary ==
Season	Series	Host	Men's tournament				Women's tournament			
Season	Series	Host	Team	Gold	Silver	Bronze	Team	Gold	Silver	Bronze
2011–12	1	(Thailand) Bangkok	12	Thailand	Indonesia	South Korea	8	Thailand	South Korea	Vietnam
2011–12	2	(Indonesia) Palembang	9	Thailand	Malaysia	Indonesia	6	Thailand	South Korea	Vietnam
2011–12	3	Singapore	10	Thailand	Indonesia	South Korea	6	Thailand	Vietnam	Indonesia
2011–12	4	(Thailand) Bangkok	12	Thailand	Malaysia	South Korea	7	Thailand	Vietnam	Malaysia
2011–12	Overall		43	Thailand	Indonesia	Malaysia	27	Thailand	Vietnam	South Korea
2013–14	1	(India) New Delhi	10	South Korea	Malaysia	Indonesia	7	Thailand	Indonesia	Vietnam
2013–14	2	(Thailand) Bangkok	11	Thailand	Malaysia	United States	7	Thailand	South Korea	Vietnam
2013–14	3	(Malaysia) Kota Kinabalu	9	Thailand	Malaysia	Indonesia	5	Thailand	Vietnam	Indonesia
2013–14	4	(Malaysia) Kuala Lumpur	13	Thailand	Malaysia	South Korea	9	Thailand	Malaysia	Indonesia
2013–14	Overall		43	Thailand	South Korea	Malaysia	28	Thailand	Vietnam	Indonesia
2014–15	1	(Myanmar) Naypyidaw	8	Thailand	Malaysia	Myanmar	6	Thailand	Vietnam	Myanmar
2014–15	2	(Malaysia) Melaka	8	Malaysia	Thailand	South Korea	6	Thailand	Vietnam	Myanmar
2014–15	3	(South Korea) Gunsan	8	Thailand	South Korea	Malaysia	6	Thailand	South Korea	Indonesia
2014–15	4	(Thailand) Nakhon Pathom	8	Thailand	Malaysia	Philippines	6	Thailand	Myanmar	South Korea
2014–15	Overall		32	Thailand	Malaysia	South Korea	24	Thailand	Vietnam	Myanmar

== Tournament Format ==
Matches are played using a best of three formats, where teams compete to win two sets. Once one team wins two sets, the remaining sets (if any) are discarded. If any team wins the first two sets, it wins the match, and the remaining one set is not played.

The first round, or group stage, features 8 men's and 6 women's teams, respectively divided into groups of 4 and 3; each team playing a round-robin against every other team in their group. Based on points accumulated, the top 2 teams from each group advanced to the playoff stage, which featured two rounds of matches, each round eliminating half of the teams entering that round; namely the semifinal and final rounds. In addition, there was also a play-off to decide the fifth to eighth placings.

Regu format

- Each team is represented by three players on the court, with two additional substitutes.
- The three players on the court are divided into three specialist positions including; the ‘tekong’ who serves the ball; the ‘feeder’ who sets the ball up and facilitates the attack; the ‘killer’ or striker, who spikes the ball set by the feeder.
- The players can swap positions throughout the match.

Group format

- Teams were awarded points based on the number of sets they won, as opposed to the traditional group scoring based on wins and losses.
- This system was devised to bolster competitive spirit, rewarding teams for every set they won, regardless of whether they won the match.
- If there two or more teams are even on points at the end of the group stage, individual points earned during the group stage matches will be used as a tie-breaker.

Set Format

- Each set is won by the side which scores twenty-one (21) points with a minimum lead of two (2) points.
- In the event of a twenty to twenty tie (20-20), the set shall be won by the side which gets a lead of two (2) points, or when a side reaches twenty-five (25) points (whichever occurs first).
- When the score is tied at 20-20, the Match Referee will announce "setting up to 25 points".
- During the third set, the teams shall change sides when one Regu reaches 11 points.

== Tournament ranking ==
Ranking index
Position	Points
1st place	250
2nd place	230
3rd place	210
4th place	200
5th place	190
6th Place	180
7th Place	170
8th Place	160
N Place	Point of N+1 Place -10

Men's ranking
Position	Country	Accumulation points
1.	Thailand	980
2.	Malaysia	920
3.	Myanmar; Singapore; South Korea	770
6.	Japan	710
7.	Indonesia	560
8.	China	490
9.	Philippines	210
10.	India	180
Rangking Updated: 26 October 2015

Women's ranking
Position	Country	Accumulation points
1.	Thailand	1000
2.	Vietnam	860
3.	Malaysia	760
4.	Japan	720
5.	Myanmar	650
6.	South Korea	640
7.	Indonesia	410
Rangking Updated: 26 October 2015

Note: The ranking is only measured from the latest tournament, not the all-time ranking.

== Medal tally ==
Men's tournament
Rank	Nation	Gold	Silver	Bronze	Total
1	Thailand	10	1	0	11
2	Malaysia	1	8	1	10
3	South Korea	1	1	5	7
4	Indonesia	0	2	3	5
5	Myanmar	0	0	1	1
5	Philippines	0	0	1	1
5	United States	0	0	1	1
Totals (7 entries)		12	12	12	36

Women's tournament
Rank	Nation	Gold	Silver	Bronze	Total
1	Thailand	12	0	0	12
2	Vietnam	0	5	4	9
3	South Korea	0	4	1	5
4	Indonesia	0	1	4	5
5	Myanmar	0	1	2	3
6	Malaysia	0	1	1	2
Totals (6 entries)		12	12	12	36

== See also ==
- ISTAF World Cup
- King's Cup Sepaktakraw World Championship
