= Melaka International Trade Centre =

Convention center in Ayer Keroh, Malacca, Malaysia

- Pusat Perdagangan Antarabangsa Melaka
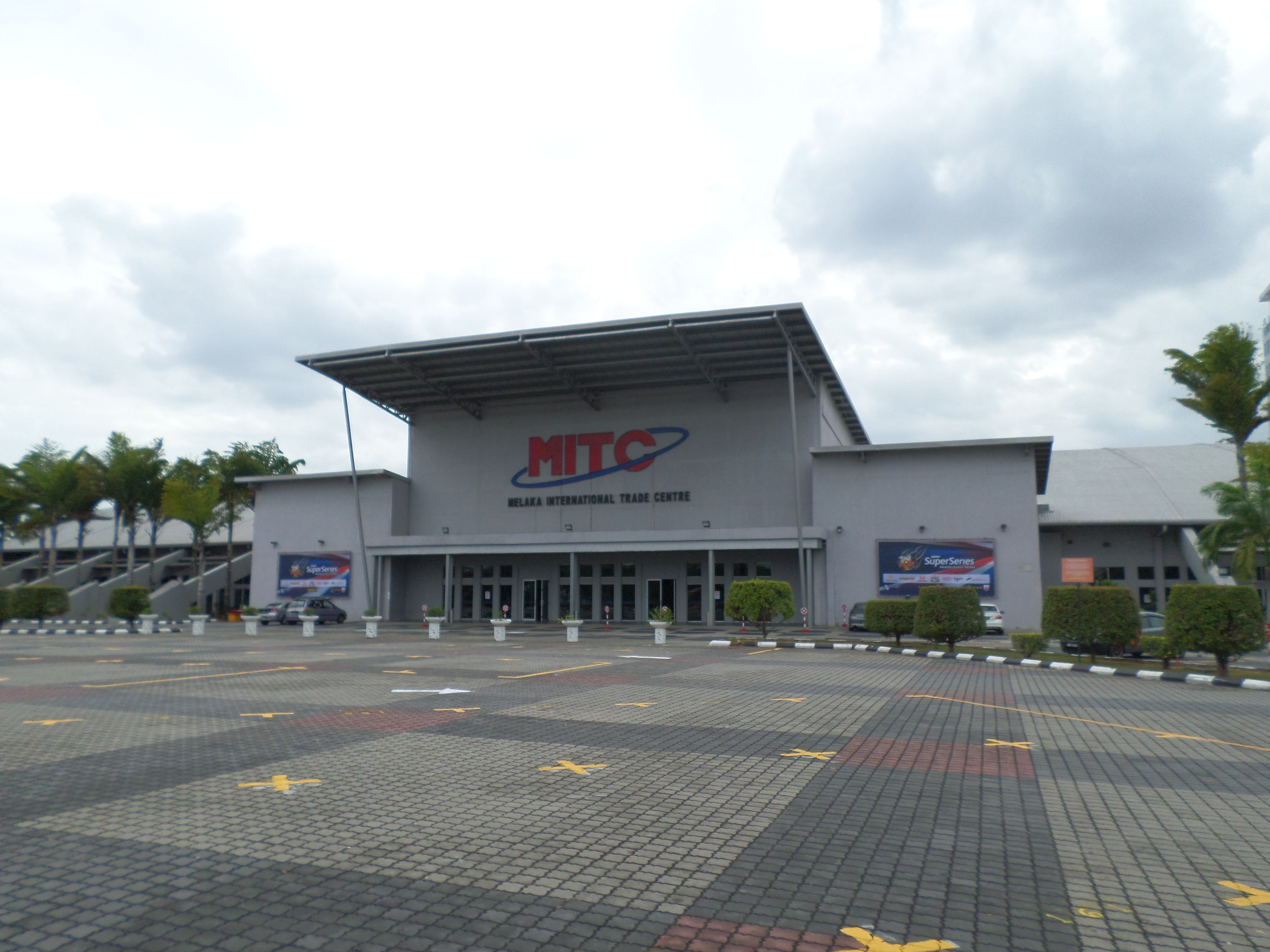
- Interactive map of Melaka International Trade Centre
- Location: Ayer Keroh, Malacca, Malaysia
- Coordinates: 2°16′18″N 102°17′6″E
- Owner: Melaka International Trade Centre Sdn Bhd (subsidiary of Malacca State Development Corporation)
- Operator: Melaka International Trade Centre Sdn Bhd (subsidiary of Malacca State Development Corporation)

Construction
- Built: December 2002
- Opened: June 2003

Website
- mitc.org.my

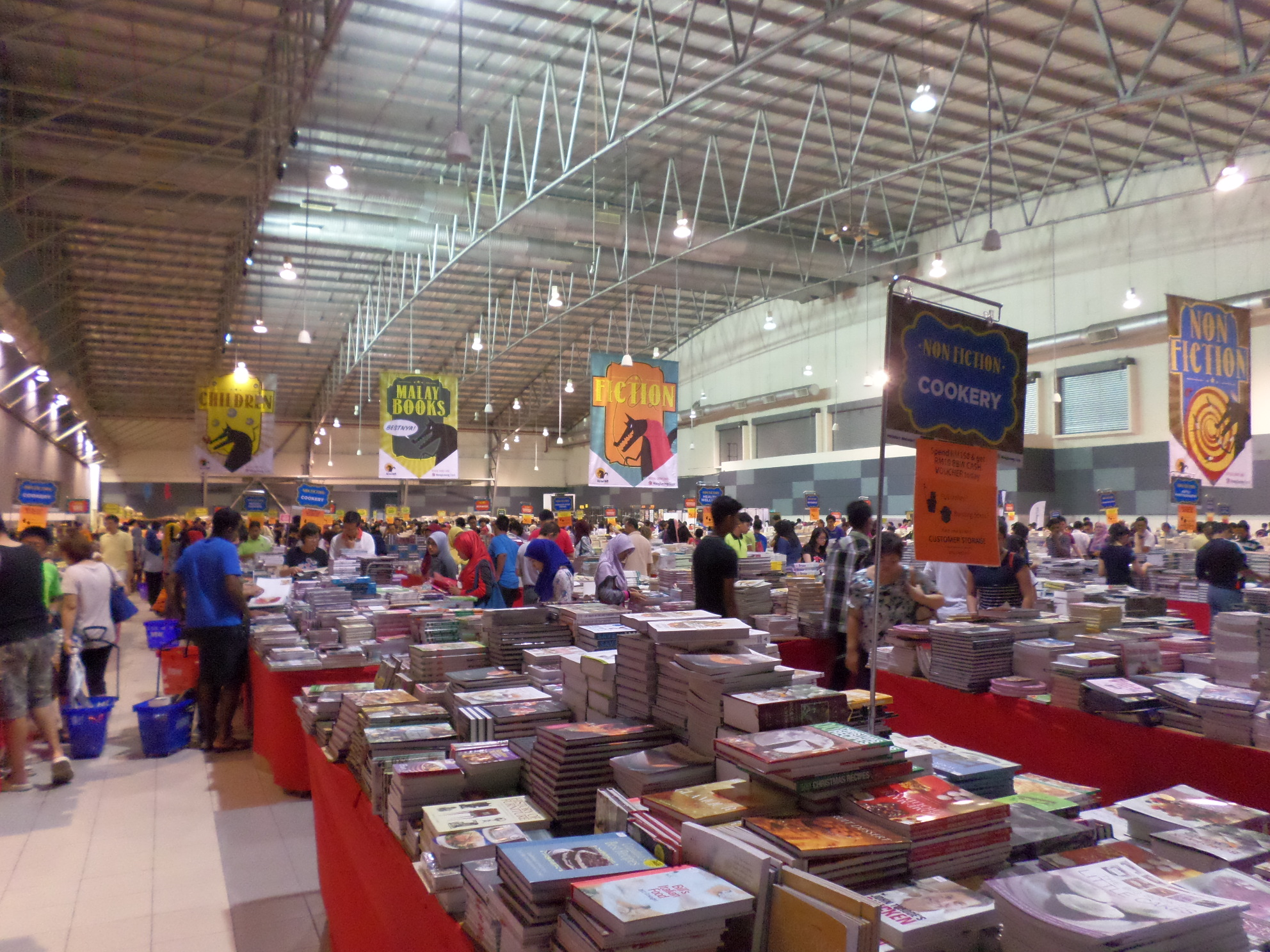
Melaka International Trade Centre exhibition hall

Melaka International Trade Centre (Note: This convention centre uses the Malay language spelling of the state's name, as opposed to the more traditional English language spelling of its name, "Malacca".) (MITC; Malay: Pusat Perdagangan Antarabangsa Melaka) is a conference centre situated in the town of Ayer Keroh, in the Malaysian state of Malacca. It was officially launched in June 2003 by Mohammad Ali bin Rustam, the former Chief Minister of Malacca as the main hub of the state's MICE tourism. The exhibition centre is part of a larger namesake complex that was developed in stages, which also includes business districts, hotels, sports complex and federal and state government offices.

== History ==
The idea to build an international exhibition centre for Malacca state-based multinational companies was conceived in the late 1990s by then-Chief Minister of Malacca Mohd Ali Rustam after a business trip to Taiwan. A plot of land with an area of 72.84 hectares in Ayer Keroh was identified as the permanent site for the exhibition centre.

On 4 August 2000, the State Development Corporation set up a temporary site for the exhibition centre on the fifth and sixth floors of the State UMNO Building at Jalan Hang Tuah in Malacca Town (now Malacca City), pending the completion of the main building in Ayer Keroh.

The building's construction began in November 2001 and completed in December 2002 with a cost of RM60 million. Its surrounding facilities like the hotels, government offices, commercial lots and the bowling centre were completed few years later. There was also a plan by the Malacca Municipal Council (now City Council) to build a bus terminal within the MITC Business District, but this did not materialise.

== Facilities ==
- 13,090 m^{2} Exhibition Hall
- Grand Ballroom
- Auditorium
- Board Room
- VIP Room
- Surau
- Dining Hall

== Notable events ==
- 2009 QubicaAMF Bowling World Cup: 13–20 November 2009
- 2010 Sukma Games: 12–19 June 2010.
- 2010 Paralimpiad Malaysia: 21–26 November 2010.
- 2014–15 ISTAF SuperSeries Series 2 Malaysia: 5–8 February 2015.
- 2022 World Pencak silat Championships: 26–31 July 2022
- 2023 Asian Karate Championships: 21–23 July 2023
- Hari TVET Negara 2025: 13-15 June 2025

== Business district ==
- Federal Tower (Menara Persekutuan)
- Melaka Planetarium - A now-abandoned attraction at the big roundabout in the middle of the MITC business district developed by state-owned company Kumpulan Melaka Berhad, subsidiary of Malacca Chief Minister Incorporated.
- Melaka International Bowling Centre (MIBC) - A 52-lane international standard bowling centre built on a land of 5 hectares and opened in August 2009, also owned by Kumpulan Melaka Berhad, subsidiary of Malacca Chief Minister Incorporated.
- MITC Hotel (formerly MITC Ancasa Hotel) - A hotel opened in 2005 and located adjacent to the main convention centre owned by Malacca State Development Corporation subsidiary MCorp Hotel Sdn Bhd.
- Mydin Hypermarket
- MITC Tower, home to several State Statutory Bodies

== See also ==
- List of tourist attractions in Malacca
