= Palembang Sport and Convention Center =

Sports venue in Palembang, Indonesia

- PSCC
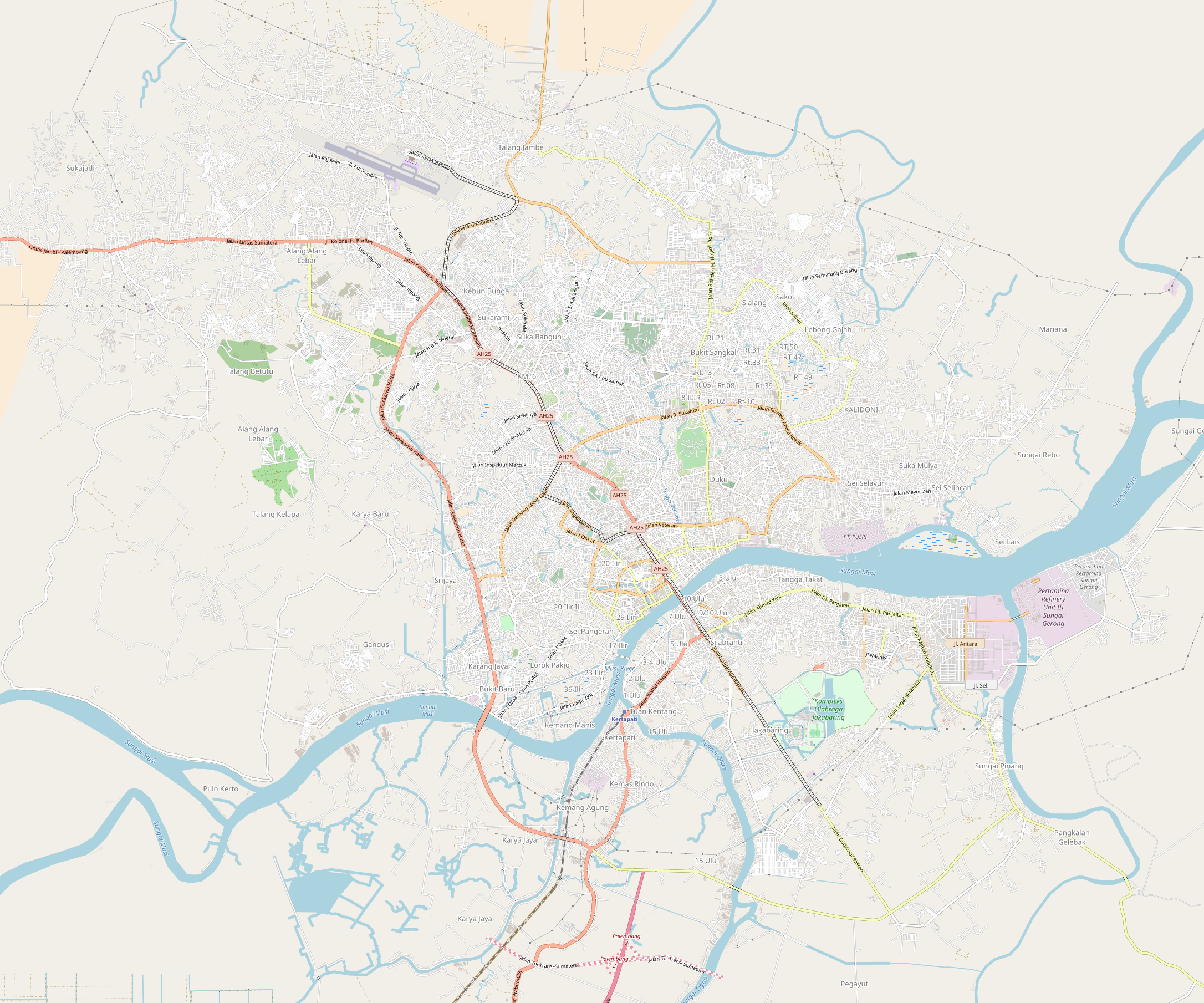
- Location in Palembang
- Former names: Sport Hall (1971-2010)
- Location: Jalan POM IX, Palembang, South Sumatra, Indonesia
- Coordinates: 2.978235°S 104.745299°E
- Capacity: 4,000
- Public transit: Bumi Sriwijaya

Construction
- Groundbreaking: 1971
- Opened: October 2011
- Renovated: 2010

Palembang Sport and Convention Center or simply PSCC (formerly known as the Sport Hall) is a multi-purpose indoor arena located in the downtown of Palembang, South Sumatra, Indonesia, in one of the city's well-known business area, Centre Point. Established in 2011 for the 2011 Southeast Asian Games, it is praised for its modern and chic design, and its volleyball field is the best in the nation.

== History ==
PSCC was built in 1971, and inaugurated by the President Soeharto. It was built for the National Scholar Games (or POMNAS in Indonesian) in the 80s.

Later in October 2010, the government renovated the building massively for the 2011 Southeast Asian Games, as Palembang was chosen as the host city.

In October 2011, the building was established with the new contemporary and modern design. The field and the facilities were also renovated nicely.

Before the 2011 Southeast Asian Games, the 2011 Asian Men's Club Volleyball Championship was held in the occasion to welcoming the SEA Games. The Paykan Tehran of Iran ranked 1 in the final standing, followed by Almaty of Kazakhstan and Shanghai Tang Dynasty of China.

== See also ==
- List of indoor arenas
- Beach City International Stadium
- Indonesia Arena
- Istora Gelora Bung Karno
- The BritAma Arena
- Jawa Pos Arena
