= Indira Gandhi Sports Stadium =

Sports stadium in Puducherry, India

- Sports Stadium
- Interactive map of Indira Gandhi Sports Stadium
- Full name: Indira Gandhi Sports Stadium
- Former names: Sports Stadium
- Location: Puducherry, India
- Coordinates: 11.922°N 79.829°E
- Owner: Pondicherry State Sports Council

Tenants
- Pondicherry football team Pondicherry women's football team

Indira Gandhi Sports Stadium, home of Kabali FC is a main sports stadium in union territory of Puducherry in India. The stadium has facilities of football and hockey field, apart from the facilities of Indoor arena.

The stadium has hosted several state and national level sports events and tournaments. The stadium is owned and managed by Pondicherry State Sports Council.

== See also ==
- Yanam
- YSR Indoor Stadium
