= Sport in Thailand =

Sports in Thailand play a significant role in Thai culture, with both participants and spectators engaging in a wide variety of activities. Muay Thai, a traditional martial art, is deeply ingrained in Thai history and has evolved into national sport. Aside from muay Thai, association football is the most popular sport in Thailand, followed by volleyball and badminton. There is also a diverse range of sports that are also popular throughout the country, including tennis, golf, swimming, athletics, cycling, motorsports, snooker, and sepak takraw, which is one of Thailand's two national sports along with muay Thai. Water sports such as scuba diving, kiteboarding, jet skiing, surfboarding, rafting, sea kayaking, windsurfing, wakeboarding, long boat racing, and long-tail boat racing are also popular among sports tourists and locals alike.

Thailand has a history of competing in and achieving success in international sports competitions, as well as making remarkable contributions to regional events. The country has won the most medals in the Southeast Asian Games multiple times and has ranked first in the region. Moreover, Thailand has ranked as high as seventh in the all-time medal standings at the Asian Games. Additionally, Thailand has also earned the most gold medal in the Olympics among Southeast Asian countries.

Multi-sport events within the country, such as the Thailand National Games and the Thailand National Youth Games, provide a platform for athletes from all provinces to participate, showcasing Thailand's ability to foster and develop sports at the grassroots level and encouraging healthy competition among young athletes. These events are organized by the Sports Authority of Thailand (SAT), which is responsible for promoting and developing sports in the country. The SAT collaborates with various sports associations and organizations to host national and international events with the support of the National Sports Development Fund (NSDF), which provides financial assistance for the development of sports in Thailand. Furthermore, Thailand also celebrates a National Sports Day annually on December 16, which aims to promote sports and physical activity across the country with various events and activities organized in different regions to encourage participation and healthy competition among the public.

== Traditional sports ==
=== National sports ===
==== Muay Thai ====
Muay Thai, also known as "The Art of Eight Limbs", is a traditional martial art and national sport of Thailand. It has its roots in ancient Thai military training and was developed as a form of unarmed combat that utilizes fists, elbows, knees, shins, and feet for strikes. Prior to the introduction of gloves, fighters used rope-bound hands for striking in Muay Boran, an ancient martial art of Thailand that influenced the development of modern-day Muay Thai. Today, Muay Thai fighters are required to wear protective gloves during fights. Over time, Muay Thai became a sport and a form of self-defense in Thailand. It has been a part of Thai culture for centuries, with King Chulalongkorn's reign in 1868 often considered as the golden age for the sport.

One of the most famous legends in Muay Thai is that of Nai Khanom Tom, a warrior who was captured by the Burmese. He was chosen to fight in a festival where he won against 10 of the best Burmese fighters, using his skills in Muay Boran. This feat is celebrated in Thailand on March 17 every year as National Muay Thai Day.

While Muay Thai has been popular in Thailand for a long time, it gained widespread popularity in the western world in the late 20th century. Today, Muay Thai is both a professional and amateur sport, with many fighters competing in stadiums across Thailand and in international competitions. The two most prestigious stadiums for Muay Thai matches in Thailand are the Lumpinee Boxing Stadium and Rajadamnern Stadium, both located in Bangkok. These stadiums have hosted some of the biggest Muay Thai fights in history and are considered the pinnacle of the sport. Muay Thai is also showcased in various professional organizations and competitions, such as ONE Championship, which is known for featuring top Muay Thai fighters from around the world. As of January 11, 2023, Muay Thai has been officially recognized as a new member of the United States Olympic and Paralympic Committee (USOPC). This recognition brings the sport one step closer to potentially being included in future Olympic Games.

Notable Muay Thai fighters include Buakaw Banchamek, Tawanchai P.K. Saenchaimuaythaigym, Rodtang Jitmuangnon, Nong-O Gaiyanghadao, Saenchai PKSaenchaimuaythaigym, and Sam-A Gaiyanghadao.

==== Sepak takraw ====
Takraw, also known as Sepak Takraw, is one of Thailand's national sports, alongside Muay Thai. The game has a rich history dating back to the Ayutthaya period when its earliest versions were played without a net. The traditional game involved passing a rattan ball to another person using only the feet, knees, chest, and head, without letting it touch the ground. Takraw has since evolved into a fiercely competitive sport and began taking shape in Thailand. The first official rules for Takraw were established by the Siam Sports Association in 1829. After four years, the association incorporated a volleyball-style net and organized the inaugural public competition. The sport then quickly gained popularity and was soon incorporated into the Physical Training curriculum in schools. The game is also known by different names and played in various ways in other Southeast Asian countries. In 1960, representatives from Malaysia, Singapore, Myanmar, and Thailand met in Kuala Lumpur to standardize the guidelines for the sport, ultimately agreeing to officially call it "Sepak Takraw" after intense debate.

Thailand is the most successful team in Sepak Takraw, having won all the tournaments in the ISTAF World Cup in both men's and women's categories in 2011 and 2017, and four gold medals in all of the premier division's events they participated in at the 2022 tournament. They have also won the most gold medals in the King's Cup Sepaktakraw World Championship, Asian Games, and Southeast Asian Games.

The International Sepaktakraw Federation (ISTAF), which is the international governing body for the sport of Sepak takraw, was established in 1988 with five founding member countries including Malaysia, Thailand, Singapore, Indonesia, and Myanmar. The Takraw Association of Thailand (TAT) was founded in 1983 and has played a crucial role in the development and promotion of the sport in Thailand and globally.

=== Other sports ===
==== Krabi krabong ====
Krabi Krabong is a traditional martial art of Thailand that combines various weapons and techniques. While it was originally developed for combat and self-defense, it has evolved into a competitive sport as well. In modern times, Krabi Krabong tournaments and competitions are held to showcase the skills of practitioners, as well as to promote the art form to a wider audience. Competitions typically involve a series of solo and group performances, with competitors demonstrating their proficiency with weapons such as the sword, staff, and spear.

==== Long-tail boat racing ====
Long-tail boat racing is a boat racing involves racing long-tail boats, also known as "Ruea Hang Yao". These wooden boats have been used for transportation and fishing in Thailand for centuries and are powered by an engine mounted on a long pole at the rear. Thanks to their agility and speed, they're perfect for racing, and the Thailand Powerboat Association is the governing body that oversees the sport. They organize the annual Thailand Long-Tail Boat Championship, which takes place in various locations throughout Thailand.

==== Long boat racing ====
Long boat racing is a traditional Thai boat racing that dates back to ancient times. It was mentioned in historical archives during the Ayutthaya period, including those of La Loubère, a French diplomat who visited the kingdom in the 17th century. The sport features long boats ranging from small to large, crewed by skilled paddlers who compete along a distance of about 600–650 meters, with a buoy to indicate the distance every 100 meters. Today, long boat racing is a popular traditional festival held in every region of Thailand, at both the regional and national level.

==== Makruk ====
Makruk is a strategic board game similar to chess, but with some distinctly different rules and piece movements. The game is played by two players with the objective of capturing the opponent's king, just like in chess. Widely played in Thailand, Makruk has gained recognition as a national heritage, with tournaments and competitions held regularly. Makruk has also been featured in the Southeast Asian Games.

==== Dab Thai ====
Dab Thai, also known as Thai fencing, is a sport developed from Krabi-Krabong by Lieutenant Commander Charoon Trairat in 1935. The sport originated from the Sri Trirat Sword School and was developed into a competitive fighting game that aimed to simulate real-life situations. It differs from fencing as it utilizes Thai swords, which are single-edged and curved. The sport gained popularity at Chulalongkorn University, where a competition for the title of Khun Phon Chula was held, drawing the attention of students from various universities. Today, the Thai Sports Association under the Royal Patronage has pushed for the development of Dab Thai to become an international standard and it is recognized as a Thai national conservation sport. Various agencies, including the Sports Authority of Thailand and the Bangkok Metropolitan Administration, provide assistance to the sport's growth. Dab Thai became a demonstration sport at the 38th Thailand National Youth Games, which took place in Nakhon Sawan province between March 25, 2023, and April 3, 2023.

== Team sports ==
=== Basketball ===
Basketball was introduced to Thailand in the 1930s when Mr. Noppakhun Pongsuwan, a Chinese teacher, helped the Department of Physical Education translate the rules of the game. In 1953, the Amateur Basketball Association of Thailand was established and registered with the National Cultural Council, later becoming the Basketball Association of Thailand (BSAT). The BSAT joined the International Basketball Federation (FIBA) on July 10, 1953. Since then, the national team has participated in regional competitions such as the Southeast Asian Games and achieved some success. In 2012, the establishment of the Thailand Basketball League (TBL) has brought increased attention and investment to the sport.

=== Football ===
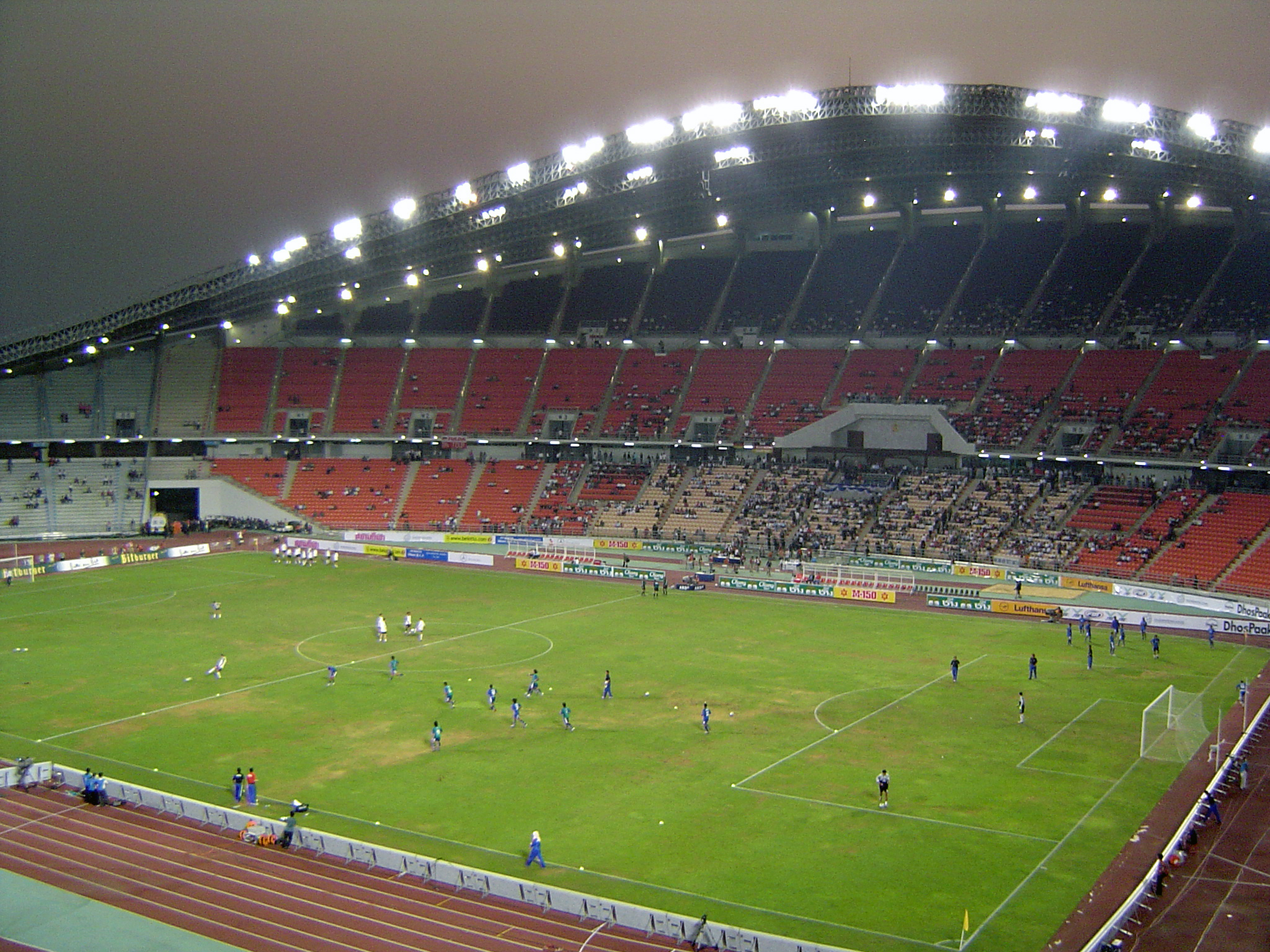
Rajamangala National Stadium

Football is the most popular sport in Thailand, with a strong domestic league and passionate fanbase. The Thailand national football team, nicknamed the War Elephants, has a long history and has consistently been one of the top teams in Southeast Asia. They have won the AFF Championship seven times, in 1996, 2000, 2002, 2014, 2016, 2020, and 2022. The team has also achieved some success on the continental stage, finishing third in the 1972 AFC Asian Cup. Thailand is also a dominant force in Southeast Asian football, with the men's team winning the gold medal in the Southeast Asian Games a record 16 times. The team has also advanced to the final round of World Cup qualification twice, in 2002 and 2018, but unfortunately, they have failed to qualify for the FIFA World Cup so far. In addition, Thailand's U-23 team has won the gold medal at the Southeast Asian Games a record 7 times. The U-17 team has qualified for the FIFA U-17 World Cup twice and became the AFC champion in 1998. The Thai League 1, is the top professional football league in the country. Established in 1996, the league currently consists of 16 teams. Some of the most popular and successful teams in the league include Buriram United, Muangthong United, and Chonburi FC.

Thailand also has a strong women's football program, with the women's national team nicknamed the Chaba Kaew. The team won the AFC Women's Asian Cup in 1983 and have qualified for two FIFA Women's World Cup in 2015 and 2019. In addition, the team has won the AFF Women's Championship four times, in 2011, 2015, 2016, and 2018. The women's team has also had success in the Southeast Asian Games, winning the championship five times, in 1985, 1995, 1997, 2007, and 2013. There is also a women's league in Thailand, called the Thai Women's League, which was established in 2009 and currently consists of 10 teams.

The Football Association of Thailand also known as FA Thailand is responsible for organizing and overseeing football in the country, including the national team and domestic league.

=== Futsal ===
Thailand has a strong presence in futsal, a growing sport in the country. The national futsal team, known as the Chang Suek Toh Lek, has achieved notable success in the Asian Futsal Championship, finishing as runners-up in 2008 and 2012 and earning third place in 2000, 2002, 2003, 2004, and 2016. The team has also qualified for the FIFA Futsal World Cup six times, establishing itself as one of the top teams in Asia. Both the men's and women's national futsal teams have dominated the Southeast Asian Games, winning the championship in every edition where futsal was included. The national teams have also secured the AFF Futsal Championship title 16 times, underscoring their position as one of the strongest teams in the region. The Thailand Futsal League, founded in 2006, is the premier professional futsal league in the country and features 14 teams. The most successful teams in the league include Chonburi Blue Wave, Port Futsal Club, and CAT Telecom Futsal Club. The Football Association of Thailand also oversees futsal in the country.

=== Rugby union ===
In 1938, the Thai Rugby Union was established and later legally registered in 1939. The sport, however, is not widely popular in Thailand, as association football remains the dominant sport. Despite this, rugby union is slowly growing in popularity, with more and more people becoming interested in the sport, particularly in the Bangkok area.

=== Teqball ===
Teqball is a new sport that has gained popularity in Thailand. Invented in 2012 by three young Hungarians, Teqball combines elements of popular games like association football and table tennis. The game is played on a curved table, and players hit a football with any part of the body except arms and hands. The Teqball Association of Thailand was established in 2020 and quickly gained attention from Thai sports fans. At the 2022 Teqball World Championships in Germany, the Thai Teqball team impressed foreign players with their floating and sepak takraw-style kicks. Despite not winning any medals, they were voted as the public's favorite team and played an exciting exhibition match against the Brazilian team.

=== Ice hockey ===
Ice hockey has been played in Thailand since the 1980s. The Ice Skating Association of Thailand, established in 1976, was later renamed to the Ice Hockey Association of Thailand (IHAT). Despite the tropical climate and lack of ice rinks, the popularity of ice hockey has grown in Thailand, with several teams competing in local and international tournaments. The Thai national ice hockey teams have achieved some results in international competitions, with the men's team participating in the World Championships, Asian Winter Games, and Challenge Cup of Asia, and the women's team competing in the World Championships, Asian Winter Games, and Women's Challenge Cup of Asia.

=== Volleyball ===
Volleyball is one of the most popular sports in Thailand, with both the men's and women's national teams having achieved some success on the international stage. The women's team has won the gold medal at the Asian Women's Volleyball Championship twice, in 2009 and 2013, and the silver medal twice, in 2017 and 2019. They also won the silver medal at the 2018 Asian Games and have won the gold medal at the Southeast Asian Games a record 15 times, most recently in 2021. In addition, they have won two gold medals at the ASEAN Grand Prix in 2019 and 2022, and finished 8th place in the FIVB Volleyball Women's Nations League in 2022, as well as finishing in 13th place in the FIVB Volleyball Women's World Championship in 2022, 2018, 2010, and 1998. The men's team has also achieved success in regional competitions, winning the gold medal at the Southeast Asian Games eight times, in 1985, 1995, 2001, 2005, 2011, 2013, 2015, and 2017. They also reached the semi-finals and finished in 4th place at the 2010 Asian Games.

The Volleyball Thailand League was founded in 2005 and has become one of the most competitive volleyball leagues in Asia. The most recent champions of the Women's Volleyball Thailand League are Supreme Chonburi, who won their third title, while the Women's team of Nakhon Ratchasima have also achieved success, winning five championships. In the Men's Volleyball Thailand League, Nakhon Ratchasima has dominated the league, winning seven championships, including the most recent one in the 2020-2021 season.

Thailand has also competed in beach volleyball at the international level, but the sport is not as popular as indoor volleyball. The country's national teams in beach volleyball participated in the 2018–2020 AVC Beach Volleyball Continental Cup in both the women's and the men's sections. However, despite its growing popularity, beach volleyball remains a niche sport in Thailand compared to indoor volleyball.

The Thailand Volleyball Association (TVA), which was founded in 1959, is responsible for promoting and developing volleyball in the country, including both indoor and beach volleyball.

== Individual sports ==
=== Athletics ===
The Athletics Association of Thailand (AAT), founded in 1948, has played a role in developing and promoting athletics in the country. Puripol Boonson has emerged as a promising new talent in recent years, breaking several national records at the 2022 Thailand National Games and setting a new Southeast Asian Games record in the men's 200 metres in 2022. In August 2022, he also set a new world record for the men's 100 metre sprint under 18 years old at the 2022 World Athletics U20 Championships.

Thailand has hosted several international athletics events, including the 2017 Asian Youth Athletics Championships and the 2021 World Mountain and Trail Running Championships. In addition, the country hosted the World Athletics Global Running Conference in 2022, along with the Amazing Thailand Marathon Bangkok.

=== Badminton ===
Badminton is one of the most popular sports in Thailand, with a long history dating back to the establishment of the Badminton Association of Thailand (BAT) in 1950. Since then, Thailand has produced many notable badminton players who have achieved great success both nationally and internationally. One of the most successful badminton players from Thailand is Ratchanok Intanon. She burst onto the international scene by winning the World Junior Championships in 2009. In the following years, she went on to win the title twice more, becoming the most successful player ever in individual events at the BWF World Junior Championships. Intanon also won the World Championships in 2013 and has been ranked as the world number one in women's singles badminton.

Another player who has achieved great success in both junior and senior categories is Kunlavut Vitidsarn. He is a three-time World Junior champion, winning in 2017, 2018, and 2019, and also became the first men's singles player to win three World Junior Championships titles. He has also made a name for himself in the senior category, winning the silver medal at the 2022 BWF World Championships. Other notable players from Thailand include Busanan Ongbamrungphan, Nitchaon Jindapol, and Kantaphon Wangcharoen.

In addition to singles events, Thailand has also produced several notable players in doubles events. In women's doubles, Benyapa Aimsaard and Nuntakarn Aimsaard have made a name for themselves on the international stage, as have Jongkolphan Kititharakul and Rawinda Prajongjai. In mixed doubles, Dechapol Puavaranukroh and Sapsiree Taerattanachai.

=== Bowling ===
Bowling has gained popularity in Thailand over the years, with many talented bowlers representing the country in international competitions. Yannaphon Larpapharat is one such notable bowler who has made a name for himself in the sport. He won a gold medal at the 2014 Asian Games in Incheon in the men's individual event. Sithiphol Kunaksorn is another notable Thai bowler, who won a bronze medal at the 2014 Asian Games in the men's singles event.

=== Combat sports ===
==== Boxing ====
Thailand has produced several notable boxers who have made their mark in the sport. Somluck Kamsing is one of the most famous Thai boxers, having won the gold medal in featherweight boxing at the 1996 Olympic Games in Atlanta. Khaosai Galaxy who held the WBA super flyweight title for over seven years and defended his title 19 times. Somjit Jongjohor is another notable Thai boxer who won the gold medal in light flyweight boxing at the 2008 Olympic Games in Beijing. Other notable boxers from Thailand include Samart Payakaroon, Pongsaklek Wonjongkam, and Srisaket Sor Rungvisai, who have all achieved great success in their respective weight classes.

==== Jujutsu ====
Jujutsu has seen a rise in popularity in Thailand after the Thai jujutsu team's impressive performance at the 2022 World Games in the United States, winning 2 gold medals and 2 silver medals. As a result, the Ju-Jitsu Association of Thailand is expanding the sport's popularity by organizing at least four competitions to collect points at the youth, youth, and public championships in Thailand. The last Ju-Jitsu Thailand Championship saw more than 2,000 athletes participating in the competition.

==== Taekwondo ====
The Taekwondo Association of Thailand (TAT) was founded in 1978 and has played role in promoting the sport of taekwondo in Thailand. Panipak Wongpattanakit is a highly successful athlete in the sport, winning numerous medals at various international championships and making history by winning Thailand's first-ever Olympic gold medal in taekwondo at the 2020 Summer Olympics in the women's 49 kg event. She is also a world champion and a gold medalist at the 2018 Asian Games in the 49 kg category

==== Thai martial arts ====
- Muay Thai
- Krabi krabong
- Muay boran
- Lerdrit
- Silat Pattani

=== Cycling ===
Cycling is one of the favorite sports in Thailand, and the Thai Cycling Association was established in 1959. One of the notable Thai national cyclists is Komet Sukprasert, who was sent to train at the World Cycling Centre (WCC) in Switzerland. He won the Asian BMX Championship 2022 and the Malaysia BMX International Race 2022 in Malaysia

=== Golf ===
Thailand has earned a reputation as the golf capital of Asia due to its growing popularity as a golfing destination. Tourists from Japan, Korea, Singapore, South Africa, and Western countries come to play golf in Thailand every year, and the country has more than 200 world-class golf courses. Notable golf courses in Thailand include Amata Spring Country Club, Alpine Golf and Sports Club, Thai Country Club, and Black Mountain Golf Club, which have all hosted major golf tournaments.

Thailand has also produced several notable golfers, including Ariya Jutanugarn and her sister Moriya Jutanugarn, who have both won multiple LPGA titles. Other notable Thai golfers include Thongchai Jaidee, Kiradech Aphibarnrat, and Jazz Janewattananond, who have all competed in major golf tournaments and gained international recognition for their success in the sport.

One of the rising stars in Thai golf is Atthaya Thitikul, who became the youngest golfer ever to win a professional tournament at just 14 years old. She has since gone on to win multiple tournaments on both the LPGA Tour and the Ladies European Tour, and in October 2022, she became the number one ranked golfer in the Women's World Golf Rankings.

=== Jet skiing ===
Jet skiing has become increasingly popular in Thailand in recent years, particularly in the realm of sports tourism. The sport has its own licensed tournament, WGP#1, which is owned and licensed by Thai people and has gained global attention with live broadcasts reaching over a billion households. In fact, the event's live broadcasts covered 50% of the world's population, making it one of the most watched sports in Thai history.

=== Motorsports ===
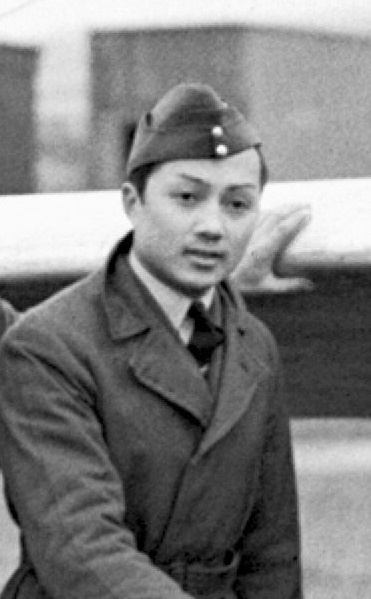
Birabongse Bhanudej was the first Thai and Asian racecar driver to race in Formula One.

Motorsports in Thailand have grown in popularity, building on the legacy of pioneers such as Birabongse Bhanudej, the first Thai and Asian racecar driver to race in Formula One. The country has hosted the MotoGP since 2018 at the Chang International Circuit in Buriram. Thailand has also hosted the Super GT and FIA WTCC Race. Additionally, the country has gained recognition for hosting the Thailand Rally, which is part of the Asia-Pacific Rally Championship and has featured stages on both tarmac and gravel roads. Thailand has produced several notable drivers in international competitions, including Alexander Albon, who has competed in Formula One, and Sandy Stuvik, who has won multiple championships in various racing series. In 2022, Enzo Tarnvanichkul became the first Thai national to win the FIA Karting World Championship in the OK Junior class. The growing popularity of motorsports in Thailand is reflected in the construction of new racetracks and the organization of national and international events, such as the Thailand Super Series and the Thailand MotoGP.

=== Snooker ===
The country has produced several successful snooker players, including James Wattana, Dechawat Poomjaeng, Noppon Saengkham, and Thepchaiya Un-Nooh, who have all competed at the highest levels of the sport. In addition to male players, Thailand also has a notable female player, Nutcharut Wongharuthai, who made history by winning the 2022 World Women's Snooker Championship in Sydney, Australia.

=== Swimming ===
Swimming is one of the favorite sports in Thailand, with many talented athletes representing the country at various international competitions. Notable swimmers include Natthanan Junkrajang, Nuttapong Ketin, Jenjira Srisaard, and Navaphat Wongcharoen.

=== Table tennis ===
Table tennis is growing sport in Thailand, with notable achievements including Suthasini Sawettabut's round of 16 performance at the Tokyo Olympics in 2020, which was the farthest in the history of Thai table tennis at the Olympics. At the 31st SEA Games in Vietnam, Thai players won a record-breaking four gold medals, two silver medals, and two bronze medals. Additionally, the Table Tennis Association of Thailand (TTAT) has been supporting players through initiatives such as the SET Star Table Tennis project and the TTAT Pro League project, which have helped players like Suthasini and Orawan Paranang achieve success in professional leagues in Austria and Spain. These efforts have helped build a strong foundation for the future of table tennis in Thailand.

=== Tennis ===
The Lawn Tennis Association of Thailand (LTAT) is the governing body for tennis in the country and organizes various tournaments and events throughout the year. Notable players include Paradorn Srichaphan, who reached a career-high ranking of world number 9 in singles and won five ATP singles titles, as well as Tamarine Tanasugarn, who reached a career-high ranking of world number 19 in singles and won a total of four WTA singles titles. In addition, Thai players have achieved success in doubles, with the team of Sonchat Ratiwatana and Sanchai Ratiwatana winning 12 ATP doubles titles together.

== Esports ==
In September 2021, the Thai government officially recognized esports as a professional sport. As a result, the local esports industry has received increased funding, promotion, and support, and eligible esports teams and athletes can now receive financial assistance from the Sports Authority of Thailand and its Professional Sports Promotion Fund. The Thailand E-Sports Federation (TESF) has been actively working to develop esports curricula to cultivate competitive gamers who can represent Thailand at the international level. Additionally, Thailand has achieved success in the Southeast Asian Games, winning gold medals in esports events such as FIFA Online 4, Arena of Valor, and Tekken 7. Notable Thai esports players include Anucha "Jabz" Jirawong, Piyapon "TheCruz" Boonchuay, Chirasak "Joena" Moonsarn, Nuengnara "23savage" Teeramahanon, Metasit "Moowan" Leelapipatkul, Teedech "TDKeane" Songsaisakul, and Nopparut "Book" Hempamorn, all of whom have earned significant amounts of money and recognition in their respective games.

== Sport leagues ==
Football

- Thai League 1
- Thai League 2
- Thai League 3
- Thai Women's League
- Thailand Youth League
Basketball

- Thailand Basketball League
Futsal

- Futsal Thai League
Muay Thai

- Thai Fight
Volleyball

- Men's Volleyball Thailand League
- Women's Volleyball Thailand League
Ice hockey

- Thai World Hockey League

== Multi-sport event ==
=== All time medal count ===
Event	Gold	Silver	Bronze	Total	Games
Summer Olympic Games	11	11	19	41	17
Winter Olympics Games	0	0	0	0	5
Summer Paralympic Games	24	29	34	87	10
Winter Paralympics Games	0	0	0	0	0
Summer Youth Olympic Games	12	10	5	27	3
Winter Youth Olympic Games	0	0	0	0	1
Asian Games	132	175	279	586	18
Asian Winter Games	0	0	0	0	5
Asian Para Games	64	102	136	302	3
Asian Indoor and Martial Arts Games	108	106	145	359	6
Asian Beach Games	130	97	91	318	5
Asian Youth Games	17	22	18	57	2
Asian Youth Para Games	81	67	48	196	4
Southeast Asian Games	2,345	2,031	2,074	6,450	31
ASEAN Para Games	1,154	814	625	2,593	10
ASEAN University Games^{[A]}	551	418	404	1,373	20
ASEAN School Games	380	338	384	1,102	11
Summer World University Games	28	30	55	113	18
Winter World University Games	0	0	0	0	6
World Games	8	13	8	29	11
World Beach Games	0	0	0	0	1
World Combat Games	7	5	4	16	2
World Martial Arts Masterships	8	5	10	23	2
Military World Games	0	5	10	15	5
Asian Athletics Championships	25	30	26	81	23
Asian Junior Athletics Championships	25	35	30	90	18
Asian U18 Athletics Championships	5	9	2	16	4

=== Hosted sporting events ===
Year	Event	Sport	Location	Date		Status
Year	Event	Sport	Location	Start	End	Status
1959	Southeast Asian Peninsular Games	Multi-sport event	Bangkok	Dec 12	Dec 17	Regional
1966	Asian Games	Multi-sport event	Bangkok	Dec 9	Dec 20	Continental
1967	Southeast Asian Peninsular Games	Multi-sport event	Bangkok	Dec 9	Dec 16	Regional
1970	Asian Rugby Championship	Rugby union	Bangkok	Jan 10	Jan 18	Continental
1970	Asian Games	Multi-sport event	Bangkok	Dec 9	Dec 20	Continental
1975	Southeast Asian Games	Multi-sport event	Bangkok	Dec 9	Dec 16	Regional
1976	Asian Invitational Badminton Championships	Badminton	Bangkok	Mar 24	Mar 28	Continental
1976	Thomas Cup	Badminton	Bangkok	May 25	June 3	International
1978	Asian Games	Multi-sport event	Bangkok	Dec 9	Dec 20	Continental
1980	Asian Invitational Badminton Championships	Badminton	Bangkok	Dec 10	Dec 14	Continental
1985	Southeast Asian Games	Multi-sport event	Bangkok	Dec 8	Dec 17	Regional
1988	Badminton World Cup	Badminton	Bangkok	Sep		International
1994	World Badminton Grand Prix Finals	Badminton	Bangkok	Dec 7	Dec 11	International
1995	Southeast Asian Games	Multi-sport event	Chiang Mai	Dec 9	Dec 17	Regional
1997	World Weightlifting Championships	Weightlifting	Chiang Mai	Dec 6	Dec 14	International
1998	Asian Games	Multi-sport event	Bangkok	Dec 6	Dec 20	Continental
1999	FESPIC Games	Multi-sport event	Bangkok	Jan 10	Jan 16	Continental
2002	AVC Cup Women's Club Tournament	Volleyball	Bangkok	May 22	May 27	Continental
2003	FIVB Volleyball Boys' U19 World Championship	Volleyball	Suphanburi	July 5	July 13	International
2003	World Amateur Boxing Championships	Boxing	Bangkok	July 6	July 13	International
2003	FIVB Volleyball Women's U20 World Championship	Volleyball	Suphanburi	Sep 6	Sep 14	International
2004	FIFA U-19 Women's World Championship	Football	Bangkok; Chiang Mai; Phuket	Nov 10	Nov 27	International
2005	Asian Airgun Championships	Shooting sports	Bangkok	Sep 12	Sep 19	Continental
2005	Asian Indoor Games	Multi-sport event	Bangkok	Nov 12	Nov 19	Continental
2006	Asian Taekwondo Championships	Taekwondo	Bangkok	Apr 21	Apr 13	Continental
2006	World Cup Taekwondo Team Championships	Taekwondo	Bangkok	Sep 18		International
2007	FIVB Volleyball Women's U20 World Championship	Volleyball	Nakhon Ratchasima	July 20	July 27	International
2007	Summer Universiade	Multi-sport event	Bangkok	Aug 8	Aug 18	International
2007	World Weightlifting Championships	Weightlifting	Chiang Mai	Sep 17	Sep 26	International
2007	Southeast Asian Games	Multi-sport event	Nakhon Ratchasima	Dec 6	Dec 15	Regional
2008	ASEAN Para Games	Multi-sport event	Nakhon Ratchasima	Jan 20	Jan 26	Regional
2008	World Judo Juniors Championships	Judo	Bangkok	Oct 23	Oct 26	International
2009	FIVB Volleyball Girls' U18 World Championship	Volleyball	Nakhon Ratchasima	July 3	July 12	International
2009	FIBA Under-19 World Championship for Women	Basketball	Bangkok	July 23	Aug 2	International
2009	Asian Martial Arts Games	Multi-sport event	Bangkok	Aug 1	Aug 9	Continental
2010	Asian Junior Table Tennis Championships	Table tennis	Bangkok	July 21	July 25	Continental
2010	ASEAN University Games	Multi-sport event	Chiang Mai	Dec 15	Dec 23	Regional
2012	World Junior Wrestling Championships	Wrestling	Pattaya	Sep 4	Sep 9	International
2012	FIFA Futsal World Cup	Futsal	Bangkok; Nakhon Ratchasima	Nov 1	Nov 18	International
2012	Race of Champions	Motorsports	Bangkok	Dec 14	Dec 16	International
2013	IIHF Challenge Cup of Asia	Ice hockey	Bangkok	Mar 16	Mar 24	International
2013	Asian Judo Championships	Judo	Bangkok	Apr 19	Apr 21	Continental
2013	BWF World Junior Championships	Badminton	Bangkok	Oct 23	Nov 3	International
2013	World Para-archery Championships	Archery	Bangkok	Nov 1	Nov 7	International
2014	Asian Beach Games	Multi-sport event	Phuket	Nov 14	Nov 23	Continental
2015	Asian Amateur Boxing Championships	Boxing	Bangkok	Aug 26	Sep 5	Continental
2015	World Touring Car Championship	Touring car racing	Buriram	Nov 1		International
2015	WBPF World Championship	Bodybuilding; Fitness	Bangkok	Nov 24	Nov 30	International
2016	FIVB Volleyball World Grand Prix	Volleyball	Bangkok	June 3	July 10	International
2016	Asian Junior and Cadet Table Tennis Championships	Table tennis	Bangkok	Sep 16	Sep 21	Continental
2017	Asian Canoe Slalom Championships	Canoe slalom	Nakhon Nayok	Feb 24	Feb 26	Continental
2017	Youth World Weightlifting Championships	Weightlifting	Bangkok	Apr 1	Apr 11	Continental
2017	Asian Youth Athletics Championships	Athletics	Bangkok	May 20	May 23	International
2018	Thomas & Uber Cup	Badminton	Bangkok	May 20	May 27	International
2018	Asian Fencing Championships	Fencing	Bangkok	June 17	June 22	Continental
2018	FIBA Asia Champions Cup	Basketball	Bangkok	Sep 27	Oct 2	Continental
2018	MotoGP World Championship	Motorcycle racing	Buriram	Oct 7		International
2019	Asian Amateur Boxing Championships	Boxing	Bangkok	Apr 19	Apr 26	Continental
2019	South East Asian Junior and Cadet Table Tennis Championships	Table tennis	Bangkok	June 4	June 9	Regional
2019	IFMA World Muaythai Championships	Muay Thai	Bangkok	July 22	July 28	International
2019	World Weightlifting Championships	Weightlifting	Pattaya	Sep 18	Sep 27	International
2019	MotoGP World Championship	Motorcycle racing	Buriram	Oct 6		International
2019	World Junior Table Tennis Championships	Table tennis	Nakhon Ratchasima	Nov 24	Dec 1	International
2021	BWF World Tour Finals	Badminton	Nonthaburi	Jan 27	Jan 31	International
2022	Asian Canoe Sprint Championships	Canoe sprint	Rayong	March 24	March 26	Continental
2022	Thomas & Uber Cup	Badminton	Nonthaburi	May 8	May 15	International
2022	South East Asian Junior and Cadet Table Tennis Championships	Table tennis	Bangkok	June 17	June 22	Regional
2022	IIHF U20 Asia and Oceania Championship	Ice hockey	Bangkok	June 25	July 2	Continental
2022	ASEAN University Games	Multi-sport event	Ubon Rachathani	July 26	August 6	Regional
2022	Asian Men's Volleyball Cup	Volleyball	Nakhon Pathom	Aug 7	Aug 14	Continental
2022	ASEAN Grand Prix	Volleyball	Nakhon Ratchasima	Sep 9	Sep 11	Regional
2022	MotoGP World Championship	Motorcycle racing	Buriram	Oct 2		International
2022	World Mountain and Trail Running Championships	Athletics	Chiang Mai	Nov 4	Nov 6	International
2022	Asian Water Polo Championship	Water Polo	Samut Prakan	Nov 7	Nov 14	Continental
2022	IPSC Handgun World Shoot	Shooting sports	Pattaya	Nov 27	Dec 3	International
2022	BWF World Tour Finals	Badminton	Bangkok	Dec 7	Dec 11	International
2023	Thailand Open	Tennis	Hua Hin	Jan 30	Feb 5	International
2023	Thailand Masters	Badminton	Bangkok	Jan 31	Feb 5	International
2023	ACC Men's Challenger Cup	Cricket	Bangkok	Feb 24	Mar 5	Continental
2023	World Women's Snooker Championship	Snooker	Bangkok	Feb 28	Mar 4	International
2023	Six-red World Championship	Snooker	Bangkok	Mar 6	Mar 11	International
2023	Beach Soccer Asian Cup	Beach soccer	Pattaya	Mar 16	Mar 26	Continental
2023	MotoGP World Championship	Motorcycle racing	Buriram	Oct 29		International
2023	Asian Indoor and Martial Arts Games	Multi-sport event	Bangkok; Chonburi	Nov 17	Nov 26	Continental
2025	Southeast Asian Games	Multi-sport event	Bangkok; Chonburi; Songkhla	Dec 9	Dec 20	Regional
2026	ASEAN Para Games	Multi-sport event	Nakhon Ratchasima	Jan 20	Jan 26	Regional

== See also ==
- Thailand at the Olympics
- List of football stadiums in Thailand
- List of sporting events held in Thailand
