= 2022 ISTAF World Cup =

Sepaktakraw tournament

2022 ISTAF World Cup 2022 ISTAF 세팍타크로 월드컵

Tournament details
- Host country: South Korea
- City: Daejeon
- Dates: 25–29 November 2022
- Teams: 13 countries (from International Sepaktakraw confederations)
- Venue: Daejeon Hanbat Sports Complex

Final positions
- Champions: WR-PM: Thailand; WQ-PM: Thailand; MR-PM: Thailand; MR-D1: United States; MQ-PM: Thailand; MQ-D1: United States; MxQ-PM: India

The 2022 ISTAF World Cup (Korean: 2022 ISTAF 세팍타크로 월드컵) was the third edition of the ISTAF World Cup, held from November 25–29, 2022, at the Daejeon Hanbat Sports Complex in Daejeon, South Korea. The tournament was conducted by the International Sepaktakraw Federation (ISTAF) in collaboration with the South Korea Sepak Takraw Association and the Daejeon Metropolitan Sports Association. Originally, the event was scheduled to be held in October 2019 in Goa, India, but was postponed to 2022 due to the COVID-19 pandemic, and the venue was also relocated to Daejeon, South Korea.

Thirteen ISTAF membership countries were confirmed to participate, making it the lowest number of participating nations since the tournament's inception in 2011. The game consisted of three categories, including men's, women's, and mixed, of which the first two categories were conducted in the group tournament ranking system and were additionally divided into two events: regu and quadrant, while the mixed only happened in the quadrant event and was played in the round-robin system. Due to a large number of participating teams, the men's category was further divided based on the previous tournament's performances into two divisions, including Division 1 (D1) and the Premier Division (PM).

Thailand won the tournament with four gold medals in all of the premier division's events they participated in, followed by the United States, which won all of the two events in the division 1 segment, and India was ranked third by winning one in the mixed quadrant.

== History ==
After the completion of the 2017 ISTAF World Cup in Hyderabad, India, the secretary-general and director-general of the International Sepaktakraw Federation (ISTAF), Dato Abdul Halim Bin Khader, announced the hosting of the following tournament in Goa, India, at a press conference held in February at the chamber of Sports Authority of Telangana State (SATS) with the support of the Government of Telangana and the Telangana State Olympic Association, but the date has not yet been finalized. However, due to the impact of the COVID-19 pandemic, the tournament was later postponed indefinitely.

Since the outbreak condition has improved, the ISTAF has sought a host for the tournament's third edition, in which South Korea interested. The MOU agreement ceremony to organize the event between the International Sepak Takraw Federation, Daejeon Metropolitan City, the Daejeon Metropolitan Sports Association, and the Korea Sepaktakraw Association, happened on September 28, 2022, at Daejeon Metropolitan City Hall, making it the first international Sepaktakraw tournament to be held in Korea after the 2017 Cittaslow International Sepaktakraw Tournament in Jeonju. The competition formats were also unveiled at the aforementioned occasion. More than 400 athletes from 15 countries were expected to participate in the tournament, which would be held from November 25–29, 2022, at the Daejeon Hanbat Sports Complex in the city of Daejeon.

== Participating countries ==
=== Regu ===
Women (WR-PM)		Men			
Women (WR-PM)		Division 1 (MR-D1)		Premier division (MR-PM)	
Group A	Group B	Group C	Group D	Group G	Group H
South Korea (H); Chinese Taipei; Thailand; India	Japan; Malaysia; Vietnam	Bangladesh; Iran; Nepal	Germany; Pakistan; United States	South Korea (H); Thailand; Vietnam	India; Japan; Malaysia

=== Quadrant ===
Women (WQ-PM)		Men			
Women (WQ-PM)		Division 1 (MQ-D1)		Premier division (MQ-PM)	
Group I	Group J	Group K	Group L	Group M	Group N
South Korea (H); Chinese Taipei; Thailand; Japan	India; Malaysia; Vietnam	Bangladesh; Iran; Nepal	Germany; Pakistan; United States	South Korea (H); Thailand; Vietnam	India; Japan; Malaysia

=== Mixed quadrant ===
MxQ-PM
South Korea (H)
India
Japan
Malaysia
Vietnam

== Results summary ==
=== Final standings ===
Ranking	Mixed Quadrant (MxQ-PM)	Division 1		Premier Division			
Ranking	Mixed Quadrant (MxQ-PM)	Men's regu (MR-D1)	Men's quadrant (MQ-D1)	Men's regu (MR-PM)	Men's quadrant (MQ-PM)	Women's regu (WR-PM)	Women's quadrant (WQ-PM)
1st place, gold medalist(s)	India	United States	United States	Thailand	Thailand	Thailand	Thailand
2nd place, silver medalist(s)	South Korea	Iran	Iran	Malaysia	India	Vietnam	Vietnam
3rd place, bronze medalist(s)	Japan; Vietnam	Bangladesh; Germany	Bangladesh; Germany	India; South Korea	Malaysia; South Korea	Japan; South Korea	India; South Korea
GS	—N/a	Nepal; Pakistan	Nepal; Pakistan	Japan; Vietnam	Japan; Vietnam	Chinese Taipei; India; Malaysia	Chinese Taipei; Japan; Malaysia

=== Medal table ===
* Host nation (South Korea)

2022 ISTAF World Cup Medal Table
Rank	Nation	Gold	Silver	Bronze	Total
1	Thailand (THA)	14	0	0	14
2	India (IND)	1	1	2	4
3	United States (USA)	1	0	0	1
4	Vietnam (VIE)	0	2	1	3
5	Iran (IRN)	0	2	0	2
6	South Korea (KOR)*	0	1	4	5
7	Malaysia (MAS)	0	1	1	2
8	Bangladesh (BAN)	0	0	2	2
8	Germany (GER)	0	0	2	2
8	Japan (JPN)	0	0	2	2
Totals (10 entries)		16	7	14	37

== Group stage ==
Color legend

- Women's categories
- Men's categories
- Mixed category

=== Regu ===
==== Group A: WR-PM GrA ====
Pos	Team	Pld	W	L	Pts	SW	SL	SR	SPW	SPL	SPR	Qualification
1	Thailand	3	3	0	9	6	0	MAX	126	59	2.136	Final round
2	South Korea	3	2	1	6	4	2	2.000	67	67	1.000	Final round
3	India	3	1	2	2	2	5	0.400	21	42	0.500	
4	Chinese Taipei	3	0	3	1	1	6	0.167	38	84	0.452	

Source: "ISTAF World Cup: India smash their way into semi-finals". Deccan Chronicle. 4 November 2017. Archived from the original on 11 June 2019.

25 November; 09:00	South Korea	2–0	Chinese Taipei	Daejeon Hanbat Sports Complex, Court 2
25 November; 09:00	21–9, 21–16			Daejeon Hanbat Sports Complex, Court 2

25 November; 09:00	Thailand	2–0	India	Daejeon Hanbat Sports Complex, Court 2
25 November; 09:00	21–5, 21–16			Daejeon Hanbat Sports Complex, Court 2

25 November; 12:00	South Korea	2–0	India	Daejeon Hanbat Sports Complex, Court 2
25 November; 12:00	Not Available			Daejeon Hanbat Sports Complex, Court 2

25 November; 16:00	Chinese Taipei	0–2	Thailand	Daejeon Hanbat Sports Complex, Court 2
25 November; 16:00	7–21, 6–21			Daejeon Hanbat Sports Complex, Court 2

26 November; 09:00	South Korea	0–2	Thailand	Daejeon Hanbat Sports Complex, Court 2
26 November; 09:00	15–21, 10–21			Daejeon Hanbat Sports Complex, Court 2

26 November; 10:00	India	2–1	Chinese Taipei	Daejeon Hanbat Sports Complex, Court 2
26 November; 10:00	Not Available			Daejeon Hanbat Sports Complex, Court 2

==== Group B: WR-PM GrB ====
Pos	Team	Pld	W	L	Pts	SW	SL	SR	SPW	SPL	SPR	Qualification
1	Vietnam	2	2	0	6	4	0	MAX	84	47	1.787	Final round
2	Japan	2	1	1	2	2	3	0.667	75	93	0.806	Final round
3	Malaysia	2	0	2	1	1	4	0.250	78	97	0.804	

Source: "ISTAF World Cup: India smash their way into semi-finals". Deccan Chronicle. 4 November 2017. Archived from the original on 11 June 2019.

25 November; 11:00	Vietnam	2–0	Japan	Daejeon Hanbat Sports Complex, Court 2
25 November; 11:00	21–10, 21–10			Daejeon Hanbat Sports Complex, Court 2

25 November; 17:00	Malaysia	0–2	Vietnam	Daejeon Hanbat Sports Complex, Court 2
25 November; 17:00	14–21, 13–21			Daejeon Hanbat Sports Complex, Court 2

26 November; 11:00	Malaysia	1–2	Japan	Daejeon Hanbat Sports Complex, Court 2
26 November; 11:00	21–18, 13–21, 21–12			Daejeon Hanbat Sports Complex, Court 2

==== Group C: MR-D1 GrC ====
Pos	Team	Pld	W	L	Pts	SW	SL	SR	SPW	SPL	SPR	Qualification
1	Iran	2	2	0	6	4	0	MAX	42	20	2.100	Final round
2	Bangladesh	2	1	1	3	2	2	1.000	20	42	0.476	Final round
3	Nepal	2	0	2	0	0	4	0.000	0	0	—	

Source: "ISTAF World Cup: India smash their way into semi-finals". Deccan Chronicle. 4 November 2017. Archived from the original on 11 June 2019.

25 November; 09:00	Bangladesh	0–2	Iran	Daejeon Hanbat Sports Complex, Court 1
25 November; 09:00	10–21, 10–21			Daejeon Hanbat Sports Complex, Court 1

25 November; 16:00	Nepal	0–2	Iran	Daejeon Hanbat Sports Complex, Court 1
25 November; 16:00	Not Available			Daejeon Hanbat Sports Complex, Court 1

26 November; 11:00	Nepal	0–2	Bangladesh	Daejeon Hanbat Sports Complex, Court 1
26 November; 11:00	Not Available			Daejeon Hanbat Sports Complex, Court 1

==== Group D: MR-D1 GrD ====
Pos	Team	Pld	W	L	Pts	SW	SL	SR	SPW	SPL	SPR	Qualification
1	United States	2	2	0	6	4	0	MAX	84	26	3.231	Final round
2	Germany	2	1	1	3	2	2	1.000	57	64	0.891	Final round
3	Pakistan	2	0	2	0	0	4	0.000	33	84	0.393	

Source: "ISTAF World Cup: India smash their way into semi-finals". Deccan Chronicle. 4 November 2017. Archived from the original on 11 June 2019.

25 November; 11:00	Germany	2–0	Pakistan	Daejeon Hanbat Sports Complex, Court 1
25 November; 11:00	21–13, 21–9			Daejeon Hanbat Sports Complex, Court 1

26 November; 09:00	United States	2–0	Pakistan	Daejeon Hanbat Sports Complex, Court 1
26 November; 09:00	21–5, 21–6			Daejeon Hanbat Sports Complex, Court 1

26 November; 13:00	United States	2–0	Germany	Daejeon Hanbat Sports Complex, Court 1
26 November; 13:00	21–6, 21-9			Daejeon Hanbat Sports Complex, Court 1

==== Group G: MR-PM GrG ====
Pos	Team	Pld	W	L	Pts	SW	SL	SR	SPW	SPL	SPR	Qualification
1	Thailand	2	2	0	6	4	0	MAX	84	37	2.270	Final round
2	South Korea	2	1	1	3	2	2	1.000	22	42	0.524	Final round
3	Vietnam	2	0	2	0	0	4	0.000	15	42	0.357	

Source: "ISTAF World Cup: India smash their way into semi-finals". Deccan Chronicle. 4 November 2017. Archived from the original on 11 June 2019.

25 November; 10:00	Thailand	2–0	Vietnam	Daejeon Hanbat Sports Complex, Court 1
25 November; 10:00	21–11, 21–4			Daejeon Hanbat Sports Complex, Court 1

25 November; 17:00	South Korea	2–0	Vietnam	Daejeon Hanbat Sports Complex, Court 1
25 November; 17:00	Not Available			Daejeon Hanbat Sports Complex, Court 1

26 November; 12:00	South Korea	0–2	Thailand	Daejeon Hanbat Sports Complex, Court 1
26 November; 12:00	12–21, 10–21			Daejeon Hanbat Sports Complex, Court 1

==== Group H: MR-PM GrH ====
Pos	Team	Pld	W	L	Pts	SW	SL	SR	SPW	SPL	SPR	Qualification
1	Malaysia	2	2	0	6	4	0	MAX	84	34	2.471	Final round
2	India	2	1	1	2	2	3	0.667	73	93	0.785	Final round
3	Japan	2	0	2	1	1	4	0.250	68	98	0.694	

Source: "ISTAF World Cup: India smash their way into semi-finals". Deccan Chronicle. 4 November 2017. Archived from the original on 11 June 2019.

25 November; 12:00	Japan	1–2	India	Daejeon Hanbat Sports Complex, Court 1
25 November; 12:00	21–14, 17–21, 13–21			Daejeon Hanbat Sports Complex, Court 1

26 November; 10:00	Malaysia	2–0	India	Daejeon Hanbat Sports Complex, Court 1
26 November; 10:00	21–5, 21–12			Daejeon Hanbat Sports Complex, Court 1

26 November; 14:00	Malaysia	2–0	Japan	Daejeon Hanbat Sports Complex, Court 1
26 November; 14:00	21–8, 21–9			Daejeon Hanbat Sports Complex, Court 1

=== Quadrant ===
==== Group I: WQ-PM GrI ====
Pos	Team	Pld	W	L	Pts	SW	SL	SR	SPW	SPL	SPR	Qualification
1	Thailand	3	3	0	9	6	0	MAX	126	47	2.681	Final round
2	South Korea	3	2	1	6	4	2	2.000	97	90	1.078	Final round
3	Japan	3	1	2	3	2	4	0.500	89	119	0.748	
4	Chinese Taipei	3	0	3	0	0	6	0.000	90	126	0.714	

Source: "ISTAF World Cup: India smash their way into semi-finals". Deccan Chronicle. 4 November 2017. Archived from the original on 11 June 2019.

26 November; 13:00	South Korea	2–0	Chinese Taipei	Daejeon Hanbat Sports Complex, Court 2
26 November; 13:00	21–13, 21–10			Daejeon Hanbat Sports Complex, Court 2

26 November; 15:00	Thailand	2–0	Japan	Daejeon Hanbat Sports Complex, Court 2
26 November; 15:00	21–8, 21–14			Daejeon Hanbat Sports Complex, Court 2

27 November; 13:00	South Korea	2–0	Japan	Daejeon Hanbat Sports Complex, Court 2
27 November; 13:00	21–13, 21–12			Daejeon Hanbat Sports Complex, Court 2

27 November; 15:00	Chinese Taipei	0–2	Thailand	Daejeon Hanbat Sports Complex, Court 2
27 November; 15:00	5–21, 7–21			Daejeon Hanbat Sports Complex, Court 2

28 November; 11:00	South Korea	0–2	Thailand	Daejeon Hanbat Sports Complex, Court 1
28 November; 11:00	8–21, 5–21			Daejeon Hanbat Sports Complex, Court 1

28 November; 12:00	Japan	2–0	Chinese Taipei	Daejeon Hanbat Sports Complex, Court 2
28 November; 12:00	21–16, 21–19			Daejeon Hanbat Sports Complex, Court 2

==== Group J: WQ-PM GrJ ====
Pos	Team	Pld	W	L	Pts	SW	SL	SR	SPW	SPL	SPR	Qualification
1	Vietnam	2	2	0	6	4	0	MAX	42	34	1.235	Final round
2	India	2	1	1	3	2	2	1.000	42	18	2.333	Final round
3	Malaysia	2	0	2	0	0	4	0.000	0	84	0.000	

Source: "ISTAF World Cup: India smash their way into semi-finals". Deccan Chronicle. 4 November 2017. Archived from the original on 11 June 2019.

26 November; 17:00	Vietnam	2–0	India	Daejeon Hanbat Sports Complex, Court 2
26 November; 17:00	Not Available			Daejeon Hanbat Sports Complex, Court 2

28 November; 09:00	Malaysia	0–2	India	Daejeon Hanbat Sports Complex, Court 2
28 November; 09:00	10–21, 8–21			Daejeon Hanbat Sports Complex, Court 2

28 November; 13:00	Malaysia	0–2	Vietnam	Daejeon Hanbat Sports Complex, Court 2
28 November; 13:00	18–21, 16–21			Daejeon Hanbat Sports Complex, Court 2

==== Group K: MQ-D1 GrK ====
Pos	Team	Pld	W	L	Pts	SW	SL	SR	SPW	SPL	SPR	Qualification
1	Iran	2	2	0	5	4	1	4.000	0	0	—	Final round
2	Bangladesh	2	1	1	4	3	2	1.500	0	0	—	Final round
3	Nepal	2	0	2	0	0	4	0.000	0	0	—	

Source: "ISTAF World Cup: India smash their way into semi-finals". Deccan Chronicle. 4 November 2017. Archived from the original on 11 June 2019.

26 November; 15:00	Iran	2–1	Bangladesh	Daejeon Hanbat Sports Complex, Court 1
26 November; 15:00	Not Available			Daejeon Hanbat Sports Complex, Court 1

27 November; 13:00	Nepal	0–2	Bangladesh	Daejeon Hanbat Sports Complex, Court 1
27 November; 13:00	Not Available			Daejeon Hanbat Sports Complex, Court 1

28 November; 10:00	Nepal	0–2	Iran	Daejeon Hanbat Sports Complex, Court 1
28 November; 10:00	Not Available			Daejeon Hanbat Sports Complex, Court 1

==== Group L: MQ-D1 GrL ====
Pos	Team	Pld	W	L	Pts	SW	SL	SR	SPW	SPL	SPR	Qualification
1	United States	2	2	0	6	4	0	MAX	0	0	—	Final round
2	Germany	2	1	1	3	2	2	1.000	42	24	1.750	Final round
3	Pakistan	2	0	2	0	0	4	0.000	24	42	0.571	

Source: "ISTAF World Cup: India smash their way into semi-finals". Deccan Chronicle. 4 November 2017. Archived from the original on 11 June 2019.

26 November; 17:00	Germany	2–0	Pakistan	Daejeon Hanbat Sports Complex, Court 1
26 November; 17:00	21–9, 21–15			Daejeon Hanbat Sports Complex, Court 1

27 November; 15:00	United States	2–0	Pakistan	Daejeon Hanbat Sports Complex, Court 1
27 November; 15:00	Not Available			Daejeon Hanbat Sports Complex, Court 1

28 November; 13:00	United States	2–0	Germany	Daejeon Hanbat Sports Complex, Court 1
28 November; 13:00	Not Available			Daejeon Hanbat Sports Complex, Court 1

==== Group M: MQ-PM GrM ====
Pos	Team	Pld	W	L	Pts	SW	SL	SR	SPW	SPL	SPR	Qualification
1	Thailand	2	2	0	5	4	1	4.000	97	64	1.516	Final round
2	South Korea	2	1	1	4	3	2	1.500	82	83	0.988	Final round
3	Vietnam	2	0	2	0	0	4	0.000	52	84	0.619	

Source: "ISTAF World Cup: India smash their way into semi-finals". Deccan Chronicle. 4 November 2017. Archived from the original on 11 June 2019.

26 November; 16:00	Thailand	2–0	Vietnam	Daejeon Hanbat Sports Complex, Court 1
26 November; 16:00	21–10, 21–14			Daejeon Hanbat Sports Complex, Court 1

27 November; 14:00	South Korea	2–0	Vietnam	Daejeon Hanbat Sports Complex, Court 1
27 November; 14:00	21–10, 21–18			Daejeon Hanbat Sports Complex, Court 1

28 November; 12:00	Thailand	2–1	South Korea	Daejeon Hanbat Sports Complex, Court 1
28 November; 12:00	21–10, 13–21, 21–9			Daejeon Hanbat Sports Complex, Court 1

==== Group N: MQ-PM GrN ====
Pos	Team	Pld	W	L	Pts	SW	SL	SR	SPW	SPL	SPR	Qualification
1	India	2	2	0	5	4	1	4.000	108	99	1.091	Final round
2	Malaysia	2	1	1	3	2	2	1.000	83	74	1.122	Final round
3	Japan	2	0	2	1	1	4	0.250	86	104	0.827	

Source: "ISTAF World Cup: India smash their way into semi-finals". Deccan Chronicle. 4 November 2017. Archived from the original on 11 June 2019.

27 November; 12:00	Japan	1–2	India	Daejeon Hanbat Sports Complex, Court 1
27 November; 12:00	22–20, 17–21, 19–21			Daejeon Hanbat Sports Complex, Court 1

27 November; 16:00	Malaysia	0–2	India	Daejeon Hanbat Sports Complex, Court 1
27 November; 16:00	24–25, 17–21			Daejeon Hanbat Sports Complex, Court 1

28 November; 14:00	Malaysia	2–0	Japan	Daejeon Hanbat Sports Complex, Court 1
28 November; 14:00	21–16, 21–12			Daejeon Hanbat Sports Complex, Court 1

== Mixed quadrant ==
Pos	Team	Pld	W	L	Pts	SW	SL	SR	SPW	SPL	SPR	Qualification
1	India	3	3	0	9	6	0	MAX	84	52	1.615	Winner
2	South Korea	3	2	1	5	4	3	1.333	126	116	1.086	
3	Vietnam	3	1	2	3	3	5	0.600	60	49	1.224	
4	Japan	3	0	3	1	1	6	0.167	93	154	0.604	
5	Malaysia	0	0	0	0	0	0	—	0	0	—	Withdrew

Source: "ISTAF World Cup: India smash their way into semi-finals". Deccan Chronicle. 4 November 2017. Archived from the original on 11 June 2019.

Winner
Mixed Quadrant Premier Division
2022 ISTAF World Cup
(India)
India
First title

26 November; 09:00	Japan	1–2	Vietnam	Daejeon Hanbat Sports Complex, Court 2
26 November; 09:00	14–21, 21–18, 14–21			Daejeon Hanbat Sports Complex, Court 2

26 November; 10:00	South Korea	0–2	India	Daejeon Hanbat Sports Complex, Court 2
26 November; 10:00	11–21, 19–21			Daejeon Hanbat Sports Complex, Court 2

26 November; 12:00	India	2–0	Japan	Daejeon Hanbat Sports Complex, Court 2
26 November; 12:00	21–10, 21–12			Daejeon Hanbat Sports Complex, Court 2

26 November; 13:00	South Korea	2–1	Vietnam	Daejeon Hanbat Sports Complex, Court 2
26 November; 13:00	12–21, 21–18, 21–13			Daejeon Hanbat Sports Complex, Court 2

26 November; 16:00	Vietnam	0–2	India	Daejeon Hanbat Sports Complex, Court 2
26 November; 16:00	Not Available			Daejeon Hanbat Sports Complex, Court 2

26 November; 17:00	South Korea	2–0	Japan	Daejeon Hanbat Sports Complex, Court 2
26 November; 17:00	21–11, 21–11			Daejeon Hanbat Sports Complex, Court 2

== Final round ==
=== Regu ===
==== Women: WR-PM ====
Semifinal
1A	Thailand	21	21	2
2B	Japan	8	14	0
Date: November 27, 09:00
1B	South Korea	17	14	0
2A	Vietnam	21	21	2

Final
Thailand	21	21	2
Vietnam	11	11	0

Winner
Women's Regu Premier Division
2022 ISTAF World Cup
(Thailand)
Thailand
Third title

==== Men's Division 1: MR-D1 ====
Semifinal
1C	Iran	21	21	2
2D	Germany	15	11	0
Date: November 27, 09:00
1D	United States	2
2C	Bangladesh	0

Final
Iran
United States

Winner
Men's Regu Division 1
2022 ISTAF World Cup
(United States)
United States
First title

==== Men's Premier: MR-PM ====
Semifinal
1G	Thailand	21	21	2
2H	India	6	5	0
Date: November 27, 09:00
2G	South Korea	10	15	0
1H	Malaysia	21	21	2

Final
Thailand	21	21	2
Malaysia	18	19	0

Winner
Men's Regu Premier Division
2022 ISTAF World Cup
(Thailand)
Thailand
Third title

=== Quadrant ===
==== Women: WQ-PM ====
Semifinal
1I	Thailand	21	21	–	2
2J	India	6	8	–	0
Date: 28 November 2022, 14:00
2I	South Korea	9	7	–	0
1J	Vietnam	21	21	–	2

Final
Thailand	23	21	21	2
Vietnam	25	16	14	1

Winner
Women's Quadrant Premier Division
2022 ISTAF World Cup
(Thailand)
Thailand
First title

==== Men's Division 1: MQ-D1 ====
Semifinal
1K	Iran	2
2L	Germany	0
Date: November 27, 09:00
1L	United States	2
2K	Bangladesh	0

Final
Iran	0
United States	2

Winner
Men's Quadrant Division 1
2022 ISTAF World Cup
(United States)
United States
First title

==== Men's Premier: MQ-PM ====
Semifinal
1M	Thailand	21	21	–	2
2N	Malaysia	16	17	–	0
Date: 28 November 2022, 14:00
2M	South Korea	18	21	20	1
1N	India	21	15	22	2

Final
Thailand	21	21	–	2
India	13	8	–	0

Winner
Men's Quadrant Premier Division
2022 ISTAF World Cup
(Thailand)
Thailand
First title
