= ISTAF =

ISTAF may refer to:

- ISTAF Berlin, an international athletics meet in Berlin
- International Sepaktakraw Federation, the organization that sanctions international competition in sepak takraw
