= 2026 World Cup (disambiguation) =

Topics referred to by the same term

The 2026 FIFA World Cup was the 23rd edition of the FIFA World Cup.

2026 FIFA World Cup may also refer to:

- 2026 FIFA U-17 World Cup
- 2026 FIFA U-15 World Cup & Festival
- 2026 FIFA U-20 Women's World Cup
- 2026 FIFA U-17 Women's World Cup

2026 World Cup may also refer to:

- 2026 FIBA 3x3 World Cup
  - 2026 FIBA 3x3 World Cup – Men's tournament
  - 2026 FIBA 3x3 World Cup – Women's tournament
- 2026 FIBA Women's Basketball World Cup
- 2026 Men's T20 World Cup
- 2026 Women's T20 World Cup
- 2026 PDC World Cup of Darts
- 2026 Women's FIH Hockey World Cup
- 2026 Rugby League World Cup
  - 2026 Men's Rugby League World Cup
  - 2026 Wheelchair Rugby League World Cup
  - 2026 Women's Rugby League World Cup
- 2025–26 FIS Alpine Ski World Cup
- 2026 ISTAF World Cup
- 2026 Speedway World Cup
