= Syahir Rosdi =

Malaysian sepaktakraw player

Personal information
- Full name: Mohammad Syahir bin Mohd Rosdi
- Nationality: Malaysia
- Born: 2 August 1996; Age 30
- Height: 189 cm (6 ft 2 in)

Sport
- Sport: Sepak takraw
- Position: Tekong (server)
- Team: Men's Regu Team

Mohammad Syahir bin Mohd Rosdi (born 2 August 1996) is a Malaysian sepak takraw player. In early 2026, he had received a Certificate of Distinguished International Excellence, and officially considered to be the "Best Tekong in the World" by the International Sepaktakraw Federation (ISTAF).
