= Takraw Association of Thailand =

- Sport: Sepaktakraw
- Abbreviation: TAT
- Founded: 1983
- Affiliation: International Sepaktakraw Federation (ISTAF)
- Location: Dusit District, Bangkok
- President: Thana Chaiprasit
- CEO: Boonchai Lawphiphat
- Secretary: Tanawat Prasongcharoen

Official website
- thaitakrawassociation.org
- (Thailand)

The Takraw Association of Thailand (Thai: สมาคมกีฬาตะกร้อแห่งประเทศไทย; TAT) is the national governing body for sepaktakraw in Thailand, officially found on 17 April 1983. The roles of the TAT include organizing sepaktakraw competitions in Thailand, supporting and co-ordinating sepaktakraw clubs, and managing the Thai sepaktakraw teams, organizing the domestic tournaments, Takraw Thailand League as well as the most prestigious sepaktakraw international tournament, King's Cup Sepaktakraw World Championship, which was held every year. Furthermore, in cooperation with the sepaktakraw association of Malaysia, Myanmar and Singapore, the TAT also created the standardize rules and regulations for sepaktakraw to promote and develop its growth at the international level.

The current president of The Takraw Association of Thailand is Thana Chaiprasit,

== History ==
In 1981, the executive committee of the Thai Sports Association under the Royal Patronage (TSA) passed a resolution to establish the sepaktakraw registered association under the title, “The Takraw Association of Thailand”, aiming to manage the domestic sepaktakraw-related activities. The association was granted an official license of the establishment on 17 April 1983, according to license number No. ต. 204/2526, request number 204/2526, with the former secretary of the TSA, Decha Kulbutr, as the first president, and Nopchai Wutthikamonchai as the secretary of the association.

Later on 20 August 1983, during the annual general meeting of the association, Kulbutr relinquished the position due to health problems, which caused Charouck Arirachakarran, the current president, to be elected to the said position.

== Board of directors ==
The following list is featured the current board of directors of the Takraw Association of Thailand.

Position	Name
President	Thana Chaiprasit
Vice-president	Watana Yukpan; Chalerm Chaiwatcharaporn; Thawat Mukutphongpanit; Sompong Chatawithee; Chalermpong Chalermchit
Chief executive officer	Boonchai Lawphiphat
Secretary	Tanawat Prasongcharoen

== See also ==
- International Sepaktakraw Federation
- Sport in Thailand
