= List of sporting events held in Thailand =

This is a list of sporting events held in Thailand.

== Multi-sport events ==
Games	Events	Venues
Universiade (FISU)	2007 Summer Universiade	Bangkok
Asian Games (OCA)	1966 Asian Games	Bangkok
Asian Games (OCA)	1970 Asian Games	Bangkok
Asian Games (OCA)	1978 Asian Games	Bangkok
Asian Games (OCA)	1998 Asian Games	Bangkok
Asian Indoor and Martial Arts Games (OCA)	2005 Asian Indoor Games	Bangkok
Asian Indoor and Martial Arts Games (OCA)	2009 Asian Martial Arts Games	Bangkok
Asian Beach Games (OCA)	2014 Asian Beach Games	Phuket
Southeast Asian Games (SEAGF)	1959 Southeast Asian Peninsular Games	Bangkok
Southeast Asian Games (SEAGF)	1967 Southeast Asian Peninsular Games	Bangkok
Southeast Asian Games (SEAGF)	1975 Southeast Asian Peninsular Games	Bangkok
Southeast Asian Games (SEAGF)	1985 Southeast Asian Games	Bangkok
Southeast Asian Games (SEAGF)	1995 Southeast Asian Games	Chiang Mai
Southeast Asian Games (SEAGF)	2007 Southeast Asian Games	Nakhon Ratchasima
Southeast Asian Games (SEAGF)	2025 Southeast Asian Games	Bangkok
Southeast Asian Games (SEAGF)	2025 Southeast Asian Games	Chonburi
ASEAN Para Games (APSF)	2008 ASEAN Para Games	Nakhon Ratchasima
ASEAN Para Games (APSF)	2025 ASEAN Para Games	Nakhon Ratchasima
ASEAN University Games (AUSC)	1981 ASEAN University Games	Chiang Mai
ASEAN University Games (AUSC)	1988 ASEAN University Games	Chonburi
ASEAN University Games (AUSC)	1999 ASEAN University Games	Bangkok
ASEAN University Games (AUSC)	2010 ASEAN University Games	Chiang Mai
ASEAN School Games (ASSC)	2009 ASEAN School Games	Suphan Buri
ASEAN School Games (ASSC)	2016 ASEAN School Games	Chiang Mai

== International sports federations events ==
Summer Olympics Federations

Sports	Events	Years
Archery (WA)	WA World Para-archery Championships	2013
Archery (WA)	WA World University Archery Championships	2002
Badminton (BWF)	BWF World Men's Team Championships	1976, 2018
Badminton (BWF)	BWF World Team Championships for Women	2018
Badminton (BWF)	BWF World Junior Championships	2013
Badminton (BWF)	BWF World Badminton Grand Prix Finals	1994
Badminton (BWF)	BWF Badminton World Cup	1988
Basketball (FIBA)	FIBA Under-19 World Championship for Women	2009
Boxing (AIBA)	AIBA World Boxing Championships	2003
Boxing (AIBA)	AIBA Women Boxing Championships	2018
Football (FIFA)	FIFA U-19 Women's World Championship	2004
Football (FIFA)	FIFA Futsal World Cup	2012
Motorcycle racing (FIM)	Thailand motorcycle Grand Prix	2018, 2019
Table tennis (ITTF)	ITTF World Tour Grand Finals	2014
Taekwondo (WTF)	WTF World Cup Taekwondo Team Championships	2006
Volleyball (FIVB)	FIVB Volleyball World Grand Prix	2016
Volleyball (FIVB)	FIVB Volleyball Men's U21 World Championship	1999
Volleyball (FIVB)	FIVB Volleyball Women's U20 World Championship	1995, 2003, 2007
Volleyball (FIVB)	FIVB Volleyball Boys' U19 World Championship	2003
Volleyball (FIVB)	FIVB Volleyball Girls' U18 World Championship	1997, 2009, 2013
Volleyball (FIVB)	FIVB Beach Volleyball U19 World Championships	2003
Weightlifting (IWF)	IWF World Weightlifting Championships	1997, 2007
Weightlifting (IWF)	IWF World University Weightlifting Championships	2014
Weightlifting (IWF)	IWF World Youth Weightlifting Championships	2009, 2017
Wrestling (UWW)	UWW World Beach Wrestling Championships	2012
