= 2011 ISTAF World Cup =

Sepaktakraw tournament

Tournament details
- Host country: Malaysia
- City: Kuala Lumpur
- Teams: 24 countries (from International Sepaktakraw confederations)
- Venue: Titiwangsa Stadium

Final positions
- Champions: Thailand
- Runner-up: Malaysia
- Third place: Myanmar / Singapore

The ISTAF World Cup is a competition organised by the International Sepaktakraw Federation (ISTAF) to modernise the traditional sport of Sepaktakraw. Alongside the ISTAF SuperSeries, the ISTAF World Cup is a platform to showcase the best of the sport and seeks to broaden the appeal of the sport to the international community.

The first ever ISTAF World Cup debuted in Titiwangsa Stadium, Kuala Lumpur, Malaysia during July 2011 and saw the participation of 36 international teams and a total of 180 athletes.

The winner for the 1st ISTAF World Cup (Men) was Thailand and the runner-up was Malaysia. The winner for the 1st ISTAF World Cup (Women) was Thailand and the runner-up was Vietnam.

== Men's draw ==
The first round, or group stage, saw 23 men's teams divided into 8 groups of 3 (one group had only 2 teams). Each group featured a round robin of 3 games, with each team playing against every other team in their group once. Based on points accumulated, the top 2 teams from each group advanced to the second round, or playoff stage. The host nation also advanced automatically to the playoff stage.

== Women's draw ==
The first round, or group stage, saw 11 women's teams divided into 4 groups of 3 (one group had only 2 teams). Each group featured a round robin of 3 games, with each team playing against every other team in their group once. Based on points accumulated, the top 2 teams from each group advanced to the quarter-finals, or playoff stage. The host nation also advanced automatically to the playoff stage.

== Participating countries ==
Participating countries (men)
Host
Malaysia
Group A	Group B	Group C	Group D
Thailand (Seed)	Vietnam (Seed)	Brunei (Seed)	Singapore (Seed)
Philippines	China	Australia	Germany
Bangladesh	Iran	Japan	Sri Lanka
Group E	Group F	Group G	Group H
Myanmar (Seed)	Indonesia (Seed)	South Korea (Seed)	Laos (Seed)
Chinese Taipei	United States	India	Pakistan
France	Switzerland	Cambodia	-

Participating countries (women)
Host
Malaysia
Group A	Group B	Group C	Group D
China (Seed)	Myanmar (Seed)	Vietnam (Seed)	Thailand (Seed)
Indonesia	South Korea	Philippines	Cambodia
-	Japan	India	Pakistan

== Men's results ==
=== Group A (men) ===
Group A
Rank	Country	Games played	Win	Lost	Pts
1	Thailand	2	2	0	6
2	Philippines	2	1	1	3
3	Bangladesh	2	0	2	0

21 July 2011
Thailand	3-0	Philippines
Philippines	3-0	Bangladesh
22 July 2011
Bangladesh	0-3	Thailand

=== Group B (men) ===
Group B
Rank	Country	Games played	Win	Lost	Pts
1	Vietnam	2	2	0	6
2	Iran	2	1	1	4
3	China	2	0	2	0

21 July 2011
Vietnam	3-1	Iran
Iran	3-0	China
22 July 2011
China	0-3	Vietnam

=== Group C (men) ===
Group C
Rank	Country	Games played	Win	Lost	Pts
1	Brunei	2	2	0	6
2	Japan	2	1	1	4
3	Australia	2	0	2	0

21 July 2011
Australia	0-3	Brunei
Brunei	3-1	Japan
22 July 2011
Japan	3-0	Australia

=== Group D (men) ===
Group D
Rank	Country	Games played	Win	Lost	Pts
1	Singapore	2	2	0	6
2	Germany	2	1	1	3
3	Sri Lanka	2	0	2	0

21 July 2011
Singapore	3-0	Germany
Germany	3-0	Sri Lanka
22 July 2011
Sri Lanka	0-3	Singapore

=== Group E (men) ===
Group E
Rank	Country	Games played	Win	Lost	Pts
1	Myanmar	2	2	0	6
2	Chinese Taipei	2	1	1	3
3	France	2	0	2	2

21 July 2011
Myanmar	3-0	Chinese Taipei
22 July 2011
France	0-3	Myanmar
Chinese Taipei	3-2	France

=== Group F (men) ===
Group F
Rank	Country	Games played	Win	Lost	Pts
1	Indonesia	2	2	0	6
2	United States	2	1	1	3
3	Switzerland	2	0	2	0

21 July 2011
Switzerland	0-3	United States
22 July 2011
United States	0-3	Indonesia
Indonesia	3-0	Switzerland

=== Group G (men) ===
Group G
Rank	Country	Games played	Win	Lost	Pts
1	South Korea	2	2	0	6
2	India	2	1	1	3
3	Cambodia	2	0	2	0

21 July 2011
Cambodia	0-3	South Korea
22 July 2011
India	3-0	Cambodia
South Korea	3-0	India

=== Group H (men) ===
Group H
Rank	Country	Games played	Win	Lost	Pts
1	Laos	2	2	0	6
2	Pakistan	2	0	2	0

21 July 2011
Laos	3-0	Pakistan
22 July 2011
Pakistan	0-3	Laos

=== Knock-out rounds (men) ===
Round of 16
23 July
Chinese Taipei	0
Malaysia	3
23 July
Philippines	3
Brunei	2
23 July
Singapore	3
United States	2
23 July
Vietnam	1
India	3
23 July
Thailand	3
Iran	0
23 July
Indonesia	3
Laos	2
23 July
Japan	0
South Korea	3
23 July
Germany	0
Myanmar	3

Quarter-finals
23 July
Malaysia	3
Philippines	0
23 July
Singapore	3
India	2
23 July
Thailand	3
Indonesia	0
23 July
South Korea	0
Myanmar	3

Semi-finals
24 July
Malaysia	3
Singapore	0
24 July
Thailand	3
Myanmar	0

Final
24 July
Malaysia	0
Thailand	3
Third place
-
-

== Women's results ==
=== Group A (women) ===
Group A
Rank	Country	Games played	Win	Lost	Pts
1	China	2	2	0	6
2	Indonesia	2	0	2	1

21 July 2011
Indonesia	1-3	China
22 July 2011
China	3-0	Indonesia

=== Group B (women) ===
Group B
Rank	Country	Games played	Win	Lost	Pts
1	Myanmar	2	1	1	4
2	South Korea	2	1	1	3
3	Japan	2	1	1	3

21 July 2011
Japan	0-3	Myanmar
South Korea	0-3	Japan
22 July 2011
Myanmar	1-3	South Korea

=== Group C (women) ===
Group C
Rank	Country	Games played	Win	Lost	Pts
1	India	2	2	0	6
2	Vietnam	2	1	1	5
3	Philippines	2	0	2	1

21 July 2011
Vietnam	3-0	Philippines
22 July 2011
Philippines	1-3	India
India	3-2	Vietnam

=== Group D (women) ===
Group D
Rank	Country	Games played	Win	Lost	Pts
1	Thailand	2	2	0	6
2	Cambodia	2	1	1	3
3	Pakistan	2	0	2	0

21 July 2011
Cambodia	3-0	Pakistan
Pakistan	0-3	Thailand
22 July 2011
Thailand	3-0	Cambodia

=== Knock-out rounds (women) ===
Quarter-finals
23 July
Malaysia	3
Cambodia	0
23 July
Myanmar	0
Vietnam	3
23 July
Thailand	3
South Korea	0
23 July
India	0
China	3

Semi-finals
24 July
Malaysia	1
Vietnam	3
24 July
Thailand	3
China	0

Final
24 July
Vietnam	0
Thailand	3

== Broadcast and media ==
Internationally, the ISTAF World Cup 2011 was broadcast throughout 68 countries across the seven continents:

Region	Country	Region	Country	Region	Country
South-East Asia	Brunei	Western & Northern Europe	Austria	Central & Eastern Europe	Albania
South-East Asia	Cambodia	Western & Northern Europe	Belgium	Central & Eastern Europe	Armenia
South-East Asia	Indonesia	Western & Northern Europe	Denmark	Central & Eastern Europe	Azerbaijan
South-East Asia	Malaysia	Western & Northern Europe	Finland	Central & Eastern Europe	Belarus
South-East Asia	Myanmar	Western & Northern Europe	France	Central & Eastern Europe	Bosnia-Herzegovina
South-East Asia	Philippines	Western & Northern Europe	Germany	Central & Eastern Europe	Bulgaria
South-East Asia	Singapore	Western & Northern Europe	Ireland	Central & Eastern Europe	Croatia
South-East Asia	Thailand	Western & Northern Europe	Iceland	Central & Eastern Europe	Czech Republic
South-East Asia	Vietnam	Western & Northern Europe	Luxemburg	Central & Eastern Europe	Estonia
East & South Asia	China	Western & Northern Europe	Netherlands	Central & Eastern Europe	Georgia
East & South Asia	Hong Kong	Western & Northern Europe	Norway	Central & Eastern Europe	Hungary
East & South Asia	Taiwan	Western & Northern Europe	Sweden	Central & Eastern Europe	Kazakhstan
East & South Asia	Mongolia	Western & Northern Europe	Switzerland	Central & Eastern Europe	Latvia
East & South Asia	Korea	Western & Northern Europe	United Kingdom	Central & Eastern Europe	Lithuania
East & South Asia	Sri Lanka	Southern Europe	Cyprus	Central & Eastern Europe	Macedonia
Oceania	Australia	Southern Europe	Greece	Central & Eastern Europe	Maldova
Oceania	New Zealand	Southern Europe	Italy	Central & Eastern Europe	Montenegro
Oceania	Fiji	Southern Europe	Lebanon	Central & Eastern Europe	Poland
Oceania	Papua New Guinea	Southern Europe	Malta	Central & Eastern Europe	Romania
Oceania	Tonga	Southern Europe	Portugal	Central & Eastern Europe	Russia
North America	USA	Southern Europe	Spain	Central & Eastern Europe	Serbia
South America	Brazil	Southern Europe	Turkey	Central & Eastern Europe	Slovak Republic
-	-	Southern Europe	Israel	Central & Eastern Europe	Slovenia
-	-	-	-	Central & Eastern Europe	Ukraine
