= ISTAF World Cup =

- Founded: 2011; 15 years ago
- Region: International (ISTAF)
- Teams: 32 (current)
- 2026 ISTAF World Cup

ISTAF World Cup is an indoor international sepak takraw competition conducted by the International Sepaktakraw Federation (ISTAF), contested by men's and women's national teams. The first championships was organized in 2011 in Kuala Lumpur, Malaysia, where 23 male and 13 female teams participated. In 2015, the next edition was scheduled, which was postponed due to the Southeast Asian Games. It was not until 2017 in Hyderabad (India) that the second edition took place. Most of the events have been won by Thailand.

The tournament consists of two categories including men's and women's, each category will have preliminary group stages, before moving on to the knock-out rounds. The first-ever ISTAF World Cup is held in Malaysia in July 2011. The event has been being scheduled to be held every four years, nevertheless, the second edition, which was originally programmed to be held in 2015 in Goa, India was postponed due to a possible clash of dates with the 2015 King's Cup Sepaktakraw World Championship and the 2015 Southeast Asian Games, and was later reprogrammed to be conducted in 2017 and moved the venue to Hyderabad instead. The 2021 ISTAF World Cup was postponed to 2022 due to the COVID-19 pandemic as well. It was also postponed to 2024 and held in Malaysia.

Thailand is the most successful country in the tournament by winning first place in all categories since the establishment of the tournament.

== Results summary ==
=== Team Regu ===
==== Men ====
Year	Host	Final			Third place		
Year	Host	Champions	Score	Runner-up	Third place		
2011	(Malaysia); Kuala Lumpur	Thailand	3–0	Malaysia	Singapore	and	Myanmar
2017	(India); Hyderabad	Thailand	3–0	Malaysia	India	and	Singapore
2022	(South Korea); Daejeon	Not held					
2024	(Malaysia); Kuala Lumpur	Thailand	2–1	Malaysia	Indonesia	and	South Korea
2025	(India); Patna	Not held					
2026	(Malaysia); Kuala Lumpur						

==== Women ====
Year	Host	Final			Third place		
Year	Host	Champions	Score	Runner-up	Third place		
2011	(Malaysia); Kuala Lumpur	Thailand	3–0	Vietnam	Malaysia	and	China
2017	(India); Hyderabad	Thailand	2–0	Vietnam	Malaysia	and	Iran
2022	(South Korea); Daejeon	Not held					
2024	(Malaysia); Kuala Lumpur	Not held					
2025	(India); Patna	Not held					

=== Regu ===
==== Men ====
Year	Host	Final			Third place		
Year	Host	Champions	Score	Runner-up	Third place		
2011	(Malaysia); Kuala Lumpur	Not held					
2017	(India); Hyderabad	Not held					
2022	(South Korea); Daejeon	Thailand	2–0	Malaysia	South Korea	and	India
2024	(Malaysia); Kuala Lumpur	Malaysia	2–0	Thailand	Philippines	and	Myanmar
2025	(India); Patna	India	2–1	Japan	Singapore	and	Iran
2026

==== Women ====
Year	Host	Final			Third place		
Year	Host	Champions	Score	Runner-up	Third place		
2011	(Malaysia); Kuala Lumpur	Not held					
2017	(India); Hyderabad	Not held					
2022	(South Korea); Daejeon	Thailand	2–0	Vietnam	South Korea	and	Japan
2024	(Malaysia); Kuala Lumpur	Not held					
2025	(India); Patna	Thailand	2–0	Vietnam	India	and	Malaysia

=== Double ===
==== Men ====
Year	Host	Final			Third place		
Year	Host	Champions	Score	Runner-up	Third place		
2011	(Malaysia); Kuala Lumpur	Not held					
2017	(India); Hyderabad	Not held					
2022	(South Korea); Daejeon	Not held					
2024	(Malaysia); Kuala Lumpur	Malaysia	2–0	Thailand	Myanmar	and	Indonesia
2025	(India); Patna	Thailand	2–1	Myanmar	Malaysia	and	India

==== Women ====
Year	Host	Final			Third place		
Year	Host	Champions	Score	Runner-up	Third place		
2011	(Malaysia); Kuala Lumpur	Not held					
2017	(India); Hyderabad	Not held					
2022	(South Korea); Daejeon	Not held					
2024	(Malaysia); Kuala Lumpur	Not held					
2025	(India); Patna	Myanmar	2–1	India	Japan	and	Iran

=== Quadrant ===
==== Men ====
Year	Host	Final			Third place		
Year	Host	Champions	Score	Runner-up	Third place		
2011	(Malaysia); Kuala Lumpur	Not held					
2017	(India); Hyderabad	Not held					
2022	(South Korea); Daejeon	Thailand	2–0	India	South Korea	and	Malaysia
2024	(Malaysia); Kuala Lumpur	Not held					
2025	(India); Patna	Thailand	2–0	Vietnam	Myanmar	and	India

==== Women ====
Year	Host	Final			Third place		
Year	Host	Champions	Score	Runner-up	Third place		
2011	(Malaysia); Kuala Lumpur	Not held					
2017	(India); Hyderabad	Not held					
2022	(South Korea); Daejeon	Thailand	2–1	Vietnam	South Korea	and	India
2024	(Malaysia); Kuala Lumpur	Not held					
2025	(India); Patna	Vietnam	2–1	Thailand	India	and	Malaysia

==== Mixed ====
Year	Host	Final			Third place		
Year	Host	Champions	Score	Runner-up	Third place		
2011	(Malaysia); Kuala Lumpur	Not held					
2017	(India); Hyderabad	Not held					
2022	(South Korea); Daejeon	India	RR	South Korea	Japan	and	Vietnam
2024	(Malaysia); Kuala Lumpur	Not held					
2025	(India); Patna	Thailand	2–0	Myanmar	India	and	Vietnam

== Overall medal table ==
Premier events:

Rank	Nation	Gold	Silver	Bronze	Total
1	Thailand	13	3	0	16
2	Malaysia	2	4	6	12
3	India	2	2	8	12
4	Vietnam	1	6	2	9
5	Myanmar	1	2	4	7
6	South Korea	0	1	5	6
7	Japan	0	1	3	4
8	Iran	0	0	3	3
8	Singapore	0	0	3	3
10	Indonesia	0	0	2	2
11	China	0	0	1	1
11	Philippines	0	0	1	1
Totals (12 entries)		19	19	38	76

Medals in Division 1 events: Iran - 2 gold, 2 silver; United States - 2 gold; Chinese Taipei - 2 silver; Bangladesh - 3 bronze; Germany - 3 bronze; Nepal - 2 bronze.

Participating nations with no medals in either division: Australia, Brazil, Brunei, Cambodia, France, Italy, Laos, New Zealand, Pakistan, Poland, Saudi Arabia, Sri Lanka, Switzerland.

Nations who entered at least once, but withdrew without competing: Belgium, United Kingdom.
