= 2017 ISTAF World Cup =

Sepaktakraw event

Tournament details
- Host country: India
- City: Hyderabad
- Dates: 2–5 November 2017
- Teams: 20 countries (from International Sepaktakraw confederations)
- Venue: G. M. C. Balayogi Indoor Stadium

Final positions
- Champions: Men: Thailand; Women: Thailand
- Runner-up: Men: Malaysia; Women: Vietnam
- Third place: Men: Singapore/ India; Women: Malaysia/ Iran

The 2017 ISTAF World Cup is the second edition of the ISTAF World Cup, which was conducted by the International Sepaktakraw Federation (ISTAF). The competition was originally scheduled to be held in 2015 in Goa, India. However, due to a possible clash of dates with the 2015 King's Cup Sepaktakraw World Championship and the 2015 Southeast Asian Games, the tournament was later rescheduled and moved the venue to Hyderabad with the support of the India Sports Council. The event was organised at G. M. C. Balayogi Indoor Stadium of Hyderabad, during 2–5 November 2017. Twenty-six national teams from 17 ISTAF membership countries participated, with only three countries outside Asia, named Brazil, France, and Germany. Brunei, Belgium, United Kingdom, South Korea, and the Philippines were early expected to join the competition but was absent for undisclosed reasons, while Indonesia and Pakistan national team withdrew on the first day of the event.

Thailand won first place in both men and women categories, Malaysia and Vietnam were ranked second in men's and women's events respectively. Meanwhile, the third-place of each category included two teams, India alongside Singapore in men's, and Iran together with Malaysia in women's.

== Participating countries ==
Men category
Group A	Group B	Group C	Group D
Thailand (1st)	Malaysia (2nd)	India (Host)	Singapore (3rd)
Japan	Myanmar (3rd)	Iran	Pakistan
Nepal	Bangladesh	France	China
—N/a	—N/a	Germany	Brazil
Women category
Group E	Group F	Group G	Group H
(1st) Thailand	Vietnam (2nd)	Malaysia (3rd)	India (Host)
China (3rd)	Indonesia	Sri Lanka	Japan
Pakistan	Nepal	Iran	Bangladesh

== Group stage ==
=== Group A ===
Pos	Team	Pld	W	L	Pts	SW	SL	SR	SPW	SPL	SPR	Qualification
1	Thailand	2	2	0	6	4	0	MAX	84	27	3.111	Final round
2	Japan	2	1	1	3	2	2	1.000	59	69	0.855	Final round
3	Nepal	2	0	2	0	0	4	0.000	37	84	0.440	

Source: "ISTAF World Cup: India smash their way into semi-finals". Deccan Chronicle. 4 November 2017. Archived from the original on 11 June 2019.
Rules for classification: Group standing procedure

2 November; 18:30	Nepal	0–2	Thailand	G. M. C. Balayogi Indoor Stadium, Hyderabad
2 November; 18:30	(4–21, 6–21); P2 Report			G. M. C. Balayogi Indoor Stadium, Hyderabad

2 November; 18:30	Japan	2–0	Nepal	G. M. C. Balayogi Indoor Stadium, Hyderabad
2 November; 18:30	(21–15, 21–12); P2 Report			G. M. C. Balayogi Indoor Stadium, Hyderabad

2 November; 18:30	Japan	0–2	Thailand	G. M. C. Balayogi Indoor Stadium, Hyderabad
2 November; 18:30	(7–21, 10–21); P2 Report			G. M. C. Balayogi Indoor Stadium, Hyderabad

=== Group B ===
Pos	Team	Pld	W	L	Pts	SW	SL	SR	SPW	SPL	SPR	Qualification
1	Malaysia	2	2	0	6	4	0	MAX	84	48	1.750	Final round
2	Myanmar	2	1	1	3	2	2	1.000	65	53	1.226	Final round
3	Bangladesh	2	0	2	0	0	4	0.000	36	84	0.429	

Source: "ISTAF World Cup: India smash their way into semi-finals". Deccan Chronicle. 4 November 2017. Archived from the original on 11 June 2019.
Rules for classification: Group standing procedure

2 November; 18:30	Bangladesh	0–2	Malaysia	G. M. C. Balayogi Indoor Stadium, Hyderabad
2 November; 18:30	(10–21, 15–21); P2 Report			G. M. C. Balayogi Indoor Stadium, Hyderabad

2 November; 18:30	Bangladesh	0–2	Myanmar	G. M. C. Balayogi Indoor Stadium, Hyderabad
2 November; 18:30	(3–21, 8–21); P2 Report			G. M. C. Balayogi Indoor Stadium, Hyderabad

2 November; 18:30	Malaysia	2–0	Myanmar	G. M. C. Balayogi Indoor Stadium, Hyderabad
2 November; 18:30	(21–9, 21–14); P2 Report			G. M. C. Balayogi Indoor Stadium, Hyderabad

=== Group C ===
Pos	Team	Pld	W	L	Pts	SW	SL	SR	SPW	SPL	SPR	Qualification
1	India	3	3	0	9	6	0	MAX	126	68	1.853	Final round
2	Iran	3	2	1	6	4	2	2.000	119	84	1.417	Final round
3	France	3	1	2	3	2	4	0.500	82	122	0.672	
4	Germany	3	0	3	0	0	6	0.000	73	126	0.579	

Source: "ISTAF World Cup: India smash their way into semi-finals". Deccan Chronicle. 4 November 2017. Archived from the original on 11 June 2019.
Rules for classification: Group standing procedure

2 November; 18:30	France	0–2	India	G. M. C. Balayogi Indoor Stadium, Hyderabad
2 November; 18:30	(6–21, 10–21); P2 Report			G. M. C. Balayogi Indoor Stadium, Hyderabad

2 November; 18:30	Germany	0–2	Iran	G. M. C. Balayogi Indoor Stadium, Hyderabad
2 November; 18:30	(14–21, 4–21); P2 Report			G. M. C. Balayogi Indoor Stadium, Hyderabad

2 November; 18:30	Germany	0–2	India	G. M. C. Balayogi Indoor Stadium, Hyderabad
2 November; 18:30	(10–21, 7–21); P2 Report			G. M. C. Balayogi Indoor Stadium, Hyderabad

3 November; 18:30	France	0–2	Iran	G. M. C. Balayogi Indoor Stadium, Hyderabad
3 November; 18:30	(17–21, 7–21); P2 Report			G. M. C. Balayogi Indoor Stadium, Hyderabad

3 November; 18:30	India	2–0	Iran	G. M. C. Balayogi Indoor Stadium, Hyderabad
3 November; 18:30	(21–16, 21–19); P2 Report			G. M. C. Balayogi Indoor Stadium, Hyderabad

3 November; 18:30	France	2–0	Germany	G. M. C. Balayogi Indoor Stadium, Hyderabad
3 November; 18:30	(21–19, 21–19); P2 Report			G. M. C. Balayogi Indoor Stadium, Hyderabad

=== Group D ===
Pos	Team	Pld	W	L	Pts	SW	SL	SR	SPW	SPL	SPR	Qualification
1	Singapore	3	3	0	9	6	0	MAX	127	36	3.528	Final round
2	China	3	2	1	6	4	2	2.000	109	64	1.703	Final round
3	Brazil	3	1	2	3	2	4	0.500	74	84	0.881	
4	Pakistan	3	0	3	0	0	6	0.000	0	126	0.000	Withdrawn

Source: "ISTAF World Cup: India smash their way into semi-finals". Deccan Chronicle. 4 November 2017. Archived from the original on 11 June 2019.
Rules for classification: Group standing procedure

2 November; 18:30	Brazil	2–0	Pakistan	G. M. C. Balayogi Indoor Stadium, Hyderabad
2 November; 18:30	(21–0, 21–0); P2 Report			G. M. C. Balayogi Indoor Stadium, Hyderabad

2 November; 18:30	China	0–2	Singapore	G. M. C. Balayogi Indoor Stadium, Hyderabad
2 November; 18:30	(20–22, 5–21); P2 Report			G. M. C. Balayogi Indoor Stadium, Hyderabad

2 November; 18:30	China	2–1	Pakistan	G. M. C. Balayogi Indoor Stadium, Hyderabad
2 November; 18:30	(21–0, 21–0); P2 Report			G. M. C. Balayogi Indoor Stadium, Hyderabad

3 November; 18:30	Brazil	0–2	Singapore	G. M. C. Balayogi Indoor Stadium, Hyderabad
3 November; 18:30	(3–21, 8–21); P2 Report			G. M. C. Balayogi Indoor Stadium, Hyderabad

3 November; 18:30	Brazil	0–2	China	G. M. C. Balayogi Indoor Stadium, Hyderabad
3 November; 18:30	(14–21, 7–21); P2 Report			G. M. C. Balayogi Indoor Stadium, Hyderabad

3 November; 18:30	Pakistan	0–2	Singapore	G. M. C. Balayogi Indoor Stadium, Hyderabad
3 November; 18:30	(0–21, 0–21); P2 Report			G. M. C. Balayogi Indoor Stadium, Hyderabad

=== Group E ===
Pos	Team	Pld	W	L	Pts	SW	SL	SR	SPW	SPL	SPR	Qualification
1	Thailand	2	2	0	6	4	0	MAX	84	14	6.000	Final round
2	China	2	1	1	3	2	2	1.000	56	69	0.812	Final round
3	Pakistan	2	0	2	0	0	4	0.000	0	84	0.000	Withdrawn

Source: "ISTAF World Cup: India smash their way into semi-finals". Deccan Chronicle. 4 November 2017. Archived from the original on 11 June 2019.
Rules for classification: Group standing procedure

2 November; 18:30	Pakistan	0–2	Thailand	G. M. C. Balayogi Indoor Stadium, Hyderabad
2 November; 18:30	(0–21, 0–21); P2 Report			G. M. C. Balayogi Indoor Stadium, Hyderabad

2 November; 18:30	China	2–0	Pakistan	G. M. C. Balayogi Indoor Stadium, Hyderabad
2 November; 18:30	(21–0, 21–0); P2 Report			G. M. C. Balayogi Indoor Stadium, Hyderabad

2 November; 18:30	China	0–2	Thailand	G. M. C. Balayogi Indoor Stadium, Hyderabad
2 November; 18:30	(6–21, 8–21); P2 Report			G. M. C. Balayogi Indoor Stadium, Hyderabad

=== Group F ===
Pos	Team	Pld	W	L	Pts	SW	SL	SR	SPW	SPL	SPR	Qualification
1	Vietnam	2	2	0	6	4	0	MAX	84	18	4.667	Final round
2	Nepal	2	1	1	3	2	2	1.000	60	42	1.429	Final round
3	Indonesia	2	0	2	0	0	4	0.000	0	84	0.000	Withdrawn

Source: "ISTAF World Cup: India smash their way into semi-finals". Deccan Chronicle. 4 November 2017. Archived from the original on 11 June 2019.
Rules for classification: Group standing procedure

2 November; 18:30	Indonesia	0–2	Vietnam	G. M. C. Balayogi Indoor Stadium, Hyderabad
2 November; 18:30	(0–21, 0–21); P2 Report			G. M. C. Balayogi Indoor Stadium, Hyderabad

2 November; 18:30	Indonesia	0–2	Nepal	G. M. C. Balayogi Indoor Stadium, Hyderabad
2 November; 18:30	(0–21, 0–21); P2 Report			G. M. C. Balayogi Indoor Stadium, Hyderabad

2 November; 18:30	Nepal	0–2	Vietnam	G. M. C. Balayogi Indoor Stadium, Hyderabad
2 November; 18:30	(9–21, 9–21); P2 Report			G. M. C. Balayogi Indoor Stadium, Hyderabad

=== Group G ===
Pos	Team	Pld	W	L	Pts	SW	SL	SR	SPW	SPL	SPR	Qualification
1	Malaysia	2	2	0	6	4	0	MAX	84	47	1.787	Final round
2	Iran	2	1	1	3	2	2	1.000	76	52	1.462	Final round
3	Sri Lanka	2	0	2	0	0	4	0.000	23	84	0.274	

Source: "ISTAF World Cup: India smash their way into semi-finals". Deccan Chronicle. 4 November 2017. Archived from the original on 11 June 2019.
Rules for classification: Group standing procedure

2 November; 18:30	Malaysia	2–0	Sri Lanka	G. M. C. Balayogi Indoor Stadium, Hyderabad
2 November; 18:30	(21–6, 21–7); P2 Report			G. M. C. Balayogi Indoor Stadium, Hyderabad

2 November; 18:30	Iran	2–0	Sri Lanka	G. M. C. Balayogi Indoor Stadium, Hyderabad
2 November; 18:30	(21–5, 21–5); P2 Report			G. M. C. Balayogi Indoor Stadium, Hyderabad

2 November; 18:30	Iran	0–2	Malaysia	G. M. C. Balayogi Indoor Stadium, Hyderabad
2 November; 18:30	(18–21, 16–21); P2 Report			G. M. C. Balayogi Indoor Stadium, Hyderabad

=== Group H ===
Pos	Team	Pld	W	L	Pts	SW	SL	SR	SPW	SPL	SPR	Qualification
1	India	2	2	0	6	4	0	MAX	85	52	1.635	Final round
2	Japan	2	1	1	3	2	2	1.000	78	56	1.393	Final round
3	Bangladesh	2	0	2	0	0	4	0.000	29	84	0.345	

Source: "ISTAF World Cup: India smash their way into semi-finals". Deccan Chronicle. 4 November 2017. Archived from the original on 11 June 2019.
Rules for classification: Group standing procedure

2 November; 18:30	Bangladesh	0–2	India	G. M. C. Balayogi Indoor Stadium, Hyderabad
2 November; 18:30	(21–8, 21–8); P2 Report			G. M. C. Balayogi Indoor Stadium, Hyderabad

2 November; 18:30	Bangladesh	0–2	Japan	G. M. C. Balayogi Indoor Stadium, Hyderabad
2 November; 18:30	(6–21, 7–21); P2 Report			G. M. C. Balayogi Indoor Stadium, Hyderabad

2 November; 18:30	Japan	0–2	India	G. M. C. Balayogi Indoor Stadium, Hyderabad
2 November; 18:30	(16–21, 20–22); P2 Report			G. M. C. Balayogi Indoor Stadium, Hyderabad

== Final round ==
=== Men ===
Fifth place
B2	Myanmar	2
C2	Iran	1
Seventh place
D2	China	0
A2	Japan	2

Consolation semifinals
B2	Myanmar	2
D2	China	1
C2	Iran	2
A2	Japan	1

Quarterfinals
A1	Thailand	2
B2	Myanmar	0
D1	Singapore	2
C2	Iran	0
C1	India	2
D2	China	0
B1	Malaysia	2
A2	Japan	0

Semifinals
A1	Thailand	2
D1	Singapore	0
C1	India	0
B1	Malaysia	2

Final
A1	Thailand	2
B1	Malaysia	0

Quarter-finals

3 November; 14:30	Myanmar	0–2	Thailand	G. M. C. Balayogi Indoor Stadium, Hyderabad
3 November; 14:30	(5–21, 14–21); P2 Report			G. M. C. Balayogi Indoor Stadium, Hyderabad

3 November; 15:30	Japan	0–2	Malaysia	G. M. C. Balayogi Indoor Stadium, Hyderabad
3 November; 15:30	(11–21, 13–21); P2 Report			G. M. C. Balayogi Indoor Stadium, Hyderabad

3 November; 16:30	China	0–2	India	G. M. C. Balayogi Indoor Stadium, Hyderabad
3 November; 16:30	(17–21, 14–21); P2 Report			G. M. C. Balayogi Indoor Stadium, Hyderabad

3 November; 17:30	Iran	0–2	Singapore	G. M. C. Balayogi Indoor Stadium, Hyderabad
3 November; 17:30	(12–21, 19–21); P2 Report			G. M. C. Balayogi Indoor Stadium, Hyderabad

Semi-finals

4 November; 14:30	Singapore	0–2	Thailand	G. M. C. Balayogi Indoor Stadium, Hyderabad
4 November; 14:30	(5–21, 8–21); P2 Report			G. M. C. Balayogi Indoor Stadium, Hyderabad

4 November; 15:30	India	0–2	Malaysia	G. M. C. Balayogi Indoor Stadium, Hyderabad
4 November; 15:30	(17–21, 8–21); P2 Report			G. M. C. Balayogi Indoor Stadium, Hyderabad

Final

5 November; 14:30	Malaysia	0–2	Thailand	G. M. C. Balayogi Indoor Stadium, Hyderabad
5 November; 14:30	(19–21, 21–23); P2 Report			G. M. C. Balayogi Indoor Stadium, Hyderabad

=== Women ===
Fifth place
F2	Nepal	0
E2	China	2
Seventh place
H1	India	2
H2	Japan	0

Consolation semifinals
F2	Nepal	0
H1	India	2
E2	China	2
H2	Japan	0

Quarterfinals
E1	Thailand	2
F2	Nepal	0
H1	India	2
G2	Iran	0
F1	Vietnam	2
E2	China	0
G1	Malaysia	2
H2	Japan	0

Semifinals
E1	Thailand	2
G2	Iran	0
F1	Vietnam	2
G1	Malaysia	1

Final
E1	Thailand	2
F1	Vietnam	0

Quarter-finals

3 November; 8:30	Nepal	0–2	Thailand	G. M. C. Balayogi Indoor Stadium, Hyderabad
3 November; 8:30	(2–21, 6–21); P2 Report			G. M. C. Balayogi Indoor Stadium, Hyderabad

3 November; 9:30	China	0–2	Vietnam	G. M. C. Balayogi Indoor Stadium, Hyderabad
3 November; 9:30	(16–21, 14–21); P2 Report			G. M. C. Balayogi Indoor Stadium, Hyderabad

3 November; 10:30	Japan	0–2	Malaysia	G. M. C. Balayogi Indoor Stadium, Hyderabad
3 November; 10:30	(13–21, 14–21); P2 Report			G. M. C. Balayogi Indoor Stadium, Hyderabad

3 November; 11:30	Iran	2–0	India	G. M. C. Balayogi Indoor Stadium, Hyderabad
3 November; 11:30	(21–12, 21–19); P2 Report			G. M. C. Balayogi Indoor Stadium, Hyderabad

Semi-finals

4 November; 12:30	Iran	0–2	Thailand	G. M. C. Balayogi Indoor Stadium, Hyderabad
4 November; 12:30	(10–21, 13–21); P2 Report			G. M. C. Balayogi Indoor Stadium, Hyderabad

4 November; 13:30	Malaysia	1–2	Vietnam	G. M. C. Balayogi Indoor Stadium, Hyderabad
4 November; 13:30	(11–21, 21–19, 21–19); P2 Report			G. M. C. Balayogi Indoor Stadium, Hyderabad

Final

5 November; 13:30	Thailand	2–0	Vietnam	G. M. C. Balayogi Indoor Stadium, Hyderabad
5 November; 13:30	(19–21, 21–23); P2 Report			G. M. C. Balayogi Indoor Stadium, Hyderabad

== Final standings ==
Men category

Rank	Team
1st place, gold medalist(s)	Thailand
2nd place, silver medalist(s)	Malaysia
3rd place, bronze medalist(s)	India; Singapore
5	Myanmar
6	Iran
7	China
8	Japan
9	Bangladesh; Brazil; France; Germany; Nepal

Women category

Rank	Team
1st place, gold medalist(s)	Thailand
2nd place, silver medalist(s)	Vietnam
3rd place, bronze medalist(s)	Iran; Malaysia
5	China
6	Nepal
7	India
8	Japan
9	Bangladesh; Sri Lanka

Summary

2017 Men's ISTAF World Cup

Thailand
Second title

2017 Women's ISTAF World Cup

Thailand
Second title
