= International Sepaktakraw Federation =

Sports' world governing body

- Abbreviation: ISTAF
- Formation: 1988
- Founder: Asian Sepaktakraw Federation (ASTAF)
- Type: Sports federation
- Headquarters: Bangkok, Thailand
- Members: 54 national associations
- Official language: English
- President: (Thailand) Boonchai Lorhpipat
- Secretary General: (Singapore) Abdul Halim Bin Kader
- Website: https://sepaktakraw.one/

The International Sepaktakraw Federation, commonly known as ISTAF, is the international governing body for the sport of Sepak takraw, which was formed in 1988 with five founding member countries including Malaysia, Thailand, Singapore, Indonesia and Myanmar, officially based in Thailand and with its secretariat in Singapore. The current President is Boonchai Lorhpipat of Thailand. Its main goal currently is to spread Sepak takraw into 75 different countries and ultimately make it an Olympic sport by 2026. As of April 2020, the federation consists of about 50 member national associations, mostly in Asia-Oceania, 13 of which are on provisional status.

Under ISTAF guidance, Sepak takraw has become the official sport at the South-East Asian Games since 1965 and has uninterrupted medal status at the Asian Games since 1990. It was additionally introduced as a demonstration sport at the 2009 World Games in Republic of China. The federation also launched its own international tournaments in 2011, namely ISTAF World Cup and ISTAF SuperSeries (ISS), in which Thailand has won the most medals for. However, to secure the goal for the Olympic Games, the federation have to fulfill the requirements of the International Olympic Committee (IOC): Any featured sport must be popularly played in at least 75 countries around the globe, and to be recognised by IOC as well as categorized as ARISF membership, the federation must fulfil certain criteria which include implementing the World Anti-Doping Agency Code, Olympic Movement Code as well as having a minimum of 50 associated national federations from at least three continents.

Sepak takraw is a sport which originated from Southeast Asia. It is played similarly to volleyball but players use their feet, knees, chest and head to carry a rattan ball over the net. It is a spectator sport that contains elements of volleyball, football, martial arts and gymnastics.

== Organization ==
=== Key office-holders ===
President: MG Dr. Charouck Arirachakaran

Secretary General: Dato Abdul Halim Bin Kader, BBM

=== National Association ===
The ISTAF currently consists of 2 continental federation members, namely the Asian Sepaktakraw Federation (ASTAF) and the Federation of European Sepak Takraw Associations (FESTA), with 54 national associations under its membership, including;

Asia & Oceania (30)

- Afghanistan
- Australia
- Bangladesh
- Brunei
- Cambodia
- China
- Chinese Taipei
- Hong Kong
- India
- Iran
- Iraq
- Indonesia
- Japan
- South Korea
- Kyrgyzstan
- Laos
- Macau
- Mongolia
- Myanmar
- Nepal
- New Zealand
- Oman
- Philippines
- Pakistan
- Malaysia
- Sri Lanka
- Singapore
- Tajikistan
- Thailand
- Vietnam

North America (3)

- Canada
- Puerto Rico
- United States

South America (3)

- Argentina
- Brazil
- Colombia

Africa (2)

- South Africa
- Sudan

Europe (16)

- Belgium
- Denmark
- France
- Finland
- Germany
- Hungary
- Italy
- Ireland
- Malta
- Poland
- Portugal
- Russia
- Serbia
- Switzerland
- United Kingdom
- Turkey

== International tournaments ==
ISTAF is responsible for Sepaktakraw's major international tournaments, notably the ISTAF SuperSeries (ISS) and ISTAF World Cup (IWC). Sepaktakraw is also a medal sport since 1990 in the Asian Games and has been an ever-present in the SEA Games from 1967 onwards. However, out of all the international competitions, the King's Cup Sepaktakraw World Championship is considered the most prestigious tournament. The event was organized by the Takraw Association of Thailand since 1985.

All international regu tournaments approved by the ISTAF might apply to the federation to estimate the world ranking points. The world ranking points available for any international competition will be determined by ISTAF in its sole discretion, taking into account various factors, including the rankings of the participating teams. The points are valid for 12 months, except for the ISTAF World Cup world ranking points, which are valid for 24 months. The rankings will be updated and online published on the first day of each calendar month. Currently, the world ranking was calculated from the regu performances in three ISTAF-approved international tournaments namely; ISTAF SuperSeries (ISS), ISTAF World Cup (IWC), and the King's Cup.

Sepaktakraw World Ranking Index
Position	ISTAF World Cup	ISTAF SuperSeries	Other International Competition
Winner	500	250	150
Runner-up	375	200	130
Semi-finals	280	175	110
Qualifying	200	150	90

=== ISTAF World Cup ===
The tournament consists of two categories including men's and women's, each category will have preliminary group stages, before moving on to the knock-out rounds. The first-ever ISTAF World Cup is held in Malaysia in July 2011. The event has been being scheduled to be held every four years, nevertheless, the second edition, which was originally programmed to be held in 2015 in Goa, India, was postponed due to a possible clash of dates with the 2015 King's Cup Sepaktakraw World Championship and the 2015 Southeast Asian Games, and was later reprogrammed to be conducted in 2017 and moved the venue to Hyderabad instead. The 2021 ISTAF World Cup was postponed to 2022 due to the COVID-19 pandemic as well.

Thailand is the most successful country in the tournament by winning first place in all categories since the establishment of the tournament.

=== ISTAF SuperSeries (ISS) ===
The ISTAF SuperSeries (ISS) is an elite international tournament for the sport of Sepaktakraw. The competition is held in a grand prix format whereby national teams compete in a series of events during a season. Their performance will then be cumulated to determine the overall winner for the season. Its inaugural tournament was held in Bangkok, Thailand during 8–11 September 2011. The finals of ISS 2011/2012 see Thailand being crowned the overall champion for both men and women in front of their home crowd in Bangkok.

== See also ==
- ISTAF World Cup
- ISTAF SuperSeries
