= Cuju =

Ancient Chinese competitive ball game

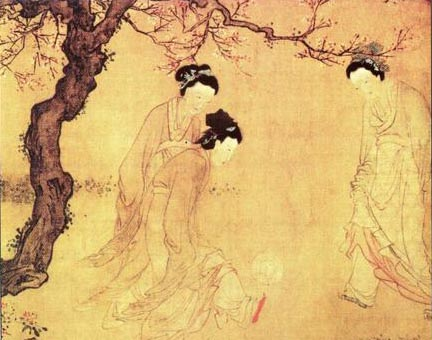
- Chinese women playing cuju, by the Chinese painter Du Jin during Ming Dynasty period

Chinese name
- Chinese: 蹴鞠
- Literal meaning: "kick ball"
Transcriptions
Standard Mandarin
- Hanyu Pinyin: cùjū
- Bopomofo: ㄘㄨˋ ㄐㄩ
- Gwoyeu Romatzyh: tsuhjiu
- Wade–Giles: ts‘u^{4}-chü^{1}
- Yale Romanization: tsùjyū
- IPA: [tsʰû.tɕý]
Wu
- Wugniu: tshoq^{7} cioq^{7}
- IPA: Shanghainese: [tsʰoʔ˧ tɕioʔ˦]
Hakka
- Romanization: tsiok-giok
Yue: Cantonese
- Yale Romanization: chūkgūk
- Jyutping: cuk^{1} guk^{1}
- IPA: [tsʰʊk̚˥.kʊk̚˥]
Southern Min
- Hokkien POJ: chiok-kiok
Middle Chinese
- Middle Chinese: tshjuwk gjuwk (Baxter)
Old Chinese
- Zhengzhang: /*sʰuɡ ɡuɡ/

Korean name
- Hangul: 축국
- Hanja: 蹴鞠
Transcriptions
- Revised Romanization: chukguk

Japanese name
- Kanji: 蹴鞠
- Hiragana: しゅうきく
Transcriptions
- Romanization: shūkiku

Cuju or ts‘u-chü is an ancient Chinese football game that resembles a mix of basketball, association football, and volleyball. FIFA cites cuju as one the earliest form of a kicking game for which there is documentary evidence, drawing references from a military manual from the Han dynasty.

It is a competitive game that involves both teams trying to kick a ball through an opening into a central hoop without the use of hands whilst ensuring the ball does not touch the ground. This is similar to how hacky sack is played today. Descriptions of the game date back to the Han dynasty, with a Chinese military work from the 3rd–2nd century BC describing it as an exercise. It was also played in other East Asian countries such as Japan and Korea.

== History ==
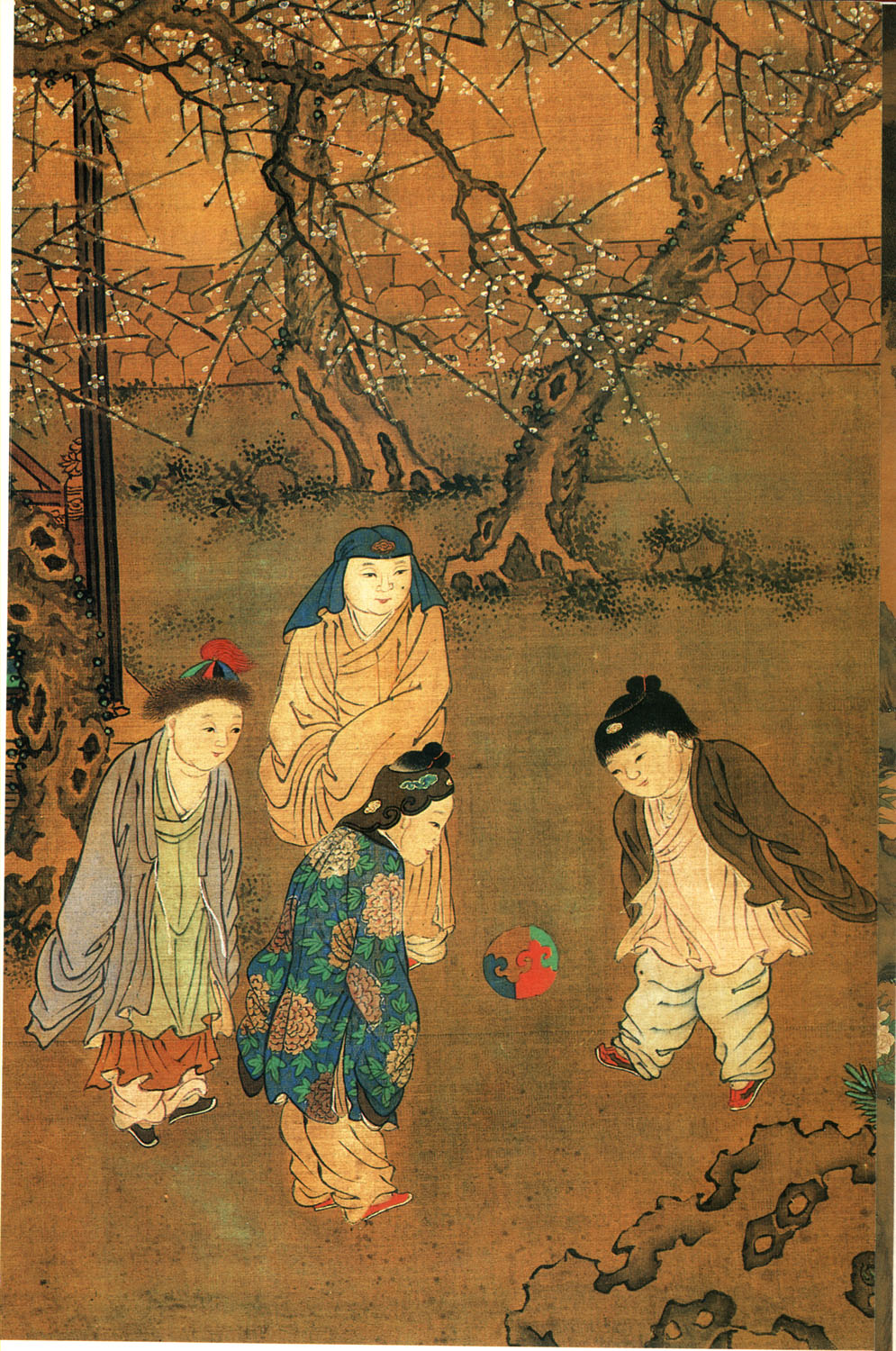
One Hundred Children in the Long Spring (長春百子圖), a painting by Chinese artist Su Hanchen (蘇漢臣, active AD 1130–1160s), Song dynasty

The first mention of cuju in a historical text is in the Warring States era Zhan Guo Ce, in the section describing the state of Qi. It is also described in Sima Qian's Records of the Grand Historian (under the Biography of Su Qin), written during the Han dynasty. A competitive form of cuju was used as fitness training for military cavaliers, while other forms were played for entertainment in wealthy cities like Linzi.

During the Han dynasty (206 BC – AD 220), the popularity of cuju spread beyond the military to the royal courts and upper classes. It is said that the Han emperor Wu Di enjoyed the sport. At the same time, cuju games were standardized and rules were established. Cuju matches were often held inside the imperial palace. A type of court called ju chang (鞠場) was built especially for cuju matches, which had six crescent-shaped goal posts at each end.

The sport was improved during the Tang dynasty (618–907). First of all, the feather-stuffed ball was replaced by an air-filled ball with a two-layered hull. Also, two different types of goal posts emerged: One was made by setting up posts with a net between them and the other consisted of just one goal post in the middle of the field. The Tang dynasty capital of Chang'an was filled with cuju fields, in the backyards of large mansions, and some were even established in the grounds of the palaces. Soldiers who belonged to the imperial army and Gold Bird Guard often formed cuju teams for the delight of the emperor and his court. The level of female cuju teams also improved. Cuju even became popular amongst the scholars and intellectuals, and if a courtier lacked skill in the game, he could pardon himself by acting as a scorekeeper.

Cuju flourished during the Song dynasty (960–1279) due to social and economic development, extending its popularity to every class in society. At that time, professional cuju players were popular, and the sport began to take on a commercial edge. Professional cuju players fell into two groups: One was trained by and performed for the royal court (unearthed copper mirrors and brush pots from the Song often depict professional performances) and the other consisted of civilians who made a living as cuju players. During this period only one goal post was set up in the center of the field.

It influenced the development in Japan of kemari (蹴鞠), which is still played today on special occasions. The kanji writing (蹴鞠) is the same as for cuju. The Silk Road facilitated the transmission of cuju, especially the game popular in the Tang dynasty, the period when the inflatable ball was invented and replaced the stuffed ball. Cuju began to decline during the Ming dynasty (1368–1644) due to neglect, and the 2,000-year-old sport slowly faded away.

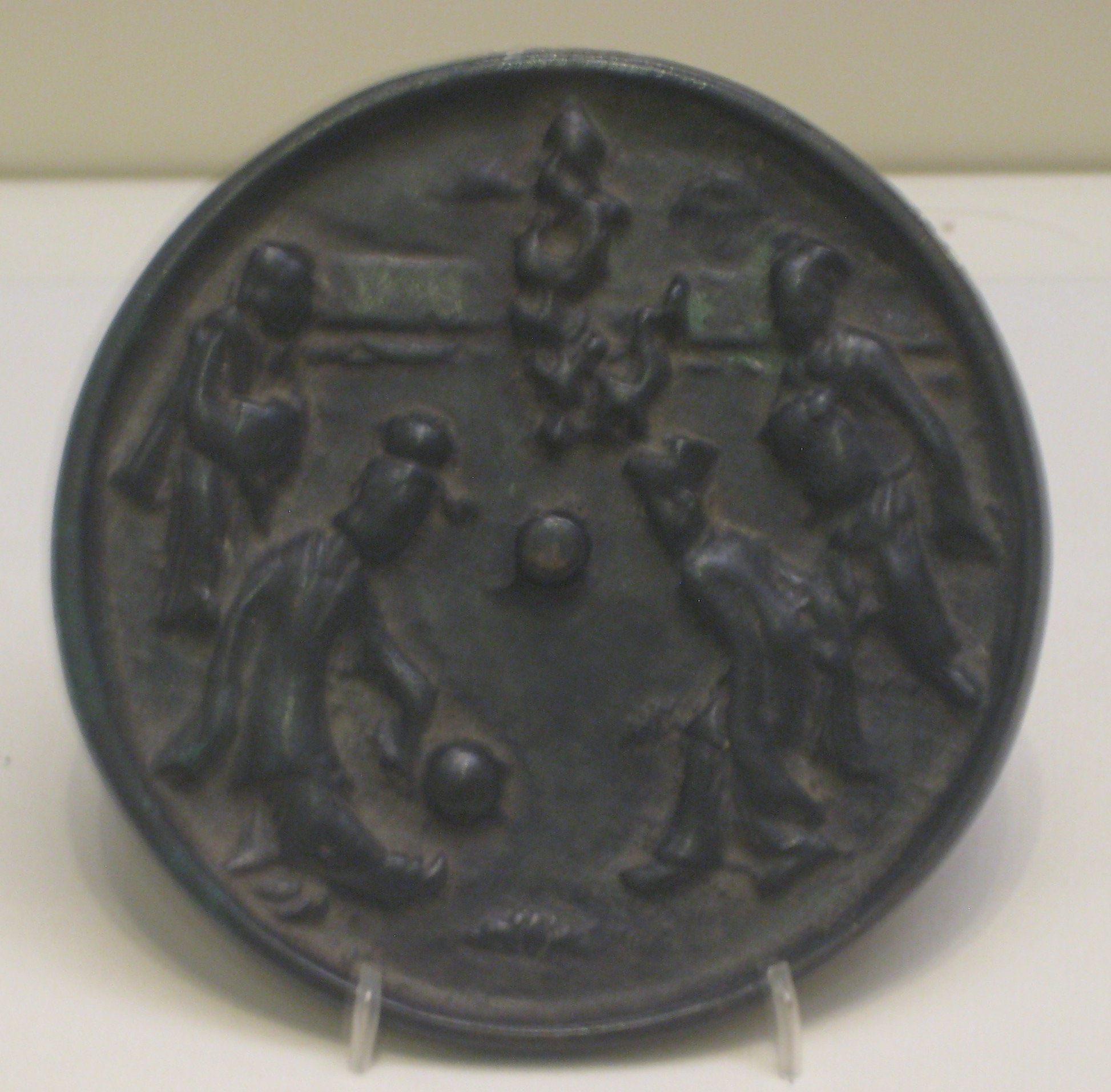
Bronze mirror dating to the Song dynasty

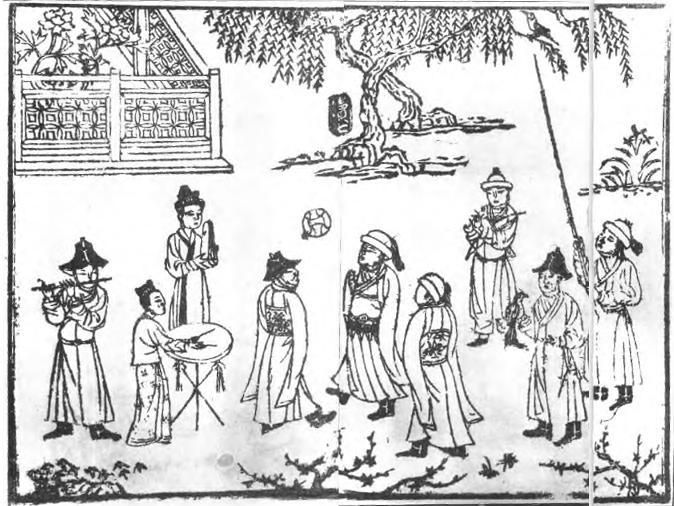
Yuan dynasty illustration in Shilin Guangji by Chen Yuanjing

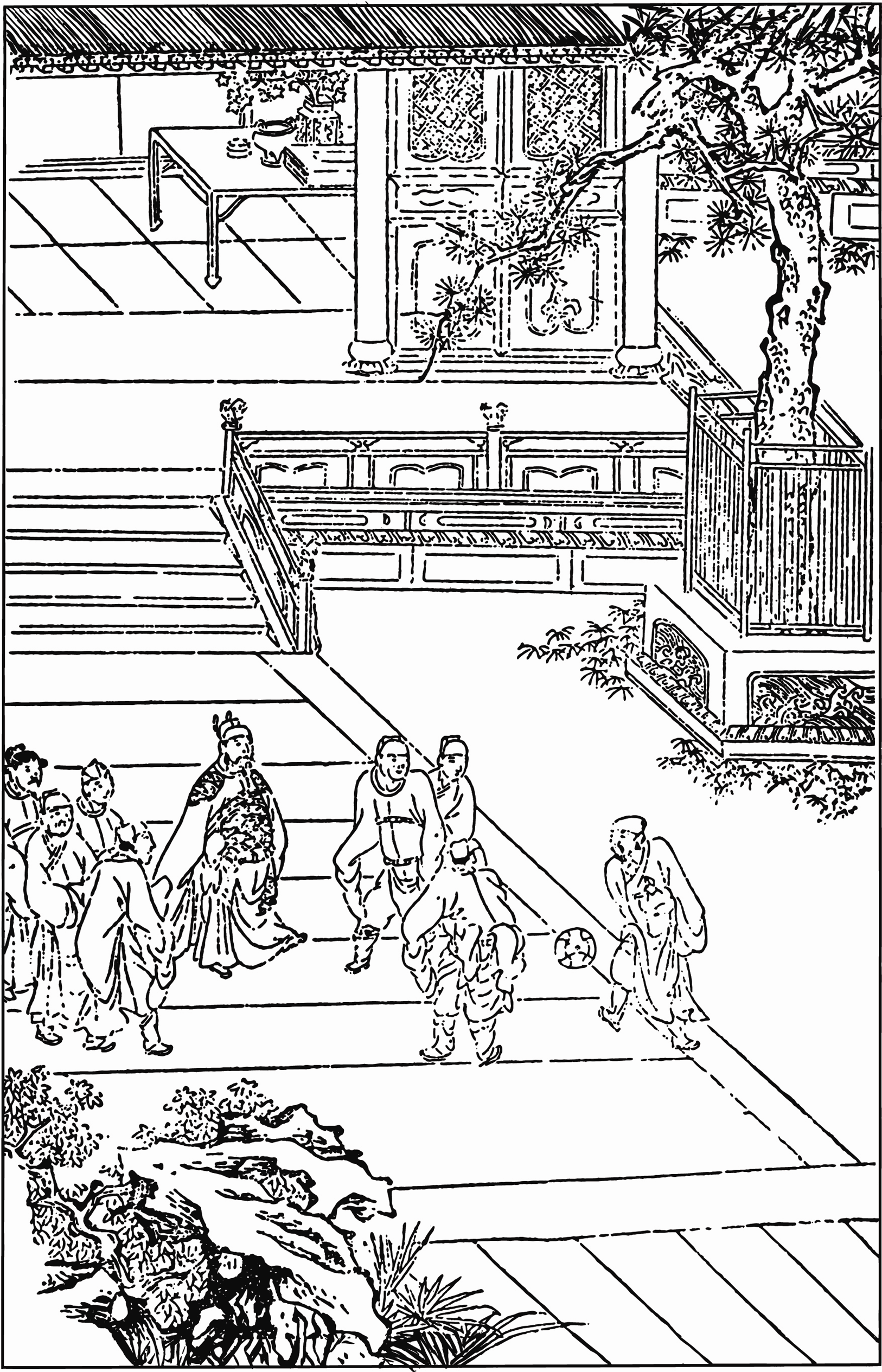
15th century Ming dynasty depiction of cuju, from a printed book of the Water Margin

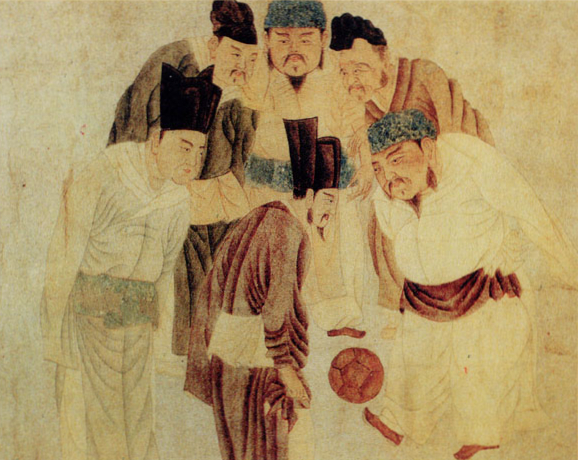
Emperor Taizu of Song playing cuju with Prime Minister Zhao Pu, by the Yuan-era painter Qian Xuan (1235–1305)

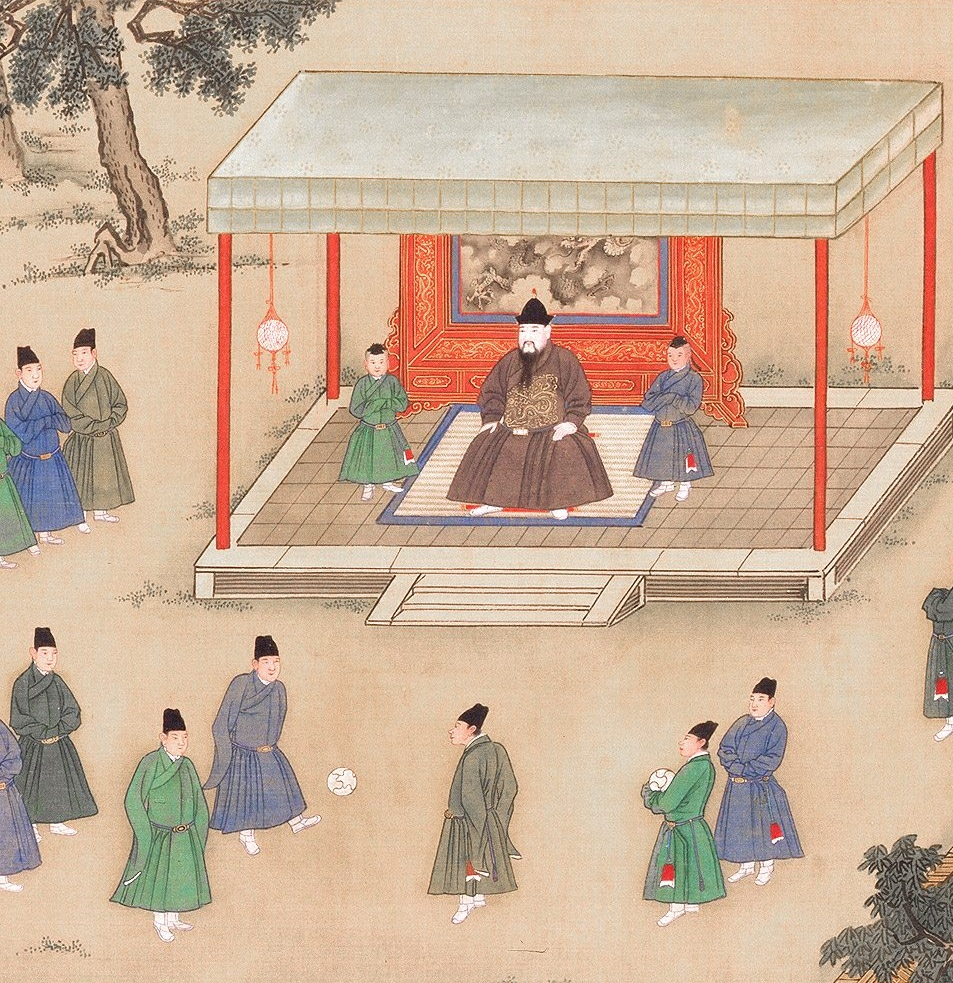
The Xuande Emperor (r. AD 1425–1435) of the Ming dynasty observing court eunuchs playing cuju

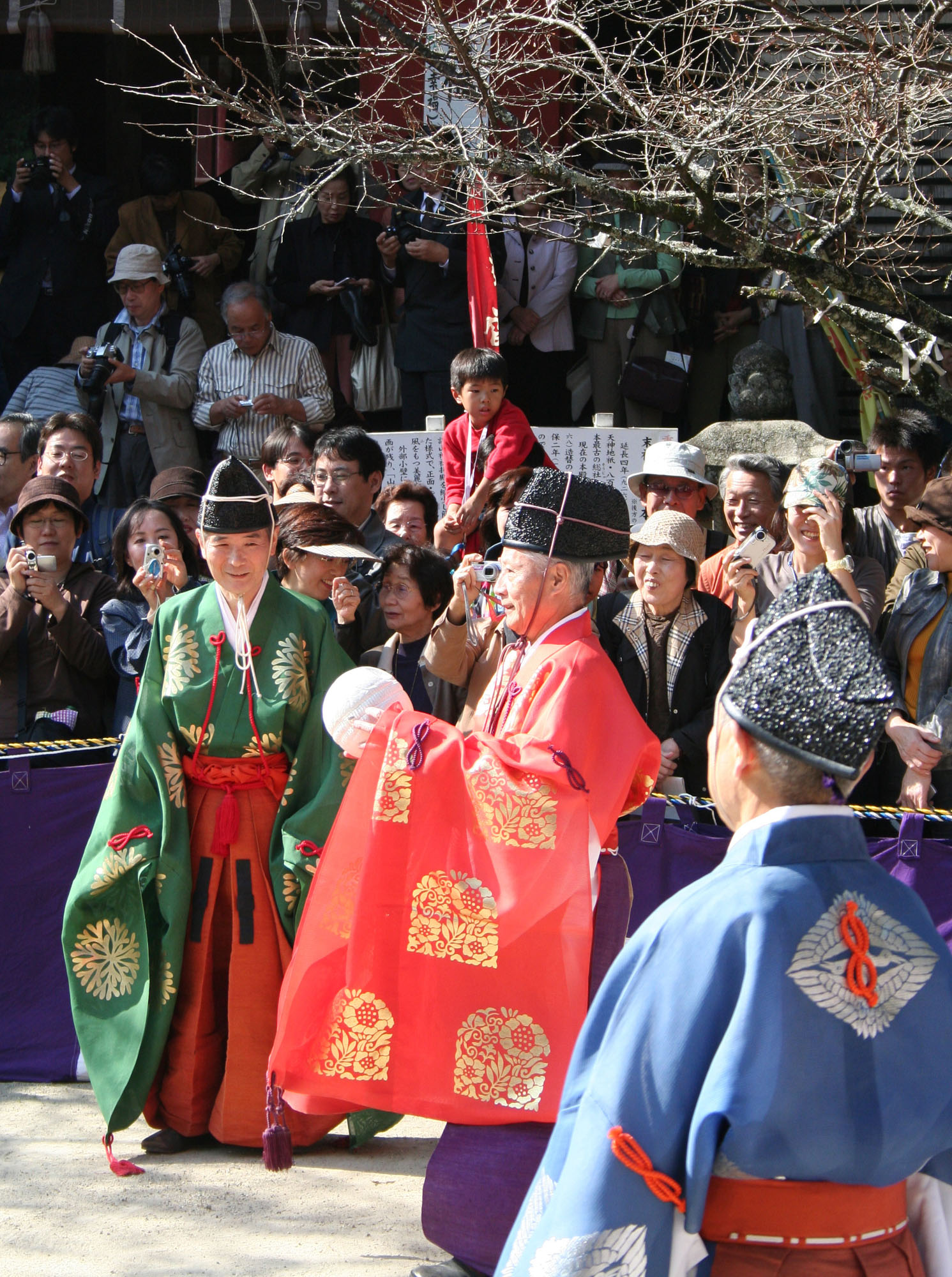
Kemari festival at Tanzan Shrine, Nara city, Nara Prefecture, Japan, photographed in 2006

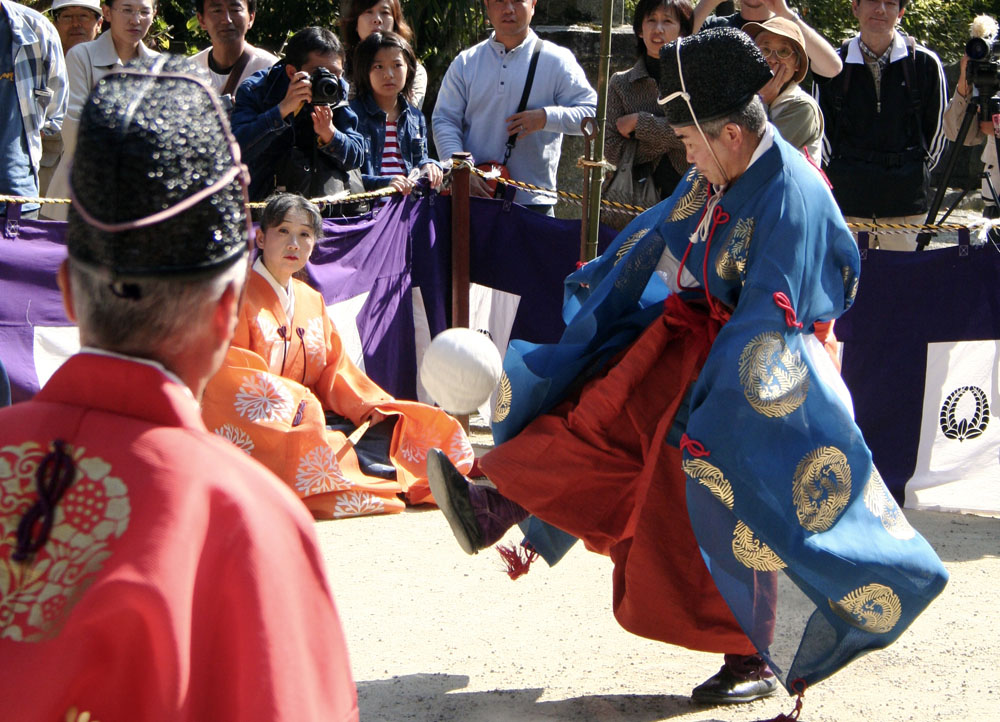
Kemari at play

== Gameplay ==
Historically, there were two main styles of cuju: zhuqiu (筑球) and baida (白打).

Zhuqiu was commonly performed at court feasts celebrating the emperor's birthday or during diplomatic events. A competitive cuju match of this type normally consisted of two teams with 12–16 players on each side.

Baida became dominant during the Song dynasty, a style that attached much importance to developing personal skills. Scoring goals became obsolete when using this method with the playing field enclosed using thread and players taking turns to kick the ball within these set limits. The number of fouls made by the players decided the winner. For example, if the ball was not passed far enough to reach other team members, points were deducted. If the ball was kicked too far out, a large deduction from the score would result. Kicking the ball too low or turning at the wrong moment all led to fewer points. Players could touch the ball with any part of the body except their hands, whilst the number of players ranged anywhere from two to ten. In the end, the player with the highest score won.

== Cuju clubs ==
According to Dongjing Meng Hua Lu, in the 10th century, a cuju league, Qi Yun She was developed in large Chinese cities. Local members were either cuju lovers or professional performers. Non-professionals had to formally appoint a professional as their teacher and pay a fee before becoming members. This process ensured an income for the professionals, unlike cuju of the Tang dynasty. Qi Yun She organised annual national championships known as Shan Yue Zheng Sai.

== In popular culture ==
- The Hong Kong TVB television series A Change of Destiny features at least one episode based on the cuju competition. Bagua concepts were also used to jinx the opposing team. However, it followed more of the modern football rules than the ancient rules of the game.
- John Woo's epic film Red Cliff features a cuju competition with Cao Cao and others observing from the sideline.
- The television series The Long Ballad features a cuju competition between the Tang dynasty and the Eastern Turkic Khaganate.
- The Korean television series Moon Embracing the Sun features a chugguk competition.
- The Korean television series Dream of the Emperor features a chugguk competition between the hwarang and royal inspectors while Princess Deokman is watching; in another scene Kim Chun-chu plays the game with his grandson.

== Cuju revival ==
In 2010, the city of Linzi organized a game of cuju for foreigners and locals in period costumes. Brazilian football player, Kaká played cuju during his tour while visiting China.

== Related games, derivatives and variants ==
- Chinlone – Burma. Non-competitive game that uses a rattan ball and is played among people standing in a circle, not on a court.
- Indiaca or featherball – Variant of the Brazilian game peteca popular in Europe. Played with the same shuttlecock as jianzi, but on a court similar to a badminton court, and played over the net using the hands.
- Jegichagi – Traditional Korean game. The shuttlecock, made with paper wrapped around a few coins, is called a "jegi," and "chagi" means "kicking."
- Jianzi – players aim to keep a heavily weighted shuttlecock in the air using their bodies apart from the hands
- Kemari – Japan (Heian Period). Meaning to "strike the ball with the foot."
- Pili or plumfoot – French variant of jiànzi.
- Sepak takraw – Malaysia, Thailand. Played using a light rattan ball about five inches in diameter. (Sepak means "kick" in Malay, and takraw means "ball" in Thai.)
- Sipa – Traditional native sport of the Philippines, meaning "kick."

== See also ==
- Episkyros
- Harpastum
- Knattleikr
- La soule
- List of Chinese inventions
- List of China-related topics
