= National sport =

Sport or other physical activity with particular significance in a nation

A national sport is a physical activity or sport that is culturally significant or deeply embedded in a nation, serving as a national symbol and an intrinsic element to a nation's identity and culture.

Several sovereign states and constituent states have formally recognized a specific activity as their national sport, typically favouring sports with origins stemming from their own countries. Conversely, in many other nations, the designation of a national sport is an informal acknowledgment bestowed upon an activity that is either widely embraced or holds historical and cultural significance to that nation.

== Official national sports ==
An official national sport is an activity that has been formally recognized and designated as a national sport of a particular nation by government authorities. This recognition often comes through legislation or decrees.

The following is a list of official national sports:

| Country/territory | Sport | Year of official recognition | Basis | Ref |
|---|---|---|---|---|
| Argentina | Pato | 1953 | Argentina Decree Nº 17468 | |
| Canada | Ice hockey (winter); Lacrosse (summer) | 1994 | National Sports of Canada Act | |
| Chile | Chilean Rodeo | 1962 | Official letter No. 269 of the Consejo Nacional de Deportes and Chilean Olympic Committee | |
| Colombia | Tejo | 2000 | Colombia Law 613 | |
| Mexico | Charrería | 1933 | Presidential decree by Abelardo L. Rodríguez | |
| Nepal | Volleyball | 2017 | Cabinet of Nepal decision | |
| Philippines | Arnis | 2009 | Republic Act No. 9850 | |
| Puerto Rico | Paso Fino | 1966 | Puerto Rico Act 64 of 2000 | |
| South Korea | Taekwondo | 2018 | National Sport Designation Act for Taekwondo | |
| Sri Lanka | Volleyball | 1991 | Declared by committee of the Ministry of Sports | |
| Uruguay | Destrezas Criollas | 2006 | National Law Nº 17958 | |

== Unofficial national sports ==
An unofficial national sport is an activity that holds significant popularity or cultural and historical significance within a particular nation but lacks legal recognition as the official national sport. These informal national sports typically reflect a nation's preferences and their perceived connection to the nation's culture and identity. The designation of an unofficial national sport can be contentious, as it can vary within a nation based on regional preferences and traditions.

The following is a list of unofficial national sports:

| Country or territory | | Sport |
|---|---|---|
| Afghanistan | | Buzkashi |
| Anguilla | | Boat racing |
| Antigua and Barbuda | | Cricket |
| Austria | | Alpine skiing |
| Bangladesh | | Kabaddi |
| Barbados | | Cricket |
| Bermuda | | Cricket |
| Bhutan | | Archery |
| Brazil | | Capoeira, association football |
| Cambodia | | Bokator |
| China | | Table tennis |
| Cook Islands | | Rugby league |
| Cuba | | Baseball |
| Czech Republic | | Ice hockey |
| Denmark | | Association football, handball |
| Dominican Republic | | Baseball |
| Estonia | | Basketball, Rallying |
| Falkland Islands | | Rifle shooting |
| Fiji | | Rugby union |
| Finland | | Pesäpallo |
| Georgia | | Rugby union |
| Grenada | | Cricket |
| Guyana | | Cricket |
| Haiti | | Association football |
| Iceland | | Glíma, handball |
| India | | Cricket, field hockey, kabaddi |
| Indonesia | | Badminton, pencak silat |
| Iran | | Freestyle wrestling |
| Ireland | | Gaelic games: hurling/camogie; Gaelic football/ladies' Gaelic football; Gaelic handball and rounders |
| Isle of Man | | Cammag |
| Italy | | Association football, Bocce |
| Jamaica | | Cricket |
| Japan | | Sumo, baseball |
| Latvia | | Ice hockey |
| Lithuania | | Basketball |
| Madagascar | | Rugby union |
| Malaysia | | Sepak takraw |
| Mauritius | | Association football |
| Mongolia | | Archery, horse racing, Mongolian wrestling |
| Montenegro | | Water polo |
| Myanmar | | Chinlone |
| Nauru | | Australian rules football |
| Nepal | | Dandibiyo |
| New Zealand | | Rugby union |
| Norway | | Cross-country skiing |
| Pakistan | | Field hockey |
| Panama | | Baseball |
| Papua New Guinea | | Rugby league |
| Peru | | Paleta frontón |
| Philippines | | Basketball, sipa |
| Poland | | Motorcycle speedway, volleyball |
| Romania | | Oină |
| Russia | | Bandy |
| Saudi Arabia | | Camel racing, horse racing, falconry |
| Serbia | | Basketball |
| Slovenia | | Alpine skiing |
| Spain | Entire | Association football |
| Spain | Basque Country | Basque pelota |
| Spain | Catalonia | Roller hockey |
| Spain | Valencia | Valencian pilota |
| Sweden | | Association football, cross-country skiing, ice hockey |
| Taiwan | | Baseball |
| Tajikistan | | Gushtigiri |
| Thailand | | Muay Thai |
| Turkey | | Cirit/jereed, oil wrestling |
| Turks and Caicos Islands | | Cricket |
| United Kingdom | Entire | Association football, cricket |
| United Kingdom | England | Association football, cricket |
| United Kingdom | Northern Ireland | No consensus: association football, hurling, Gaelic football are all given |
| United Kingdom | Scotland | Golf, shinty |
| United Kingdom | Wales | Rugby union, association football |
| United States of America | | Baseball, American football, Basketball |

== See also ==
- List of sports
- List of martial arts by regional origin
