= Jianzi =

Traditional Chinese national sport

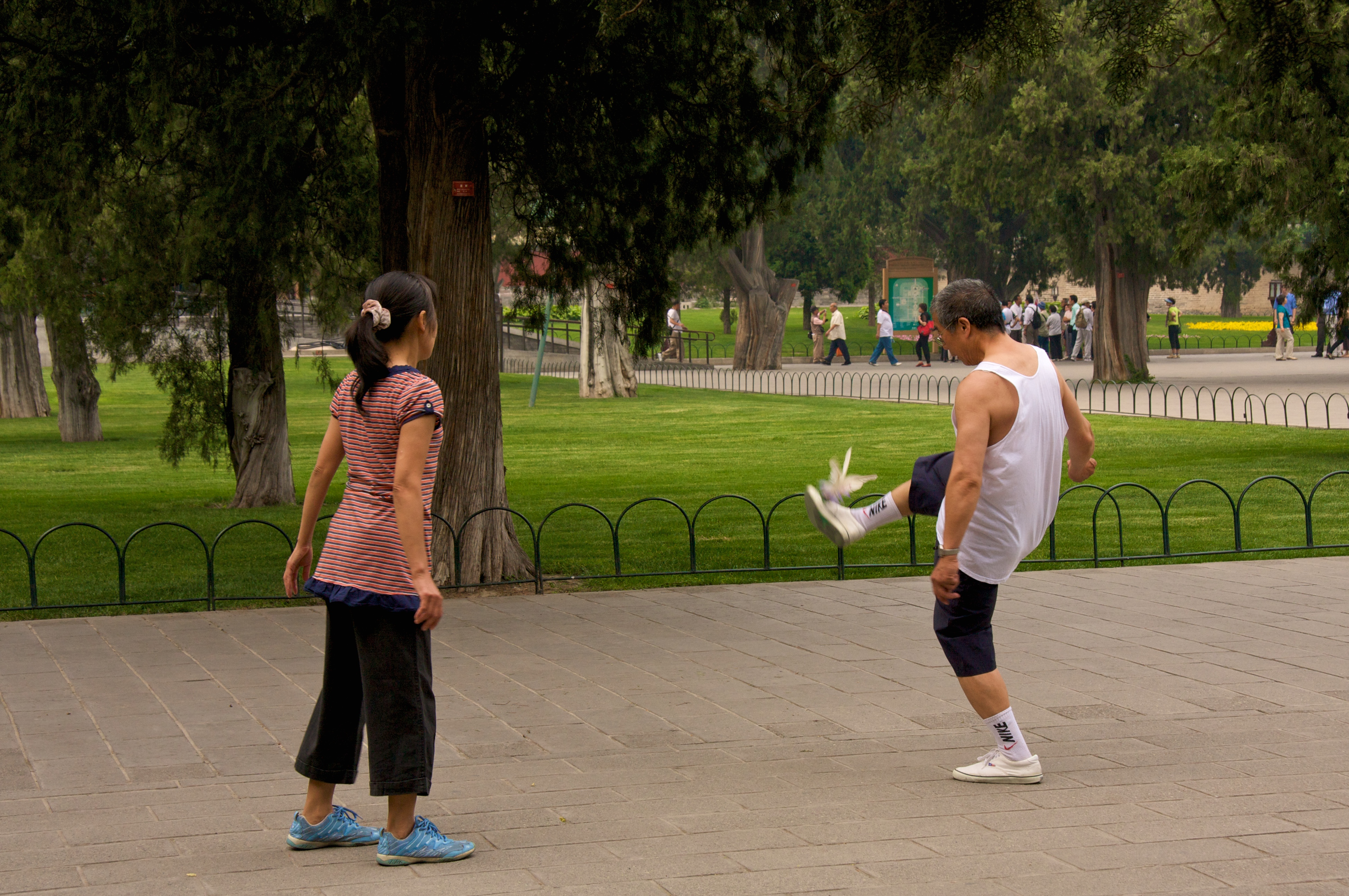
Two people playing jianzi

A traditional jianzi

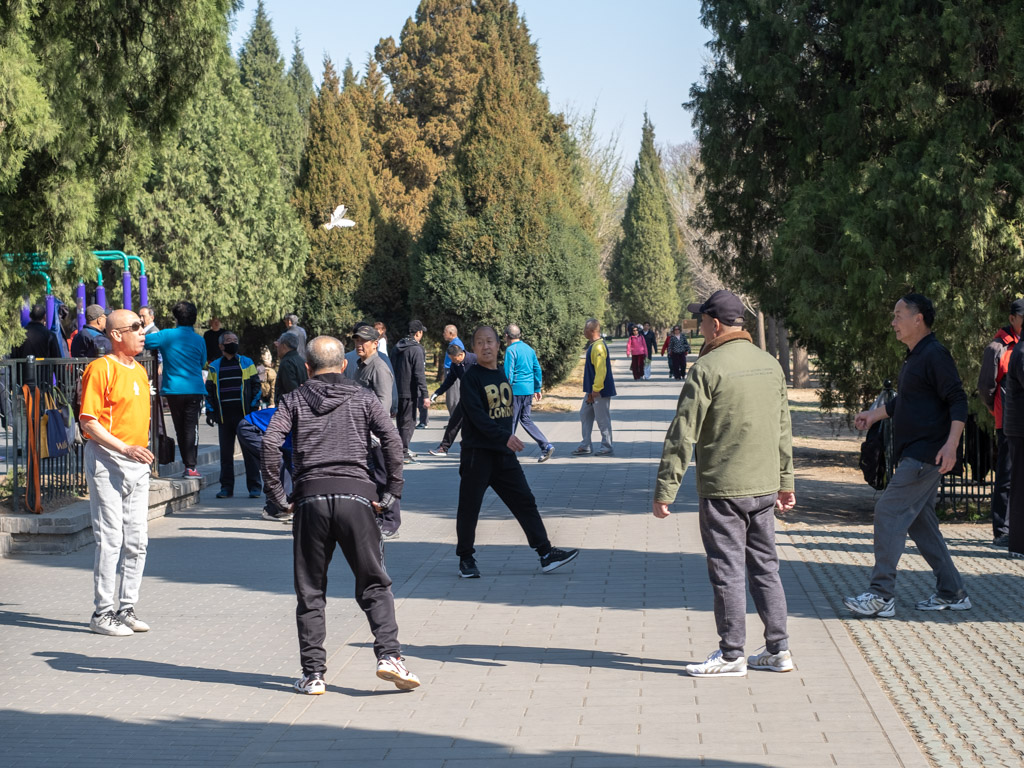
A group playing jianzi in Beijing's Temple of Heaven park

Jianzi (Chinese: 毽子; pinyin: jiànzi) (Note: Also known as 踢毽子; tī jiànzi, 踢毽; tī jiàn, and 毽球; jiànqiú) is a traditional Chinese sport in which players aim to keep a heavily weighted shuttlecock in the air using their bodies apart from the hands, unlike in similar games such as peteca and indiaca. The primary origin of jianzi is an ancient Chinese game called cuju, from the Han dynasty (202 BC – 9 AD, 25–220 AD). Jianzi is played on a badminton court using inner or outer lines in different competition settings. It can also be played artistically, among a circle of players in a street or park, with the objective to keep the shuttle 'up' and show off skills. In Vietnam, it is known as đá cầu, and it is the national sport. In the Philippines, it is known as sipa and was also the national sport, until it was replaced by arnis in December 2009.

The game has also gained a following around the globe. In English, both the sport and the object with which it is played are referred to as a "shuttlecock" or "featherball". In Malaysia, the game is known as capteh, or chapteh. It is considered a game played by children until they can master sepak raga.

== Gameplay ==
The shuttlecock (called a jianzi in the Chinese game, or 'Chinese hacky sack' and 'kinja' in English) typically has four feathers fixed into a rubber sole or a plastic disc. Some handmade jianzis make use of a washer or a coin with a hole in the centre.

During play, any part of the body except for the hands can be used to keep the shuttlecock from touching the ground. It is primarily balanced and propelled upwards using parts of the leg, especially the feet. Skilled players may employ an overhead kick. In China, the sport usually has two playing forms:

- Circle kick among 5–10 people
- Duel kick between two kickers or two sides.

The circle kick uses upward kicks only when keeping the shuttlecock from touching the ground. The duel kick has become popular among younger Chinese players, and uses "flat kick" techniques like goal shooting techniques in football. The "powerful flat kick" techniques are applied in Chinese games as a major attacking kill.

=== Competitive play ===
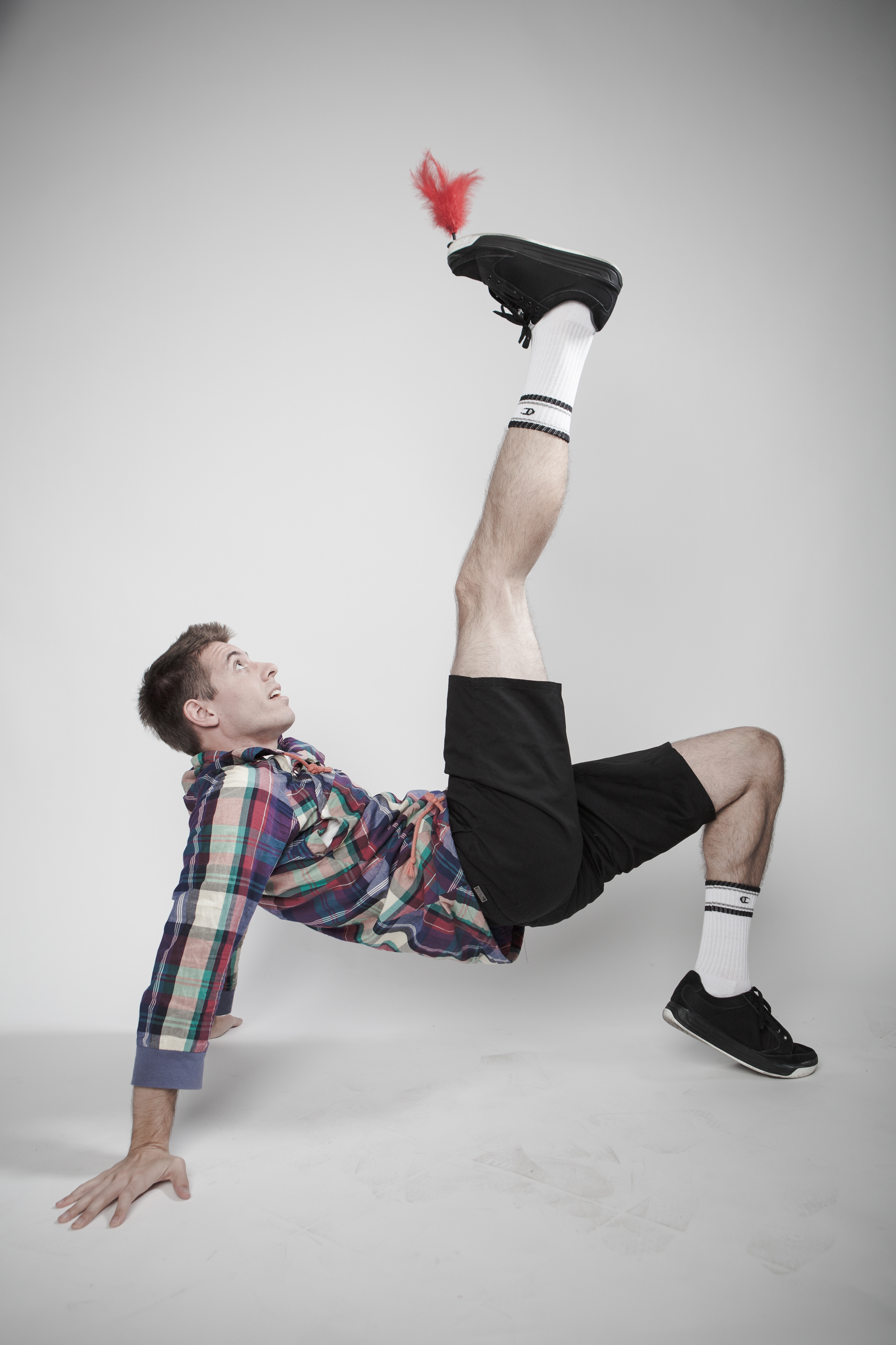
Freestyle Shuttlecock – Jan Weber – World Footbag Champion 2011–2013

Competitively, the government-run game is called "Hacky-Sack (jianqiu 毽球)" and is played on a rectangular court 6.10 by 11.88 meters, divided by a net (much like badminton) at a height of 1.60 meters (1.50 meters for women). A new style of Ti Jian Zi called "Chinese JJJ" was introduced in 2009. "JJJ" stands for "Competitive Jianzi-kicking" in Chinese with the three Chinese characters "竞技毽" all starting with "J". This version uses a lower middle net at 90 cm, and the inner or outside lines of the standard badminton court.

=== Non-competitive play ===
There are several variations of the game, such as trying to keep the shuttlecock in the air until an agreed number of kicks (e.g. 100) is reached, either alone or in a pair. In circle play, the aim may be simply to keep play going. In all but the most competitive formats, a skillful display is a key component of play. There are 2 informal games in Chinese JJJ games using the same middle net: "Team game" having 3 players on each side and "Half court game" using just a half court for double player game only.

=== Freestyle ===
Freestyle is very similar to freestyle footbag, where players perform various kicks, delays, and other maneuvers without touching the shuttlecock with their hands. Many footbag tricks were initially inspired by jianzi, but now jianzi freestylers often look for inspiration from footbag.

== History ==
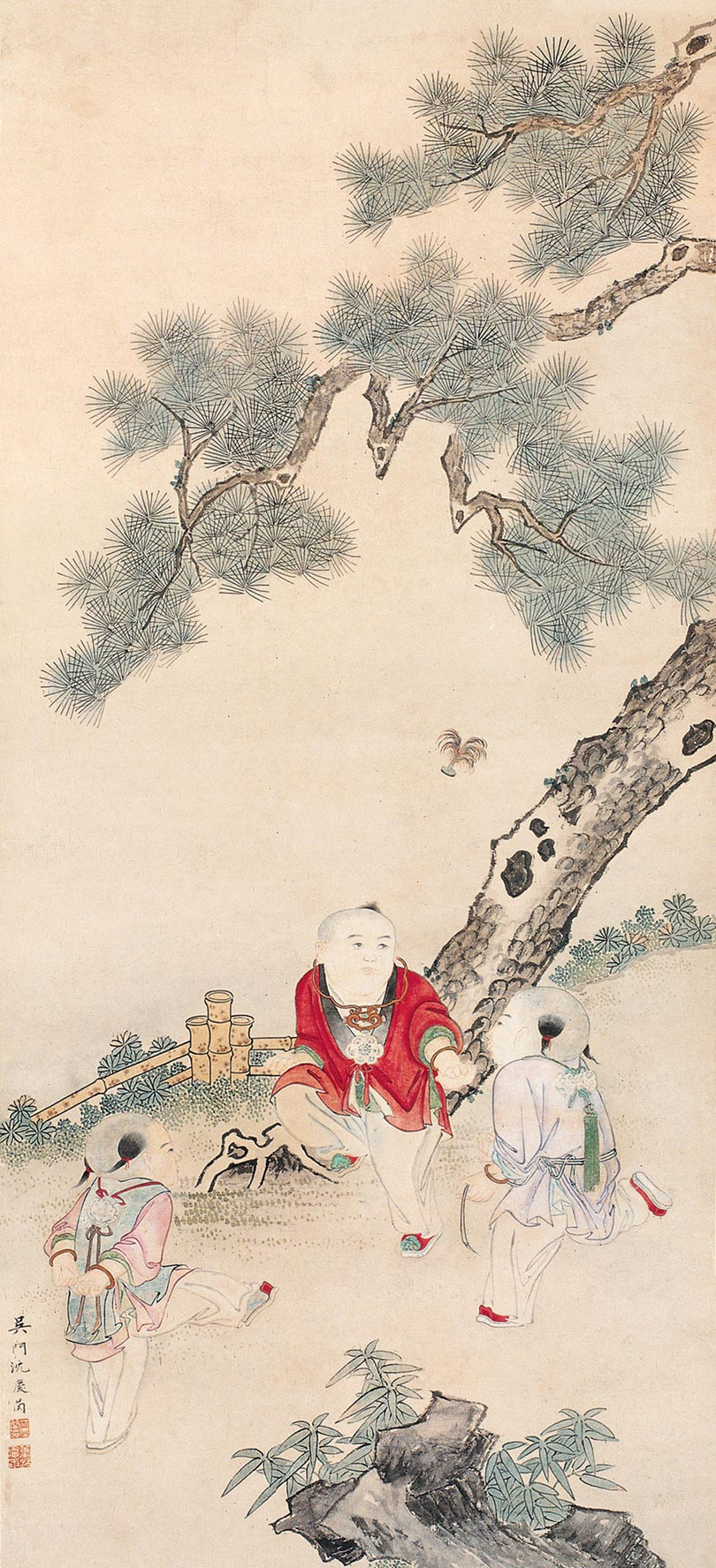
Painting by Shen Qinglan (18th–19th century) of children playing jianzi

Jianzi has been played since the Han dynasty (206 BC–220 AD), and was popular during the Six Dynasties period and the Sui and Tang dynasties. The game is believed to have evolved from cuju, a game similar to football that was used as military training. Several ancient books have record of it being played. Over time, the game spread throughout Asia, acquiring a variety of names along the way.

Jianzi came to Europe in 1936 when a Chinese athlete from the province of Jiangsu performed a demonstration at the 1936 Summer Olympics in Berlin. In Germany and other countries, people began to learn and play the sport, now called "shuttlecock".

The International Shuttlecock Federation (ISF) was founded in 1999 and the first world championship was organized by Hungary in Újszász in 2000. Up until this point, various countries took turns organizing championships. The sport continues to receive recognition, and was included as a sport in the 2003 Southeast Asian Games and in the Chinese National Peasants' Games. Among the members of ISF are China, Taiwan, Finland, Germany, the Netherlands, Hungary, Laos, Vietnam, Greece, France, Romania, and Serbia. Vietnam is highly regarded, having won the world championship for ten consecutive years. On 11 August 2003, delegates from Finland, France, Germany, Greece, Hungary, Romania, and Serbia founded the Shuttlecock Federation of Europe (S.F.E.) in Újszász, Hungary.

After being invented in 2009, Chinese JJJ spread throughout China due to it using similar techniques to football. In June 2010, the First Beijing Invitational Tournament for JJJ was held, with players from more than 10 countries participating. In 2011, the first formal Chinese JJJ Championship was held in Shandong province, with other provinces planned to follow.

In June 1961, a film about the sport called The Flying Feather was made by the Chinese central news agency, winning a gold medal at an international film festival.

In August 2011, an American company released a toy called Kikbo based on jianzi.

In 2013, a Hong Kong company released KickShuttle. It is a form of shuttlecock not made using feathers.

Shuttlecock sport Jianzi

== Official jianzi for competitions ==
The official shuttlecock consists of four equal-length goose or duck feathers joined at a rubber or plastic base. It weighs approximately 15–25 grams (0.53–0.88 oz) and is 15–21 centimetres (5.9–8.3 in) long. The feathers vary in color, usually dyed red, yellow, blue, or green. In competitions a pink shuttlecock is preferred.

The shuttlecock used in Chinese JJJ games weighs 24–25 grams (0.85–0.88 oz). The height from the bottom of rubber base to top of the shuttlecock is 14–15 centimetres (5.5–5.9 in) and the width between tops of two opposite feathers is also 14–15 centimetres (5.5–5.9 in).

== Related games, derivatives and variants ==
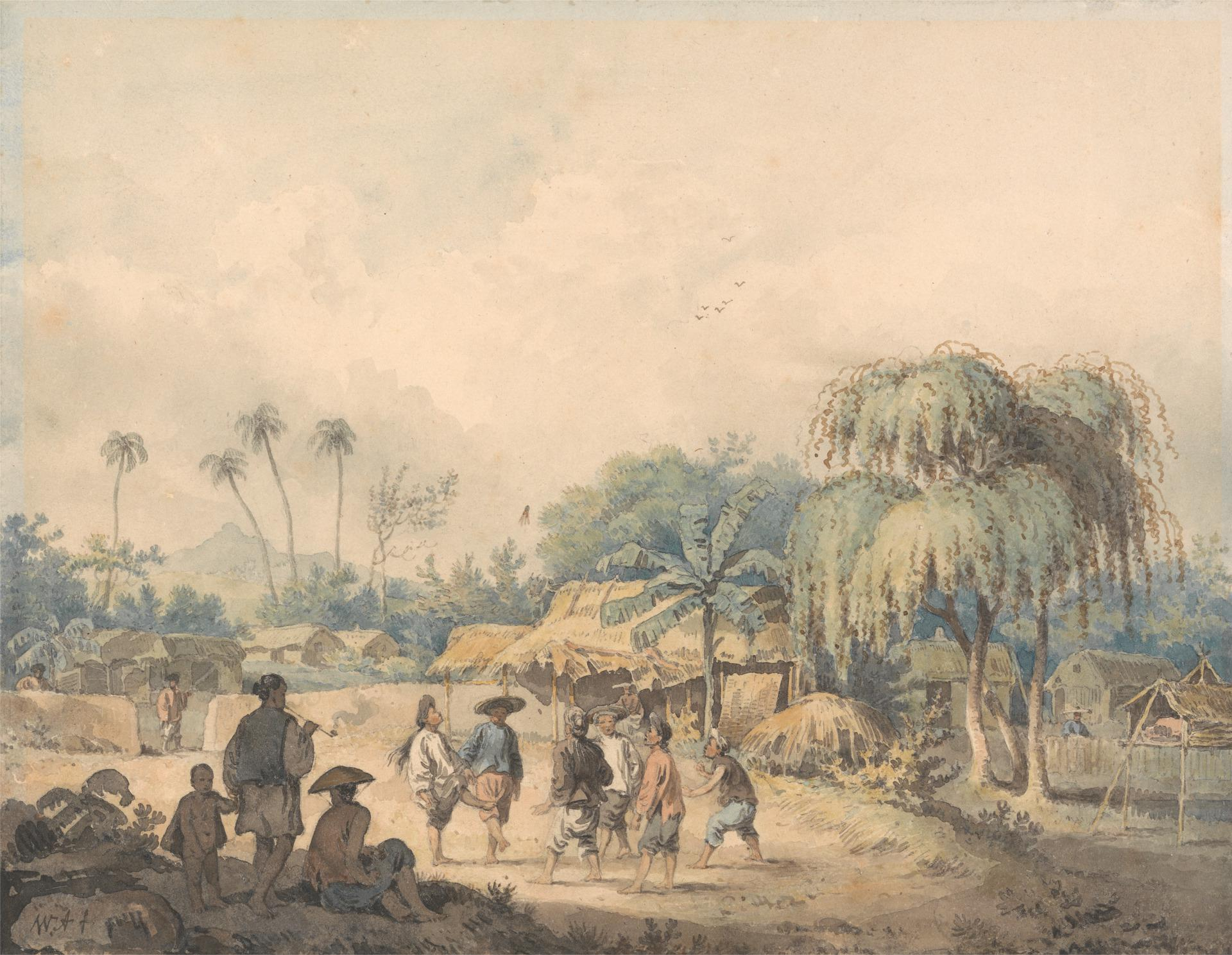
Vietnamese đá cầu players. Natives of Cochinchina, playing at Shuttlecock with their Feet, watercolour painting on wove paper by William Alexander, circa 1792.

- Đá cầu – Vietnam's unofficial national sport.
- Jegichagi – Traditional Korean game. The shuttlecock, made with paper wrapped around a few coins, is called a "jegi," and "chagi" means "kicking".
- Kemari – Japan (Heian Period). Meaning to "strike the ball with the foot".
- Sepak takraw – Thailand. Played using a light rattan ball about five inches in diameter. (Sepak means "kick" in Malay, and takraw means "ball" in Thai.)
- Chinlone – Burma. Non-competitive game that uses a rattan ball and is played among people standing in a circle, not on a court.
- Sipa – Traditional native sport of the Philippines, meaning "kick".
- Pili or plumfoot – French variant of jiànzi.
- Peteca – Brazil. The shuttlecock should be tossed above a net and land at the rival’s side to earn a point. The game is basically like Volleyball, but with a shuttlecock instead of a ball, and also basically like badminton, but without rackets.
- Indiaca or featherball – Variant of the Brazilian game peteca popular in Europe. Played with the same shuttlecock as jianzi, but on a court similar to a badminton court, and played over the net using the hands.
- Myachi
- UKick
- Ebon (game)
- Kickit
- Lyanga

== See also ==
- Basse
- Beanbag
- Bossaball
- Footbag
- Footbag net
- Footvolley
- Hacky Sack
- Indiaca
- Peteca
