= Footbag net =

Type of sport

Footbag net is a sport in which players kick a footbag over a five-foot-high net. Players may use only the feet. Any contact knee or above is a foul. The game is played individually and as doubles.

Footbag net combines elements of tennis, badminton, and volleyball. Specifically, the court dimensions and layout are similar to those of doubles badminton; the scoring is sideout scoring (you must be serving to score); and serves must be diagonal, as in tennis. Footbag net games can be played to eleven or fifteen points, although the winners must win by at least two points.

Footbag net is governed by the International Footbag Players Association (IFPA). Competitions take place all over the world, but primarily in North America and Europe. The World Footbag Championships is an annual, week-long event held in a different city each year.

== See also ==
Similar games include:

- Footvolley
- Jianzi
- Bossaball
- Sepak Takraw
- Sipa
- Football tennis
