= Football tennis =

Czech sport played with a football

Football Tennis game, 2014

Football tennis, also known as futnet and soccer tennis (Czech and Slovak: nohejbal), is a sport played with a football. The sport is played indoors or outdoors on a court divided by a low net with two opposing teams made up of one, two or three players, who try to score a point by hitting the ball with any part of their body except for the hands and making it bounce in the opponent's area in a way that makes it difficult or impossible for the other team to return it over the net.

== History ==
In 1922, the members of the football club Slavia Prague started playing a game which they called 'football over the rope', because it was initially played over a horizontally suspended rope, which was later replaced by a net. Usually, two or three players on each side could touch the ball three times (though a single player could not touch the ball twice consecutively) with all parts of the body except for the arms. Players could let the ball bounce once between the touches up to three times before passing it to the other side.

In 1940, the first official rules were written. The first futnet cup was played in 1940, and between 1953 and 1961, the first league, called Trampská Liga, was played. In 1961 futnet was recognized as an official sport by Czechoslovak Sports Organisation (ČSTV), and the Prague Futnet Commission was established. In 1971, the "Český nohejbalový svaz" (Czech Futnet Association) was founded, followed in 1974 by the "Výbor nohejbalového zväzu SÚV ČSTV" (Slovak Futnet Association).

Official international competitions have been organized for decades. European championships have been held since 1991 and world championships since 1994.

== Rules ==
There are three futnet disciplines:

- Single: one player, two touches, one bounce in all categories, court dimensions 9 m × 12.8 m.
- Double: two players, three touches (but not two consecutive touches by the same player), one bounce allowed for men and two bounces for women and juniors, court dimensions 9 m × 12.8 m.
- Triple: three players, three touches (but not two consecutive touches by the same player), one bounce allowed for men and two for women and juniors, court dimensions 9 m × 18 m.

In all the disciplines, a set finishes once a side gains 11 points with a two-point difference between the sides; the maximum score is 15:14. To win a match, a team has to win 2 sets. The height of the net is 1.10 m. The players may not touch the net during the game; otherwise, it is a point for the opponent. The futnet ball is similar to a football in size, but is glued, made of 32 panels of synthetic (natural) leather, and when properly inflated should bounce more than half a meter.

If the ball hits the net and comes back to the side of the team that attempted to hit it over, it cannot be hit back, unlike in volleyball.

== International associations ==
In 1987, the International Footballtennis Association (IFTA, later renamed to FIFTA, the Federation International de Footballtennis Association) was founded. In 2010, Union Internationale de Futnet (UNIF) was founded by some former FIFTA members, later joined by other nations, to govern, regulate and promote the sport of futnet. In December 2012, UNIF had 17 member countries.

In April 2010 European Futnet Association (EFTA) was founded in Marseille, France, to reactivate the sport in Europe where it had been stagnating under FIFTA. Current EFTA members include Switzerland, France, Czech Republic, Slovakia, Romania, Ireland, Basque Country, Denmark, England, Poland, Ukraine and Austria. EFTA is the continental association of UNIF in Europe.

== International name ==
While the term football tennis is still commonly used, the word futnet is being used more as the new international name to reflect the independent nature of this sport which has around 100 years of history and which has its own rules and regulations, governing structures and regular competitions.

== World Championships ==
- 1st World Championship 1994, Košice, Slovakia

Single 1. Hungary 2. Slovakia 3. Romania
Double 1. Czech Republic 2. Slovakia 3. Romania
Triple 1. Slovakia 2. Czech Republic 3. Romania

- 2nd World Championship 1996, Maceio, Brazil

Single 1. Romania 2. Slovakia 3. Czech Republic
Double 1. Slovakia 2. Czech Republic 3. Romania
Triple 1. Czech Republic 2. Slovakia 3. Romania

- 3rd World Championship 1998, Szolnok, Hungary

Single 1. Slovakia 2. Czech Republic 3. Romania
Double 1. Czech Republic 2. Slovakia 3. Romania
Triple 1. Czech Republic 2. Slovakia 3. Romania

- 4th World Championship 2000, Prostějov, Czech Republic

Single 1. Czech Republic 2. Slovakia 3. Romania
Double 1. Slovakia 2. Czech Republic 3. Romania
Triple 1. Slovakia 2. Czech Republic 3. Romania

- 5th World Championship 2002, Szombathely, Hungary

Single 1. Czech Republic 2. Slovakia 3. Romania
Double 1. Czech Republic B 2. Slovakia 3. Romania
Triple 1. Slovakia 2. Czech Republic 3. Romania

- 6th World Championship 2004, Prostějov, Czech Republic

Single 1. Slovakia "A" 2. Czech Republic "A" 3. Slovakia "B"
Double 1. Czech Republic 2. Slovakia 3. Romania
Triple 1. Slovakia 2. Czech Republic 3. Romania

- 7th World Championship 2006, Oradea, Romania

Single 1. Romania 2. Czech Republic 3. Slovakia
Double 1. Slovakia 2. Czech Republic 3. Romania
Cross-Double 1. Czech Republic 2. Romania 3. Slovakia
Triple 1. Slovakia 2. Czech Republic 3. Romania

- 8th World Championship 2008, Nymburk, Czech Republic

Single 1. Romania 2. France 3. Czech Republic
Double 1. Czech Republic 2. Romania 3. Slovakia
Cross Double 1. Czech Republic 2. Slovakia 3. Romania
Triple 1. Slovakia 2. Czech Republic 3. Hungary

- 9th World Championship 2010, Istanbul, Turkey (some stronger countries such as Slovakia, Czech Republic, France and Switzerland did not participate)

Single 1. Romania 2. Hungary 3. Croatia
Double 1. Romania 2. Hungary 3. Croatia
Triple 1. Hungary 2. Romania 3. Croatia

- 10th World Championship 2012, Nymburk, Czech Republic

Single 1. Slovakia 2. Hungary 3. Czech Republic
Double 1. Slovakia 2. Czech Republic 3. Hungary
Triple 1. Slovakia 2. Czech Republic 3. Hungary

- 11th World Championship 2014, North Nicosia, Northern Cyprus

Single Man 1. Romania 2. France 3. Hungary
Single Woman 1. Romania 2. Northern Cyprus 3. Turkey

- 14th World Championship 2022, Prague, Czech Republic

Single 1. Hungary 2. Slovakia 3. Czech Republic
Double 1. France 2. Slovakia 3. Czech Republic
Triple 1. Slovakia 2. Czech Republic 3. France

== See also ==
- Sepak takraw
- Padbol
- Jokgu
- Jianzi
