= Hand sack =

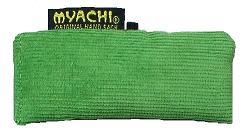
A hand sack by Myachi.

A hand sack is any sack or similar object, typically made of cloth and filled with sand or a similar material, that is tossed on the back of the hand for the purpose of mastering tricks or playing games.

== Origin ==
Tossing and catching (or striking) a sack with the back of one's hand has roots in Asian and Native American games. The Japanese game otidama has versions that involved picking up and catching small sand or bean filled sacks on the back of one's hand. Native Americans had a game where a shuttlecock, constructed from corn husk and feathers, was struck upward with the back of one's hand as a competition among players.

== Modern Hand Sack ==
The modern game of hand sack was first created by Tom Hanson from Farmington Michigan. The patented game is called Saceasi, pronounced: Sac-Ah-C. It is elliptical in shape, filled with same-shaped beads for minimal displacement. Hanson introduced the game, originally played with a lighter at Central Michigan University in 1989 and spread to the music festival scene and on to other campuses nationwide. In the late 1990's and early 2000, hand sacks were made popular by the brand Myachi with rectangular, sand-filled hand sacks being sold from an RV at music festivals, theme parks & amusement parks, and later in stores. In 2018, Flow Circus introduced the Flop Ball, a round micro suede sack in order to support the player, promote mindfulness & wellbeing, and to push the game forward. In addition to the round and rectangular designs, Flop Ball innovated other designs to create new opportunities for kinetic play, including Flower (with tassels), Loops, and Lines.

== Basic Manipulations ==
There is an emerging vocabulary for describing how the hand sack moves in the air and in the hands.

Flat

A toss and catch where the hand sack does not flip or rotate.

Back Flip

A toss and catch where the hand sack flips back toward the player.

Front Flip

A toss and catch where the hand sack flips forward away from the player.

In Flip

A toss and catch where the hand sack flips in the direction of the middle of the body or toward the other hand.

Out Flip

A toss and catch where the hand sack flips in a direction away from the middle of the body or away from the other hand.

== See also ==
- Beanbag
- Footbag
- Hacky Sack
- Peteca
