= Padbol =

Argentinian fusion sport

- Highest governing body: FIPA (International Federation of Padbol Associates)
- Nicknames: Padbol, Foot-Padel
- First played: 2008, La Plata

Characteristics
- Team members: Doubles
- Type: Outdoor/Indoor
- Venue: Padbol court

Padbol is a fusion sport created in La Plata, Argentina in 2008, combining elements of football, tennis, volleyball, and squash.

It is currently played in Argentina, Australia, Austria, Belgium, Denmark, France, Iran, Israel, Italy, Mexico, Panama, Portugal, Romania, Spain, Sweden, Switzerland, United States and Uruguay.

== History ==
Padbol was created in 2008 by Gustavo Miguens in La Plata, Argentina. The first courts were built in 2011 in Argentina, in cities including Rojas, Punta Alta, and Buenos Aires. Courts were then added in Spain, Uruguay and Italy, and more recently in Portugal, Sweden, Mexico, Romania, and the United States. Australia, Bolivia, Iran, and France are the newest countries to adopt the sport.

In 2013, the first Padbol World Cup was held in La Plata. The champions were the Spanish pair, Ocaña and Palacios. In 2014, the second World Cup was held in Alicante, Spain. The champions were the Spanish pair Ramón and Hernández. The third World Cup took place at Punta del Este, Uruguay, in 2016.

== Rules ==
=== Court ===
The playing area is a walled court, 10m long and 6m wide. It is divided by a net, with a height of at most 1m at each end and between 90 and 100 cm in the center. The walls should be at least 2.5m high and of equal height. There must be at least one entrance to the court, which may or may not have a door.

=== Areas ===
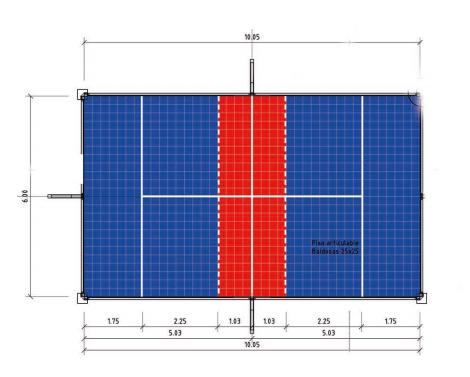
Areas on the court

There are three zones: a Service Zone, Reception zone and Red Zone.

- Service zone: The server must be within this zone while serving.
- Reception zone: The area between the net and the service zone. Balls that land on the lines between the zones are considered to be inside this zone.
- Red zone: The middle of the court, extending across its width, and 1m on each side of the net. It is colored red.

=== Ball ===
The ball has a uniform outer surface and is coloured white or yellow. Its perimeter is 670 mm, made of polyurethane and it can weigh from 380-400 grams.

== Summary ==
- Players: 4, played in a doubles format.
- Serves: Serves must be underhand. A second serve is allowed in the event a fault, as in tennis.
- Score: Scoring method is the same as in tennis. Matches are best of three sets.
- Ball: Like a football but smaller.
- Court: There are two styles of courts: indoor and outdoor.
- Walls: Walls or fences are part of the game and they are constructed so that the ball bounces off of them.

== FIPA (International Federation of Padbol Associates) ==
30 members in March 2025:

1. Latin America (8): ARG, BOL, BRA, ECU, MEX, PAR, PER, URU
2. Europe (14): AUT, CYP, FRA, GER, HUN, ITA, LIE, MDA, NED, POL, POR, ESP, ROU, UKR
3. Asia (6): ISR, BHR, KUW, QAT, IRI, UAE
4. Africa (2): EGY, RSA

== Tournaments ==
=== Padbol World Cup ===
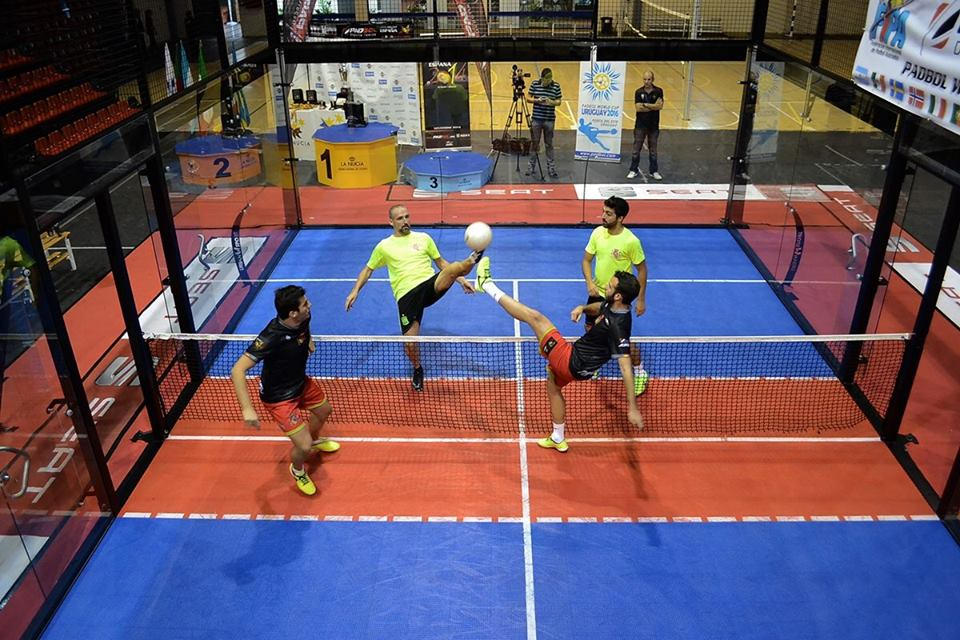
2014 World Cup Final

In March 2013 the first FIPA (International Federation of Padbol Associates) Padbol World Cup was held in La Plata, Argentina. Participants were sixteen couples from Argentina, Uruguay, Italy, and Spain. In the final, Ocaña/Palacios won 6-1/6-1 against Saiz/Rodriguez.

The second World Cup was held in November 2014 in Alicante, Spain. 15 pairs participated from seven countries (Argentina, Uruguay, Mexico, Spain, Italy, Portugal, and Sweden). Ramón/Hernández won the final 6-4/7-5 against Ocaña/Palacios.

The third edition was held in Punta del Este, Uruguay, in 2016.

In 2017, a European Cup was held in Constanța, Romania.

The 2019 World Cup also took place in Romania.

== World rankings ==
=== Current rankings ===
Best players in 2015
Position	Couples	Points
1	ARG Maidana/Narbaitz	1290
2	ESP Ocaña/Palacios	1130
3	ESP Almeida/Belza	1100
3	ESP Ramón/Hernández	1100
5	ARG Labayen	765
Full list at padbol.com

== See also ==
- Football tennis
- Padel
- Sepak takraw
