= Jegichagi =

Korean traditional outdoor game

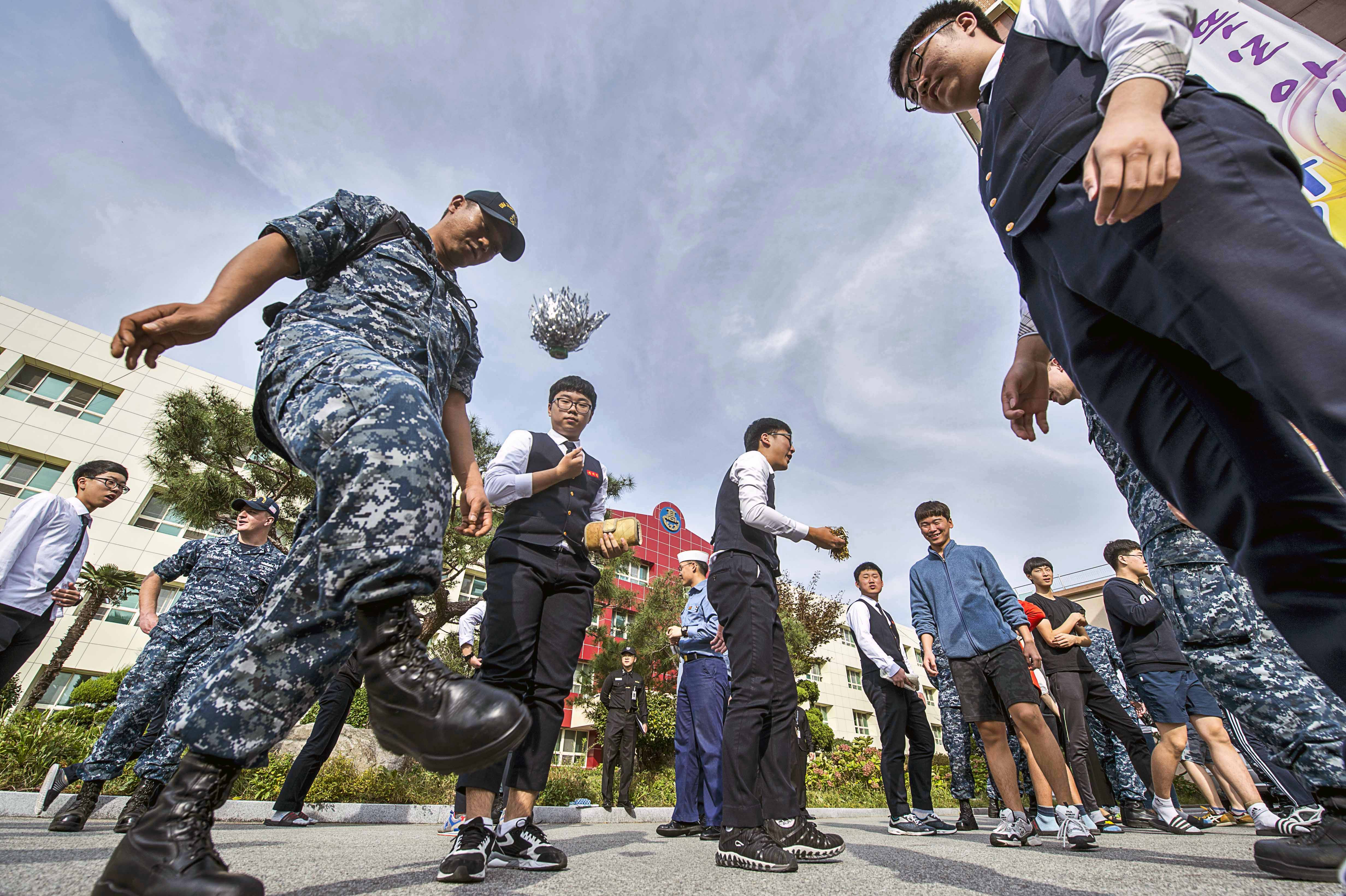
- U.S. Navy crew playing jegichagi with Korean students

Korean name
- Hangul: 제기차기
- RR: jegichagi
- MR: chegich'agi

Jegichagi (Korean: 제기차기) is a Korean traditional outdoor game in which players kick a paper jegi into the air and attempt to keep it aloft. A jegi is similar to a shuttlecock, and is made from paper wrapped around a small coin.

In North Korea and South Korea, children usually play alone or with friends in winter seasons, especially on Korean New Year. Briefly explaining the rules, the player kicks a jegi up in the air and keeps on kicking to prevent from falling to the ground. In a one-to-one game, a player with the most consecutive kicks wins. In a group game, the players stand in a circle, and take turns kicking the jegi. Players who fail to kick the jegi upon receiving it and let it drop to the ground lose. As a penalty, the loser tosses the jegi at the winner so that he can kick it as he wishes. When the loser catches the jegi back with his hands, the penalty ends and he can rejoin the game. This has developed, and people combined two or three materials and made new ways of playing jegichagi. Though the game was traditionally mostly played in winter, it has become a year-round game.

== History ==
Although there is no written record about the origin of jegichagi, historical legends states that the game was developed from young martial artists' training which involved kicking a small leather pouch. Jegichagi has been developed in a different way.

According to Samguk yusa, the ancient Korean record, the people of Goguryeo were skilled at playing Cuju, the Chinese game of kicking a ball. Jegichagi evolved with the influence from Cuju that was widely played in Korea at this time. Kim Yushin of Silla stepped on and tore off Kim Chunchu's otgoreum, two long ribbon ties in Korean traditional costume, under the mask of playing jegichagi and had his sister sew it back on. Through that event, Kim Yushin's sister eventually married and became wife of Kim Chunchu, later Muyeol of Silla.

In 2000, Korean Jegichagi Association was founded to make new rules in order to fit this traditional game well into today's generation. Although jegichagi is well known as many of other famous traditional games in Korea, the game is losing its popularity. In effort to keep traditional jegichagi alive within children's mind, the Board of Education in South Korea ordered jegichagi as one of the required activities in physical education courses in school, usually 3rd or 4th grade.

In August 2011, an American company released a children's toy called Kikbo based on jegichagi.

== Construction ==
Traditionally, a jegi is made by taking a coin with a hole through the middle, and a sheet of hanji paper. The paper is folded in half, the coin is placed in the middle of the folded paper, and the paper is folded several times again with the coin still inside the paper. A sharp object is then used to pierce a hole through the paper, also passing through the hole in the coin. Each end of the folded paper is then inserted into the hole, and the ends of the paper are unfolded and torn into strands.

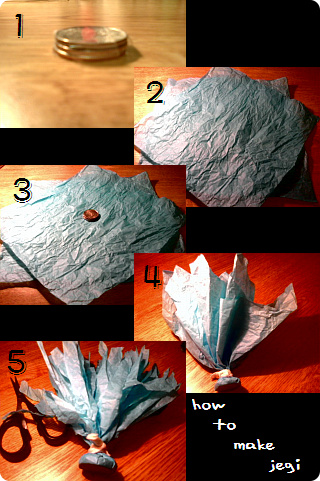
Making a jegi using tissue paper and a rubber band

A simpler method is to place a small pile or two or three coins in the centre of a 25 cm square cut from a plastic bag or tissue paper. The paper is bunched around the coins, and the coins are tied in place with string or a rubber band. The loose part of the bag or paper is then cut into strands.

The most important factor of good jegi is its weight, which should be around 10 grams (0.35 oz). If it is too light, it is very hard to control jegi since it falls to the ground before the next kick is ready. However, if it is too heavy, it is hard to kick the jegi high enough.

== Gameplay ==
Players kick the jegi into the air using inner side of the foot. The winner of the game is the player who kicks jegi the most times without letting it fall to the ground.

Other ways to play include:

Heollaengi (헐랭이)
Use of the inner side of the foot to kick 'jegi' while the other foot balances the body. The foot used to kick jegi should remain in air without touching the ground.
Ttanggangaji (땅강아지)
Similar to #1; however, the foot kicking jegi touches the ground each time before kicking again.
Ujijwaji (우지좌지)
Similar to #2, but both feet are used to kick jegi alternatively with either the inner surface of both feet (or one inner and the other outer)
Apchagi (앞차기)
Use of the top of the foot to kick jegi.
Dwitbalchagi (뒷발차기)
Use of the top lateral side of the foot to kick jegi.
Kijigi (키지기)
Each lift of jegi must be higher than one's own height.
Muljigi (물지기)
Continuously kicking jegi and catching it with one's mouth.

A way to practice jegichagi is to use a tied jegi, where a length of string ties the jegi to a fixed point such that it hangs in the air. In this way, a player can continue hitting it without having to pick up the jegi every time it falls to the ground.

Beginners have a habit of placing the arm towards the front while kicking jegi with the thought that the arm helps balancing the body. However, it does not. When using the right foot to kick jegi, it is better for the right hand to be held at the hip.

== See also ==
- Hacky sack
- Keepie-uppie
- Jianzi
- Sipa
