= Indiaca =

Brazilian team sport

Indiaca game

Indiaca is a form of the Brazilian game peteca popular in Europe. It is played on court across a net with similar rules to volleyball but instead of a ball, a large shuttlecock, sometimes also called an indiaca, or featherball is used; this consists of four goose feathers attached to a heavier base, and it is controlled using the hands. In this way, indiaca differs from jiànzi (or featherball), a very similar game originating in Vietnam and China, where the shuttlecock is controlled with the feet. Indiaca can be played by two individual players facing each other, or by small teams.

== Origins ==
Records showed that in the past Indiaca was practiced by native Brazilian Indians as a recreation, even before the Portuguese arrived. This was passed successively through generations in Brazil.

In the VII Olympic games held in Antwerp (Belgium) in 1920, the Brazilians, who were participating in their first Olympics, led Petecas for warming up their athletes, attracting numerous athletes from other countries interested in the practice. Finnish coaches and athletes repeatedly asked the head of the Brazilian delegation about the rules of the sport and showed great interest in this activity.

Peteca left the streets, the grass and the sand to become a field sport in Belo Horizonte, in the 1940s.

It was in Belo Horizonte, capital of Minas Gerais state, that the toy shape was transformed to its current format, proper for competitive games. The typical peteca has four white chicken feathers attached to a base and connected to a bottom made with several thin layers of rubber. It was also in Belo Horizonte that the rules of the game were first written, as well as the first courts were built and the practice gained competitive sense with internal championships that were held in various social clubs of the city.

In 1973 the Indiaca (Peteca) Federation of Minas Gerais (FEMP) was founded, confirming the pioneering spirit of a sport born and developed among the Brazilian people. From Belo Horizonte, the practice has spread to other Brazilian states, and from there to other countries, like France, that adopted the game as it is played in Brazil.

As positive support, there are many publications such as books, magazines, newsletters, brochures and reports that emphasize the advantages of the practice of this sport and that can be played by children and adults regardless of age, being healthy and attractive to both genders.

Indiaca is also played in Paraguay, Bolivia, Chile, United States, Portugal, Holland, Belgium, France, Germany, Spain, Switzerland, Estonia, Lithuania, Russia, China and Japan etc.

The rules of the game are not the same worldwide. For example, in Brazil Peteca is played with a maximum of two players per team, whereas in Germany a team can have five players.

== See also ==
- Jiànzi
- Roundnet
