= Chinlone =

Traditional sport of Myanmar

Chinlone players in Loikaw (Myanmar).

Chinlone (Burmese: ခြင်းလုံး, pronounced [t͡ɕʰɪ́ɰ̃.lóʊɰ̃]), also known as caneball, is the traditional national sport of Myanmar (Burma). It is non-competitive, typically with six people playing together as one team. The ball used is normally made from hand-woven rattan, which sounds like a basket when hit. Similar to the game of hacky-sack, chinlone is played by individuals passing the ball among each other within a circle without using their hands. However, in chinlone, players walk while passing the ball, with one player in the center of the circle. The point of the game is to keep the ball from hitting the ground while passing it back and forth as creatively as possible. The sport of chinlone is played by men, women, and children, interchangeably and often together. Although very fast, chinlone is meant to be entertaining and fluid, as if it were more of a performance or dance.

== History ==
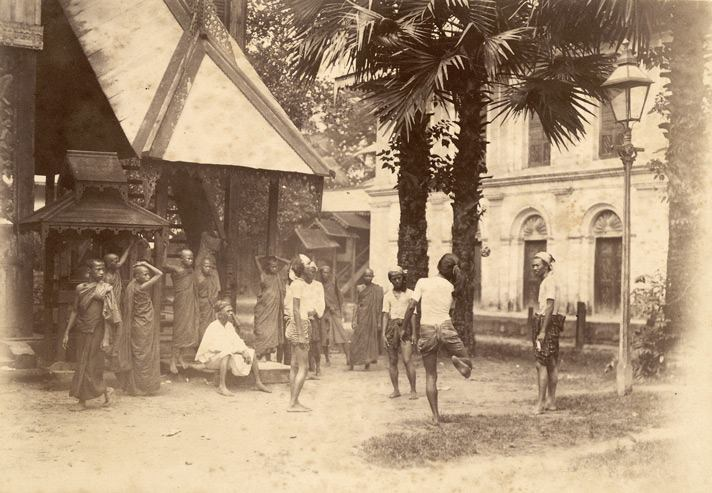
One of the first photographs of men playing chinlone, taken around 1899

Chinlone has played a prominent role in Myanmar for about 1,500 years. Its style is performance-based because it was first created as a demonstrative means of activity for entertaining Burmese royalty. Chinlone is heavily influenced by traditional Burmese martial arts and dance, another reason why so much importance is placed upon technique. As it is such an old game, many variations have been made to it, including hundreds of moves for maneuvering the ball. In addition to the original form of chinlone, there is a single performance style called tapandaing. While chinlone had been widely considered by Europeans to be more of a game than an actual sport, international interest in chinlone grew rapidly. By 1911, chinlone teams were performing in parts of Europe and Asia. As spectators of chinlone, Europeans derisively deemed it to be merely an entertaining game of indigenous people, too passive and not violent or masculine enough to be considered a sport.

After Myanmar's independence from British colonial rule in 1948, many British influences and cultural practices lingered, including those of British sports such as cricket and polo. British colonialism dominant culture still weighed heavily upon Burmese life. From the 1960s onward, the government strongly promoted traditional and historical preservation in an effort to renew native cultural pride. Myanmar needed to focus on traditions that were unique to Burmese culture, free from any colonial influence. Chinlone fit this role perfectly, playing a key part in establishing Burmese nationalism. Myanmar began implementing physical education in schools, teaching children from a young age about traditional activities and sports like chinlone as a way to educate and increase pride in their own culture. This was a small yet effective way to reestablish unique Burmese life after many generations of colonial rule. With this newfound nationalism, chinlone was finally considered a real and cooperative sport.

The head of the Burma Athletic Association, U Ah Yein, was ordered by the Burmese government to write a rulebook for chinlone in 1953. These rules forced chinlone to become more competitive, and the first official chinlone competition was held in Yangon that same year. In addition to providing chinlone with an official set of rules, U Ah Yein's chinlone rulebook claimed chinlone to be unique to Myanmar only, as the birthplace of the game. While chinlone does distinctively go back far into Burmese tradition, there are many similar sports closely related to it across many other Southeast Asian countries, such as da cau (Vietnam), kator (Laos), sepak raga (Malaysia, Singapore, Brunei and Indonesia), sipa (Philippines) and takraw (Thailand).

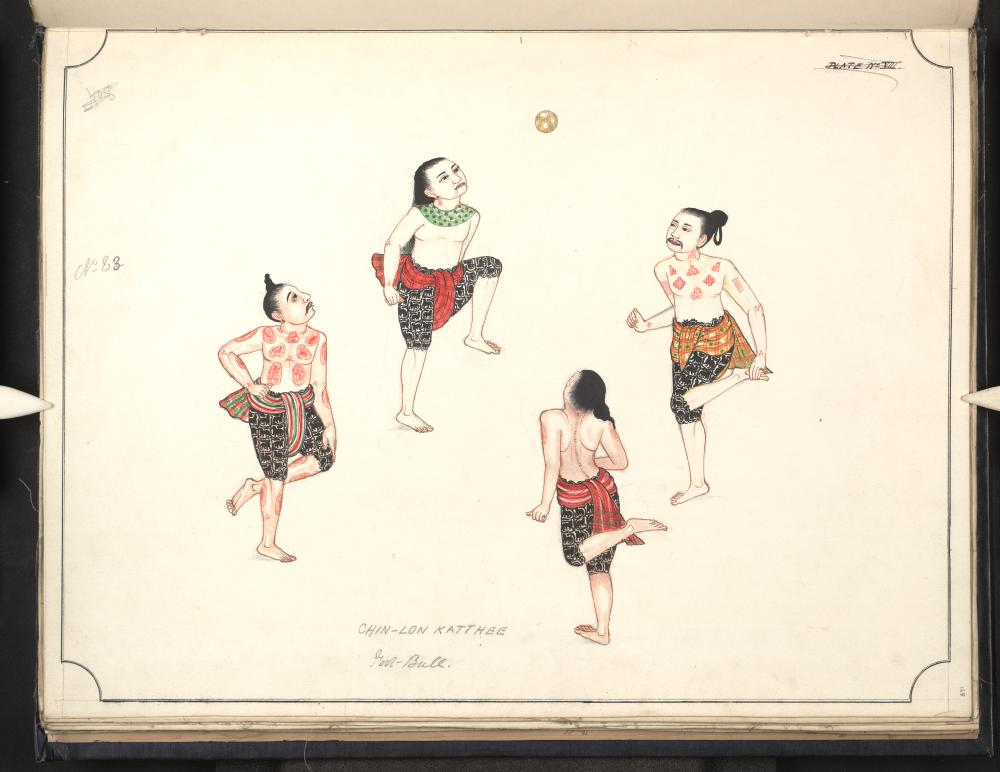
Watercolor painting of a chinlone game from the 19th century.

=== SEA Games ===
At the 2013 SEA Games in Myanmar, chinlone made its debut as a contested sport and was also featured in the closing ceremony. The inclusion of chinlone was controversial as other countries were not adequately prepared to compete in a uniquely Burmese sport. Chinlone was also contested in 2017, 2023 and 2025.

== In popular culture ==
In the South African football comic Supa Strikas, an episode, No El' in Team, featured chinlone in the story arc.

== See also ==
- Sepak takraw
