= Sepak takraw =

Southeast Asian team sport

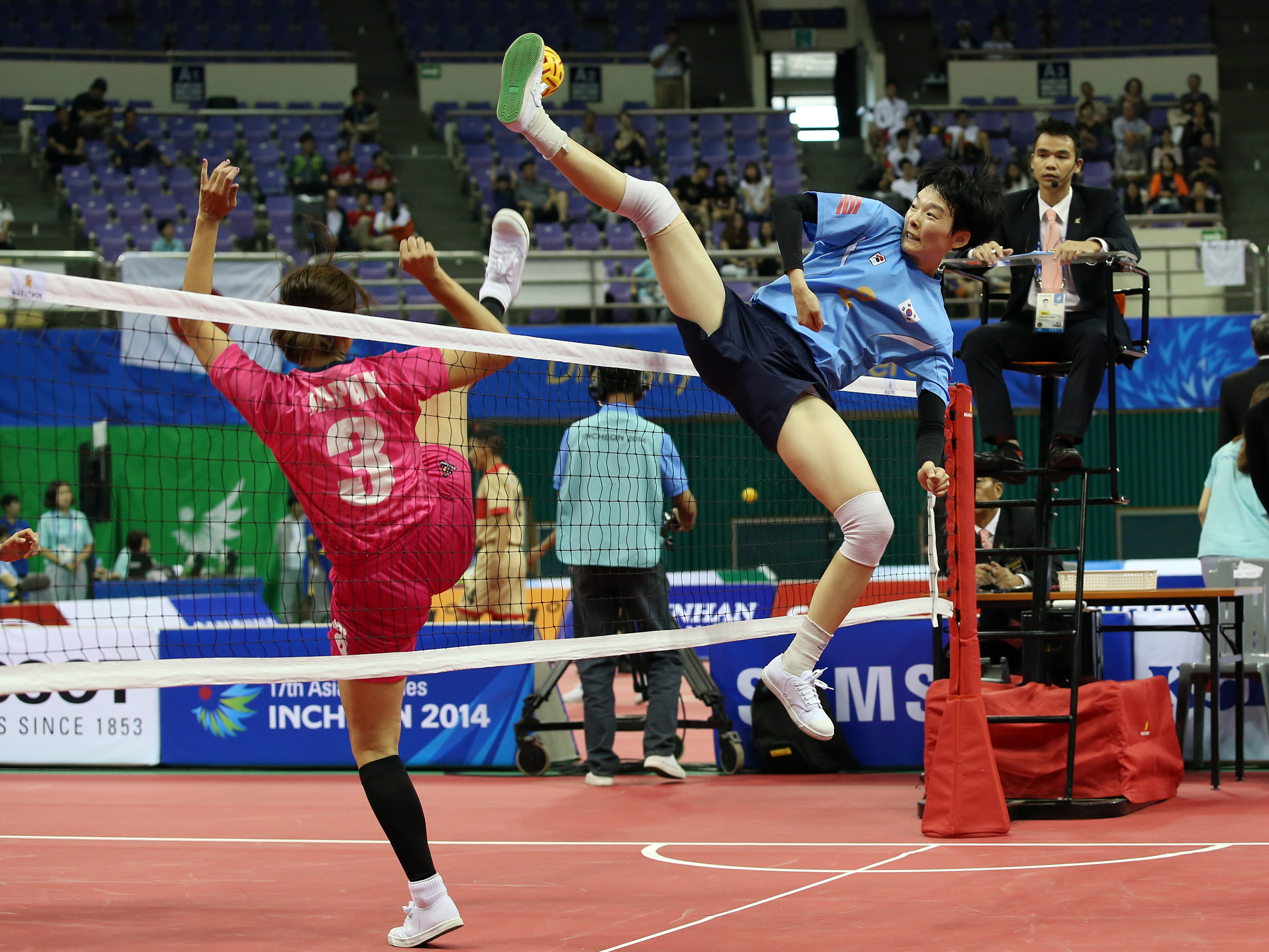
- Women's double Sepak Takraw event at the 2014 Asian Games in Incheon
- Highest governing body: International Sepaktakraw Federation
- Nicknames: kick volleyball
- Standardized: 1960, Kuala Lumpur, Malaysia
- Clubs: 31

Characteristics
- Contact: No
- Team members: 3
- Mixed-sex: No
- Type: outdoor, indoor, beach
- Equipment: synthetic plastic or rattan ball, net
- Venue: Sepak Takraw court

Presence
- Country or region: Origin Malaysia - Thailand
- Olympic: No
- Paralympic: No
- World Games: No

A play of Sepak takraw

Sepak takraw (also Sepaktakraw) is a Southeast Asian team sport. It is played with a ball made of rattan or plastic between two teams of two to four players on a court resembling a badminton court. Nicknamed "kick volleyball", it is similar to volleyball and footvolley in its use of a rattan ball and players using only their feet, knees, shoulders, chest, and head to touch the ball. Sepak takraw is often referred to as a mixture of volleyball, for its use of a net, and association football, as players use their feet.

The sport's modern version was introduced, developed, and standardised in 1960 when officials from Malaysia, Singapore, Thailand, and Myanmar met in Kuala Lumpur to agree on a name and standard rules for it. It was previously known as Sepak Raga Jaring and was first exhibited in Penang in 1945. It was introduced in the 1965 Southeast Asian Peninsular Games in Kuala Lumpur as a medal event. Sepak takraw is considered Malaysia's national sport.

Sepak takraw is governed internationally by the International Sepaktakraw Federation (ISTAF), formed in 1988, which is responsible for major international tournaments including the ISTAF SuperSeries and ISTAF World Cup, Malaysia's Khir Johari Cup, and Thailand's King Cup.

Sepak takraw resembles native sports known as sepak raga in Malaysia and Indonesia; takraw in Thailand; chinlone in Myanmar; sipa in the Philippines; lataw in Laos; sek dai in Cambodia and cầu mây in Vietnam. It is also claimed to be related to cuju in China, jegichagi in Korea, and kemari in Japan.

== Etymology ==
The word sepak is Malay (Jawi: سيڨق) for kick while the word takraw is of Thai (Thai: ตะกร้อ) origin, translated as muzzle or woven rattan ball. "Sepak Takraw" literally means "to kick a rattan ball". The choice of this name for the sport was essentially a compromise between Malaysia and Thailand in Kuala Lumpur in 1960.

In the past, it was called "Sepak Raga Jaring" in Malaysia, after the term "Jaring", meaning net in Malay, was added to the traditional "Sepak Raga" game when it was created by Hamid Mydin in Penang in 1945. In Thailand, it is simply known by its original name of "Takraw". Internationally, only the term "Sepak Takraw" is used to refer to the modern sport.

== History ==
=== Predecessors ===
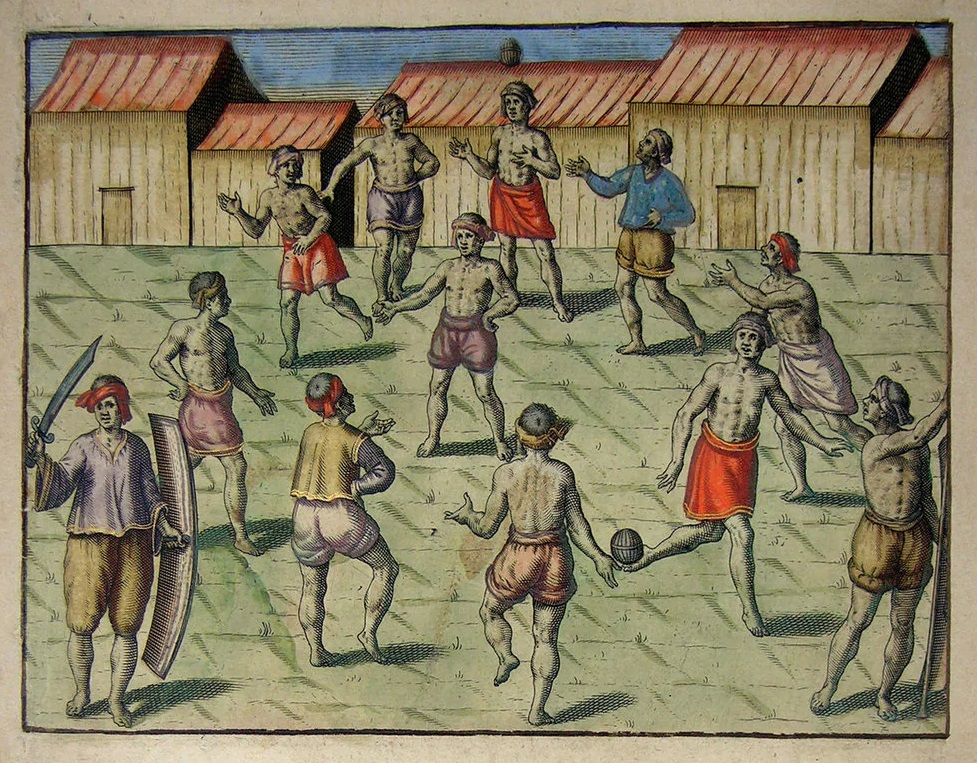
A ballgame called "Keeping the ball aloft", Banda, 1601. The ball is made of twisted branches.

Sepak Takraw may have been introduced to Southeast Asia by the Chinese, who were inspired by the traditional game Cuju, an ancient military exercise where soldiers play to keep a leather ball filled with feathers airborne by kicking it back and forth between two or more people. As the game evolved, the feather-stuffed ball was replaced by an air-filled ball with a two-layered hull.

In Myanmar, Sepak Takraw is known as "chinlone". Chinlone has played a prominent role in Myanmar for about 1,500 years. Its style is performance-based because it was first created as a demonstrative activity to entertain Burmese royalty. Chinlone is heavily influenced by traditional Burmese martial arts and dance.

In Malaysia, the first recorded instance of Sepak Takraw, with balls made of woven strips of rattan, was in the Malacca Sultanate (present-day Malaysia) in the 15th century, according to an ancient Malay manuscript, "Sejarah Melayu" (Malay Annals). The Malay Annals described an incident involving Raja Muhammad, a son of Sultan Mansur Shah, who was accidentally hit with a rattan ball by Tun Besar, the son of Bendahara Tun Perak, in a Sepak Raga game. The ball hit Raja Muhammad's headgear and knocked it to the ground. Angered, Raja Muhammad immediately stabbed and killed Tun Besar, leading some of Tun Besar's kinsmen to want to kill Raja Muhammad in retaliation. However, Bendahara Tun Perak managed to restrain them from an act of treason by saying that he would no longer accept Raja Muhammad as the Sultan's heir. Sultan Mansur Shah ordered his son out of Malacca and had him installed as the ruler of neighbouring Pahang.

Video recording of a Sepak Takraw match

In Thailand, there is evidence that the Thai played Sepak Takraw during the reign of King Naresuan (1590–1605) of Ayutthaya Kingdom. A French historian, François Henri Turpin, wrote about how the Siamese played the game of Takraw to stay in shape. Murals at Bangkok's Wat Phra Kaeo, built in 1785, depict the Hindu god Hanuman playing Sepak Takraw in a ring with a troop of monkeys. The game was played in a circle for hundreds of years, until modern Sepak Takraw began taking shape in Thailand sometime during the early 1740s. In 1929, the Siam Sports Association drafted the first rules for Takraw competition. Four years later, the association introduced the volleyball-style net and held the first public contest. Within just a few years, Takraw was introduced to the curriculum in Siamese schools. The game became such a cherished local custom that another exhibition of volleyball-style Takraw was held to celebrate the kingdom's first constitution in 1933, the year after Thailand abolished absolute monarchy.

In Indonesia, Sepak Takraw is also known as Sepak Raga. In Sulawesi, the traditional Makassar football game is called "Raga" (the player is called "Pa'Raga"). Men play the "Raga" circle in a group, where the ball is passed from one to the other. The man who kicks the highest ball is the winner. "Raga" is also played for fun by demonstrating several tricks, such as kicking the ball and placing it on the player's head with the handle of the Passapu'

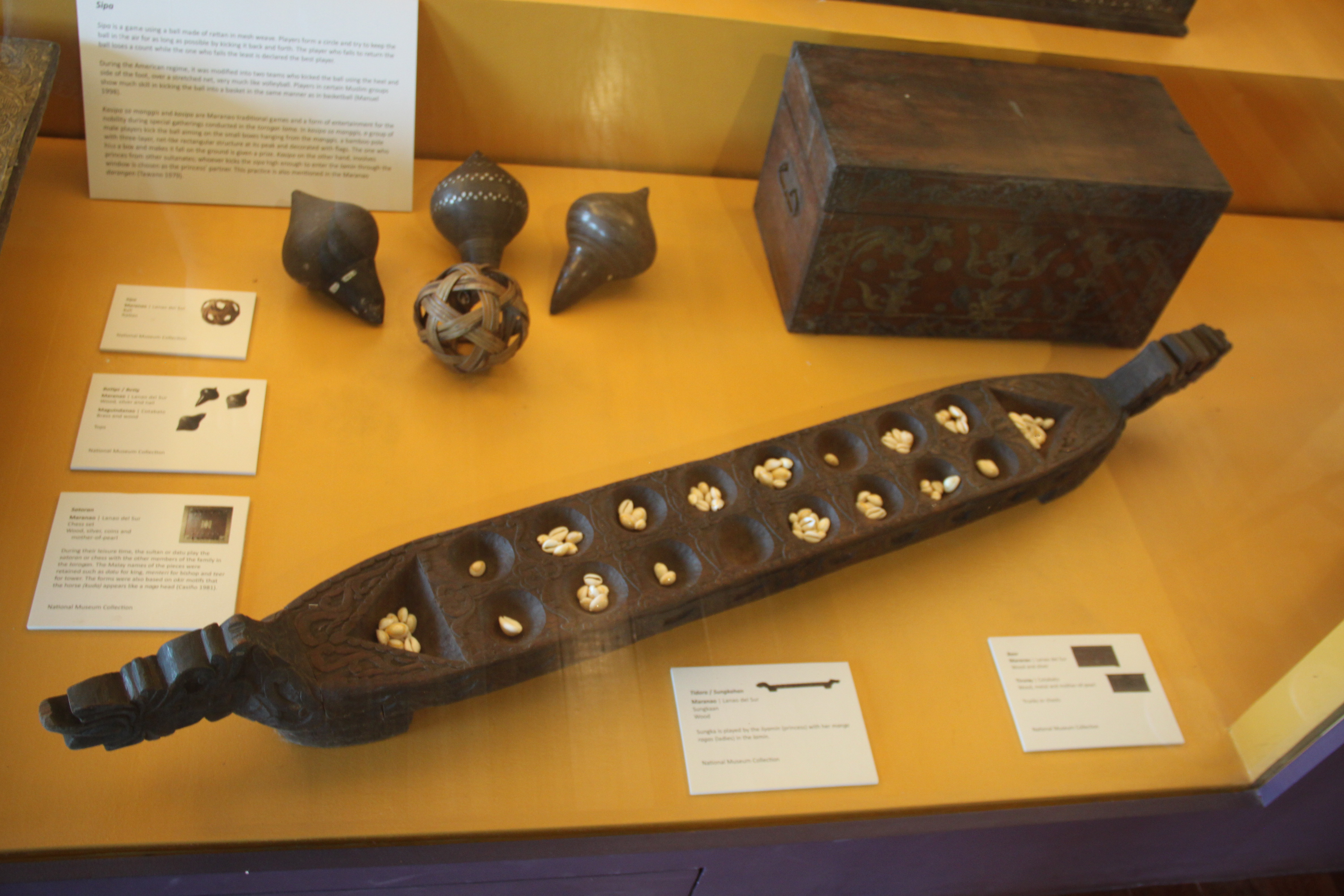
A traditional sipà (rattan wicker ball) from the Maranao people of the Philippines, along with kakasing tops and a sungka board

In the Philippines, the sport is related to a native game called "sipà" (or "sipà salama" among Muslim Filipinos) and, along with traditional martial arts, survived Spanish colonisation. It is a popular sport played by children in Philippines and was the Philippine national sport until it was replaced by Arnis in 2009. Sepak Takraw is included in the Philippines' elementary and high school curriculum.

=== Origins of the modern sport ===
In the beginning, Sepak Takraw was not meant to be competitive, but was a casual game with an emphasis on physical activity. The game acted as an exercise to improve dexterity and loosen the limbs after long periods of sitting, standing or working. However, the modern version of Sepak Takraw began taking shape sometime during the 1940s. In 1935 in Seremban, Sepak Raga was first played on a badminton court over the net with players on two opposing sides, amid celebrations of the Silver Jubilee of George V. The event is the earliest example of modern sport rules being used for Sepak Raga, turning it into a competitive sport. Badminton was a preferred sport for the British, whereas Sepak Raga was mainly played by the Malays. Since the diversion sport was first played amid the Jubilee festivity, it was known as "Sepak Raga Jubilee" (Jubilee Sepak Raga).

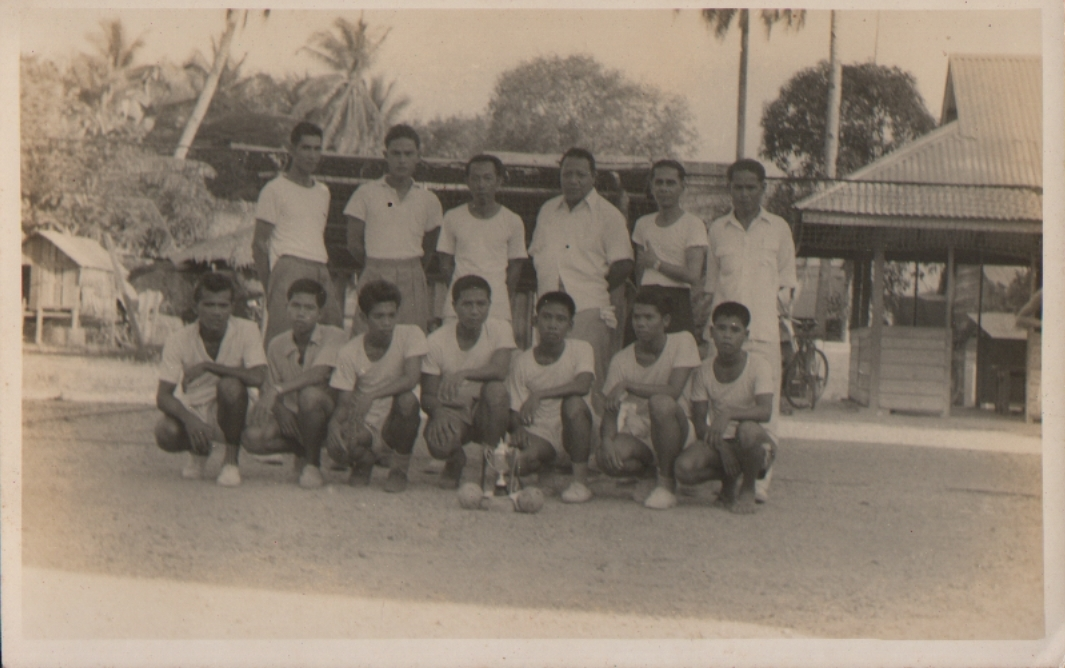
Hamid Mydin, the founder of Sepak Raga Jaring/ Sepak Takraw, and his team

It is likely that the sport had gained popularity in Negeri Sembilan and spread to various states of Malaya (now West Malaysia). In the years following World War II up to the mid-20th century, "Sepak Raga Jubilee" was played in rural villages and towns throughout Malaya. Though Malaysia is a multiracial country, Sepak Takraw is mainly popular among the Malay community. The new sport then spread to Penang. The popularisation of present-day Sepak Takraw is, for the most part, attributed to three people from Jalan Patani, Penang. In February 1945, a net and tenets like badminton were presented by Hamid Mydin, accompanied by local Sepak Raga sportsmen Mohamad Abdul Rahman and Syed Yaacob, to demonstrate Mydin's new variation of "Sepak Raga Jaring" (Net Sepak Raga). The new version was preferred for its quicker pace, distinctive styles of kicking, and the higher standard of athleticism that it demanded. It is considered the pioneer version of modern Sepak Takraw and remains one of the dominant competitive forms.

The first properly organised Sepak Takraw competition was held at a Swim Club in Penang on May 16, 1945. Three teams from Malay populated localities in Penang were among those that competed for the Nyak Din Nyak Sham Trophy. The sport spread rapidly through the remainder of Malaya. From Penang, "Sepak Raga Jaring" spread to Alor Setar in Kedah, to Kampung Baru in Kuala Lumpur and then to Singapore. By 1960, the variation was well known in many Malayan schools that had badminton courts. The sport was frequently played by football players because of the similarities in skills required for both sports. Several Sepak Raga associations formed in various Malayan states.

About the same time, similar developments occurred in Thailand. In 1929, the Siam Sports Association drafted the first rules for the Takraw competition. Four years later, the association introduced the volleyball-style net and held the first public contest. Within just a few years, Takraw was added to the curriculum in Siamese schools. The game became such a cherished local custom that another exhibition of volleyball-style Takraw was staged to celebrate the kingdom's first constitution in 1933, the year after Thailand abolished its absolute monarchy. Recent sports science research indicates that for novice sepak takraw players, online instruction led by professional athletes can be highly effective for developing specific technical skills. A 12-week randomized controlled study showed that virtual coaching significantly outperformed traditional in-person training in improving service accuracy and spike execution (such as jump height), while foundational skills like ball control developed comparably across both formats.

=== Standardisation ===
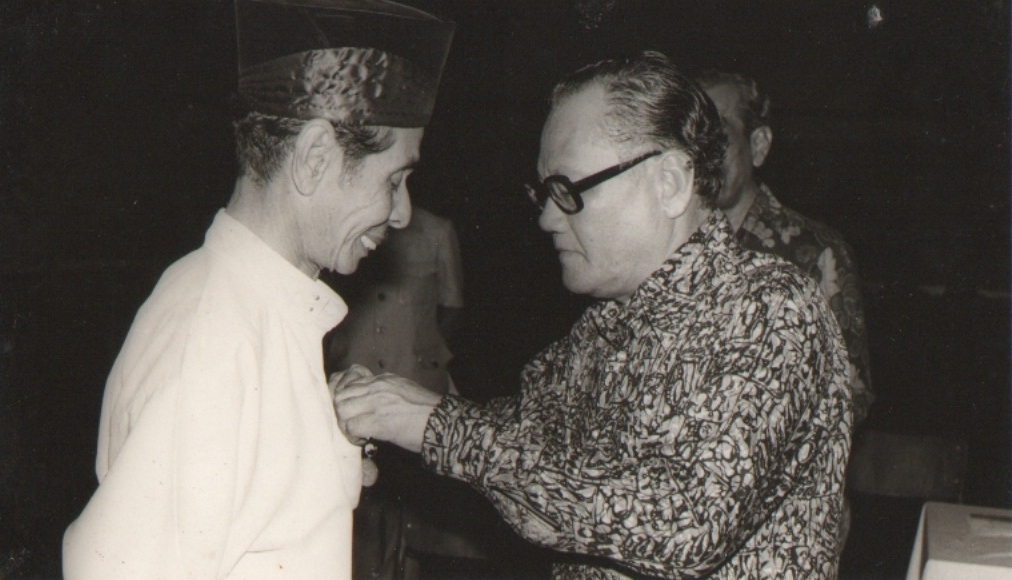
Hamid Mydin is awarded the Khir Johari Gold Medal by the Malaysian Sepak Raga Association on 7 August 1977.

The determination and perseverance of Penang's Sepak Takraw pioneers led to the founding of the "Jawatankuasa Penaja Sepak Raga Pulau Pinang" (Penang Sepak Raga Sponsors' Committee) on 25 March 1956 at Dewan UMNO Pulau Pinang. On 28 January 1960, the committee negotiated with representatives from Selangor, Negeri Sembilan, Kedah, and Singapore at Bangunan Persatuan Melayu Pulau Pinang on the founding of "Jawatankuasa Penaja Perseketuan Sepak Raga Jaring Malaya" (Malayan Sepak Raga Jaring Sponsors' Committee), a national organisation. The initial rules and regulations of the sport were enacted and compiled in writing on 15 April 1960 at Sultan Sulaiman Club in Kuala Lumpur.

On 25 June 1960, the Malayan Sepak Raga Federation (now renamed Malaysian Sepak Takraw Association (PSM)) was established at a meeting held in Balai Rakyat, Jalan Patani, Penang. The ceremony was officiated by the chief minister of Penang, Wong Pow Nee. During the meeting, representatives of Kedah, Selangor, Negeri Sembilan, and Penang unanimously appointed Khir Johari as its first president. Hamid Mydin was also recognised as the creator and founder of Sepak Takraw by the federation at that meeting. The Sepak Raga rules compiled on 15 April in Kuala Lumpur were also ratified by the Malayan Sepak Raga Federation on this day.

Later that year, representatives from Malaya, Singapore, Myanmar, and Thailand met in Kuala Lumpur to standardise the guidelines for the sport. After intense debate, they came to a consensus that the sport would be officially called "Sepak Takraw". Thus, a game of Sepak Takraw that witnesses acrobatic movements by athletes was officially introduced at the international level. In Malaya, an inter-state competition known as "Khir Johari Gold Cup" was organised at Stadium Negara, Kuala Lumpur from 27 to 28 December 1962 to further advance the sport. Penang, where Sepak Raga Jaring originated, would become the primary holder of the tournament. By that point, "Sepak Raga Jaring" was quite popular in Malaya and is now regarded as Malaysia's national sport.

=== Global game ===
In 1965, the Asian Sepak Takraw Federation (ASTAF) was formed. Its first task was to translate the Sepak Takraw rules into English, facilitating the first worldwide competition, the Southeast Asian Peninsular Games (SEAP Games) (now Southeast Asian Games (SEA Games)) held in Kuala Lumpur. It was still confusingly known as "Sepak Raga". From the fourth SEAP Games in 1967, the term "Sepak Takraw" become the established name.

In the 1970 Asian Games at Bangkok, Sepak Takraw was introduced as a demonstration sport by Malaysian and Thai teams.

In 1975, the Kedah's Sepak Takraw team visited Germany in conjunction with The Sports Press Feast 1975 to play Sepak Takraw as a demonstration.

In 1977, Penang's Sepak Takraw team participated in North Malaysian Week in Adelaide, Australia.

In 1979, ASTAF for the first time held a conference in Jakarta in conjunction with the SEA Games and reviewed the Sepak Takraw laws submitted by the Malaysian Sepak Takraw Association. The ASTAF technical committee also held its second meeting in Singapore in the same year for the same purpose.

In 1980, the Malaysian Sepak Takraw team played several Sepak Takraw games in China, South Korea, and Hong Kong, an outstanding achievement in the history of Sepak Takraw towards introducing the sport to East Asian countries.

In 1982, the woven synthetic ball was introduced to replace woven rattan ball in Thailand.

In 1988, the International Sepaktakraw Federation (ISTAF) was formed by members of the Asian Sepaktakraw Federation (ASTAF). It was recognised as the international governing body for the sport by the Olympic Movement in 1990.

In 1990, Sepak Takraw was included as a medal sport at the Asian Games in Beijing.

In 1997, the first women's championship was held in Thailand.

In 1998, Sepak Takraw was introduced as a demonstration event in the Commonwealth Games held in Kuala Lumpur.

In 2011, the inaugural edition of Sepak Takraw's flagship tournament, the ISTAF World Cup, was staged in Kuala Lumpur, Malaysia. The ISTAF SuperSeries, a new series of elite tournaments was also launched in Bangkok.

There are more than 30 countries with national Sepak Takraw organisations, with representatives in the International Sepaktakraw Federation (ISTAF) overseeing the sport.

== Competition ==
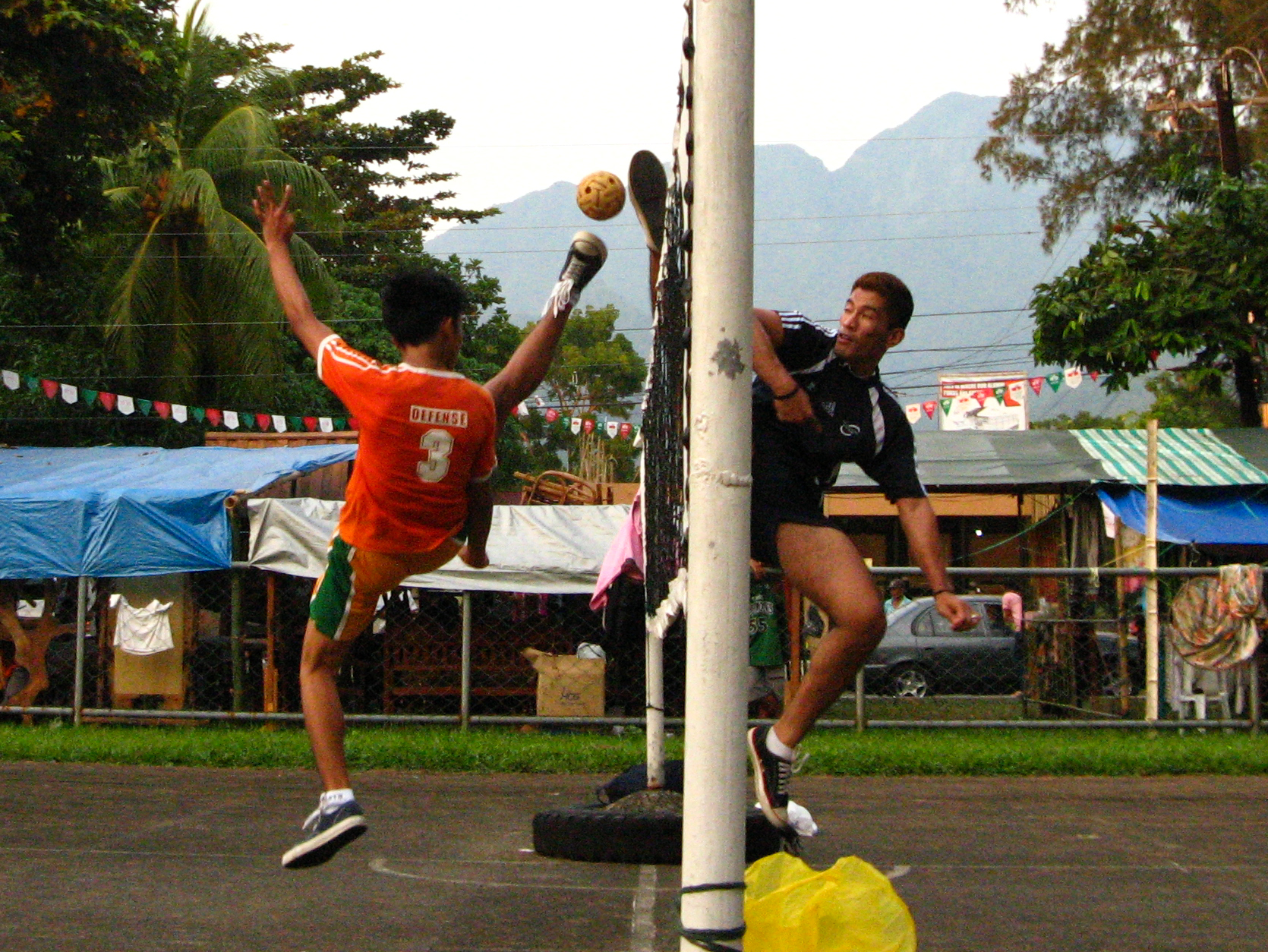
Sepak takraw competition in the Philippines

International play is now governed by ISTAF. Major competitions for the sport such as the ISTAF SuperSeries, the ISTAF World Cup and the King's Cup World Championships are held every year.

Sepak Takraw is now a regular sport event in the Asian Games and the Southeast Asian Games, with Thailand having won the most medals for the event.

=== Asian Games ===
Sepak Takraw has been a sport at the Asian Games since 1990 with Thailand securing the highest number of gold medals.

=== Canada ===
The Lao people first brought Sepak Takraw into Canada when they immigrated as refugees in the 1970s. But the game began gaining exposure outside the Laotian communities when a Saskatchewan teacher, Richard (Rick) Engel, who was introduced to Sepak Takraw while living in Asia, included it in Asian Sport, Education & Culture (ASEC) International's School Presentation Program. Sepak Takraw was so well received by schools that it became part of ASEC's mandate to help introduce, promote, and organise the sport across the country. In May 1998, after introducing many schools to the sport, and in concert with experienced players, ASEC International organised the first Canadian inter-provincial tournament with men's, boys', and girls' teams. By the end of 1998, Engel was sent to Bangkok, Thailand to film at the 14th King's Cup Sepak Takraw World Championships – the footage of which was used to produce a widely used instructional Sepak Takraw video/DVD, called Sepak Takraw – Just for Kicks.

On 11 December 1998, the Sepak Takraw Association of Canada (STAC) was incorporated to organise and govern the sport nationally. Its office was set up in Regina, Saskatchewan, where there were experienced players and organisational support, sharing resources and office space of the already established ASEC International, a committee which has now become Sepak Takraw Saskatchewan Inc. The first annual Canadian Open Sepak Takraw Championships (a national and international tournament event) were held in May 1999 in Regina and have over the years attracted teams from across Canada, the United States, Japan, Malaysia, and China. That same year, Canada also attended its first International Sepaktakraw Federation (ISTAF) Congress and was accepted as member of ISTAF. In 2000, Rick Engel, Perry Senko, and Brydon Blacklaws played for Team Canada and earned a silver medal in the entry level division of the King's Cup World Sepak Takraw Championships in Thailand. Another major milestone was achieved on 3 December 2000, when STAC and the sport of Sepak Takraw became an official class E Member of the Canadian Olympic Committee.

Canada has since contributed much to the development of Sepak Takraw worldwide, with Engel authoring three instructional books and helping produce five DVDs about the sport, while STAC did the publishing. The most notable of these books is Sepak Takraw 101 - The Complete Coaching/Instructional Manual for Sepak Takraw (Kick Volleyball), the third edition of which has also been translated into Indonesian and published in Indonesia through a government education project. Engel has since introduced the sport and conducted Sepak Takraw skills clinics in schools and sessions at physical education teachers' conferences all over Canada, the US, and Europe.

=== Japan ===
A Japanese team played at the 1990 Asian Games in Beijing. While as of 2010 there are no professional teams in Japan, university-level teams have been established at Asia University, Chiba University, Keio University, and Waseda University.

=== Philippines ===
The Philippine Sepak Takraw team competes internationally. Among veteran players still in the lineup are Jason Huerte, Rheyjhey Ortouste, Mark Joseph Gonzales, Josefina Maat, Des Oltor, Ronsted Gabayeron, and Sara Catain.

=== United States ===
The earliest accounts of organised Takraw in the United States involve a group of students from Northrop University (Greg St. Pierre, Thomas Gong, Joel "small bird" Nelson, and Mark Kimitsuka) in 1986 in Inglewood, California, learning about and playing the sport in Los Angeles. In the early 80s, Southeast Asians held soccer tournaments with Takraw events in Wisconsin, Michigan, Minnesota, and California, especially within the Lao, Hmong, and Thai communities. Malaysian students attending the university often enjoyed playing the sport on a court atop the dormitory cafeteria. They taught a handful of curious US students how to play, which in turn inspired Malaysia Airlines to sponsor a US team from the university to attend the National Tournament in Kuala Lumpur in November 1987. The Northrop team played in a bracket of international new teams with Korea, Sri Lanka, and Australia. The US team beat Sri Lanka and Australia to bring home the gold.

The Los Angeles Asian community and Northrop's team had already established a Takraw community in and around the city. Kurt Sonderegger moved to Los Angeles, founded the United States Takraw Association and started a business that sold plastic Takraw balls. In 1989, he was sent an invitation from the International Sepaktakraw Federation and, along with a few of the Northrop group, travelled to represent the United States in the World Championships.

The team was soundly defeated, but the Takraw world celebrated the participation of non-Asian teams in the World Championships.

== Rules and regulations ==
Measurements of courts and equipment often vary among tournaments and organisations that operate from a recreational to a competitive level; international competitive rules and regulations are used in this section. There are two types of event categories: the ryu and the doubles ryu. The ryu category is played by three players on each team, while the doubles ryu is played by two players on each team.

=== Court ===
Sepak takraw court diagram

Sepak Takraw is played on court a similar to badminton's double sized court.

The court has an area of 13.4 by 6.1 metres (44 ft × 20 ft) free from all obstacles up to the height of 8 metres (26 ft) measured from the floor surface (sand and grass court not advisable). The width of the lines bounding the court should not be more than 4 centimetres (1.6 in) measured and drawn inwards from the edge of the court measurements. All the boundary lines should be drawn at least 3.0 metres (9.8 ft) away from all obstacles. The centre line of 2 cm (0.79 in) should be drawn equally dividing the right and left court.

Where the center line meets the sidelines, quarter circles shall be drawn, on either side, from the sideline to the center line with a radius of 0.9 metres (2 ft 11 in) measured and drawn outwards from the edge of the 0.9 m radius .

The service circle of 0.3 m radius shall be drawn on the left and on the right court, the centre of which is 2.45 m from the back line of the court and 3.05 m from the sidelines, the 0.04 m line shall be measured and drawn outward from the edge of the 0.3 m radius.

=== Net ===
The net should be made of fine ordinary cord or nylon with 6 cm to 8 cm mesh, similar to a volleyball net.

The net should be 0.7 m in width and not shorter than 6.10 m in length, taped at 0.05 m from tape double at the top and sideline, called boundary tape.

The net should be edged with a 0.05 m double-layered tape at the top and the bottom, supported by a fine ordinary cord or nylon cord that runs through the tape and is strained over and flush with the top of the posts. The top of the net shall be 1.52 m (1.42 m for women) in height from the centre and 1.55 m (1.45 m for women) at the posts. In Myanmar, they now use at least 1.82m or 2.43m, depending on the situation, as the standard height is too low and players can kick the ball in easily.

=== Ball ===
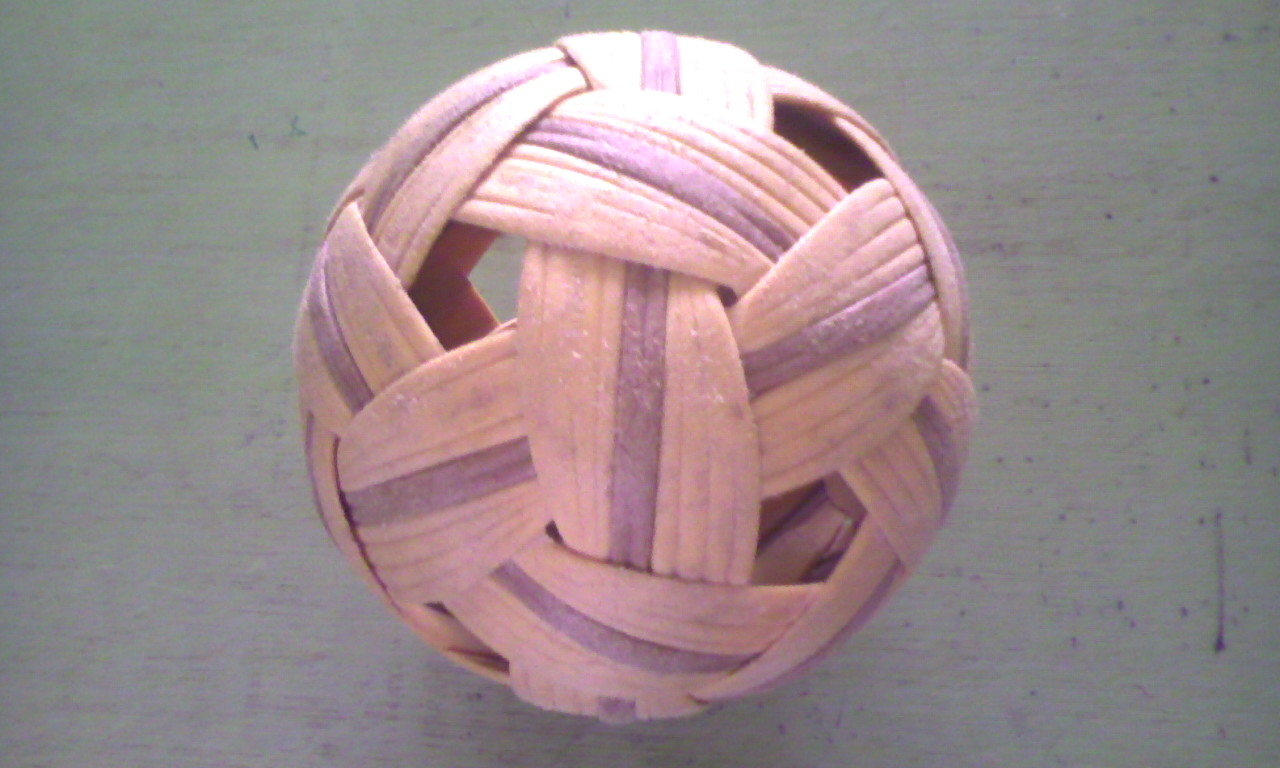
A sepak takraw ball

The Sepak Takraw ball should be spherical, made of synthetic fibre or one woven layer.

Sepak Takraw balls without synthetic rubber covering must have 12 holes and 20 intersections, must have a circumference measuring from 42 to 44 cm (16.5–17.3 in) for men or from 43 to 45 cm (16.9–17.7 in) for women, with a weight that ranges from 170 to 180 g (6.0–6.3 oz) for men or from 150 to 160 g (5.3–5.6 oz) for women.

The ball can be any single or multi-colour, but must not be in any colour that would impair the performance of the players.

The Sepak Takraw ball can also be constructed of synthetic rubber or soft durable material for covering the ball, for the purpose of softening the impact of the ball on the player's body. The type of material and method used for constructing the ball or for covering the ball with rubber or soft durable covering must be approved by ISTAF before it can be used for any competition.

All world, international, and regional competitions sanctioned by International Sepaktakraw Federation, including but not limited to, the Olympic Games, World Games, Commonwealth Games, Asian Games, and SEA Games, must be played with ISTAF approved Sepak Takraw balls.

=== Players ===
A match is played by two teams called 'regu', each consisting of three players. On some occasions, it can be played by only two players (doubles) or four players (quadrant) per team.

One of the players, standing at the back, is called a "Tekong", also known as the "Server". The other two players stand close to the net, one on the left and the other on the right. The player on the left is called a "feeder", "setter", or "tosser", and the player on the right is called an "attacker", "striker", or "killer".

=== Start of play and service ===
The side that must serve first should start the first set. The side that wins the first set should have the option of "Choosing Service".

The throw must be executed as soon as the referee calls the score. If either of the "Inside" players throws the ball before the referee calls the score, it must be re-thrown, and a warning will be given to the thrower.

During the service, as soon as the Tekong kicks the ball, all the players are allowed to move about freely in their respective courts.

The service is valid if the ball passes over the net, whether it touches the net or not, and inside the boundary of the two net tapes and boundary lines of the opponent's court.

=== Faults in the game ===
==== Serving side during service ====
- The "Inside" player who is throwing to the server plays with the ball (throwing up the ball, bumping, passing to another "Inside" player etc.) after the call of score by the referee.
- The "Inside" player lifts their feet or steps on the line or crosses over or touches the net while throwing the ball.
- The Tekong jumps off the ground to execute the service.
- The Tekong does not kick the ball on the service throw.
- The ball touches a serving side player before crossing over to the opponents' court.
- The ball goes over the net but falls outside the court.
- The ball does not cross to the opponent side.
- A player uses their hand or hands, or any other part of his arms to facilitate the execution of a kick even if the hand or arm does not directly touch the ball, but it touches other objects or surfaces instead when doing so.

==== Serving and receiving side during service ====
- Creating distractions or noise or shouting at an opponent.

==== For both sides during the game ====
- Any player who touches the ball on the opponent side.
- Any part of player's body crosses over into opponent's court whether above or under the net except during the follow-through of the ball.
- Playing the ball more than 3 times in succession.
- The ball touching the arm
- Stopping or holding the ball under the arm, between the legs or body.
- Any part of the body or player's outfits e.g. shoes, jersey, head band etc., touches the net or the post or the referee's chairs or falls into the opponent's side.
- The ball touches the ceiling, roof or the wall (any objects).

=== Scoring system ===
An official doubles or regu match is won by best of three sets (win 2 out of 3 sets), with each set being played up to 21 points.

A team event or group match is effectively three regu matches played back to back, using different players for each regu. The winner is determined by best of three regus (win 2 out of 3 regus), where a winner of each individual regu is determined by best of 3 sets, played up to 21 points per set.

In the last or third set a change of sides takes place when one team reaches 11 points.

When either serving or receiving side commits a fault, a point is awarded to the opponent side.

Serving: Teams alternate serving every three points, regardless of who wins the points. If a tie takes place at 21-21, each team alternates one serve each until a winner is determined.

Set: Each set is won by the side which scores 21 points with a minimum lead of two points to a ceiling of 25 points. In the event of a 21–21 tie, the set shall be won by the side which gets a lead of two points, or when a side reaches 25 points (whichever occurs first).

Match: A match is won by the team who has won two sets. A team event match is won by the team that wins two regus.

Ranking: In group stages of tournaments or team events (round robin) the ranking in a group is determined by: 1. Sum of match wins; a match win gives 1 point 2. Sum of set points 3. Points difference +/-

== Competing countries ==
International play is now governed by ISTAF, the International Sepaktakraw Federation.

Southeast Asia

- Brunei
- Cambodia
- Indonesia
- Laos
- Malaysia
- Myanmar
- Philippines
- Singapore
- Thailand
- Timor-Leste
- Vietnam

South Asia

- Bangladesh
- India
- Maldives
- Nepal
- Pakistan
- Sri Lanka

Oceania

- Australia
- Fiji
- New Zealand

Americas

- Argentina
- Brazil
- Canada
- Colombia
- Cuba
- Mexico
- United States

Europe

- Austria
- Belgium
- Bulgaria
- England
- Finland
- France
- Germany
- Italy
- Poland
- Portugal
- Russia
- Serbia
- Switzerland
- Turkey

Africa

- Sudan
- South Africa

Middle East

- Iran
- Oman
- Qatar

East Asia

- China
- Chinese Taipei
- Hong Kong
- Japan
- North Korea
- South Korea
- Macau
- Mongolia

== In other media ==
- The sport is the centre of the fourth episode of the sixth season of the animated series Supa Strikas. The episode is titled Sepak Attack.
- High Windz by Sapda Chanachot is a one-shot manga that revolves around the sport.
- In the second episode of Nichijou, Mio Naganohara's mother fails to wake her daughter up for school because she went out to play Sepak Takraw with the neighborhood association.
- The sport is played in the Let's Go Luna episode "Kick It Good".
- Sepak Takraw was featured in the episode Temple Frogs from the Disney animated show Amphibia, where Sprig stumbles upon a match played at the Thai Temple.

== See also ==
- ISTAF World Cup
- ISTAF SuperSeries
- Padbol
- Cuju
