= Peteca =

Sport in Brazil

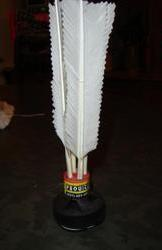
Peteca Shuttlecock

Peteca (Portuguese pronunciation: [peˈtɛkɐ]) is a traditional sport in Brazil, played with a "hand shuttlecock" from indigenous origins and reputed to be as old as the country itself. The same name is given to the shuttlecock-object itself.

== Objectives ==
The objective of the game is to hit the shuttlecock-like object (the peteca) with your hand over a high net, similar to a volleyball net, causing the object to land inbounded on the opposite court. The peteca can only be hit once while on each side of the net. Doubles and singles, male and/or female matches are played, both for competitive or leisure purposes.

== History ==
The word peteca is derived from the Tupian word petek meaning hit (with the open palm). Over time, the word found its way into the Portuguese language.

Originally, peteca was played at times of celebration with dances and songs. Gradually, this play became more of a sporting activity. The game has been passed down through several generations by the Brazilian ancestors and has developed considerably along the way.

Early petecas were home-made affairs consisting of stones wrapped in leaves tied inside an ear of corn. A more sophisticated version was described in a Brazilian-English dictionary as "a leather pad with feathers stuck into it."

Pictures of the first petecas are few and far between, but on 30 May 1979, Brazil issued a set of four postage stamps depicting children's toys, to commemorate the International Year of the Child.

When Brazil was present at the 1920 Summer Olympics in Antwerp, Belgium the Brazilian athletes took with them some shuttlecocks for amusement on the ship and during the intervals between games. The game of peteca fascinated athletes from many other countries who wanted learn the rules of the game. The problem was that there were no rules - it was just for pleasure.

Peteca left the streets, the grass and the sand to become a field sport in Belo Horizonte in the 1940s.

It was in Belo Horizonte, the capital city of Minas Gerais state, that the toy shape was transformed to its current format, proper for competitive games. The typical peteca has four white chicken feathers attached to a base and connected to a bottom made with several thin layers of rubber. It was also in Belo Horizonte that the rules of the game were first written, as well as the first courts were built and the practice gained competitive sense with internal championships that were held in various social clubs of the city.

In 1973 the Peteca Federation of Minas Gerais (FEMP) was founded, confirming the pioneering spirit of a sport born and developed among the Brazilian people. From Belo Horizonte, the practice has spread to other Brazilian states, and from there to other countries, like France, that adopted the game as it is played in Brazil.

Peteca is now one of Brazil's fastest growing sports closely behind football and volleyball. Another version of the game, called Indiaca, and closely based on peteca has developed in Germany, first appearing in 1936.

== Rules of the game ==
A peteca match is played to the best of the three games, singles or doubles. The first player (or the first pair) who scores twelve points wins the set. One game can last only a maximum of twenty minutes. If neither of the two sides have reached the required score, then the win is given to the team with the most points.

The peteca must be struck with one hand only and must pass above the net to the oppositions side in order for them to return it. The server remains the same one until the service changes side. A point can only be won by the serving team. The player with the service has thirty seconds to score the point. If this is not achieved then the service is given to the opposing player/team.

=== Faults ===
There are a number of recognised faults which can occur.

- Service fault: service passes to the opposing team if the peteca passes below the net, outside the limits of the court, if the peteca touches the net or if the peteca touches a player of the same team (double) before passing over to the opposing side.
- The 'in play' faults: if a player puts his hands or feet on the opposing teams side (similar to what occurs in a volleyball game); if a player touches the peteca with two hands; if there are marked accompaniment and not striking; if any other part of his/her body touches it and if the peteca is not hit (head, feet).
- The 30-second rule: the server or the team which is serving has 30 seconds to score the point. If the point is not scored in this period, then the service goes to the opposition. At the end of 20 seconds, the referee announces "10" as a warning of the time remaining. With the sounding of the referee's whistle, the rally is finished. This is a more strict rule, when there's a referee to open count.

== Equipment and court ==
- Shuttlecocks: There are two types of shuttlecocks used in two different kinds of games of peteca. In a regular peteca tournament, the shuttlecock has a flat base and a standard weight of 42 grams. The feathers are crimped and straight. In a mini-peteca game, the shuttlecock has a rounded rubber base attached to five or more rubber discs. The base is softer on the hand. Although designs vary, the most common petecas (especially the competition type) consist of a base in the shape of a filled leather bag or a layered rubber pad, and a flight, which is usually made out of feathers stuck to the base.
- Court: singles' games are played on courts 15 m x 5.5m. Doubles' games are played at 15 m x 7.5m. By comparison, a standard volleyball court is 18 m x 9m. Peteca is played on wood, cement or clay courts. Mini-peteca is played on a standard sized badminton court.
- Net: men's games are played using a rectangular net topping 2.43 m high, similar to a volleyball net. Women's games lower it to 2.24 m. Children (8-12yrs) play over a 2 m high net.
- Footwear: Sneakers with a firm grip to the floor are desirable.
- Lightweight gloves: beginners often find that the rubber base of the peteca is hard on the hands, usually leaving red spots and a stinging sensation on them. It is suggested that they wear a lightweight fingerless glove, similar to those used in rugby.

== Competition ==
Competitive court games have been played in Brazil since the early 1930s. It was only in 1973 that the first rules were written.

It was founded in 1985 and is now a played internationally. The aim of the game is to hit the shuttlecock like object

Currently, in Brazil, there's a Confederação Brasileira de Peteca, still incipient, being formed around the preexistent Federação Mineira de Peteca, from the state of Minas Gerais.

A version of peteca, indiaca, was developed by Karlhans Krohn in Germany in 1936 and is very popular. However, France was one of the first European countries to embrace peteca proper. The Federation Française de Peteca (FFP) is the national organ for France and was created in February 1997 by Jean-François Impinna, a French former international rugby player, and counts thousands of French peteca players.

The United Kingdom has recently followed suit and taken up the game with the United Kingdom Peteca Association - UKPA leading its development.

May 2006 would see the first International Peteca Tournament being hosted by the FFP in Sannois, Paris. Teams from Brazil, France and the United Kingdom were to compete.
