= Sipa =

Traditional sport in the Philippines

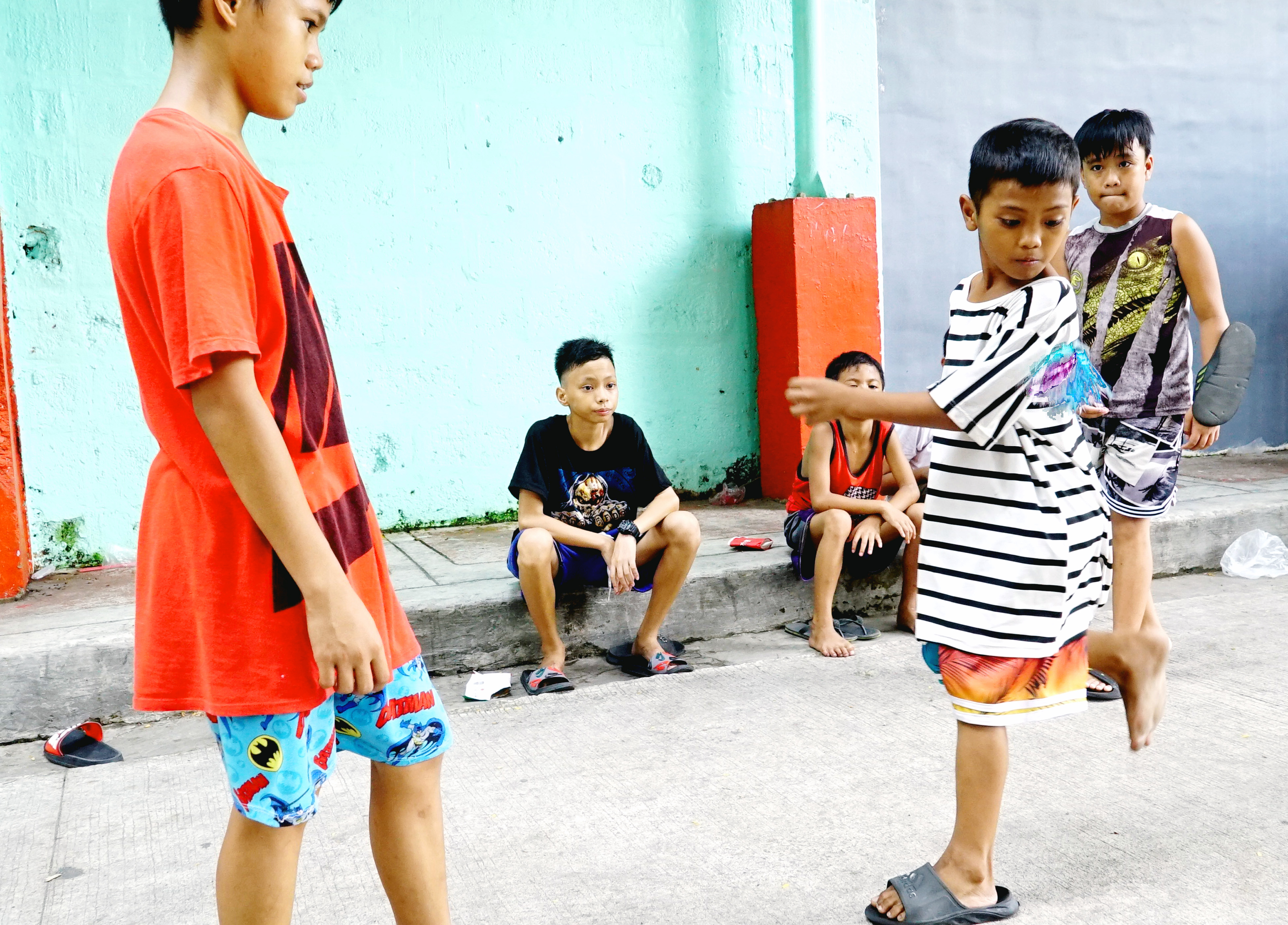
Children playing sipa with a lead washer in Tatalon, Quezon City.

Sipa (lit. 'kick') is the Philippines' traditional native sport which predates the Spanish rule. The game is related to Sepak Takraw. Similar games include Footbag net, Footvolley, Bossaball and Jianzi.

The game is both played by two teams, indoors or outdoors, on a court that is about the size of a basketball court. The teams consist of one, two or four players in each side. The aim of the game is to kick a soft ball made out of rattan fragments, back and forth over a net in the middle of the court. The sport requires speed, agility and ball control. A point is awarded every time a player kicks the ball, the more the player kicks the ball, the more the points accumulate. Rules attached to the game are very minimal and even children can play, but the ratan ball version is preferred more for formal games.

== Washer version ==
One version of Sipa uses a lead washer covered with cloth, which gets kicked. This version is played by both girls and boys, but girls tend to use the outside of their foot to manipulate the washer, while boys more often use the inside of the foot. Points are scored based on the number of kicks without the ball touching the ground. If the ball touches the ground one point is awarded to the opposing team.

== Rattan ball version ==
This version uses a larger rattan woven ball with the same foot action. Sipa balls, which look like Hacky Sack balls, can be purchased online.

Originally, the rattan Sipa ball was 10 centimeters in diameter and made of woven rattan strips with symmetrical holes. The most defining feature of the game of Sipa is that the ball should only be touched with the legs anywhere from below the knee to the tip of the toes. The rattan ball can touch the ground.

== Simplified play (one on one, two on two, three on three, or four on four) ==
A set of rules determines penalty points (such as the ball bouncing twice on the ground). The two teams play against each other until a set number of penalty points is reached by one of the teams.

There is also a court version in which a rectangle is marked in grids. Grids denote zones, and dictate where players stand, and how points are allotted based on where the ball lands in the court.

This game requires much coordination.

== Sources ==
- Lopez, Mellie Leandicho (1993). A study of Philippine games. Diliman, Quezon City: University of the Philippines Press. ISBN 971-542-295-0. OCLC 49892251.
- (2007) Escudero urges revival of national games. Retrieved 04/22/2007, from Inquirer Headlines
