= IFPA =

IFPA may refer to:

- International Federation of Placenta Associations
- International Fighter Pilots Academy
- International Fitness Professionals Association
- International Footbag Players' Association
- Irish Family Planning Association
- Federal Institute of Pará (Portuguese: Instituto Federal do Pará), a Brazilian educational institute
