= Tuček =

Tuček (feminine Tučková) is a Czech surname, it may refer to:

- Jaroslav Tuček, Bohemian fencer
- Petr Tuček (born 1979), Czech ice hockey goaltender
- Sarabeth Tucek, American singer and songwriter
- Tomas Tucek (born 1989), Czech world and European freestyle footbag champion
- Kateřina Tučková (born 1980), Czech novelist and curator
