= Mike Marshall =

Mike Marshall may refer to:

- Mike Marshall (outfielder) (born 1960), American Major League Baseball outfielder, 1981–1991
- Mike Marshall (pitcher) (1943–2021), American Major League Baseball pitcher, 1967–1981
- Mike Marshall (musician) (born 1957), American acoustic musician
- Mike Marshall (inventor) (died 1975), American inventor (Footbag, Wham-O)
- Mike Marshall (actor) (1944–2005), French-American actor
- Mike Marshall (rugby union) (1917–1945), English rugby union player
- Mike Marshall (racing driver) (born 1979), American stock car racing driver
- Michael Marshall (singer) (born 1965), American R&B singer
- Mike Marshall, British member of the German band Soultans

== See also ==
- Michael Marshall (disambiguation)
