= Freestyle footbag =

Freestyle Footbag is a footbag sport where players demonstrate their abilities by performing sequences of acrobatic tricks. The ending position of the bag on one trick becomes the starting position of the bag on the next trick. Tricks are created by combining different components between contacts (stalls or kicks, usually stalls). Components can be spins, dexterities (wrapping a leg around the bag in mid-air), or ducks (letting the bag pass a few inches above the neck). Contacts are usually on the inside of the foot behind the opposite support leg (clipper stall) or on the toe, however many inventive possibilities remain and are used to create a near-endless list of tricks.

== Competition Events ==
In competition, there are several different freestyle events.

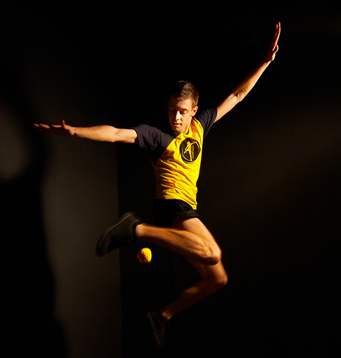
World freestyle footbag champion 2011, 2012 & 2013 in Singles routines, circle and request Jan Weber

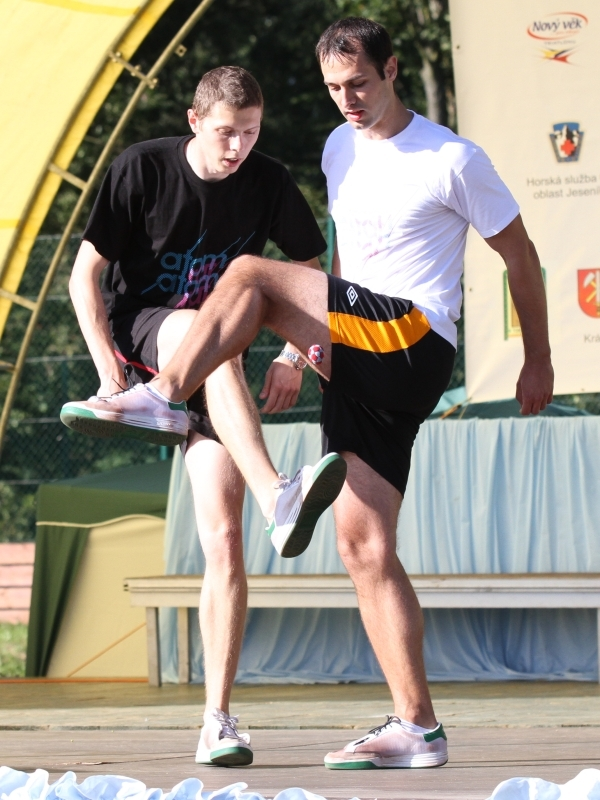
Multiple world and European Doubles routines champions and innovators of the discipline Martin Sladek and Tomas Tucek

=== Routines ===
In this event a player choreographs and executes a routine to music. Much like figure skating, players are given scores for technical and artistic merit. These scores take into account choreography, difficulty, variety, and execution. At the open level, singles routines are 2 minutes long, doubles routines 3 minutes; at the intermediate level and in women category, routines are 90 seconds.

=== 30 Second Shred ===
Or "Shred 30" is purely technical. Competitors have to execute as many unique, difficult tricks in a 30 second period as possible. Their score is calculated with a mathematical formula, which takes into account the average difficulty of the run, and penalizes the players for repeated moves. Dropping the bag lowers the player's score in 2 ways: it lowers their difficulty ratio, and decreases the number of tricks they can fit in 30 seconds. The formula is adds + adds*uniques/contacts.

=== Sick 3 ===
The objective of this event is for players to link three hard tricks together in the most impressive way possible. Players are usually given between 5-7 attempts to land a combo, within a maximum time frame of 2 minutes. This event is often judged by a panel of judges, who sometimes use videocameras to verify that moves were hit cleanly within the combo. Judging is purely subjective.

=== Sick Trick ===
In this competition, the most difficult assortment of components is put into one move and judged subjectively by difficulty, form, and cleanliness. Usually the competitor is given 3-7 tries which is at the competition director's discretion

=== Rippin' Run ===
In this competition, a minimum of two players start a guiltless string (a series of moves with a minimum requirement of 3 components (adds) in between contacts) and try to outlast each other. Players are eliminated and the winners progress to the next round, just like in the single-elimination tournament.

=== Circle Competition ===
Or "Circle Comp" or just "Circle" for short is relatively new compared to other events, Circle Comp was invented by Ianek Regimbald and Sebastien Duchesne of Montreal, Quebec, Canada, and Eliot Piltz of Vancouver, British Columbia, Canada, with input from several other competitive players. In Circle Comp, the total pool of competitors are divided into smaller pools (or Circles, giving the event its name, and also representing how freestyle footbag is typically played), usually of no more than 4 players. Each player in the circle takes a turn with the bag, until they drop. The bag is then passed to the next player, who takes their turn, and so forth. There is a limit to the number of times the bag will go around the circle. For instance, there may be three difficulty rounds followed by three variety rounds, though organizers of different events may revise the structure of the format in different ways. Players are evaluated subjectively by a panel of judges.

== Components (ADD Categories) ==
Tricks performed while playing freestyle are made up different add categories. ADD is an acronym for "Additional Degree of Difficulty". A toe stall would be a 1-ADD trick. TOE [DEL]. A "clipper" is a cross body inside delay CLIP [XBD][DEL] and is worth 2-ADDs. A cross-body sole delay XBD_SOLE [XBD][UNS][DEL] is worth 3-adds. The more adds, the more possible permutations there are for tricks. Moves have been performed up to 9-ADDs (Chilly-Philly Sauce). There are 5 ADD types

- Delay [del] This Add is awarded to any move in which you catch (stall/delay) the footbag on either your foot or part of your leg.
- DEXTERITY [dex] This Add is awarded when you circle around the footbag with your leg.
- UNUSUAL SURFACE [uns] You get this Add when you use any surface of the body besides the toes, insteps, outsteps and knees.
- BODY [bod] This ADD is awarded to any move which involves a spin, jump, or twist of your body.
- CROSS BODY [xbd] This ADD is awarded to any move which involves a kick or delay done on the opposite side of your body.

=== ADD classification ===
If you are a player who can successfully combine multiple ADD level tricks in one "String" or "session" than your playing difficulty can be classed as follows.

- 2 ADDs = Tiltless
- 3 ADDs = Guiltless
- 4 ADDs = Tripless
- 5 ADDs = Fearless
- 6 ADDs = Beastly
- 7 ADDs = Godly

== Freestyle trick fundamentals ==
=== Kicks ===
There are 3 fundamental kicks that are used in freestyle. These kicks are:

- Inside kick: Using the inside of your shoe.
- Outside kick: Using the outside of your shoe. The Outside kick is also known as the gimp kick, fairy kick and al-weez kick.
- Toe kick: Using the toe area of your shoe.

=== Stalls ===
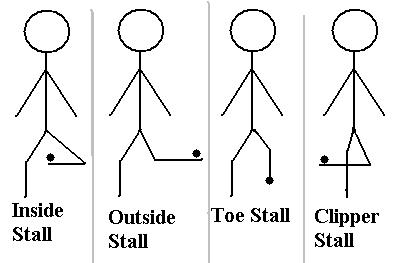
Types of stall

Once a player has mastered these tricks, they generally move on to stalling/delaying the footbag. This is where the footbag stops on part of the body. It is done to gain more control of the footbag, or to set up prior to a trick. Some of the simpler stalls found in freestyle are:

- Toe stall: This is usually the first stall learned in footbag. The footbag is kicked or dropped in front of the body, and caught on the toe.
- Inside stall: The footbag is caught on the inside of the foot.
- Outside stall: The footbag is caught on the outside of the foot.
- Clipper or Jester (Chester) stall: The kicking foot is positioned behind the standing foot, and caught on the inside of the foot as in an inside stall. the name jester is often used by circle kickers.

=== Basic Dexterities ===
- Around the World - Wrapping the leg around the bag in between toe stalls on same foot.
- Switch - From toe stall to opposite toe stall, the leg goes out to in over the bag and catches the bag on the toe of the leg that circles the bag.
- Pickup - From toe stall to opposite toe stall, the leg goes in to out under the bag and catches the bag on the toe of the leg that circles the bag.
- Mirage - From toe stall back to the same toe, on the way down the opposite leg goes from in to out under the bag and catches the bag on the toe of the leg that does not circle the bag.
- Down - On the way down, let the bag fall in between the legs while moving a leg from outside to in, letting it be caught on the opposite legs clipper stall (inside stall behind opposite support leg). This may be the most important move in footbag. It lays the foundation for more difficult moves.

=== Other Components ===
- Spins
- Ducks
- Symposium
- Kneeing

=== Combining Concepts ===
Spins can be added to dexterities to create moves like spinning down.

=== Acronyms and Jargon ===
Here is a list of various terms and concepts, these do not include actual trick names.

- Alpine - A move that adds a duck, dive or weave between two dexterities
- Backside - A move in which the downtime component is symposium
- BS - Both Sides. Usually refers to hitting a move on both sides. Also sometimes used to denote Backside (see term)
- BSOR - Both Sides One Run. Alternative way of saying BSOS (below)
- BSOS - Both Sides One String. Refers to hitting a trick on both sides in one string.
- Frontside - A move in which the uptime component is symposium
- FS - Frontside (see term)
- PDX - Short for Paradox
- PS - Paradox-Symposium. A move that is both paradox AND symposium
- The - Leg dexterities that do not fully circle the bags. 'The' dexterities do not count for adds
- Thin - A move that was not hit cleanly but still technically hit.

== IFPA World Footbag Freestyle Championships 2017 results ==
Open Singles Routines

1. Pawel Nowak (Poland)
2. Vaclav Klouda (Czech Republic)
3. Taishi Ishida (Japan)

Women's Singles Routines

1. Paloma Mayo (Spain)
2. Cassandra Taylor (Canada)
3. Caroline Birch (Australia)
