= Jim Flattery =

Australian rugby league player (1898–1969)

Jim Flattery OBE
Personal information
- Full name: James Martin Flattery
- Born: 2 November 1898 Paddington, New South Wales, Australia
- Died: 24 April 1969 (aged 70) Sydney, New South Wales, Australia

Playing information
- Position: Centre, Wing
Club
Years	Team	Pld	T	G	FG	P
1920–25	University	45	15	0	0	45
Representative
Years	Team	Pld	T	G	FG	P
1921–22	New South Wales	3	6	0	0	18

James Martin Flattery (2 November 1898 – 24 April 1969) was an Australian rugby league player of the 1920s and later a Surgeon Captain in the Royal Australian Navy.

Flattery was born in the Sydney suburb of Paddington, where he attended the local Brother's school, before receiving a government bursary to Waverley College in 1913. He was the college captain, rugby union team captain and school dux (1916) at Waverley College. For his tertiary studies, Flattery pursued a medical degree at the University of Sydney, attending St John's College on a Catholic Secondary Schools' Scholarship.

A sturdy three–quarter, Flattery was capped for the NSW Second XV in rugby union and competed in the NSWRFL for the Sydney University RLFC during his studies, including for their inaugural season in 1920. He became University's first interstate representative when he appeared twice for New South Wales in 1921, notably scoring four tries in a 34–20 win over Queensland at Davies Park in Brisbane. In addition to rugby, Flattery was a competitive (Australian) handball player, for which he won back to back national titles.

Flattery served as a medical officer at Sydney Hospital after graduating and in 1923 enlisted in the Royal Australian Navy. In World War II Flattery served as a Squadron Medical Officer on HMAS Australia and was mentioned in despatches for his actions during the invasion of Lingayen Gulf in the Philippines. In 1955 Flattery was named an honorary physician to the Queen. He retired from the Navy in 1958.
