= International Footbag Players' Association =

International governing body for the sport of footbag

The International Footbag Players' Association, Inc. (IFPA) is a U.S. 501(c)(3) non-profit corporation that serves as the international governing body for the sport of footbag. IFPA as a corporation has existed since 1994, though its name changed in 2000 from World-Wide Footbag Foundation, Inc. (its originally incorporated name as a California non-profit corporation).

IFPA is an all-volunteer organization made up of players and organizers from countries all around the world. Among other things, IFPA is the rules body and the sanctioning body for competitive footbag sports. IFPA oversees the World Footbag Championships as they move from city to city each year, and hosts the Footbag WorldWide Information Service. IFPA's website provides official IFPA members with a video hosting service, a club listing service, mailing lists, a forum, a media gallery, an online rule book, an event calendar, and many other services. Many of IFPA's services on its website are offered in multiple languages.

== History of IFPA ==
Footbag was invented in 1972 in Oregon City, Oregon, by John Stalberger and Mike Marshall. In 1979, Stalberger and Ted Huff formed the National Hacky Sack Association (NHSA) which became the first official organizing body for the sport. The NHSA sanctioned and/or sponsored footbag tournaments in the U.S., including the "Footbag Nationals" which evolved into the World Footbag Championships, an event that it has been running annually since 1980.

In 1984, the NHSA ceased to exist, and the World Footbag Association (WFA) was formed in Golden, Colorado, by Bruce Guettich and Greg Cortopassi. The WFA started as a governing body, but soon evolved into a touring team, magazine publisher, and footbag product retailer (via a mail-order catalog business). WFA formed the International Footbag Advisory Board (IFAB) to oversee the official Rules of Footbag Sports (the printed rule-book for the sport of footbag). WFA also took on the task of running the World Footbag Championships from 1984 through 1993.

The World-Wide Footbag Foundation, Inc., was incorporated as a California non-profit corporation for public benefit in 1994 by Steve Goldberg, Julie Symons, Brent Welch, and David Butcher. That year, WWFF became the official host of the World Footbag Championships which moved from Colorado to San Francisco and Menlo Park, California. From then on, the World Footbag Championships began moving from city to city as the official WWFF sanctioning process was put in place to provide a set of selection criteria and to decide which host city would be accepted each year. Also in 1994, the WWFF created and began hosting the Footbag WorldWide Information Service.

The IFAB continued under the auspices of the WFA for several years, and WFA continued to serve as the official sanctioning body for footbag events during that time.

In 2000, the WWFF changed its name to the International Footbag Players' Association, Inc. (IFPA) to better reflect its mission as a player-run volunteer organization and international governing body for the sport of footbag. At that time, the IFAB (which had been the rules body for the sport) reincorporated as a committee of the IFPA and was renamed the International Footbag Committee (IFC). The IFC took over responsibility for defining requirements for IFPA sanctioning and recognition of official footbag competition formats. An IFC rule book is available in several languages.

IFPA was granted provisional 501(c)(3) status by the U.S. Internal Revenue Service in early 2001, and was granted permanent charitable status under 501(c)(3) as a sports organization in early 2006.

== IFPA's mission ==
IFPA's mission is to promote footbag as a healthy, athletic activity, by fostering footbag competitions, clubs, festivals, and education around the globe. In addition to overseeing the World Footbag Championships from year to year, IFPA continues to run its web-based resource for footbag players and aficionados worldwide at footbag.org.
