= Michael Marshall =

Michael Marshall may refer to:

- Michael Marshall (bishop) (born 1936), Bishop of Woolwich
- Sir Michael Marshall (politician) (1930–2006), British politician
- Michael Marshall (singer) (born 1965), American R&B singer
- Michael Marshall (skeptic) (born 1983), British skeptical activist
- Michael Marshall, pen name of Michael Marshall Smith (born 1965), British writer
- Michael Marshall, Melbourne gangland war victim, see Carl Williams

== See also ==
- Mike Marshall (disambiguation)
