= Hack Slap =

Ball game

Hack slap is a game that utilises a footbag or 'Hacky Sack'. The game is similar to the Australian handball rules.

The object is to keep the 'footbag' in the air by any means necessary, excluding hands. When someone fails to keep the footbag in the air, hit it with an upward trajectory, or the 'footbag' fails to make it to an opponents square, they are eliminated.

== Common rules ==
Once the game is down to the final four competitors, the 'King' or server can opt to play semi finals, or 'Head to Head'. In this method of play, square 1 versus square 4 in a first to 3, while square 2 plays square 3. The winners of these match ups then play off in a Grand Final to determine the winner, which is also a first to 3 contest. In a first to 3 contest, the higher ranked player (e.g. King is higher than Dunce) serves. Similar to tennis, when a player wins a rally, they receive a point. Thus, first to 3 simply means, the first player to win 3 rallies.

The other method of play when the game is down to the final four competitors is referred to a 'Normals' or 'Fatal Four Way'. When two of the people in the last four are eliminated, the Grand Final is played between the final two. These two competitors then play off in a first to 3 grand final.

The game also operates on a two touch basis, where the competitors may only touch the 'footbag' a maximum of two times. For instance, the 'footbag' may come into contact with a competitor's chest, however the competitor still has one more chance to dispose of it to another competitor's square providing the 'footbag' doesn't make contact with the ground.

== Elimination wins ==
Elimination wins are then tallied and the person with the most wins after a certain period of time is crowned 'champion'. One important rule when the elimination tally is taken into consideration, is that an elimination can not be held unless there is a minimum of 4 competitors.

== See also ==
- Four square
