= Ken Shults =

American footbag (hacky sack) player

Kenny "The Enforcer" Shults
Personal information
- Nickname: The Enforcer
- Nationality: American

Sport
- Sport: Footbag
- Events: Freestyle, Net, Consecutive
- Club: Sole Purpose Footbag Group

Kenny Shults is an American footbag (hacky sack) player and multiple-time world champion. He is widely regarded as one of the most influential athletes in the history of the sport, known for his competitive dominance, technical innovation, and contributions to footbag's judging and instructional systems.

On May 20, 2026 Kenny was a featured guest on Good Morning America and referred to as a hall of famer invited to discuss his thoughts on the hacky sack craze making a comeback for Gen Z more than 50 years after its debut, thanks in part to TikTok.

== Early life ==
Shults began playing footbag in 1977 in Oregon, where the sport first emerged. He gained attention at a young age for his skill and creativity. A 1996 Sports Illustrated profile described him as one of the most accomplished athletes in the sport's history. Shults graduated from the University of Oregon in 1988 with a degree in advertising.

== Competitive career ==
=== World championships and titles ===
Shults has won multiple world championships in freestyle, doubles freestyle, footbag net, doubles net, and consecutive kicks. According to the International Footbag Players Association, he has earned 18 world titles in footbag net—eight in singles and ten in doubles. His competitive career spans from the late 1970s through the 2000s.

Shults competed in his first world championships in 1980 in Oregon City and has played in roughly 25 since. He won the singles net title eight times between 1982 and 1992, then won again in 2025 in France — his first world title in net footbag in 33 years.

In 2025 Kenny Shults won Gold in Open Singles Net at the 44th IFPA World Footbag Championship in Nantes, France.

In 2026 Kenny defended his title and once again won Gold in Open Singles Net at the 45th IFPA World Footbag Championship in Tsukuba, Japan.

=== Technical innovation and contributions ===
Shults co-developed the ADD system, the difficulty-rating method used in modern freestyle footbag. He has invented and named numerous advanced maneuvers, including the trick known as "Big Apple Sauce". His work helped refine core elements of freestyle play such as stalls, dexterities, and linking concepts.

=== Media, teaching, and community involvement ===
Shults created the instructional videos Tricks of the Trade and Tricks of the Trade 2
