= Tomas Tucek =

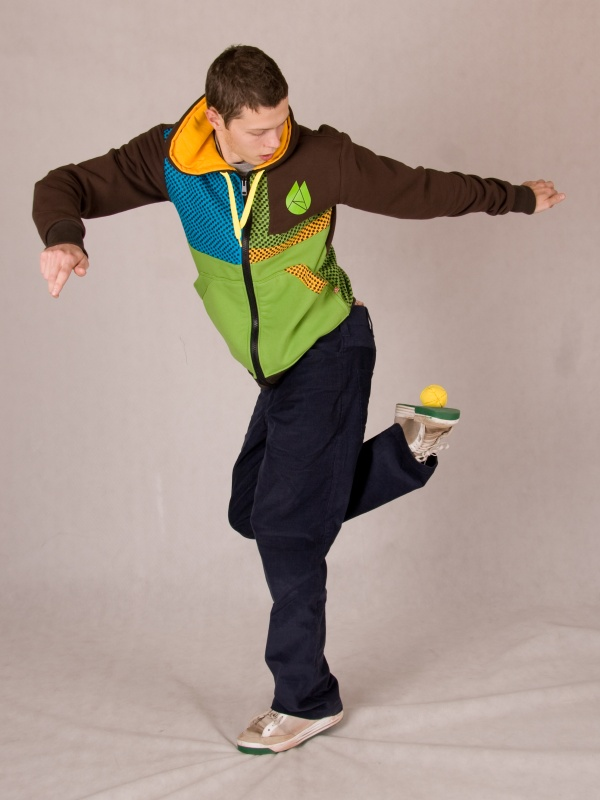

Personal information
- Born: 13 December 1987 (age 38) Hradec Králové, Czechoslovakia
- Height: 1.87 m (6 ft 2 in)
- Website: www.uniquetrio.com, www.footbagshow.cz

Sport
- Country: Czech Republic
- Sport: Footbag
Medal record
Representing Czech Republic
Men's Footbag
IFPA World Footbag Championships
Gold medal – first place	2015 Copenhagen	doubles
Gold medal – first place	2014 Paris	doubles
Gold medal – first place	2011 Helsinki	doubles
Gold medal – first place	2009 Berlin	doubles
Gold medal – first place	2009 Berlin	Doubles circle contest
European Footbag Championships
Gold medal – first place	2012 Aachen	doubles
Gold medal – first place	2010 Brussels	doubles
Gold medal – first place	2009 Strzelin	doubles

Tomas Tucek (born December 13, 1987) is multiple world champion and European freestyle footbag champion. He has won world footbag championships in doubles discipline in 2009 and 2011 with his team-mate Martin Sladek. In 2009 they won in 2 disciplines: the main one (Open doubles freestyle) and Doubles circle contest. In 2008 they won the 1st place in 2008-The most successful sportsman of Kralovehradecky region in Special sport performance category. In summer 2012 Tomas Tucek and Martin Sladek started to perform with one of the best hand-and-foot jugglers in the world Stefan Siegert from Germany. This exhibition team is called UniqueTrio.

== Doubles discipline ==
Open doubles freestyle is one of the main disciplines in the sport of footbag. Competitors perform 3 minutes long routine to any music of their choice. The scoring of performances is quite similar to the scoring of figure skating. There are 6 judges giving their marks for technical and artistic level of the performance. The technical mark includes mainly difficulty, variety and execution of performed tricks. The artistic mark includes mainly choreography, "communication" with spectators and originality. Both marks are strongly influenced by the number of mistakes - fallings of player's bag to the ground. These mistakes are called drops. All marks are transformed into ranks (the highest mark means rank 1 etc.). The competitors with the lowest sum of ranks win.

Tomas Tucek and Martin Sladek are innovators of the discipline. They have invented several of new tricks and have been showing some of these in their competing routines. Some of these tricks have never been performed by other competitors and few of them haven't even been executed by others.
