= Jan Weber =

Czech sportsman

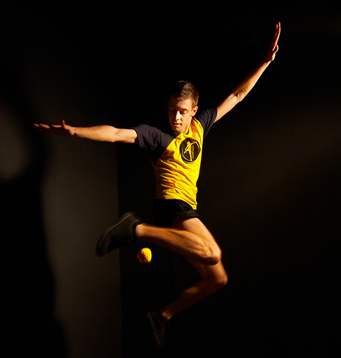
- Jan Weber – Freestyle footbag

Personal information
- Born: 28 August 1986 (age 40) Czechoslovakia
- Height: 1.86 m (6 ft 1 in)
- Website: www.honzaweber.com

Sport
- Country: Czech Republic
- Sport: Footbag and Freestyle football
Medal record
Representing Czech Republic
Men's Footbag
IFPA World Footbag Championships
Gold medal – first place	2021 online	singles
Gold medal – first place	2020 online	singles
Gold medal – first place	2013 Montreal	singles
Gold medal – first place	2012 Warsaw	singles
Gold medal – first place	2011 Helsinki	singles
Gold medal – first place	2008 Prague	doubles
Gold medal – first place	2007 Orlando	doubles
Gold medal – first place	2005 Helsinki	doubles
Gold medal – first place	2004 Montreal	doubles
Silver medal – second place	2006 Frankfurt	singles
Silver medal – second place	2005 Helsinki	singles
Silver medal – second place	2004 Montreal	singles
Bronze medal – third place	2009 Berlin	singles
European Footbag Championships
Gold medal – first place	2012 Aachen	singles
Gold medal – first place	2010 Brussels	singles
Gold medal – first place	2008 Montpellier	doubles
Gold medal – first place	2005 Wroclaw	doubles
Gold medal – first place	2004 Copenhagen	doubles
Silver medal – second place	2007 Vienna	singles
Silver medal – second place	2005 Wroclav	singles
Silver medal – second place	2004 Copenhagen	singles
Silver medal – second place	2003 Frankfurt	singles
Silver medal – second place	2002 Budapest	singles
Bronze medal – third place	2008 Montpellier	singles

Jan Weber (also known as Honza Weber, born 28 August 1986) is multiple World and European Freestyle footbag champion. He has been playing footbag since 2001 and since 2002 competed at more than 200 professional footbag events and performed at more than 2000 public events. He had gained his master's degree at the University of Economics, Prague and later became a professional freestyler. The biggest successes Weber achieved are 4 World Champion titles in doubles Freestyle footbag and 5 World Champion titles in singles discipline, 3 in a row in years 2011, 2012 and 2013. After that Weber stopped competing and was primarily focusing on live shows and footbag promotion. However, in 2020 he returned after 7 years for an online World championships, where he gained his 8th World Champion title and remained unbeaten also in 2021 when he added his last WC online title.

Weber has also started to play Freestyle football in 2010. He was a member of the organising crew of the first annual European Freestyle football in 2010 and first annual World Freestyle football championships in 2011 and 2012, all in Prague. He finished 5th at both World Championships in one of the events called Sick3. He won the Sick3 event at 2012 Czech Freestyle football championship and won the Czech Cup in 2013 and 2015.

In 2010 he took part in Czech TV talent show called "Talentmania", where he managed to advance into the semifinals and perform a flawless routine there. A year later he entered another Czech Got Talent show with his Freestyle footbag doubles partner. They impressed the jury members and also managed to advance further in the competition. In 2012, he again entered the TV show with his freestyle team called "Freestyle Union". In September 2011 Weber won the first annual Czech and Slovak Skittling championships. Later in 2011 he also won The Prague University talent show with his Freestyle Union team (footbag, yo-yo, Freestyle frisbee and Freestyle football). The finals of the show took place in the Lucerna Palace in the centre of Prague with more than 5000 spectators. In 2010 Honza (a version of Weber's Czech name Jan and his international nickname) met one of his heroes Tony Hawk. Honza performed in Hollywood at Tony Hawk's charity event "Stand up for Skateparks". Most of Honza's charity activities are connected with the Czech UNICEF organisation.

Honza also holds more than 20 Czech and World freestyle records. His most famous World record is controlling the football into juggles after the ball was dropped from a helicopter from 60 meters height. It later became a TV commercial for EURO2020. In 2014 he became a face for the autumn TIKI-TAKA campaign of Cruyff Classics, the sports clothing brand named after the famous Dutch football player Johan Cruyff. In 2015 he was featured in the Nissan "Truckerball" commercial for The UEFA Champions League.

== Top4Football TV ==
Honza's football skills are visible through his online series called Top4Football TV, where he tests the latest products with famous football players such as Petr Čech, Tomáš Rosický or Pavel Nedvěd, who also invited him for a guidance in Italian Juventus. There Honza also shot an episode with Bosnian star Miralem Pjanić.

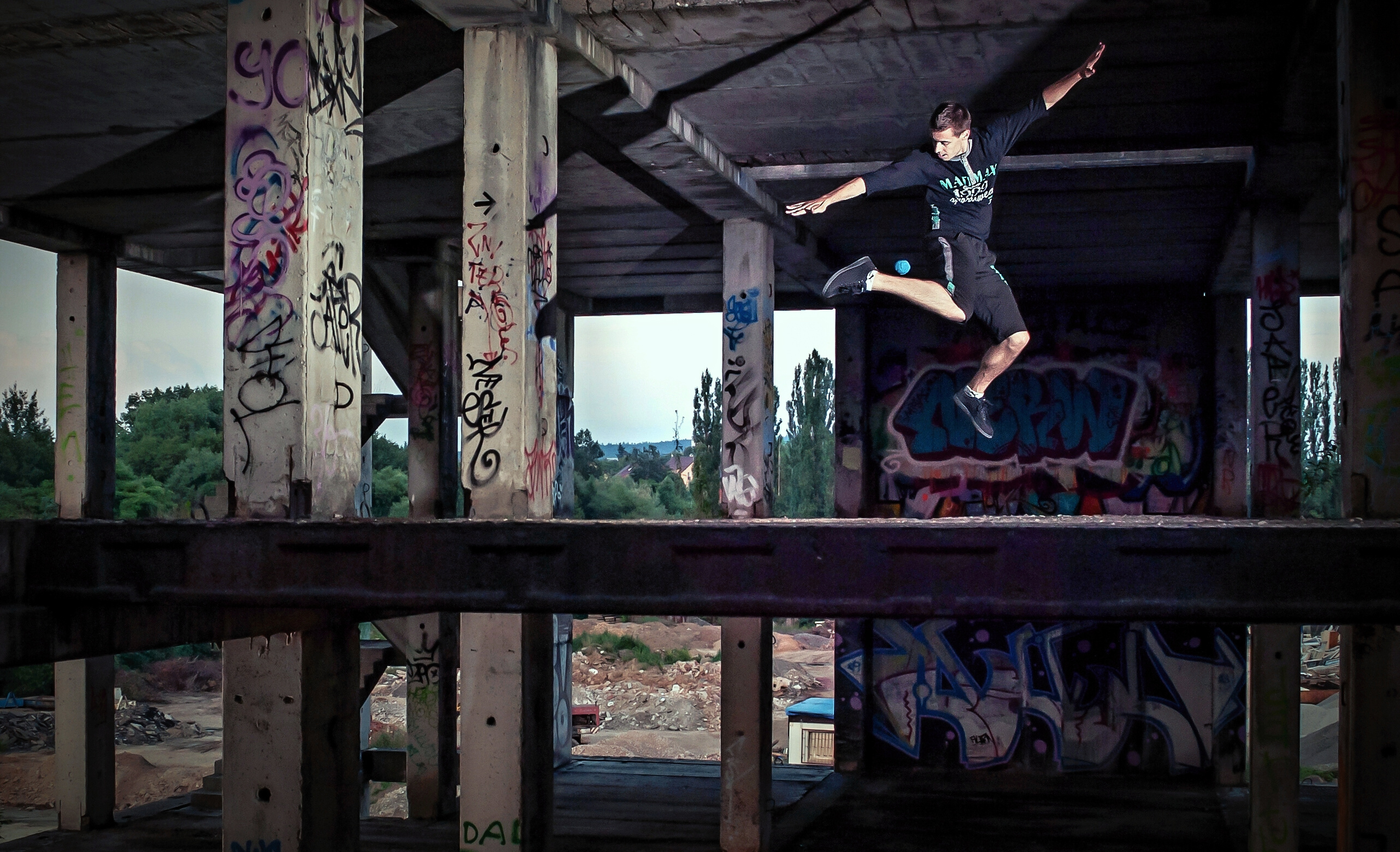
Jan Weber Footbag photoshoot

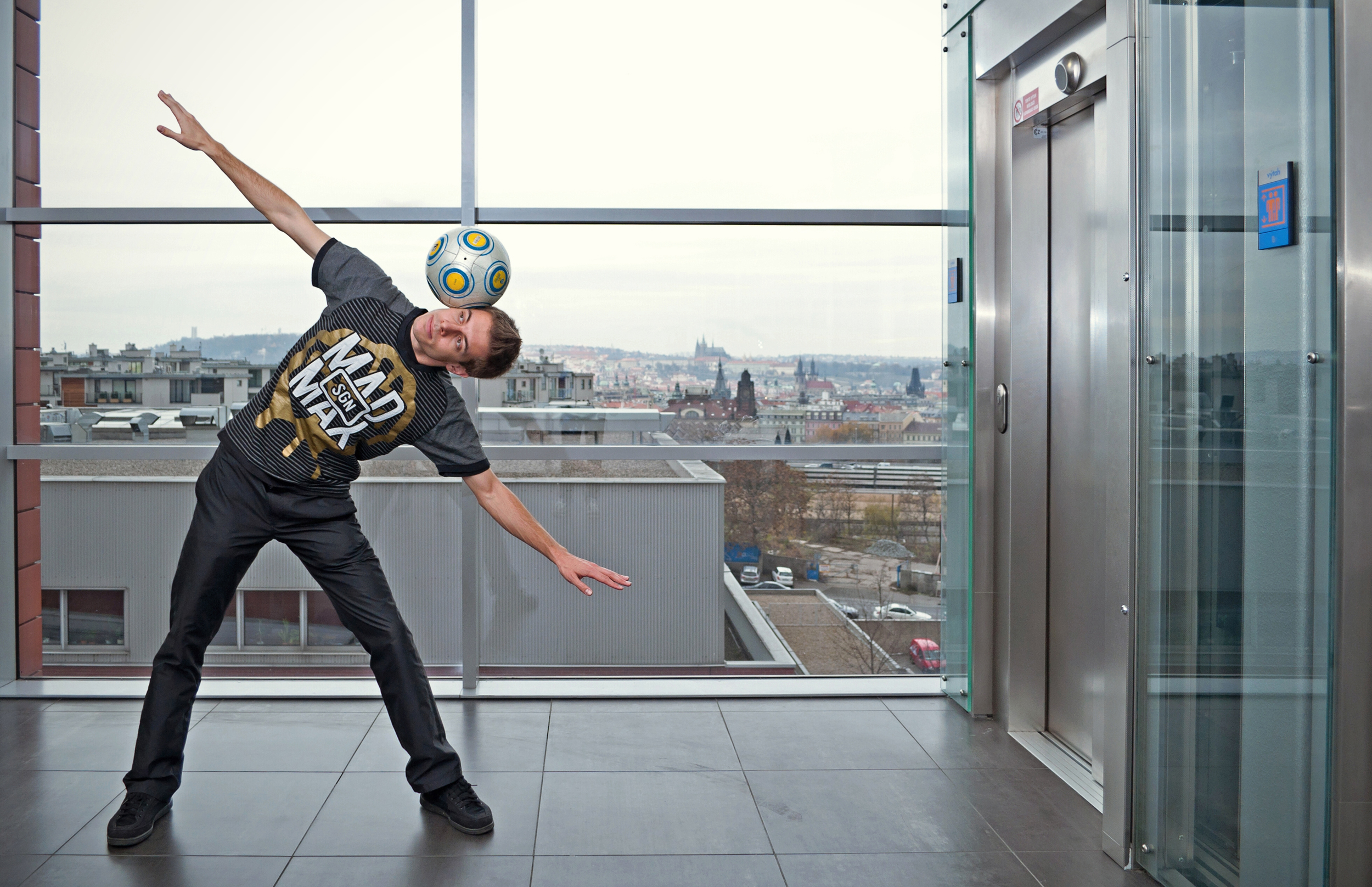
Jan Weber and Freestyle football balance

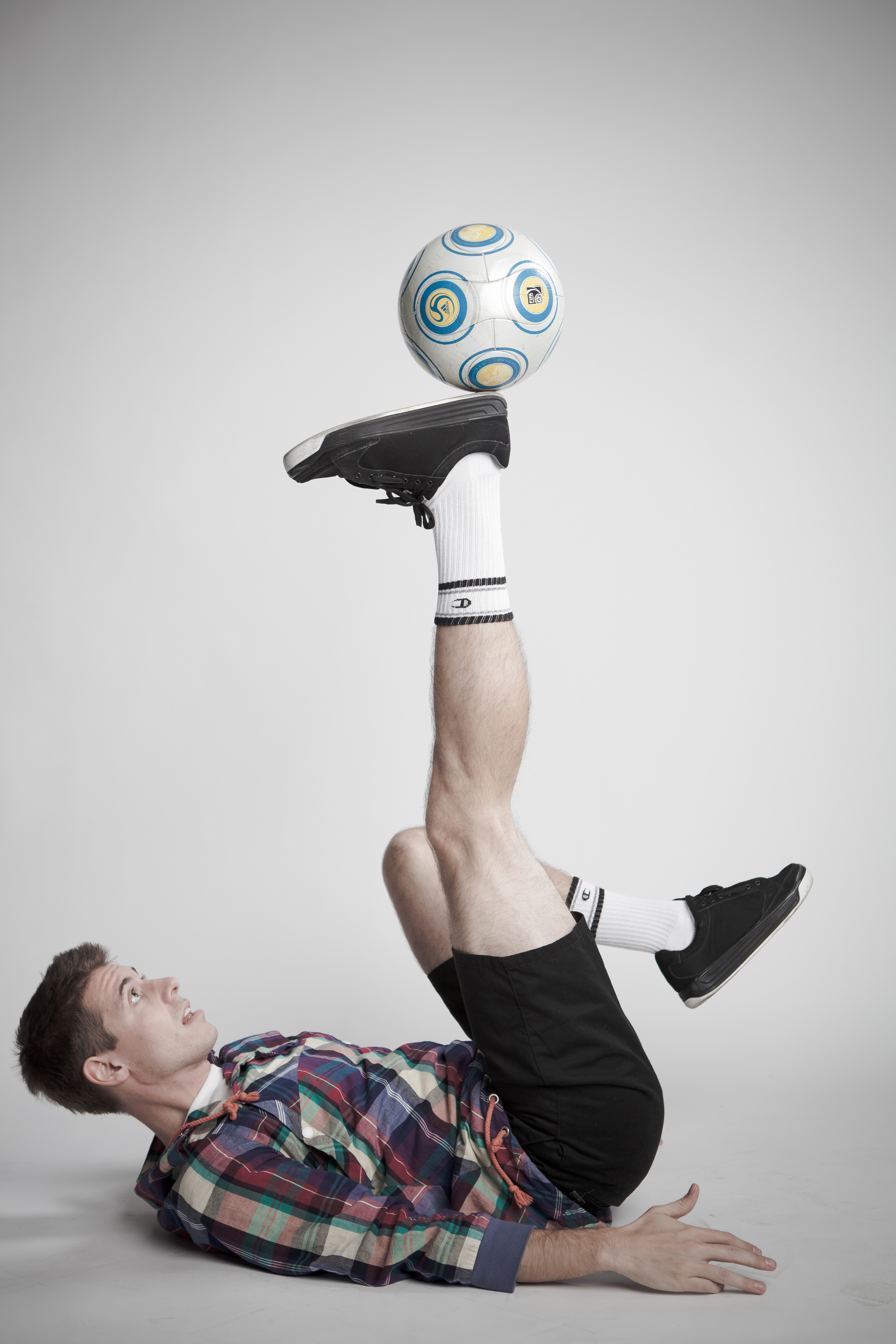
Jan Weber during a photoshoot for Czech magazine

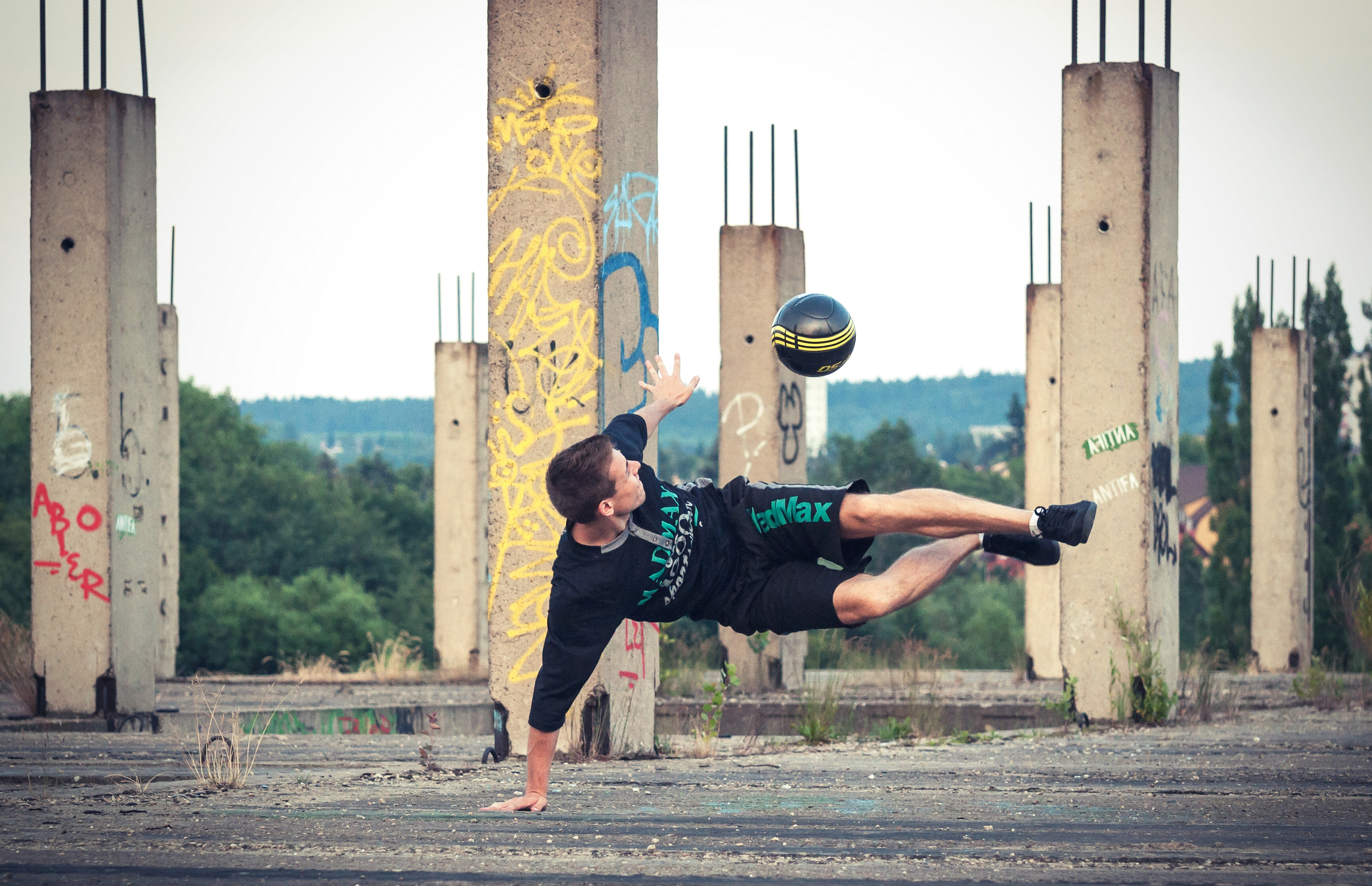
Jan Weber during Freestyle Soccer airmove

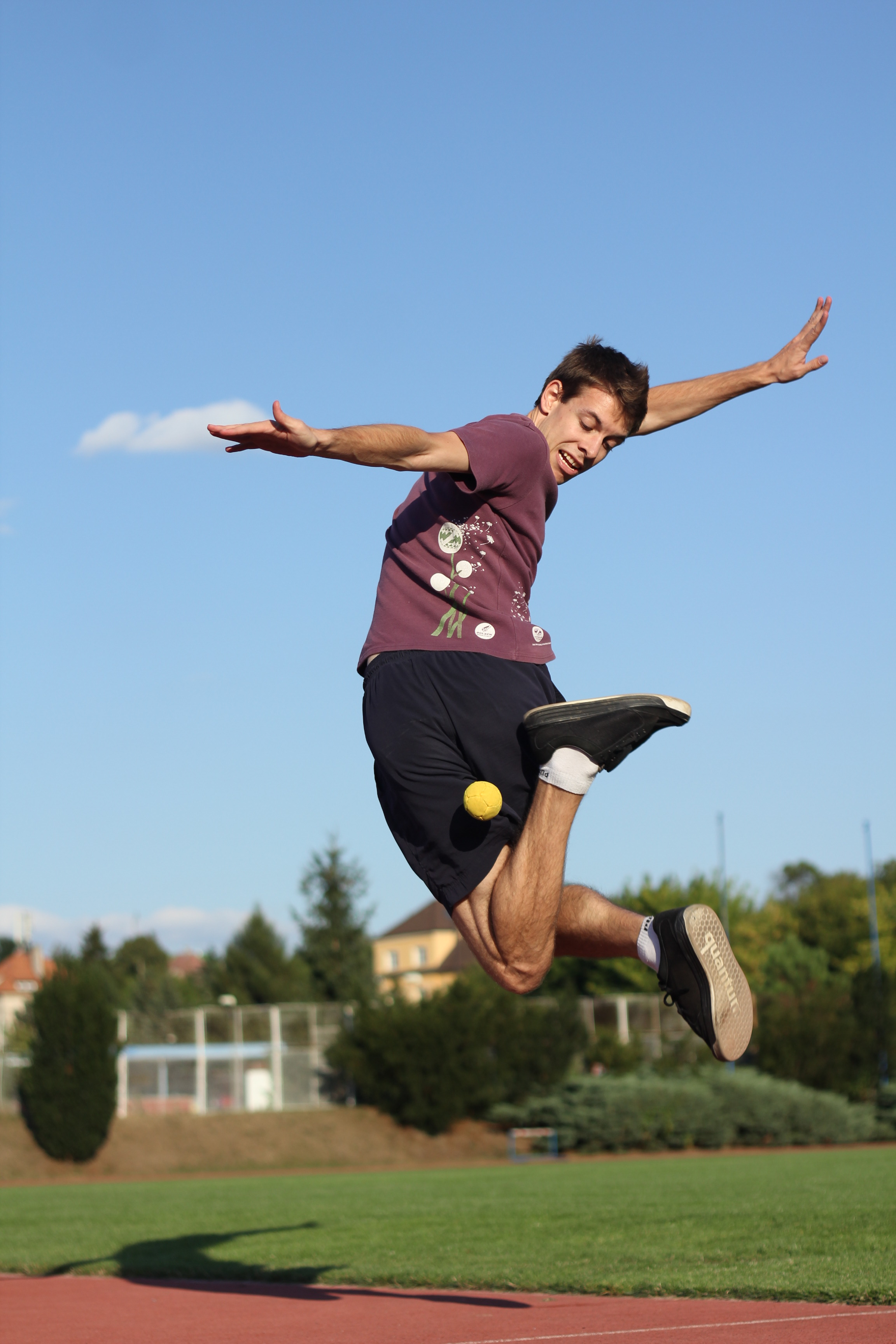
World Footbag Champion 2011 & 2012 - Honza Weber

== Awards and titles ==
=== 2021 ===
- World championships (online), shred-off – 1st place

=== 2020 ===
- World championships (online), singles – 1st place

=== 2016 ===
- World championships, request – 1st place
- Czech championships, singles – 1st place

=== 2015 ===
- Czech cup Freestyle football – 1st place

=== 2014 ===
- Czech championships, singles – 1st place

=== 2013 ===
- World championships, singles – 1st place
- World championships, circle – 1st place
- World championships, request – 1st place

=== 2012 ===
- World championships, singles – 1st place
- European championships, singles – 1st place

=== 2011 ===
- World championships, singles – 1st place
- World championships, shred 30 – 1st place

=== 2010 ===
- Czech championships, singles – 1st place
- European championships, singles – 1st place

=== 2009 ===
- World championships, singles – 3rd place
- Czech championships, singles – 1st place
- Czech championships, shred 30 – 1st place

=== 2008 ===
- European championships, singles – 3rd place
- European championships, shred 30 – 1st place
- European championships, doubles – 1st place
- European championships, circle – 1st place
- World championships, singles – 4th place
- World championships, doubles – 1st place
- Czech championships, singles – 1st place
- Czech championships, shred 30 – 1st place

=== 2007 ===
- European championships, singles – 2nd place
- European championships, shred 30 – 2nd place
- World championships, doubles – 1st place
- World championships, shred 30 – 4th place
- Czech championships, singles – 1st place
- Czech championships, shred 30 – 1st place

=== 2006 ===
- World championships, singles – 2nd place
- World championships, shred 30 – 2nd place
- Czech championships, singles – 2nd place
- Czech championships, shred 30 – 2nd place
- Czech championships, doubles – 1st place

=== 2005 ===
- European championships, singles – 2nd place
- European championships, shred 30 – 2nd place
- European championships, doubles – 1st place
- World championships, singles – 2nd place
- World championships, shred 30 – 2nd place
- World championships, doubles – 1st place
- Czech championships, singles – 2nd place
- Czech championships, shred 30 – 2nd place
- Czech championships, doubles – 1st place

=== 2004 ===
- European championships, singles – 2nd place
- European championships, shred 30 – 1st place
- European championships, doubles – 1st place
- World championships, singles – 2nd place
- World championships, shred 30 – 2nd place
- World championships, doubles – 1st place
- Czech championships, singles – 2nd place
- Czech championships, shred 30 – 2nd place
- Czech championships, doubles – 1st place

=== 2003 ===
- European championships, singles – 2nd place
- European championships, shred 30 – 2nd place
- World championships, singles – 4th place
- Czech championships, shred 30 – 2nd place
- Czech championships, doubles – 1st place

=== 2002 ===
- European championships, singles – 2nd place
- Czech championships, singles – 2nd place
- Czech championships, shred 30 – 2nd place
- Czech championships, doubles – 3rd place
