= Basse (game) =

Norwegian bag ball game

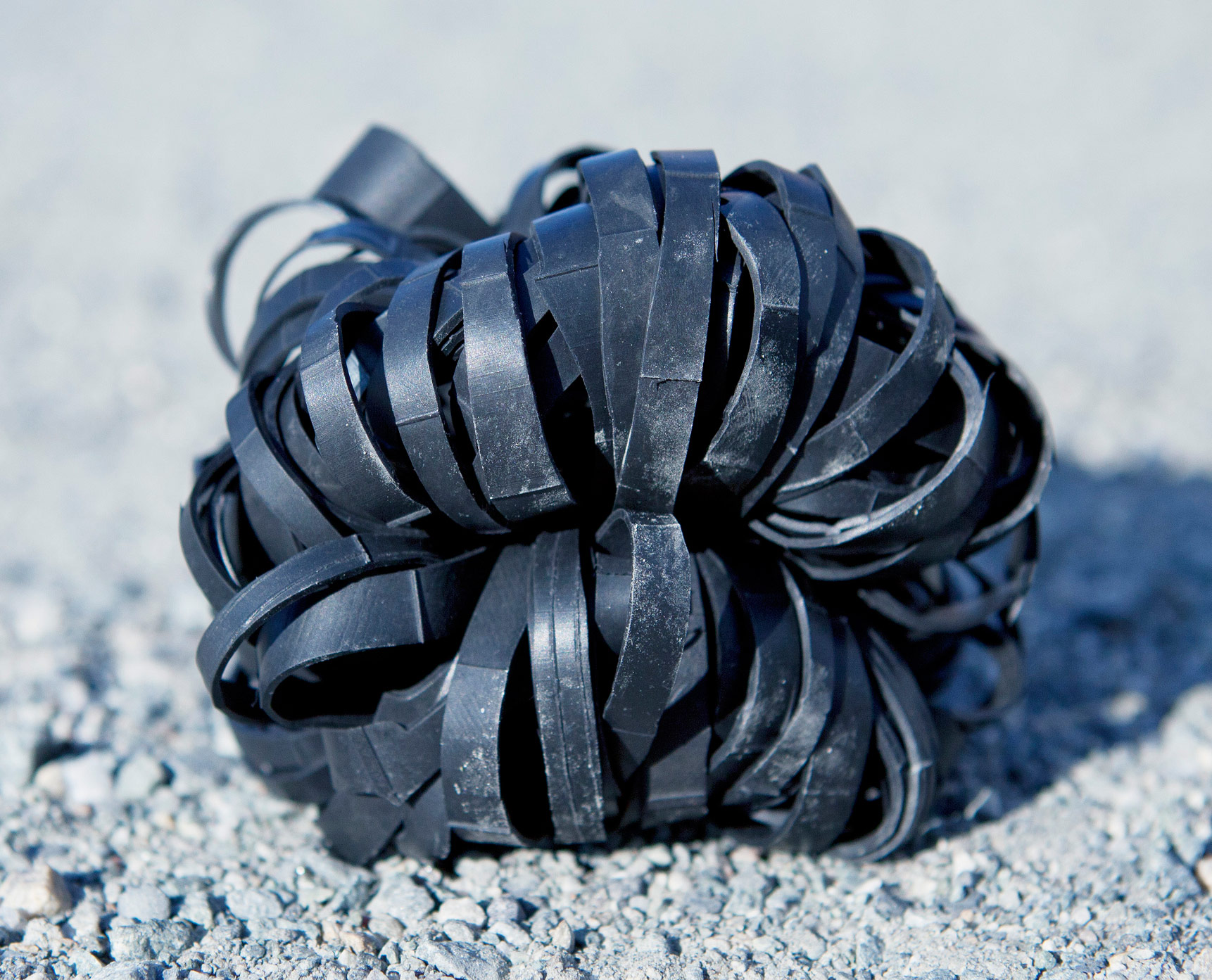
A basse, made of cut bicycle rubber tubes, tied together into a ball. Photo: Lars Haugdal Andersen / www.basse.no

Basse is a Norwegian ball game, with roots before World War I. Today basse is mostly played in the county of Trøndelag in Norway, but has also spread to other countries.

== Construction ==
The basse is similar to a bag ball although it's not really a bag. The basse is made with several rubber rings tied together to a round ball with a tight core. Use an old bicycle inner tube or rubber bands. It should be as round as possible, and not bounce in any direction when you hit it. The weight is about 70 – 100 grams.

== Gameplay ==
Create fields (typically circles that are referred to as "ruter", or squares) on any surface (gravel, tarmac, grass or indoors). Use your feet, chalk or spray paint to create the field, depending on the surface. First, draw the mid field circle. Diameter 1–1,5 metre. Make room, 30–40 cm between the next circles. You can have 4 to 8 fields around the center circle. The optimal number of players are 5–7, but 8–9 can play a game of basse, depending on the field and space available.

The overall goal is to defend your field (a circle) and to score goals on the other players. It is an individual sport and everyone plays against everyone. The game starts with a serve (not lower than the knee). If you concede a goal (i.e. the basse must land completely inside the circle and not touch the edge), you get one minus point. After 3 minus points you are out of the game. You must defend your circle and the players can hit the basse with all body limbs, except arms and hands.

The finale is played when there are two players left. ”The first goal wins”, regardless of the number of minus points each finalists has received before.

Some players practice rules for refereeing, dead squares, handball and penalty kicks. Basse tournaments are often held during the summer season.

== See also ==
- Footbag
