= Petr Tuček =

Czech ice hockey goaltender

- Born: January 26, 1979 (age 46)
- Height: 5 ft 9 in (175 cm)
- Weight: 165 lb (75 kg; 11 st 11 lb)
- Position: Goaltender
- Caught: Right
- Played for: HC Zlín; HK 36 Skalica; HC Znojemští Orli; Drakkars de Caen
- Playing career: 1997–2012

Petr Tuček (born January 26, 1979) is a Czech former professional ice hockey goaltender.

Tuček played 74 games in the Czech Extraliga for HC Zlín and HC Znojemští Orli. He also played in the Slovak Extraliga for HK 36 Skalica from 2004 to 2006 and in the Ligue Magnus for Drakkars de Caen during the 2007–08 season.
