= International Fitness Professionals Association =

The International Fitness Professionals Association (IFPA) is a certifying body for personal trainers and fitness professionals worldwide.

The IFPA was founded by Dr. James Bell in 1994. Besides the Personal Trainer Certification, the IFPA has sports nutrition certification, special populations Certification, military specialist certification and group fitness instructor certification. It has over 70 different Certifications and Continuing Education Courses (such as Open Water Swimming).

The IFPA requires individuals to take a proctored exam. Once the individual passes, they are officially an IFPA certified trainer.

The IFPA requires their trainers to renew their certification every two years. The IFPA allows trainers to renew by taking another certification, CEUs, fitbits, outside sources or fitness events.
