= Placenta (journal) =

- Discipline: Obstetrics, gynecology
- Language: English
- Edited by: M. Knöfler, G. Mor, A. Perkins, Y.-L. Wang

Publication details
- History: 1980–present
- Publisher: Elsevier
- Frequency: Monthly
- Impact factor: 3.481 (2020)

Standard abbreviations
- ISO 4: Placenta

Indexing
- CODEN: PLACDF
- ISSN: 0143-4004
- LCCN: 80647588
- OCLC no.: 05312765

Links
- Journal homepage; Online archive; Journal page at publisher's site

Placenta is a peer-reviewed medical journal in the field of obstetrics and gynecology. It provides information on scientific and clinical investigations pertaining to placental research and their applications. The journal includes full length and mini reviews, original articles, book reviews, announcements and reports, abstracts of important meetings, and letters to the editor.

It is the official journal of the International Federation of Placenta Associations, which incorporates:

- Australia and New Zealand Placenta Research Association
- European Placenta Group
- Japanese Placenta Association
- the Placenta Association of the Americas
