= Hacky sack =

Ball game

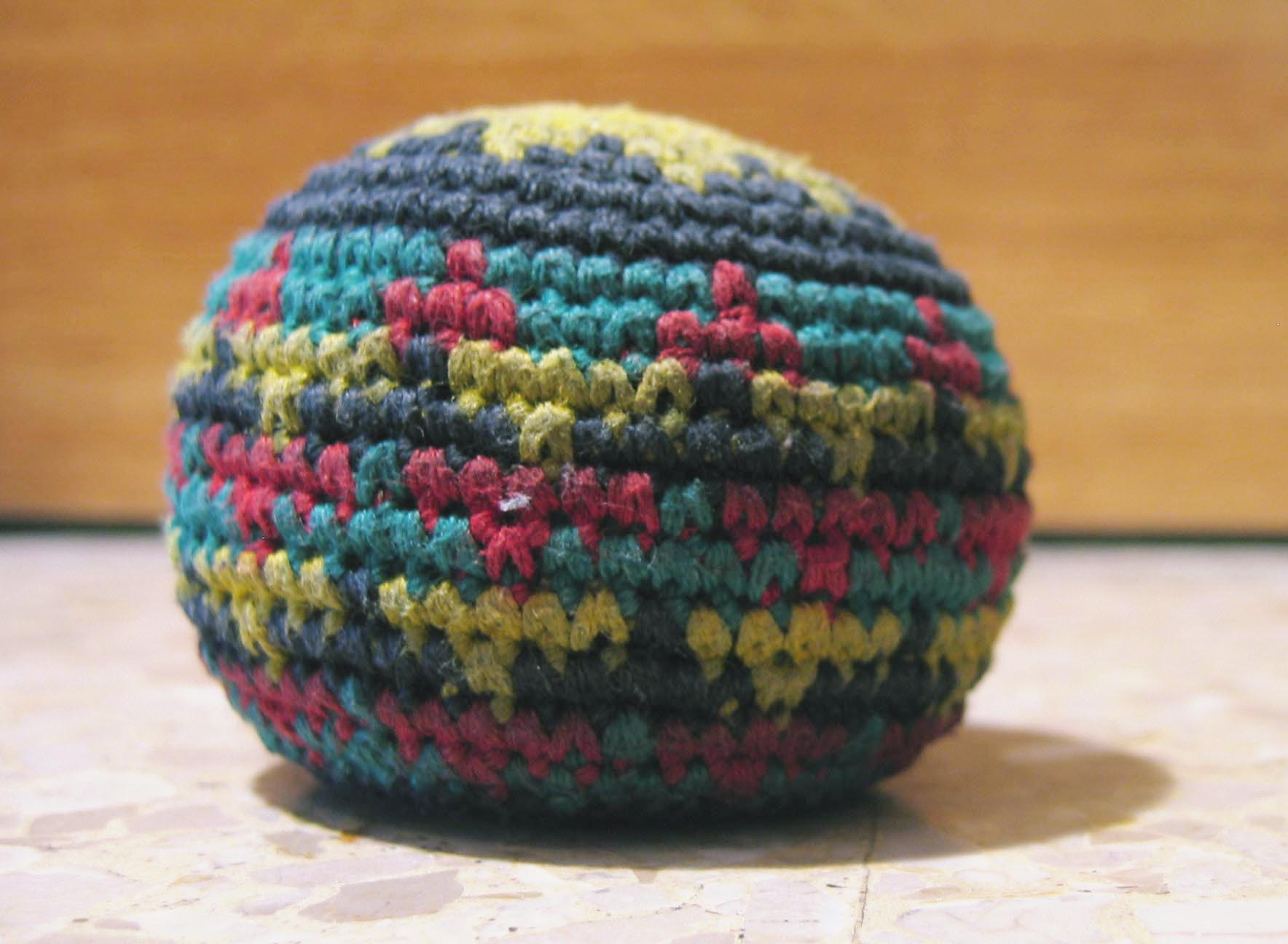
A crocheted footbag

A hacky sack is a small, round bag usually filled with plastic pellets or sand, which is kicked into the air as part of a competitive game or as a display of dexterity. "Hacky Sack" is the name of a brand of footbag popular in the 1970s (currently owned by Wham-O), which has since become a generic trademark.

The most common game of footbag consists of two or more players standing in a circle and trying to keep the sack off the ground for as long as possible.

== History ==
Footbag-like activities have existed for many years. The game is similar to the Japanese game of kemari, and some Southeast Asian games, such as chinlone, sepak takraw and sipa. The same principle is applied in association football–playing countries in activities of freestyle football and keepie uppie. It is also similar to traditional Asian games of kicking the shuttlecock, known as jianzi, chapteh, đá cầu, and jegichagi.

The current Western incarnation of the sport was invented in 1972 by Mike Marshall and John Stalberger of Oregon City, Oregon, United States with their "Hacky Sack" product, the trademark rights to which are now owned by Wham-O. Although Marshall died of a heart attack in 1975, Stalberger continued the business. It gained national popularity in the early 1980s, and Stalberger sold the trademark to Wham-O in 1983.

A few select players have been considered either the greatest freestyler or the greatest net player of all time, including Vasek Klouda for freestyle and Emmanuel Bouchard for net, but few players have claimed a mastery of both disciplines. Ken Shults was the number one player and champion of all disciplines of footbag for many years, which in many people’s eyes has crowned him the title of overall greatest footbag player of all time.

== Equipment ==
For circle kicking, it is very common to use a crocheted footbag, which is usually filled with plastic beads. Casually, footbags are often differentiated as normal (indicating a plastic-pellet filling), or as "dirt bags" or "sand hacks" (indicating a sand filling).

In the freestyle footbag discipline, a 32-panel bag is the generally accepted standard (the number of panels on commercially available bags can range from 2 to 120 panels). Stitchers generally use Plastic Poly Pellets, sand, BB's, steel shot, lead shot, seed bead, or tungsten shot as filler. Most professional stitchers use a custom combination of different fillers to make the bag play better. Bags usually weigh between 40 and 65 grams, depending on the type of filler and amount of filler used. Thirty-two-panel bags do not stall as easily as a "dirt bag" or "sand hack", but set truer from the foot, allowing for more complex tricks. Professional footbags are usually made out of the fabrics ultrasuede light, facile, or amaretta (a sub-brand of Clarino artificial leather). While these bags can last a long time with proper care, they are quite fragile relative to their more common crocheted cousins.

The footbag net discipline uses a distinct bag, characterized by a harder outer surface than other footbags. These bags are not suitable for freestyle, and vice versa.

There are also several novelty products available, including glow in the dark, chain mail, and even flame retardant bags that can be set on fire and played with. The fire footbag has been banned in South Australia.

=== Shoes ===
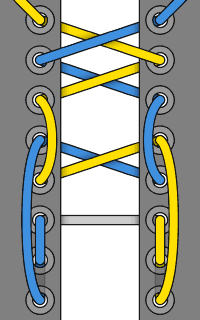
A popular variation of Footbag Lacing, as used by some footbag freestyle players

Most advanced freestylers wear various styles and brands of tennis shoes, the most popular being the Adidas Rod Laver tennis shoe.

Several shoe modifications are common in freestyle footbag. In order to make toe stalling easier, many players use special lacing patterns that pull apart the sides of the shoe near the toe area, creating a broad, rimmed platform. Modified lacing is augmented by cutting away the stitching that joins the row of eyelets to the toe. The area that is created by completing these modifications is called a toe box.

Shoes can be further modified for freestyle footbag by removing layers of fabric from the inside, outside, and toe surfaces. These modifications are advantageous because they allow players to more accurately feel the bag on their foot.

== Games ==
=== Circle kicking ===
Video of four players circle kicking

Circle kicking is the most common game played with a footbag, and is often what people mean when they use the term "hacky sack". Players stand in a circle and keep the bag moving around the circle, with the goal of keeping the bag from touching the ground. There are a variety of terms used by different groups of players to note when the footbag has been touched by every member of the circle.

The game starts when one player picks up the sack and tosses it to the chest of another player, who allows it to fall to their feet so they can kick it, and play begins. Play continues until the sack falls to the ground, then a player picks up the sack and the game resumes. The object of the game is to keep the sack off the ground for as long as possible. If every player gets a touch to the sack before it hits the ground, it is called a 'hack'. If every player gets two touches before the sack hits the ground, it is called a 'double-hack' and so on and so forth.

=== Freestyle footbag ===
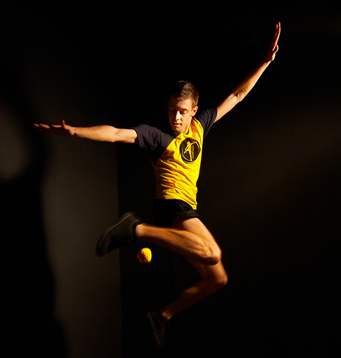
World champion Jan Weber performing a freestyle move

Freestyle footbag is a sport in which the object is to perform tricks with the bag. The ending position of the footbag on one trick becomes the starting position of the footbag on the next trick. Tricks are created by combining different components between contacts with the bag (contacts can be either stalls or kicks, though stalls are more frequent). Components include spins, dexterities (using a leg to circle or cross the footbag's path in mid-air), jumps, and ducks (letting the footbag pass a few inches above the neck). Contacts are usually on the inside of the foot behind the opposite support leg (Clipper Stall) or on the toe, however, many inventive possibilities remain and are used to create an endless list of tricks. A partial list of freestyle footbag tricks can be found at the official Footbag WorldWide Information Service.

Various styles have developed as the sport has become more popular. Players can choreograph routines to music, alone or in pairs, executing difficult moves in sync with the music—the result is something like a cross between rhythmic gymnastics and figure skating.

There is an annual footbag world championships held each year. The current freestyle world champion in singles category is Jan Weber, of Czech Republic.

=== Footbag net ===
In footbag net, players (either playing individually or with a partner) volley a footbag back and forth over a five-foot-high net. This game combines elements of tennis, badminton, and volleyball. The court dimensions and layout are similar to those of badminton; the scoring is similar to the old scoring system in volleyball (a player must be serving to score); and serves must be diagonal, as in tennis. Footbag net games can be played to 11 or 15 points, although the winners must win by at least two points. Rallies in footbag net look a lot like volleyball (e.g., bump, set, and spike), with players spiking from an inverted position in mid-air (over the net) and opponents often digging very fast spikes into bumps or sets. Play in footbag net is very similar to sepak takraw. However, in footbag net, it is an "upper-body foul" if the footbag touches any part of a player's body above the shin.

=== Hacky attack ===
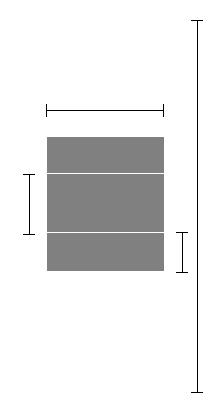
Hacky Attack playing field

Hacky Attack is a particular footbag discipline, played by two teams made up of two players each. It is practiced on a field, generally of sand, formed by a rectangle of 10 m × 15 m (33 ft × 49 ft). One of the two players, the pitcher, tries to hit the opposing pitcher with the ball (footbag), who instead tries to avoid being hit. The other player, the catcher, has instead the task of picking up the ball and passing it to his thrower. When a pitcher is hit, he switches positions with his teammate. The first team to reach 15 points (the point is scored each time the opposing pitcher is hit) wins the game.

=== Hit the man ===
This particular discipline, practiced mainly in Northern Italy, was founded in 2009 by some university students and consists in hitting the opponent with precise and spectacular shots, on the street or in public places. In this game, footbag is commonly called Street Ball, due to its ability to play in a crowd.

=== Other ===
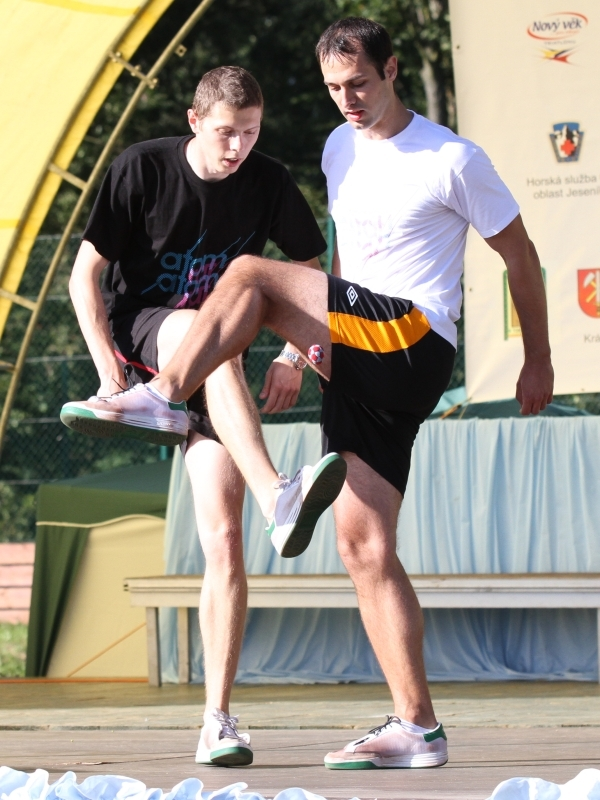
The most successful footbag doubles team, multiple world champions and innovators Martin Sladek and Tomas Tucek

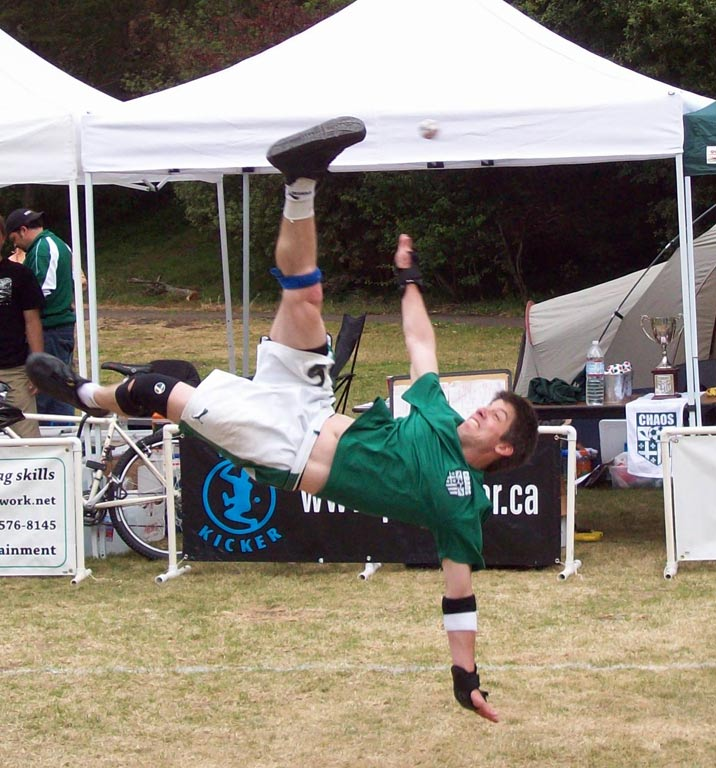
Eric Wulff executing a roll spike at the 2008 Green Cup, San Francisco

Basse
An old Norwegian foot bag game reminiscent of bag ball, where a player defends their circle. Usually, there are five to six players - where everyone plays against everyone. The aim of the game is for a player to defend their own field while attempting to land the Basse inside the field of an opponent. There are World Cup rules, Series Games, and Cup Games.

Buce
A game in which players in a team must juggle the footbag across a field to the opponent's half and score a goal, by kicking the footbag into a small, cylindrical container, usually a bin or pot plant. The sport was invented in Australia in 2007 and is played there with two annual national competitions.

Burn
A game played with two or more players. After the sack is hit three times between two people one can kick the hack at another player yelling out "burn". Once this is done the hacky carries one point with it as it hits another player that point is added to them unless they can hit it with their foot canceling out the burn, or recalling "burn" adding yet another point to the hack in an attempt to hit someone else with two burns and so on. You can add as many burns as you would like before hitting another player or the ground. Either one resets the burns attached to the sack. The person with the lowest burn count at the end of the game wins. Other rules are no self serving the hack at the beginning of the game, you must serve to another player or you get 1 burn point. If you use your hands during game play you also get 1 burn point. Getting hit in the face during a burn attempt counts for 2 points to the player who gets hit. If the hacky sack goes through the legs of a player with their legs in the shape of a 4 in an attempt to hit the hack and someone yells "4 hole" before it hits the ground this is 1 burn point. If the hack goes through someones legs who is just standing there and someone yells "5 hole" 1 point is added to that player. This game is also often played with the rule that once you get to 4 burns you have to walk around the circle and get punch by each opponent with a face hit being an automatic walk.

Hack Slap
A game played with four, six, eight, or more people and the object is to keep the 'footbag' in the air by any means necessary, excluding hands. When someone fails to keep the footbag in the air, hit it with an upward trajectory, or the 'footbag' fails to make it to an opponents square, they are eliminated.

Footbag Golf
A game in which a player must kick the bag towards a designated target (18 inches in diameter and 18 inches off the ground) while navigating the course. A course is usually made up of 9 or 18 holes, and the distance between the tee and target varies from hole to hole. The game can include any number of players. A player begins a hole by teeing off from a six foot by six foot box by tossing the bag in the air and kicking it with the intention of getting the footbag as close to the target as possible. Where the footbag lands and comes to a complete stop is called the lie. After all players have teed off, the player furthest from the target marks the lie and tosses the bag for another kick. All kicks must be made behind the lie and a player cannot move past the lie until the kick is completed. Once all the players have successfully kicked their bags into the target, they may move on to the next hole.

Horse
A game that can be played with any number of players and is a great way to improve one's freestyle. One of the players performs any freestyle move they choose, then passes it on to the next player who then attempts to perform the same move. If the player performs the move correctly then that they perform a different move of their choice and then pass it on. If they fail to do the move then they get a letter "H" (if they miss again on the next round they get an "O") and passes it on to the next player who chooses a new trick. Once a player spells the word "Horse" they are out.

Kick Back
A game at which a player can kick the footbag against the backstop of a handball court, alone or with others. It needs a very firm footbag to bounce back. A simple score can be kept or not.

Killer
A game similar to War. The hacky sack is kicked around and after a certain number of kicks, a player can kick the sack at another player, trying to peg them. If the hacky sack hits them they are out unless they can hack the sack back in to the circle before it hits the ground. Self-serving, tossing the sack to yourself, is often banned in this game and if done the round is stopped and the rule breaker is pegged, thrown, with the sack.

Knockout
A game that can be played with any number of players, in which players are eliminated by failure to hit the hack. The hack is passed around randomly to any player, and the goal is to keep it going indefinitely; if the hack lands on the ground near another player who could have hit it (within 2 feet of him/her), that player is eliminated for the failure. If the hack lands drastically out of range of any player, then the player who kicked it out of bounds is eliminated. Some groups can apply a more strict rule where, when the hack drops, any player who lifts their foot off the ground in an attempt to kick it is eliminated.

Number Catch
A game where any number of players (best played with 3 or 4) have to alternate turns hitting the footbag as many times as possible and must catch it for the points to count if the bag is dropped the player must subtract the points from their score. This game may be played to a certain score or a certain time to get as many points as possible.

Numbers
A game in which players form a circle and the person who starts kicks the hack once. Then the second person kicks it twice and so on and so forth. If the hack touches the ground before the player achieves their number, the player gets one chance to start where they left off. If the player does not achieve their number, they pass the footbag on to the next player, and if they achieve that number the previous player is out.

Shark
A game where two or more players can play. The goal is to hit the sack a previously set number of times before a player catches it and says: "shark." When the person says "shark" the other players must stay where they are, and the "shark" has the ability to throw it at any player. If a player is hit, the player is out or has a point that goes against their score. Last player standing wins. When a player says "shark", the others players can move only one foot once to reposition themself. It is common to use that one move to dodge the sack.

War
A game for any number of players. The footbag is served and after a predetermined number (usually three) of kicks (whether by one person, or collectively as a group) everyone tries to catch it. The person who catches the footbag throws it at one of the other players who try to either dodge or catch it. If the footbag hits someone they are out, but if they catch it the person who threw it is out. The game can be played with any number of outs. Also known by the names "Pelt", "Three Balls of Fire", "Three Hit Kill", "Three Hack Wack", "Applesauce", "Red Dot", and "God".

== Rules ==
There are many variations of hacky sack, therefore there are no standardized rules to govern each version. There are however unwritten rules; for example in circle kicking, players should only serve the ball to players standing next to them rather than serving to themselves. If a player also drops the ball, he is responsible for retrieving it. To complete the circle and get a hack, the ball should pass through all the players without touching the ground. One circle is called a hack, double circle is called double hack and so forth. In the footbag net, only two kicks are allowed per side for singles and three kicks per side for doubles.

== See also ==
- Basse
- Bean bag
- Cuju
- International Footbag Players' Association
- Sepak takraw
