= Martin Sladek =

Czech footbag player

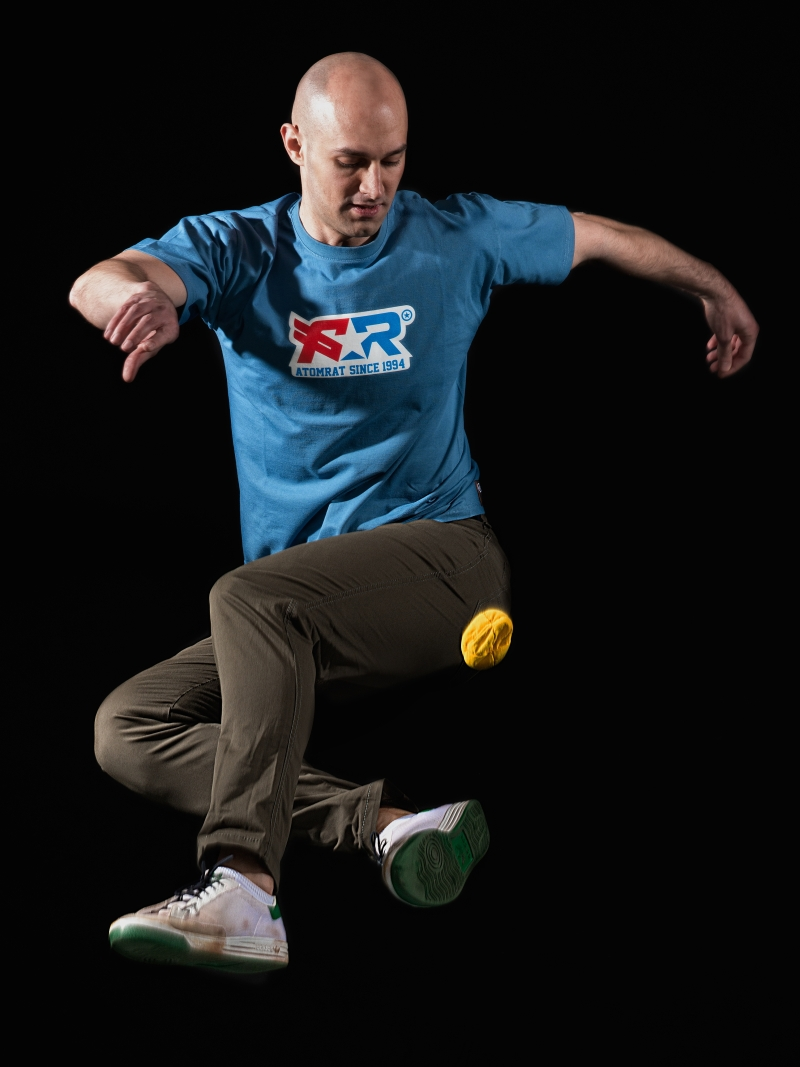

Personal information
- Born: 17 April 1988 (age 38) Hradec Králové, Czechoslovakia
- Height: 1.88 m (6 ft 2 in)

Sport
- Country: Czech Republic
- Sport: Footbag
Medal record
Representing Czech Republic
Men's Footbag
IFPA World Footbag Championships
Gold medal – first place	2016 Trnava	doubles
Gold medal – first place	2015 Copenhagen	doubles
Gold medal – first place	2014 Paris	doubles
Silver medal – second place	2012 Warsaw	doubles
Gold medal – first place	2011 Helsinki	doubles
Gold medal – first place	2009 Berlin	doubles
Gold medal – first place	2009 Berlin	circle
Silver medal – second place	2008 Prague	doubles
European Footbag Championships
Gold medal – first place	2012 Aachen	doubles
Gold medal – first place	2010 Brussels	doubles
Silver medal – second place	2009 Strzelin	doubles
Bronze medal – third place	2005 Wroclaw	doubles

Martin Sladek (born April 17, 1988) is multiple world and European freestyle footbag champion. He won the world title in 2009, 2011, 2014-2016. In 2009 he won in 2 disciplines: the main one (Open Doubles Freestyle) and Doubles Circle Contest (technical discipline). He won the 1st place in 2008-The most successful athlete in the Special sport performance category and also judges at world footbag championships of footbag. His routines reached the best level of technical merit, artistic impression and cooperation (all the criteria that are judged) and the performance presented by him at the 2009 world footbag championship in Berlin is the top rated performance in all the three criteria in the history of the sport.

He has performed over 2 000 professional shows and workshops. From other sports he likes to play tennis.

Besides sport he is focused on trading (investing) and skill card game poker (mainly no limit Texas hold'em).

He is an absolvent of two university fields of study. In 2009 he graduated in Management, Marketing and Logistics in Communications and in 2011 in Economics and Enterprise Management.

== Doubles discipline ==
Open Doubles Freestyle is one of the main disciplines in the sport of footbag. Competitors perform 2,5-3 minutes long routine to any music of their choice. The scoring of performances is quite similar to the scoring of figure skating. There are 6 judges giving their marks for technical merit, artistic impression and cooperation of the performance. The technical mark includes mainly difficulty, variety and execution of performed tricks. The artistic mark includes mainly choreography, "communication" with spectators and originality. Cooperation requires even distribution of players' effort, coordination, difficulty and variety of formations. All three marks are strongly influenced by the number of mistakes (these mistakes are called drops). All marks from all judges are transformed into the final score.

He has invented many tricks and concepts and displays them in his routines and shows.

== Gallery ==
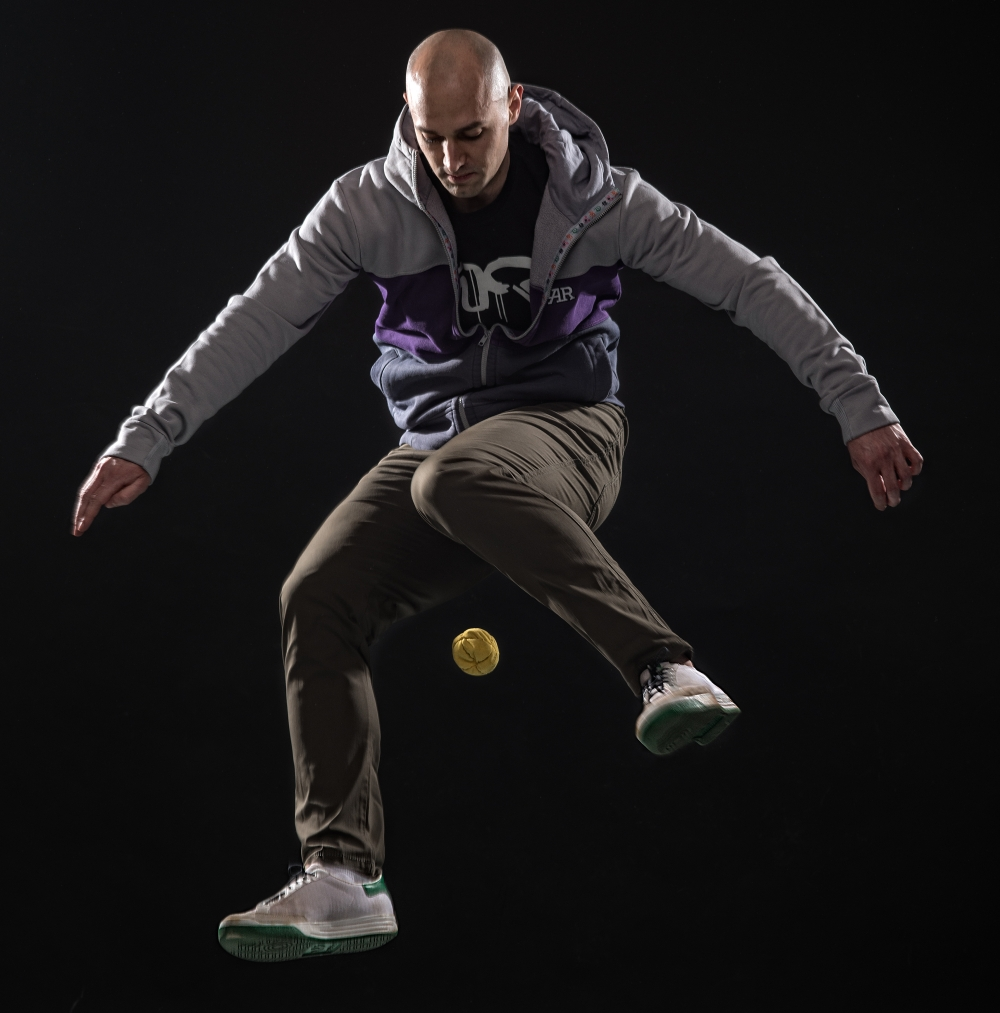
Martin Sladek performing Double Leg Over footbag trick in atelier
