= Mike Marshall (inventor) =

American inventor of footbag

Mike Marshall (ca. 1947 – 1975) was an American inventor best known for his co-invention, with John Stalberger, of the sport footbag and the Hacky Sack in 1972. Marshall was living in Oregon when he met Stalberger. Stalberger was undergoing rehabilitation for his knee and so he began to exercise with Marshall, who was kicking around a homemade beanbag.

Marshall died in 1975 at the age of 28 from a heart attack. He was inducted into the Footbag Hall of Fame in 1999. The Footbagger of the Year award changed its name in 1990 to the Mike Marshall Award in his memory.
