= Outline of games =

Overview of and topical guide to games

The following outline is provided as an overview of and topical guide to games:

A game is a structured type of play usually undertaken for entertainment or fun. Games can also be work, art or an educational tool.

== Definition ==
- Chris Crawford
- Ludwig Wittgenstein
- Roger Caillois
- Other definitions

== Purpose ==
Individuals participate in game-play for various reasons, depending upon the aspect the particular game covers. These include:

- Education – The transmission of knowledge, skills and character traits.
  - Learning analytics – Collecting data about learners for understanding and optimizing learning.
- Entertainment – Activity that holds attention or gives pleasure.
  - Play – Intrinsically motivated recreation.
  - Social relation – Interpersonal relationship between two or more people.
- Pleasure – Experience that feels good, is enjoyable.
  - Hobby – A regular pleasurable activity.
- Strategy – Plan to achieve goals in uncertainty.
  - Tactics – Conceptual action or short series of actions with the aim of achieving a short-term goal.

== Classification ==
- Game classification
  - By cause of uncertainty

=== Genre ===
- Party games
- Tabletop games
- Video games
- Other games

== Lists of games ==
=== Party games ===
- Party game#Common party games
- Party game#Children's party games

=== Tabletop games ===
- List of board games
  - List of cross and circle games
- List of card games
- List of dice games
- List of domino games
- List of tabletop role-playing games

=== Video games ===
- By platform
- By developer
- By publisher
- By hardware
- By date
- By character or franchise
- By feature
- By region
- By genre
- By technology
- By license
- By player type
- By reception
- Other

=== Other ===
- List of fictional games
- List of games that Buddha would not play
- List of role-playing games
- List of traditional children's games

== Game elements ==
- Clock
- Game controller
- Game media
- Lists of video game consoles
- Lusory attitude
- Marble
- Stadium
- Teetotum
- User guide

=== Tabletop ===
- Chess set
  - Chessboard
  - Chess piece
    - Bishop
    - King
    - Knight
    - Pawn
    - Queen
    - Rook
- Dice
  - Long dice
- Dominoes
- Game board
- Gamemaster
  - Gamemaster's screen
- Piece
  - Meeple
  - Miniatures
  - Player character
- Playing card
  - French-suited
  - German-suited
  - Italian-suited
  - Portuguese-suited
  - Spanish-suited
  - Swiss-suited
- Play money
  - Casino chip

== Players ==
- Player – Participant in a game.
  - Gamer – Participant in video games or tabletop games

=== Lists of players ===
- List of chess players
- List of esports players

== History ==
- Pre-modern
- Modern

== Game development ==
- Game development kit
- Tabletop game industry
- Video game developer
- Video game industry
- Video game modding

=== Game design ===
- Dynamic music
- Emergent gameplay
- Game balance
- Game design process
- Game mechanics
- Game of chance
- House rule – Unofficial modifications to official rules of a game.
- Simultaneous action selection

==== Video game ====
- Dynamic game difficulty balancing
- Gold sink
- Game designer

== Game theory ==
- Cooperative game
- Evolutionary game theory
- Extensive form game
  - Information set
- Kingmaker scenario
- List of games in game theory
- Normal-form game
- Payoff matrix
- Perfect information

== Outlines of games ==
- Outline of chess
- Outline of games
- Outline of poker
- Outline of video games

== See also ==
- Game club
- Game semantics
- Ludology
- Play
- Puzzle
- Sport
- Toy
- List of puzzle topics
- List of impossible puzzles
- List of puzzle-based computer and video games
