= Maternity parking =

Parking space reserved for pregnant women

A sign in Taiwan, designating parking for pregnant women and parents with children under six years old

Maternity parking is a designated space for pregnant women, as they may experience uncomfortable symptoms (especially in the later stages of pregnancy) and have difficulty walking. Some jurisdictions do not have a separate area but instead allow those who qualify for maternity parking to use disabled parking spaces, while this action would lead to fines in other areas. In the United States, the Pregnant Workers Fairness Act requires employers to provide reasonable accommodations for pregnant workers, which may include offering parking spaces closer to the workplace. Private businesses may choose to offer designated spaces to both pregnant women and new parents. Maternity parking has been criticized for treating pregnancy as an inherently disabling condition.

== See also ==
- Women's parking space
- Men's parking space
- Maternity leave
- Invisible disability
