= ASTERIG =

Assessment Tool to Measure and Evaluate the Risk Potential of Gambling Products

ASTERIG is the English acronym for Assessment Tool to Measure and Evaluate the Risk Potential of Gambling Products. It was initially developed in Germany from 2006 to 2010 and became validated globally in 2013 under the head of the Columbia University, New York, United States.

== Background ==
Gambling and betting is an important part of many people's lives as it gives them great pleasure all over the world. However, every gambling and betting product can have negative consequences; some individuals develop a recurrent, maladaptive pattern of gambling behaviour which can develop into pathological gambling. The individual risk depends on the personality of the player as well as on the characteristics of the gambling product. So, the addiction risk of e.g. a lottery should differ fundamentally from that of a slot machine, whereby criteria such as the size and frequency of a jackpot or the type of offer (offline versus online) can significantly influence the risk potential.

Problematic gambling behaviour is more than just an individual problem. It is often associated with financial losses, disruption of affected families as well as interpersonal relationships, and accompanied by psychiatric disorders. Thus, it can evolve into a social affair that affects the entire personal environment of the pathological player or even the respective national economy.

ASTERIG is a systematic measuring and evaluation tool to assess the addiction risk potential of different gambling products. The tool uses numeric scores to measure how high the addiction risk potential of a gambling product can be and highlights where the specific risk potential of each specific gambling product is located. Therefore, ten non-significantly intercorrelating parameters are considered and weighted according to the strength of their influence. It thus allows a mathematical-objective comparison of possible addiction risk potentials between different, possibly also similar gambling products. Additionally, ASTERIG accentuates where exactly, this means, at which characteristic or characteristics of the respective game of chance, the addiction risk potential can be promoted or reduced.

ASTERIG offers the possibility of conducting a quantitative comparison in the form of a systematic measurement and evaluation instrument with comparable scores, more specifically, a comparatively evaluable scale. The tool helps both legislators and jurisprudence as well as the administrative practice in the countries and states, which publicly permit and offer gambling and betting. A scientifically substantiated classification of gambling products into comparatively measurable risk levels is undisputed, also in an international context. Similar research has been carried out in the UK, Finland and Sweden. But as their theoretical or empirical foundations have not yet been published, the scientific assessment of these instruments is difficult.

ASTERIG was originally developed by Franz Wilhelm Peren and Reiner Clement. ASTERIG has been globally validated by:

Expert	Country	Institution
Carlos Blanco	USA	Department of Psychiatry Columbia University, New York State Psychiatric Institute
Alex Blaszczynski	AUS	University of Sydney, School of Psychology
Reiner Clement	GE	Bonn-Rhein-Sieg University
Jeffrey Derevensky	CAN	McGill University, International Centre for Youth Gambling Problems and High Risk Behaviors
Anna E. Goudriaan	NL	University of Amsterdam, Academic Medical Center
David C. Hodgins	CAN	University of Calgary, Department of Psychology
Ruth J. van Holst	NL	University of Amsterdam, Academic Medical Center
Ángela Ibáñez	ESP	Alcala University, Department of Psychiatry, Ramon y Cajal Hospital
Silvia S. Martins	USA	Columbia University, Mailman School of Public Health
Chantal Moersen	GE	Charité Berlin
Sabrina Molinaro	I	CNR – Istituto di Fisiologia Clinica Sezione di Epidemiologia Pisa
Adrian Parke	UK	University of Lincoln
Franz W. Peren	GE	Bonn-Rhein-Sieg University
Nancy M. Petry	USA	University of Connecticut, Health Center
Heather Wardle	UK	National Centre for Social Research

== See also ==
- game of chance
- online gambling
- problem gambling
