= Männergarten =

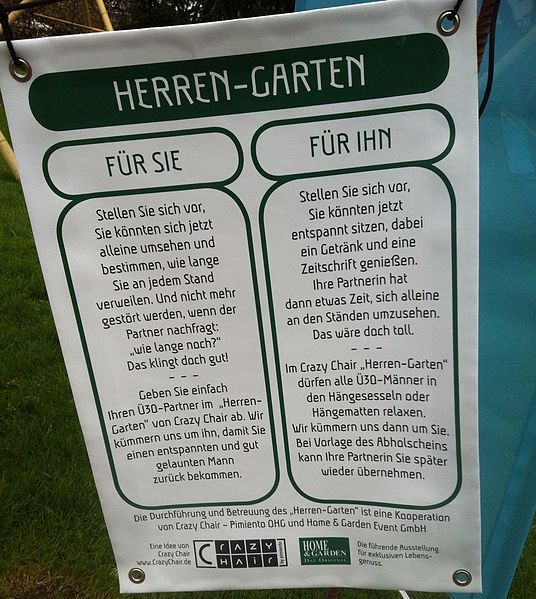
A Herrengarten (Herr=Sir) offer on the Castrop-Rauxel Home&Garden tradefair

A Männergarten or Herrengarten is a temporary day-care and activities space for men in German-speaking countries while their wives or girlfriends go shopping. The word is a compound literally meaning "men's garden", formed by analogy to kindergarten.

Historically, the expression has also been used for gender-specific sections in lunatic asylums, monasteries and clinics.

While a "husband chair" is the informal English expression for smaller waiting areas for men in women's clothing shops, Germans ironically call it Männerparkplatz (men's parking space), meaning "a place where men can be parked". The similar-sounding men's parking space in Triberg is however a marketing gag in a parking garage, where bays difficult to reach are dedicated for real men.

== Männergarten, Männerparkplatz, Garderie pour hommes ==
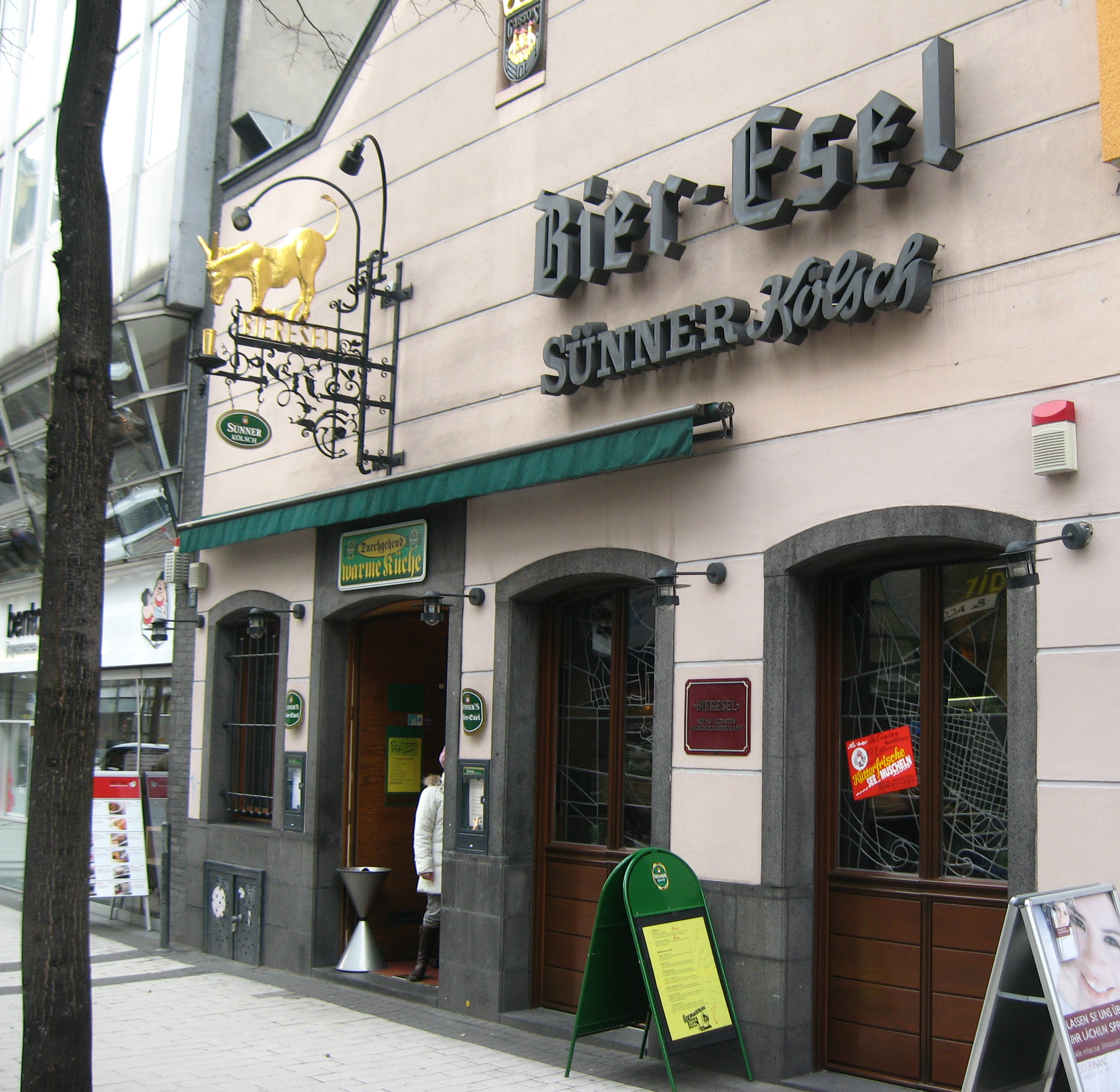
Bier-Esel inn in Cologne

The first Männergarten in Germany opened in Hamburg in 2003. At the Bleichenhof Mall, each Saturday men were entitled for a flat fee to two beers, a snack and access to male-oriented amusements: a model railway, handicrafts, men's magazines and sport broadcasts.

The marketing concept was reported widely and received an ironic media response. Frankfurter Allgemeine Zeitung published an article entitled – "day care offer - have your man being taken care of per hour".

There were several copies and follow-ups. In Cologne, the locally famous Bier-Esel Inn opened the first Männergarten in North Rhine-Westphalia on Saturdays in its biergarten. Die Welt commented under the title "Here you get rid of your husband". Another restaurant in Hamburg offering churrascaria for coach tours introduced a special offer for such groups: while the women shop, men have fun in the Männergarten and on gender-specific excursions.

Some German municipalities have Männergärten as temporary events. Obernzell in Bavaria offered a weißwurst breakfast, lunch, coffee and schafkopf, a Nagelbalken competition and an entertainment programme with a local association showing historical Zündapp mopeds. On International Women's Day 2012, Xanten offered a men's day care programme in a computer shop. The same service, described as a Männerparkplatz, was offered in the Black Forest town of St. Georgen im Schwarzwald.

French shopping malls have similar offers under the tag garderie pour hommes, for example the Galeries Lafayette in Paris or temporarily in 2010 in Carré Sénart.

IKEA tried the concept for four days in 2011 in a shop in Sydney. It meant to offer women a spending reprieve from "whining husbands" over Father's Day weekend. Echoing their Smaland daycare service for children, it was called Manland.

== Media response ==
The Week quoted complaints that reading books were not encouraged in Manland and criticizing the similarity to the childcare creche, since women were given a buzzer which went off after 30 minutes as a way to treat men like whining children. The offer would reinforce the notion that only women were responsible for home care. As well it would overlook gay couples.

Deutsche Welle translated Männergarten tongue in cheek as "adult daycare center" on its English website. The use in satire has not stopped major stores like IKEA from providing such premises temporarily, the background being the growth of gender-specific marketing. Some municipalities and organisations provide a "men's programme" analogous to the First Ladies programmes for women during conferences and state events.

== Background ==
Männerparkplätze or Männergärten seek to meet a special need for gender-specific marketing. Martin Huber in the Swiss Tagesanzeiger referred to a survey which suggests that a quarter of couples have quarrels during shopping and a third have experienced losing sight of each other. Furthermore, Huber refers to female customer requests to IKEA asking in a tongue-in-cheek manner for a day-care center for their husbands analogous to the Småland provided for their children. The Week was not sure whether Manland "had set retail shopping forward by three decades or set gender equality back by three decades."

Kristof Magnusson's comedy Männerhort (Men's day care centre / creche) was a success with the Komödie Düsseldorf and is based on a man cave in a large department store. It deals with a similar problem as the commercial Männergarten concept, but limits access to three men at a time.
