= Two-player game =

Multiplayer game that is played by just two players

A two-player game is a multiplayer game that is played by precisely two players. This is distinct from a solitaire game, which is played by only one player.

== Examples ==
The following are some examples of two-player games. This list is not intended to be exhaustive.

- Board games:
  - Chess
  - Checkers
  - Go
  - Xiangqi
  - Some wargames, such as Hammer of the Scots
- Card games:
  - Cribbage
  - Whist
  - Rummy
  - 66
  - Pinochle
  - Magic: The Gathering, a collectible card game in which players duel
- Sports:
  - Cue sports, a family of games that use cue sticks and billiard balls
  - Many athletic games, such as tennis (singles)
- Video games:
  - Pong
  - A Way Out

== See also ==
- List of types of games
- Zero-sum game
