= Groping =

Touching another person in a sexual way without consent

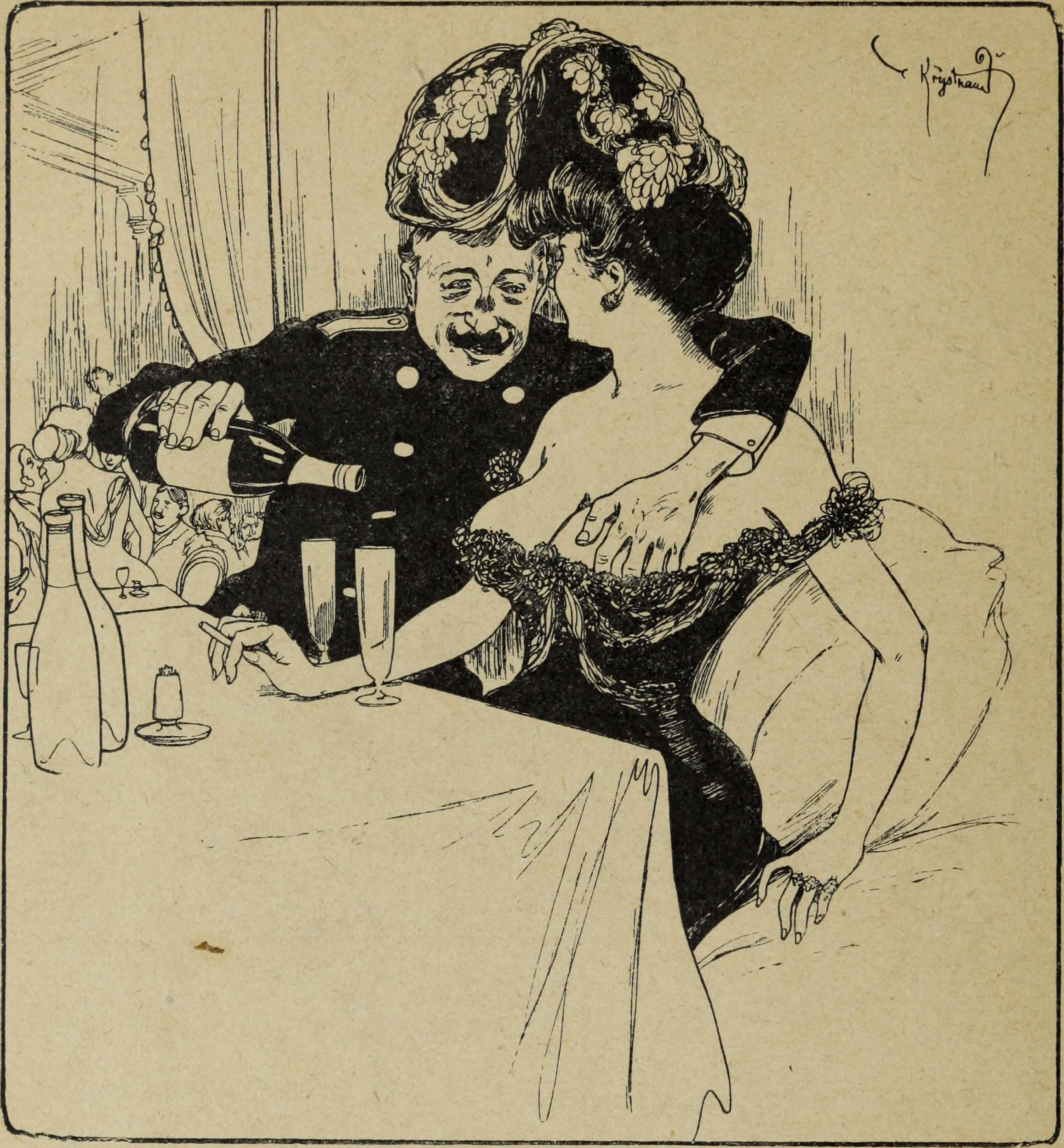
"Gallant images and spirit of the foreigner" (1905)

Groping is a type of sexual assault involving the inappropriate touching of another person commonly without their consent. The term generally has a negative connotation in many societies. Touching a consenting person's body during sexual activity, a massage, or a medical examination is not usually considered groping, though the term is sometimes used to include clumsy, selfish, or intentional non-consensual touching of intimate body parts. Areas of the body most frequently groped include the buttocks, breasts, vulva, thigh, penis, and scrotum. Gropers might use their hands, but pressing any part of their body against another person can be considered groping.

Toucherism, considered a paraphilia, is a practice of a person touching another non-consenting person with their hands, typically in crowds, for their own sexual pleasure. Groping may be depicted in pornographic films.

== Cultural incidents ==
Italy used to have a reputation for men pinching women's bottoms, and the term groping could perhaps be applied, but it was not a common term at that time (mid-20th century, for example). Japan has a reputation for men groping women on trains and buses to the extent that the authorities have implemented anti-groping campaigns, which has received considerable media attention and been the subject of serious study in recent years.

In parts of South Asia, especially Pakistan, India, Nepal, and Bangladesh, public sexual harassment or molestation (often known as "street harassment") of women by men is widely referred to as Eve teasing.

In Australia, in August 2019, the host at a charity event offered his cheek to a female guest presenter for a peck, before turning his head and kissing her on the lips. The presenter publicly said: "That kind of behaviour is intolerable and the time for women being subject to it or having to tolerate it is long gone." The host apologised for his behaviour. In 2021, immunity to charges of sexual harassment was withdrawn from Australian politicians.

In April 2019, a doctor in Pennsylvania was charged with indecent assault for touching a male patient's penis during a medical examination. The doctor, 56-year-old William Vollmar, had faced numerous allegations dating back to 2015. On November 12, 2020, Vollmar pleaded no contest and was sentenced to 9 to 20 years in a state prison.

In June 2022, British MP Christopher Pincher was suspended from the Conservative Party after it was alleged that he had groped two men, while drunk, at London's Carlton Club.

== Combatting groping ==
In practice, women are the predominant targets for groping. To combat groping, street harassment, and Eve teasing of women in crowded public places, some countries have also designated women only spaces. For example, sex-segregated buses, women-only passenger cars, and compartments on trains have been introduced in Mexico, Japan, the Philippines, the UAE, and other countries to reduce such sexual harassment.

Some places in Germany, Korea, and China have women's parking spaces, often for related safety issues.

In India, safety measures are implemented in both dining and transportation sectors. Restaurants frequently designate separate 'family sections' to segregate women and families from general seating areas. Similarly, intercity bus booking platforms often identify the gender of passengers on seating charts and restrict male users from reserving seats adjacent to women.

However, the enforcement of protective measures remains highly inconsistent, and safety risks persist in public spaces. Studies indicate that sexual harassment, including groping, remains prevalent on mass transit systems such as metro services and local trains despite segregation policies.

Additionally, national crime data documents a high incidence of sexual offenses against minors in these environments, with reports showing a significant portion of abuse cases even in high-traffic public areas.

=== Japan ===
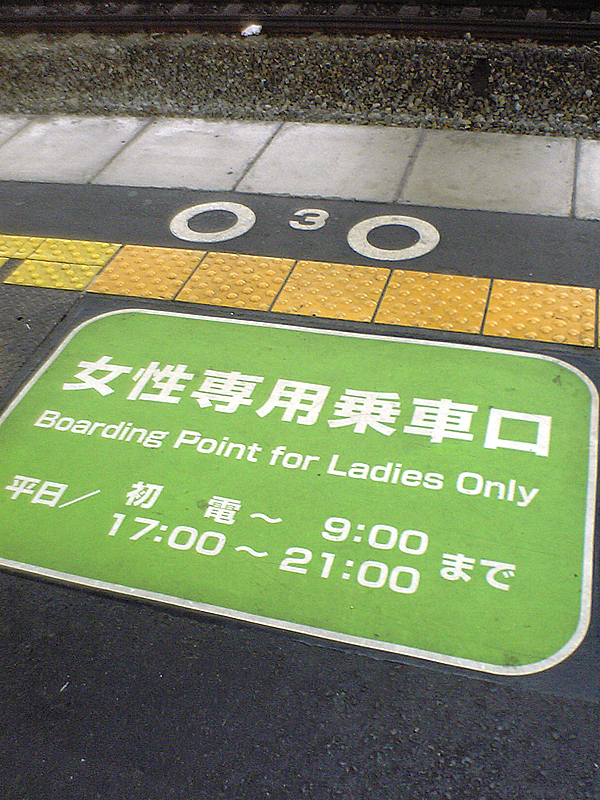
A sign on a station platform in Osaka, Japan, showing the boarding point for a ladies-only car

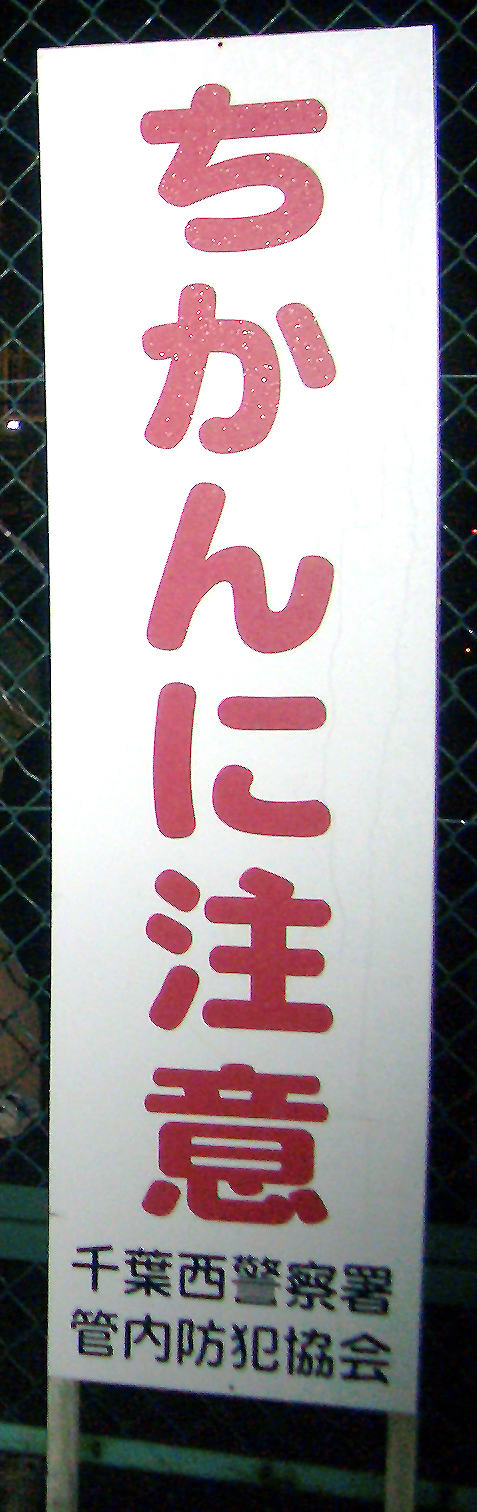
A sign outside of a bicycle parking lot in Chiba, Japan, warns "Beware of groping".

In Japan, a man who gropes women in public is called chikan (痴漢); and the term also describes the act itself. Crowded trains are a common place for groping and a 2001 survey conducted in two Tokyo high schools revealed that more than two thirds of female students had been groped while traveling on them. As part of the effort to combat the problem, some railway companies designate women-only passenger cars during rush hours.

While the term is not defined in the Japanese legal system, vernacular usage of the word describes acts that violate several laws. Although crowded trains are the most frequent targets, another common setting is bicycle parking areas, where people bending over unlocking locks are targeted. Chikan is often featured in Japanese pornography.

This issue affects men in a different way. Since Japan has a very high conviction rate (99% by some sources), innocent men may have difficulty proving their innocence in court. The film I Just Didn't Do It by Japanese film director Masayuki Suo, based on a true story, focuses on a male office worker acquitted of groping after a five-year legal battle.

=== United States ===
The charge can vary from state to state but generally is considered to be sexual battery, sexual groping, or unlawful touching. In some jurisdictions, groping is considered criminal sexual conduct, in the second to fourth degree, if there is no sexual penetration.

- Louisiana: Title 14, criminal law RS 14:43.1; §43.1. Sexual battery: A. Sexual battery is the intentional touching of the anus or genitals of the victim by the offender using any instrumentality or any part of the body of the offender, or the touching of the anus or genitals of the offender by the victim using any instrumentality or any part of the body of the victim, when any of the following occur: (1) The offender acts without the consent of the victim.
- Michigan: The Michigan Penal Code (except), Act 328 of 1931, 750.520e Criminal sexual conduct in the fourth degree; misdemeanor. Groping is considered Criminal Sexual Conduct specifically; (v) When the actor achieves the sexual contact through concealment or by the element of surprise.

== See also ==
- Personal space
- Sexual harassment
- Non-penetrative sex
- Eve teasing
- Frotteurism
- Debagging
- Gropecunt Lane
