= Glossary of domino terms =

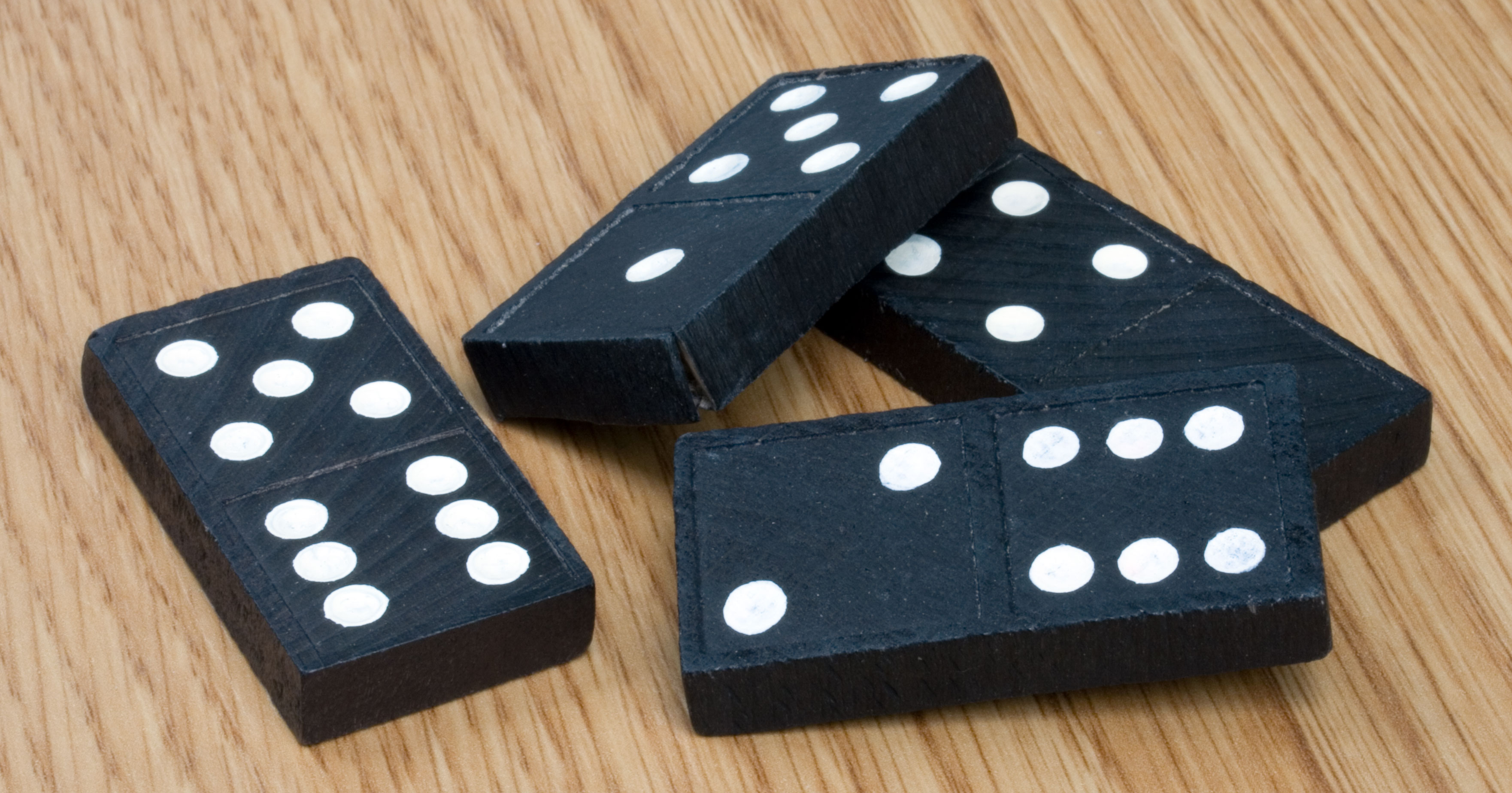
Domino tiles

The following is a glossary of terms used in dominoes. Besides the terms listed here, there are numerous regional or local slang terms. Terms in this glossary should not be game-specific, i.e. specific to one particular version of dominoes, but apply to a wide range of domino games. For glossaries that relate primarily to one game or family of similar games, see the relevant article.

== A ==
Ace
The end of a tile marked with one spot. A 'one'.

arm
A single straight line of tiles within the tableau. McLeod specifies that it only has one open end.

== B ==
back
The broad surface of a tile with no pips or bar. They may be entirely blank or have a design which is the same on every tile. The reverse side of a tile.

banker
Also called the house, the person responsible, in a banking game for distributing chips, keeping track of the stakes and paying winners at the end. A dealer against whom the punters bet.

banker's set
The 3-2 (🁈) domino tile, so called because, if set in a scoring game, it cannot be scored on.

bar
The line dividing the face of a tile into two halves. Also divider or centre line.

bid
The number of points a player undertakes to achieve if they win the auction in bidding games. The winning bidder names trumps and leads.

bidding game
Game in which there is an auction where players bid the number of tricks they hope to take. The winning bidder announces trumps and sets the first tile

blank
A tile half with no pips. Also pale, white or zero.

block

1. To play a tile whose suit an opponent cannot follow.
2. Alternative name for tile.
3. Alternative name for a block game.
4. Alternative name for a blocked game.

block game
Domino game in which the aim is to play tiles to the layout in order to block opponents so that they cannot play. Unlike point games, block games are scored at the end of a round.

blocked game
A situation in which no player is able to play or draw from the boneyard.

blocking game
A game in which scores are calculated at the end of a hand and not after individual plays. The aim is to block an adversary and be first to domino.

bones
See tiles.

boneyard
Pool of face down, spread (unstacked) tiles from which players draw. Also pool, reserve or stock.

bricks
See tiles.

buy
See draw.

== C ==
card
Technical name for the pieces in a domino set. See tiles.

card game
Domino game in which the tiles are used like playing cards.

centre line, center line, centre, center
See bar.

chip out
To play the last tile of your hand.

count

1. The amount of gains at any stage of a game.
2. To reckon or score the game.

Cribbage board
Scoring equipment comprising a wooden board with holes and pegs used for keeping score in Cribbage but also used for dominoes.

cut [a suit]
To play all of a suit except the double, leaving the player with the double unable to domino.

cut in
To take turns in playing when five or more players want to participate in a four-hand game.

== D ==
deck
See domino set.

Deuce
The end of tile marked with two spots. A 'two'.

divider, dividing line
See bar.

domino

1. To play all the tiles in a hand, usually ending play for the round. Hence 'dominoed' or 'dominoer'.
2. An individual piece in a domino set. According to John McLeod, however, this popular usage is incorrect.
3. The 1-1 or double-1 (🀹) tile.

domino set
A complete batch of tiles, each one occurring exactly once, that is used to play one or more domino games. Sets vary in size; for example, a double-six set has 28 tiles and a double-eight set has 45 tiles. Also deck or pack.

dominoes
Plural of domino. "Dominos" is incorrect.

door
Last unplayed tile of a suit (whose play closes the door).

dot
See pip.

double, doublet, double domino
A tile on which both ends have the same pip value e.g. the tile with two sixes (🁡) is a "double six".

double-six dominoes, double-six set, double 6s, double six
Domino set made up of 28 tiles with all the combinations from 0 to 6.

double-eight dominoes, double-eight set, double 8s, double eight
Domino set, common in Austria, made up of 45 tiles with all the combinations from 0 to 8.

double-nine dominoes, double-nine set, double 9s, double nine
Domino set made up of 55 tiles with all the combinations from 0 to 9.

double-twelve dominoes, double-twelve set, double 12s, double twelve
Domino set made up of 91 tiles with all the combinations from 0 to 12.

double-fifteen dominoes, double-fifteenset, double 15s, double fifteen
Domino set made up of 136 tiles with all the combinations from 0 to 15.

doubles game
A four-handed, partnership game.

doublet
See double.

draw
To transfer a tile from the boneyard to the hand.

draw game
Domino game in which players draw tiles from the boneyard during play, but only score at the end of the round.

== E ==
end

1. One of the two sides on the face of a tile, divided by the central dividing line, that is marked with a suit.
2. The surface of a tile furthest from the centre, a tile having two ends, two sides a face and a back.
3. That half of a tile in a line of tiles that may be played upon (also "open end").

exposed tile
Tile that has been turned face up by mistake, usually incurring a penalty.

== F ==
face
The broad surface of a tile that displays the pips and bar.

following domino
Any tile that plays or scores after a previous score.

== G ==
game

1. A session at dominoes played between two or more players to a given set of rules.
2. A series of hands resulting in a player or partnership making a winning score. See also round, hand and match.

go domino
See go out.

go out
To be first to play one's last remaining tile in a matching or scoring game.

== H ==
hand

1. The set of tiles that belong to each player, not usually held in the hand, but placed on edge on the table facing him or her.
2. The cycle of rounds played with those tiles as part of a game. See also round, game, match.
3. Same as round.

head
The best piece in a player's hand.

heavy
High-numbered. A 'heavy' tile or tile end is one with a high number of pips. The half of a tile with the greater number of pips is the heavy end. Some games start with the player who holds the heaviest tile setting it first.

hit the deck
To be forced to draw from the boneyard (aka deck) because you have no playable tiles.

== J ==
jam
To play the last tile of a suit and leave that suit exposed at all ends of the tableau, thus blocking the game.

== K ==
kicker
In scoring games, a domino that will score 1 point more than the previous play. These are all the 5s and the 6-1 (🁜) tile.

knock
See pass.

== L ==
lay piece
A piece that is not of the trump suit.

lay suit
A suit that is not trumps.

layout
See tableau.

lead

1. The first play made by the player who is on set.
2. The player who directs the play for his team.
3. The first piece played in a given hand.

leader

1. Player who sets the first tile.
2. A double played in a matching or scoring game when a player has no matching tiles in his hand.

light
Low-numbered. A 'light' tile or tile end is one with a low number of pips. The half of a tile with the fewer pips is the lighter end. Some games start with the player holding the lightest tile leading.

lighthouse
A double in the hand with no matching tiles in the same hand. Played first it is a "lighthouse set".

line
A layout that has two open ends, as opposed to an arm which only has one.

line of play
An arm or line of tiles which is open for play. Dominoes may be joined to it with the line of play or across the line of play.

== M ==
make, make the dominoes.
See shuffle.

make domino
See go out.

man overboard
Said when a player has no matching tiles and is forced to hit the deck i.e. draw from the boneyard.

match

1. Series of games needed for a player or team to win. See also round, hand, and game.
2. To play a tile such that adjacent ends have the same spot value.

matching game
A game in which players must play a tile, one end of which matches an open end of the tableau.

men
See tiles.

misdraw
To under- or overdraw the number of pieces to which you are entitled.

== O ==
off set

1. To be forced to draw when on set, thus going off set.

on set

1. To be first to play.
2. To be first in the order or play to go out.

open end
The end of a layout not connected to any other tile. Subsequently played tiles may only be placed on this end.

orphan
Seventh tile of a given suit left in a player's hand that cannot be played because all matching tiles have been covered.

overdraw
To draw more than the specified number of bones for one's hand or draw from the boneyard when able to play, which is normally illegal.

== P ==
pack
See domino set.

pale
See blank.

partie
A session of dominoes equivalent comprising a series of games.

partner
The person joined with a player in playing against his opponents.

pass
To forgo playing because one does not have a playable piece and is unable to draw. Also knocking or renouncing.

peg

1. The pin or marker used to score, usually on a cribbage board. Also spilikin.
2. To score e.g. "pegging five".

pieces
See tiles.

pigeon
A rookie player who loses easily.

pile
See boneyard.

pips
The dots on the face of a tile. Also spots.

point game
Domino game where players score points as they go and not at the end of a round as in block games or draw games.

pool

1. The stakes.
2. The dish or container for such stakes.
3. Alternative name for the boneyard.

pose
To play the first tile that begins the layout at the start of a hand. Also set.

president
The player in a position to go out first.

== R ==
renege
To fail to play when able and required by the rules of the game.

renounce
See pass.

repeater
A piece that will score the same as the previous play.

reserve
See boneyard.

revoke
To play the wrong suit.

rocks
See tiles.

round
Cycle of play during a game in which each player places a tile on the table, draws from the boneyard, passes or performs some other action when it is his turn. See also hand, game and match.

round game
Game in which every player plays for himself or herself.

row
A line of tiles placed face up and side to side on the table. See also train.

rubber
The best two of three games.

== S ==
scoring game
A game in which players score during play as well as at the end of a hand.

second set
The player who is in position to go out second.

set

1. To place a tile on the table.
2. The first tile of the hand played. Also lead.
3. A player who does not make his bid has been 'set'.

shake
See shuffle.

shuffle
To randomly rearrange or mix up the face-down tiles at the start of a round and before the players pick up their hands.

side

1. One of the two teams in a partnership game.
2. One of the two longer edges of a tile; as opposed to the two ends, the face or the back.

singles, singles domino, single domino
A tile with different ends i.e. not a doublet.

singles game
A two-hand game or a four-hand game not played in partnership.

sleeper
An undealt tile in a block domino game - a boneyard tile that cannot be drawn.

spilikin
A small peg of bone, wood, ivory, etc., used for taking the score at Cribbage and other games. Also peg.

spinner

1. The first double played during a game in e.g. Sniff or certain variants of All Fives.
2. A metal pin or nail head in the centre of a tile face that enables the tiles to be shuffled more readily.
3. A double that is usually turned at right angles to the line of play and enables arms to be developed from both ends as well as the open side. However, some games permit a double to be played inline or crosswise. It becomes a spinner once it has been played on opposite sides or ends.

spots
See pips.

star
A layout which has more than two open ends.

stock
See boneyard.

stone
See tile.

suit

1. All the tile halves of equal rank e.g. the fours, the sevens, etc.
2. The denomination of tile end.

== T ==
tableau

1. The array of face up tiles on the table upon which plays in the game are made. Also layout or table.
2. The arrangement of tiles, which may be face up and/or face down, in solitaire domino games.

tiles
The individual pieces of a domino set. Also bones, bricks, cards, men or rocks.

train
A line of tiles placed face up and end to end on the table.

tree
A layout in which every double may start a new branch.

Trey
The end of a tile with 3 pips.

trick
In bidding games, the set of tiles comprising one tile played by each player that is won by the player who played the winning tile.

trump, trumps, trump suit

1. The suit named by the winner of an auction in bidding games that automatically beats other tiles.
2. Alternative name for double.

== U ==
underdraw
A misdraw in which one draws too few tiles for one's hand.

== W ==
white
See blank.

widow
The remaining tile or tiles after players have drawn their hands. Usually used in bidding games instead of the term boneyard.

== Z ==
zero
See blank.

== See also ==
- List of domino games

== Literature ==
- The Standard Hoyle. New York: Excelsior. 1887.
- Armanino, Dominic C. (1959). Dominoes: Five-Up and Other Games Including Official Rules and Odds. New York: Van Rees.
- Armanino, Dominic C. (1977). Dominoes: Popular Games, Rules and Strategy. Cornerstone.
- Berkeley (1890). Dominoes and Solitaire. New York: Stokes.
- Berndt, Fredrick (1974). The Domino Book: Games, Solitaire, Puzzles. NY and Nashville: Thomas Nelson.
- Champlin, John Denison; Bostwick, Arthur Elmore (1899). The Young Folks Cyclopedia of Games and Sports. New York: H. Holt.
- Frey, Richard L.; Morehead, Albert H.; Mott-Smith, Geoffrey (1956). The New Complete Hoyle. New York: Garden City Books.
- Kelley, Jennifer A. (1999). Great Book of Domino Games. New York: Sterling.
- Wood, Clement; Goddard, Gloria (1940). The Complete Book of Games. Garden City: Doubleday.
