= Game of skill =

Game whose outcome is determined primarily through skill

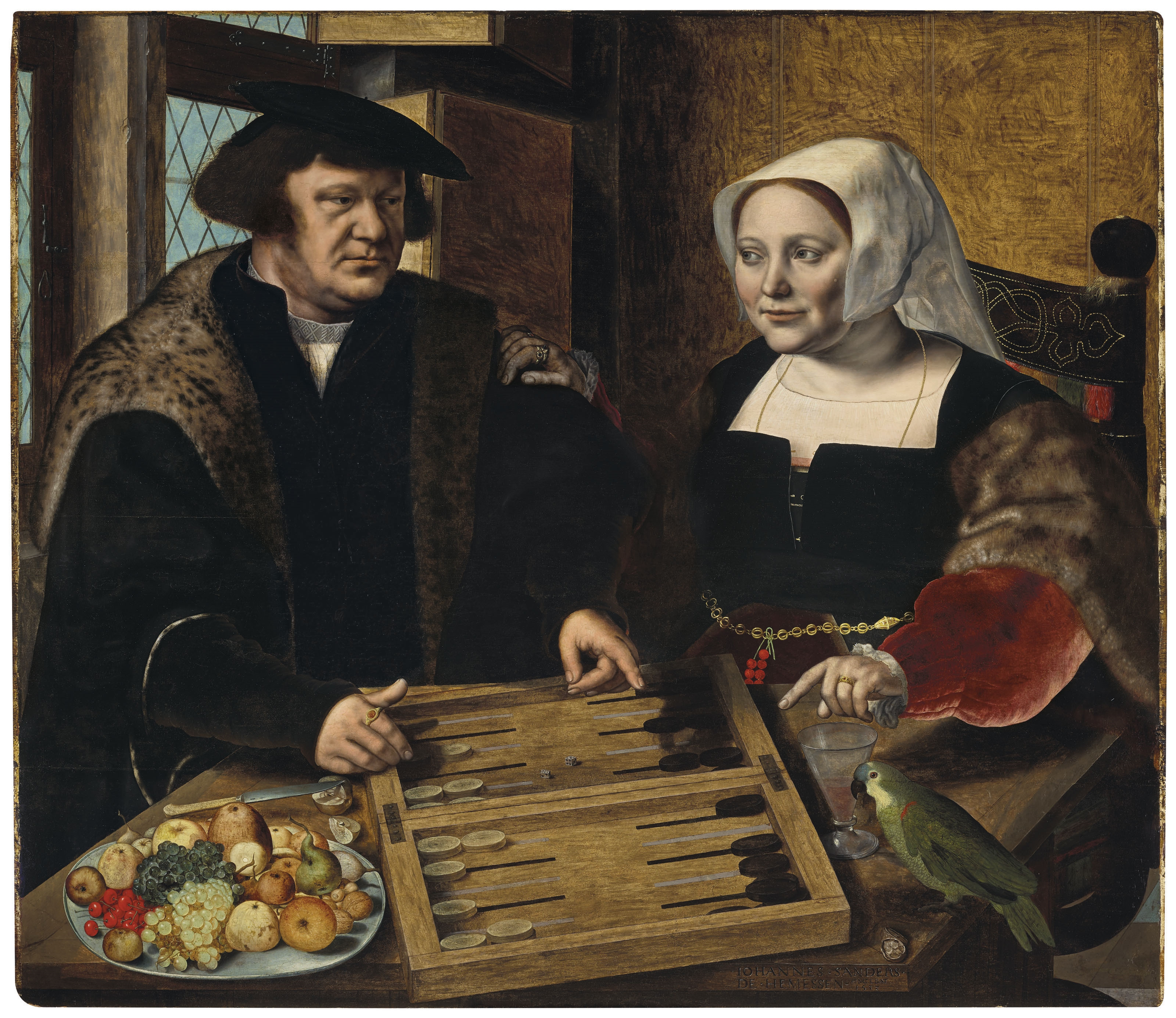
Backgammon is a game of skill. Strategy can give players advantages, but there is also an element of chance.

A game of skill is a game where the outcome is determined mainly by mental or physical skill, rather than chance.

Alternatively, a game of chance is one where its outcome is strongly influenced by some randomizing device, such as dice, spinning tops, playing cards, roulette wheels, or numbered balls drawn from a container.

While a game of chance may have some skill element to it, chance generally plays a greater role in determining its outcome. A game of skill may also have elements of chance, but skill plays a greater role in determining its outcome.

Some commonly played games of skill and chance include: poker, collectible card games, contract bridge, backgammon and mahjong.

Most games of skill also involve a degree of chance, due to natural aspects of the environment, a randomizing device (such as dice, playing cards or a coin flip), or guessing due to incomplete information. For many games where skill is a component alongside chance, such as card games like poker but also some physical games, the skills needed to play the game well include the calculation of mathematical probabilities and the application of game theory. Game theory often leads to tactics such as bluffing and other forms of deception.

== Legal meaning ==
The distinction between "chance" and "skill" has important legal implications in countries where games of chance are treated differently from games of skill. For instance, games of chance (such as lotteries) are often more heavily regulated by the state, if not prohibited altogether, in order to protect consumers from addiction issues. However, the legal distinction between games of skill and games of chance is often vague, and varies widely from one jurisdiction to the next.

In Germany, whether a game is considered of skill has legal implications with respect to whether wagers on the game's outcome are considered gambling or not. For example, poker is legally considered a game of chance in Germany (thus only allowed in casinos), whereas a tournament of skat is considered a game of skill and competitions with money prizes are allowed.

== Examples ==
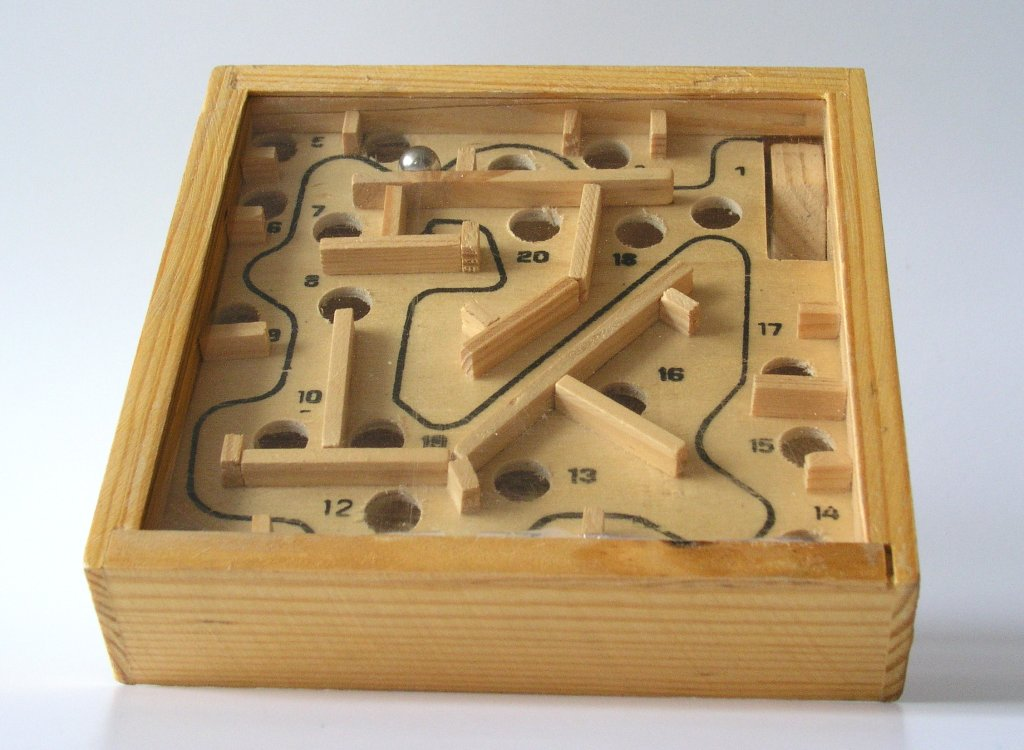
A ball-in-a-maze puzzle requires fine motor skills.

Boules (Boccia/Bowls/Pétanque); Carrom; Chess; Coconut shy; Cornhole; Crokinole; Darts; Egg-and-spoon race; Horseshoes; Hopscotch; House of cards; Kubb; Marbles; Mikado; Mölkky	Morabaraba; Musical chairs; Nagelbalken; Novuss; Penny football; Perplexus; Shove ha'penny; Shuffleboard; Sport stacking; Stone skimming; Stoßpudel; Table shuffleboard; Tag; Wire loop game

== Games of skill requiring special equipment (selection) ==
- Air hockey
- Billiards
- Operation
- Pinball machine
- Skee ball
- Snooker
- Table football
- Table ice hockey
- Whac-A-Mole

With the increasing spread of computer games, a lot of software of this genre was also created. Originally, these were mainly so-called jump'n'run games. However, the range has long since expanded and now also includes games with a greater strategic component, for example the various Tetris variants. In contrast to the non-virtual skill game, which usually involves the entire body, eye-hand coordination is required here. Encouraging player responsiveness and imagination is controversial. Nevertheless, various online skill games and jump'n'run adventures also find a place in child psychotherapeutic work.

== See also ==
- Casino game
- Game of chance
- Game of dares
- Mind sport
- Matching game
- Memory sport
- Strategy game
- List of types of games
- Esport
