= Muggins =

Domino game

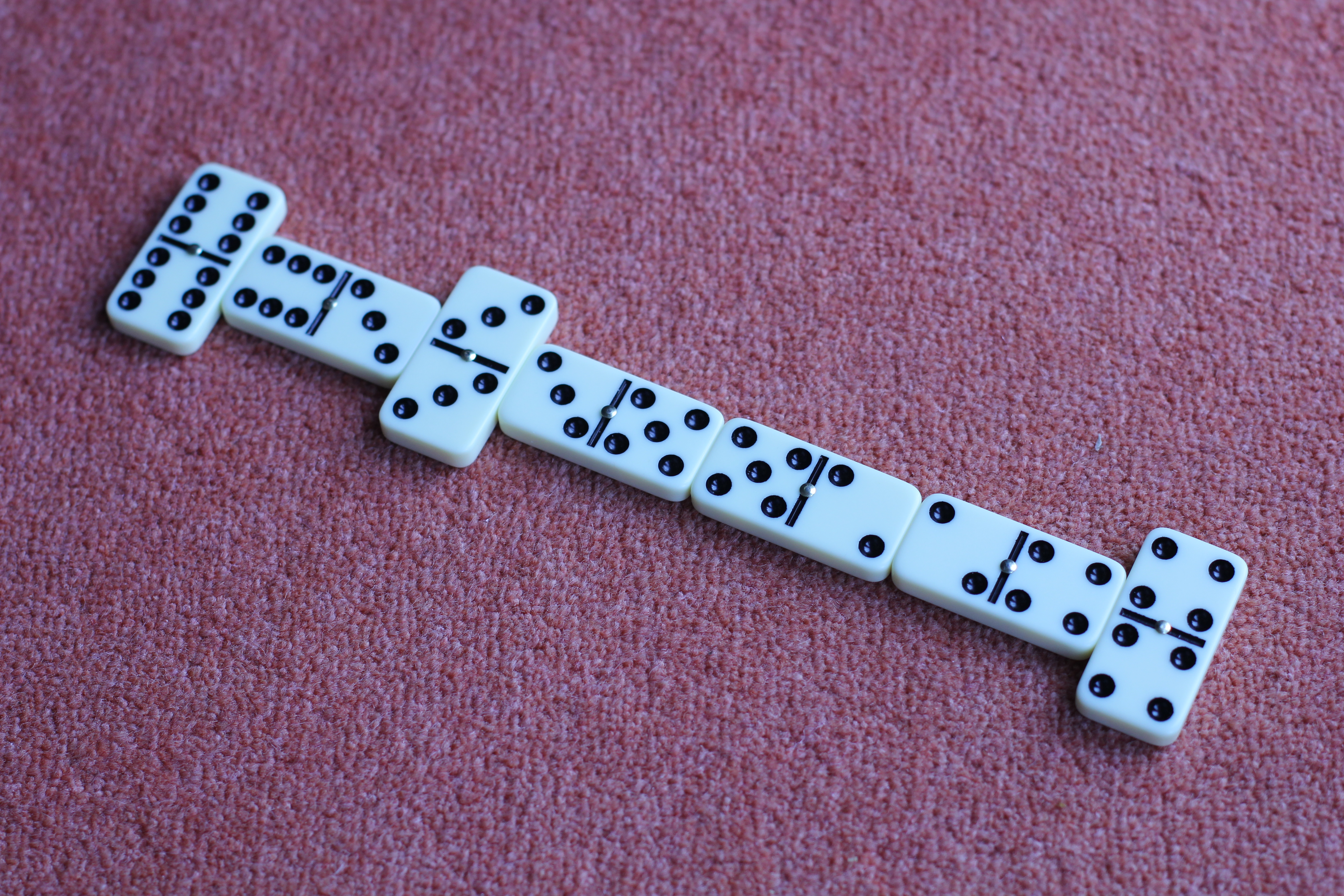
A game of Muggins in progress. The last player has just scored 20, the spot total on the open ends.

Muggins, sometimes also called All Fives, is a domino game played with any of the commonly available sets. Although suitable for up to four players, Muggins is described by John McLeod as "a good, quick two player game".

Muggins is part of the Fives family of domino games whose names differ according to how many spinners are in play. Muggins is the game without a spinner, Sniff and modern All Fives have a single spinner, and, in Five Up, all doubles are spinners. However, historically Fives or All Fives was the progenitor of the family and had no spinners.

Muggins is characterised by its 'fives' scoring system, the 'muggins rule' and the fact that there is no spinner. The aims of the game are to domino, i.e. be first to shed all one's hand tiles, and, during play, to score points by playing a tile that makes the total number of pips on all endpoints of the layout equal to a multiple of five.

== History ==
Dominoes were introduced to England from France towards the end of the 18th century, early forms of play being the Block Game and Draw Game. The rules for these games were reprinted, largely unchanged, for over half a century. In 1863, a new game variously described as All Fives, Fives or Cribbage Dominoes appeared for the first time in both English and American sources. This game borrowed the counting and scoring features of cribbage, but 5 domino spots instead of 15 card points became the basic scoring unit, worth 1 game point. The game was played to 31 and employed a cribbage board to keep score.

The following year, rules for a game called Muggins were first published in The American Hoyle. The cribbage board was dropped, 5 spots scored 5 points, and game was now 200 for two players and 150 for three or four. Despite the name, which is the same as a term used in cribbage to challenge a player who fails to declare his scoring combinations, no such 'muggins rule' was mentioned. (Note: The word muggins is used colloquially to mean "a fool or idiot (especially as an ironic way of referring to oneself)", hence the Cribbage term.) This omission was rectified in the 1868 edition of The Modern Pocket Hoyle, but reprints of both rule sets continued to be produced in parallel for around twenty years before the version with the muggins rule prevailed. From around 1871, however, the names of All Fives and Muggins, became conflated and many publications issued rules for Muggins or All Fives or Muggins or Fives without making any distinction between the two. This confusion continues to the present day with some publications equating the names and others describing All Fives as a separate game. Some modern descriptions of All Fives are quite different from the original, having lost much of their cribbage character and incorporating a single spinner, making it identical, or closely related, to Sniff. Most published rule sets for Muggins include the rule that gives the game its name, but some modern publications omit it even though the muggins rule has been described as the unique feature of this game.

At the end of the 19th century a new variant appeared in which the first doublet to be played became a spinner that was open four ways. In 1904, this game was first called Sniff and the name stuck. In the mid-19th century, another variant of the Fives family, Five Up or Five-Up, was created in the San Francisco area of the US that extended the role of spinner to every doublet played.

== Scoring ==
Points are earned when a player plays a tile (also called a domino or bone) with the result that the count (the sum of all open ends) is a multiple of five. The points earned are equal to the sum of the ends. Therefore, if a player plays a tile that makes the sum of the ends 5, 10, 15 or 20, the player scores that number. All pips on a crosswise double are included in the count until both sides are played on.

== Play ==
Each player takes five tiles, when playing with four players or more, or seven when playing with two or three. The remainder are pushed aside to form the boneyard. The starting play is determined either by who holds the heaviest (highest) double (or single, if no one has a double) and that person plays first. If it is a 6-4 (🁟), double-five (🁙), 5-0 (🁔), 4-1 (🁎), or 3-2 (🁈), the initial count is evenly divisible by five and so the player scores. Players in turn then lay a matching tile on one of the endpoints. Doubles are played crosswise and singles are played off its sides. Each player must play if holding a domino matching an end. A player who cannot match must draw until obtaining a playable tile or the boneyard is exhausted.

The muggins rule, which gives the game its name, is that a player must announce the count when playing a tile that scores a multiple of five; if he or she fails to do so and an opponent calls "Muggins!", the score is forfeited. Most accounts of the rules state the requirement to announce the count, but not all mention that the opponent may call "Muggins!" or that the points are forfeited. Some rules allow the calling opponent to claim the points for themselves.

The player who goes out wins additional points based on the value of dominoes still in other players' hands, which is scored by counting all the pips on those dominoes. Each opponent's hand is rounded to the nearest multiple of five; for example, the winner scores 25 for 27 pips in an opponent's hand and 30 for 28 points. These points are summed and awarded to the winner. If all players are blocked, the lightest hand (hand with fewest pips) wins, still earning points based on the pips in opponents' hands, usually subtracting the winner's pip count from the total.

== Strategy ==
Muggins allows for complex dominoes strategy. Because players can score either by making the ends add up to a multiple of five, or by being the first to get rid of all their dominoes, players must balance the need to score throughout the hand with the need to get rid of their difficult dominoes. Players must use deductive reasoning to learn from each move their opponent makes. For instance, if a player could have scored 20 points by playing the double-four (🁑) on one turn, their opponent can reasonably assume that their opponent does not have this domino. Champion dominoes players are able to identify these insights, combine them with other information, and remember them throughout the hand.

== Variations ==
All early versions of Muggins were played with a double-six set. Modern variants differ in the number of tiles taken initially; the use of double-six, -nine, -twelve, or -fifteen sets; whether the initial tile must be a double. Modern rules sometimes admit the feature of the first double becoming a single spinner, but this variant is more commonly known as Sniff.

A common variation is knocking; when a player cannot lay a tile, they have the option to "knock"; this conditionally skips the next player. If the player after the skipped player can score, they must do so, and play then continues as normal. If they cannot, even if they can play, that player knocks and play reverts to the player who knocked first, who must draw until they can find a playable domino, and then the player who would have been skipped is allowed to play. This is common in a partnership form of the game played with four players; a knocking player thus defers to their partner who might be able to score. It is considered cheating for one partner to signal the other that they should knock.

== Related games ==
The original All Fives, also known as Cribbage Dominoes or simply as Fives, was described in 1863 and was a precursor to Muggins. It was played with a double-six set, although one description uses double-nine dominoes, and players scored one point for every five pips scored as well as 1 or 5 points for winning. Scoring used a cribbage board. It was recorded as recently as 1981. There are at least two modern versions of All Fives that are quite different from one another and from classic All Fives. One is a single spinner game like Sniff, except that the spinner can only be placed crosswise and does not count once both sides are played on. Usually only 5 tiles are dealt to each player even in the two-hand game. The second game has no spinner and is essentially the Tiddly-Wink version of Fives in which players may play a second tile after playing any double or scoring tile. However, they may not go out by playing such a tile. (Note: See, for example, Berndt (1974) or Brandreth (1981).)

=== Sniff ===
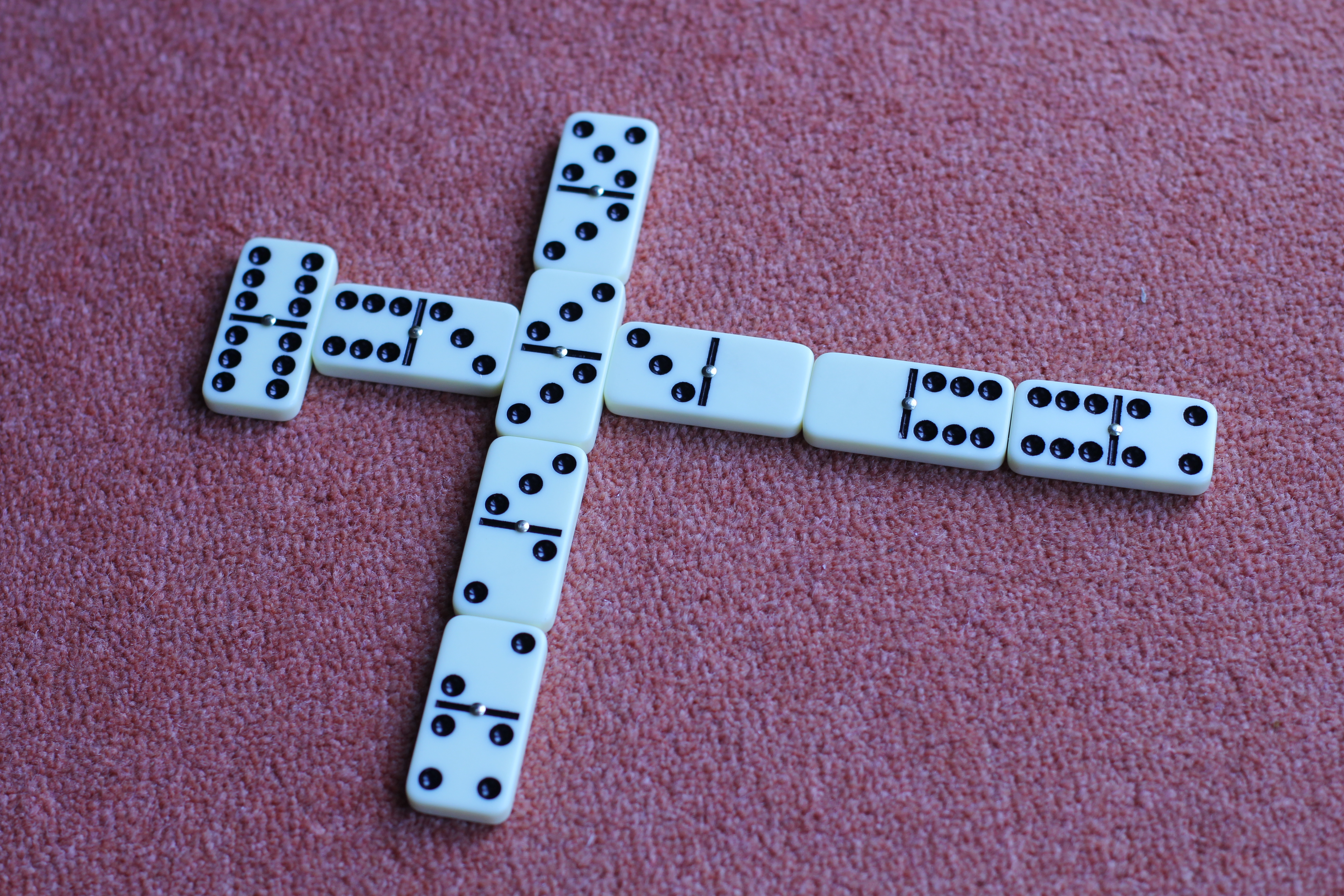
A game of Sniff in progress. The sniff is the double-three (🁻) and is the only spinner. The last player has just scored 25.

Sniff is Muggins, usually without the muggins rule, but with a single spinner, known as the sniff. The first doublet played automatically becomes the sniff and may be played four ways. Rules vary as to whether the first play must be a doublet and hence the sniff; whether the sniff can be played endwise, crosswise, or both; whether the ends of a crosswise sniff continue to score before being covered by a matching tile; or whether the arms of a crosswise stub may be extended by one or more tiles.

When the game first appeared around 1900, the rule was simple: the sniff was played crosswise; any open end still counted and there was no limit on the length of the arms. By convention, the sniff must be played on both sides before the ends may be played on; or, if played inline, it must be played on both ends before the sides may be played on. Only then does it become a spinner.

=== All Threes ===
All Threes is played in the same manner as Muggins, except that points are earned for multiples of three.

=== Fives and Threes ===
Fives and Threes emerged in the early 20th century and is a popular league and pub game in Britain today.

It is similar to Muggins and All Threes, but points are scored for multiples of five and multiples of three at the open ends. Multiples of five and multiples of three are worth one point each. They can be scored in combination, however. If Player A plays the 5-6 (🁚) and Player B the 6-1 (🁜), then Player B scores 2 points because 5 and 1 sum to six (two threes). Player A then plays the 1-5 (🀽) and earns 2 points because 5 and 5 sum to 10 (two fives). If Player B then plays the double-five (🂋) crosswise, Player B scores 8 points, 5 for five threes and 3 for three fives. Fives and Threes is sometimes played with a spinner. Games are usually played to 31, 61, or 121 points using a cribbage board.

=== Odd Primes ===
Odd Primes, a variant invented by G.P. Jellis, is played similarly to Fives and Threes except the scores are also counted for multiples of higher prime numbers, 7, 11, 13, 17 and so on. For the bonus score at the end of the hand, the player who finished the hand receives points equal to tile with the most pips in competitors' hands, rounded down to the nearest prime number.

=== Five Up ===
Five Up (or Five-Up in the US) is a further development of Sniff that features every double as a spinner. It was invented in the mid-19th century in the San Francisco area.

== See also ==
- Glossary of domino terms

== Bibliography ==
- How to Play Draughts, Backgammon, Dominoes and Minor Games at Cards. London: Stevens. 1863.
- Brandreth, Gyles (1981). Everyman's Indoor Games. London, Melbourne, Toronto: Dent.
- Dick, Wm Brisbane (1868). The Modern Pocket Hoyle: Containing All the Games of Skill and Chance as played in this country at the present time (4th ed.). New York: Dick & Fitzgerald.
- Foster, Robert Frederick (1897). Foster's Complete Hoyle (3rd ed.). New York and London: Frederick. A. Stokes.
- Hoyle, Edmond (1803). Hoyle's Games, Improved: Consisting of Practical Treatises on Whist ... [etc.] : with an Essay on Game Cocks and the Rules &c. at Horse Races : Wherein are Comprised Calculations for Betting Upon Equal Or Advantageous Terms. R. Baldwin.
- Hoyle, Edmond (1859). Hoyle's Games: Improved and Enlarged by New and Practical Treatises, with the Mathematical Analysis of the Chances of the Most Fashionable Games of the Day, Forming an Easy and Scientific Guide to the Gaming Table, and the Most Popular Sports of the Field. Longman and Company.
- Kelley, Jennifer A.; Lugo, Miguel (2003). The Little Giant Book of Dominoes. New York: Sterling.
- Kingsland, Florence (1904). The Book of Indoor and Outdoor Games. Doubleday.
- "Trumps" (1864). The American Hoyle. New York: Dick & Fitzgerald.
