= Kristof Magnusson =

Icelandic-German novelist and translator

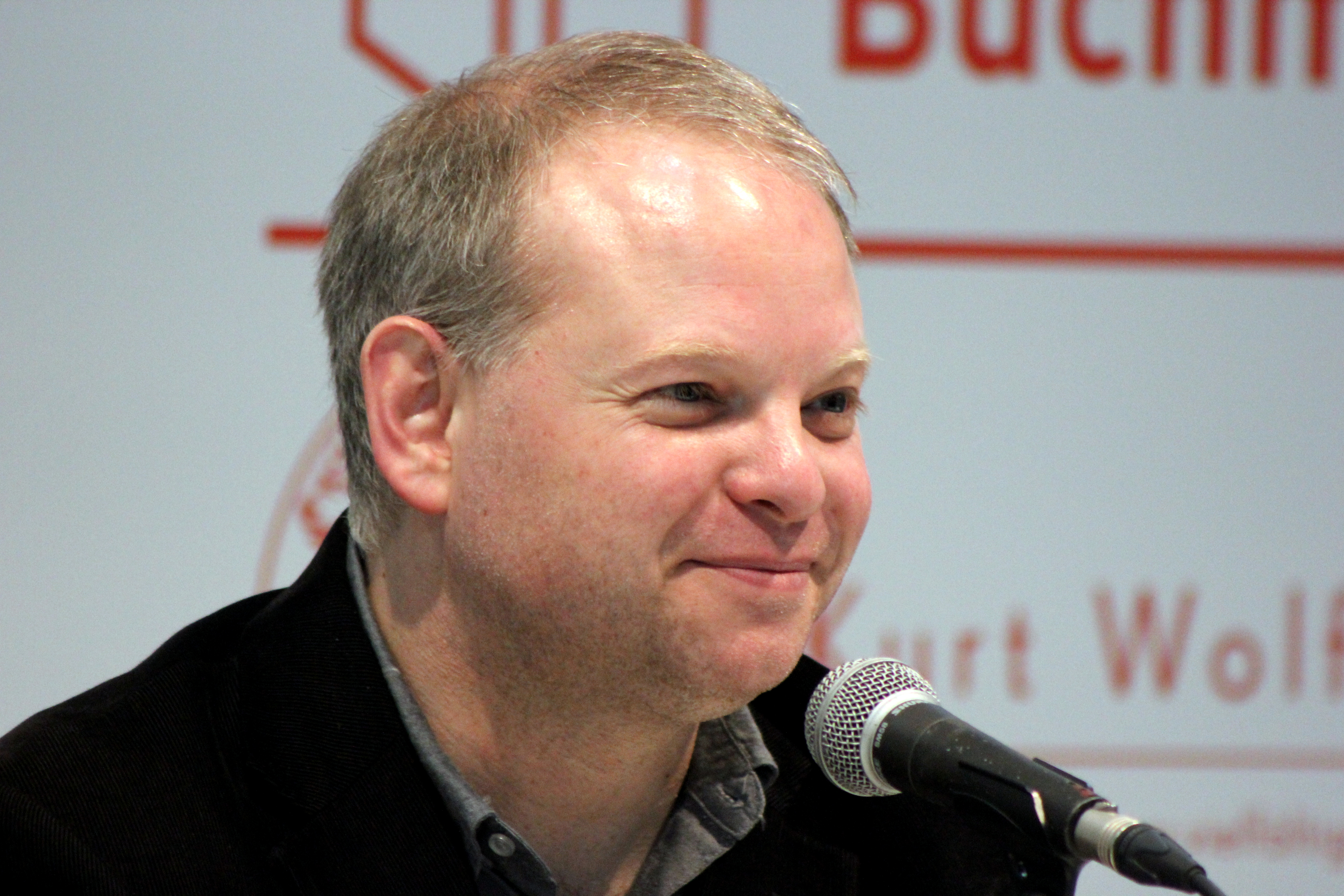
Kristof Magnusson, Leipzig Book Fair 2015

Kristof Magnusson (born Kristof Weitemeier-Magnusson; 4 March 1976 in Hamburg) is an Icelandic-German novelist and translator. He lives in Berlin.

After his training as a church musician he studied literary and scenic writing in Leipzig and Berlin as well as Icelandic literature in Reykjavík. His works include not only novels and plays but also short stories and reportages in both German and foreign newspapers. In 2008, The Financial Times published his article Inflation will pay on the causes of the Icelandic financial crisis. Furthermore, he translated numerous Icelandic publications into German. In 2013, Magnusson was writer-in-residence at Queen Mary University of London; in 2014 at Massachusetts Institute of Technology (MIT).

With the success of his comedy Männerhort (2002) about a men’s crèche he became known to a wider audience. The play has been staged in over 80 theatres across Germany and abroad. Amongst other languages, the play was translated into English (Men's Daycare). In 2005 Magnusson published his first novel Zuhause (At home). Both his debut and his second novel Das war ich nicht (It wasn’t me), described as “a fast-paced, cleverly crafted, genuinely funny and enjoyable read“, have been translated into several languages. His most recent novel Arztroman (Doctors. A novel) was published in 2014 and attracted plenty of media attention.

The general style of his works can be characterised as comical and entertaining with a certain lightness. “Kristof’s novels fall into the category of literary fiction, but demonstrate more humour than this genre typically offers“, says Steph Morris after a long conversation with Magnusson in spring 2015, during which the author provided information on several aspects of his oeuvre, including his extensive researches that allow him to gather substantial detailed knowledge about the different living environments he describes in his books.

In 2016/2017, Kristof Magnusson took part in the project "Frankfurt, Deine Geschichte. Literatur in einfacher Sprache" ("Frankfurt, your history. Literature in simple German") initiated by the Frankfurt Literature House, the Historic Museum Frankfurt and the Administrative Department for Inclusion of the City of Frankfurt. Six authors, alongside Magnusson Henning Ahrens, Mirko Bonné, Nora Bossong, Olga Grjasnowa und Alissa Walser, wrote texts about Frankfurt’s history in simple German and developed a set of rules for this purpose. In an article about the project, Magnusson wrote in the Frankfurter Allgemeine Zeitung concerning the impact of the set of rules: “The rules for simple language, which seem to expel any literaricity from a text, suddenly – now that a group of authors has framed them before writing – appear as an artistic manifest that turns minimalism into a virtue.“ He spoke for “putting a greater effort in searching for fields in which we can usefully reduce barriers. Then we will realize that simple language can enrich us: As a chance for a fairer society, as an invitation for thinking about language, for artistic experiment, for playing.“ Asked about topics and language of his texts in simple German, Magnusson stated: “I take a different approach to topics when I know I want to tell them in easy German. For instance, I decided to write about the murder of Rosemarie Nitribitt, a Frankfurt prostitute in the 1950s. That is a really interesting story, and it is easy to tell. It’s about sex and violence; everyone gets that. (...) I try to tell a story in a simple way, usually from just one perspective, and not using too much reflection, and then I figure out what to write instead. Motives played a large role (...). (...) Working with simple language is interesting. Aspects emerge that you might otherwise never have thought of.“
