= List of game genres =

This list contains types of games.

== Main types ==
- Chance games
- Skill games

=== Party games ===
- Conversation games
- Drinking games
- Guessing games
- Power games
- Singing games

=== Tabletop games ===
- Board games
  - Amerigame
  - Cooperative games
  - Eurogames
- Card games
  - Deck-building games
- Dice games
- Miniature games
- Pencil-and-paper games
- Role-playing games
- Strategy games
- Tile-based games

=== Video games ===
==== Technology ====
- Alternate reality game
- Arcade games
- Console games
- Handheld console games
- Handheld electronic game
- Mobile games
- PC games

==== Generation/type ====
- Action games
  - Platforming games
  - shooter games
    - First-person shooters
    - Third person shooter games
    - Hero shooters
    - Shoot 'em ups
  - fighting games
    - Beat 'em up
      - Hack and slash
  - Stealth game
  - Survival game
  - Rhythm game
  - Battle royale game
- Action-adventure games
  - Survival horror
  - Metroidvania
- Adventure games
  - Text-based adventure games
  - Point-and-click adventure games
  - Visual novel
  - Interactive movie
  - Real-time 3D adventures
- Puzzle video games
  - Breakout clone game (?)
  - Logical game
  - Physics game
  - programming game
  - Puzzle-platform game
  - Trial-and-error / exploration
  - Hidden object game
  - Reveal the picture game
  - Tile-matching video game
  - Traditional puzzle game
- Role-playing video game
  - Action role-playing game
  - Computer role-playing games
  - Massively multiplayer online role-playing game
    - MMORPG
    - MMOFPS
    - MMORTS
    - MMOTBS
    - MMO simulation games
  - Roguelike
  - Tactical role-playing game
  - sandbox role-playing game
  - First-person party-based RPG
  - Monster-taming game
- Simulation video game
  - Construction and management simulation
    - city-building games
    - Business simulation games
    - government simulation game
  - Life simulation game
  - Vehicle simulation game
    - Flight simulation
    - Racing games
    - Space flight simulator games
    - Train simulators
    - Vehicular combat
- Strategy video game
  - 4X game
  - Artillery game
  - Multiplayer online battle arena
  - Real-time strategy
  - Real-time tactics
  - Tower defense
  - Turn-based strategy
  - Turn-based tactics
  - Wargame (video games)
  - Grand strategy wargame
- Sports video game
  - Racing games
  - Sports games
  - Competitive
  - Sports-based fighting
- Other notable genres
  - Board game or card game
  - Parental Sim
  - Casino game
  - Digital collectible card game
  - digital therapeutic video game
  - Gacha game
  - Horror game
  - Incremental game
  - Party games
  - photography game
  - social deduction game
  - Trivia games
  - typing game
  - Browser games
  - Casual games
  - Escape room games
  - Minigames

== By location ==
- Car games
- Lawn games
- Locative games
- Parlor games
- Pervasive games
- Playground games

== Others ==
- Educational games
- Mathematical games
- Multiplayer games
- Play-by-mail games
- Play-by-post games
- Puzzles
- Quizzes
- Redemption games
- Wargames
- Word game
