= Men's parking space =

Parking space reserved for men

Coordinates: 48.1301°N 8.2310°E

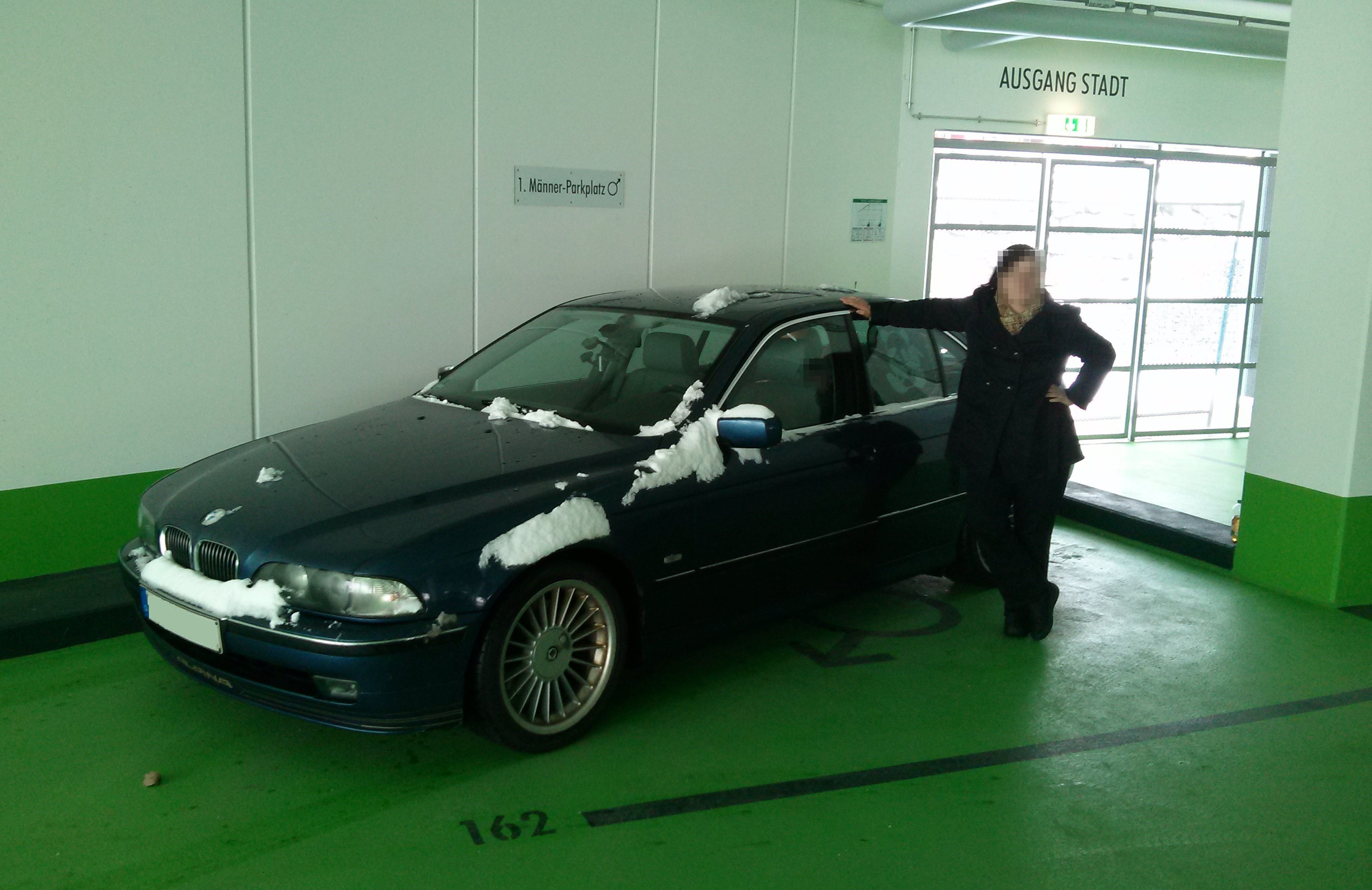
Woman parking on men's parking space (Männer-Parkplatz sign behind vehicle) in Triberg

Men's parking space is an antonym to women's parking space.

Normally mentioned only in satire, in July 2012 two men's parking spaces were opened in Triberg in the Black Forest of Germany. Planned as a practical joke presenting a specific challenge to unskilled drivers, they produced worldwide media interest in the combination of humour to lampoon the idea of political correctness and of successful city marketing.

== Technical and local background ==
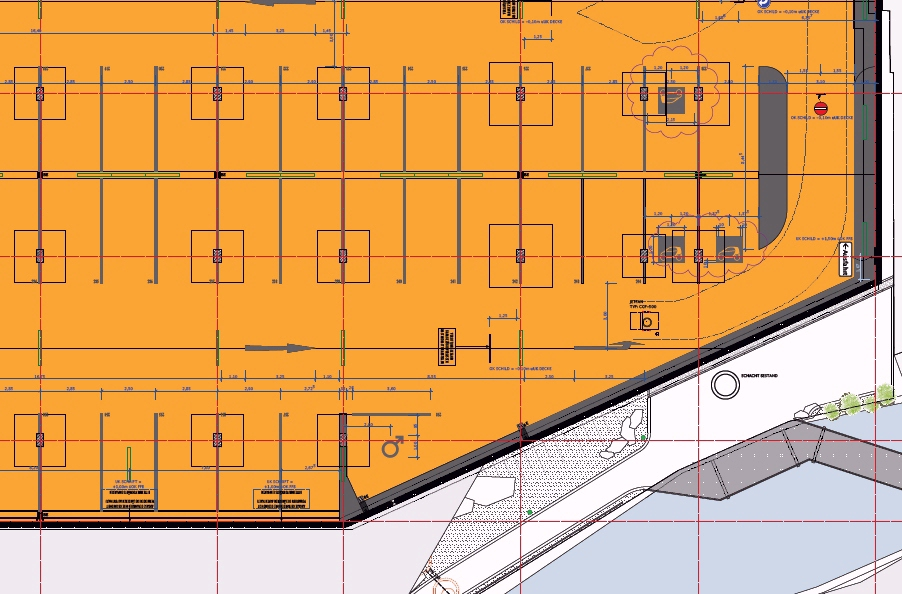
Plan of a level of the parking garage, men's parking slot with Mars symbol

Triberg, a small city of five thousand inhabitants, has an extremely steep topography. It has waterfalls. In 2010, Triberg was reportedly visited by about 250,000 tourists per year, most of whom came to see the waterfalls on a day-tour basis. After the 9/11 attacks, Americans, who had been frequent visitors, became less likely to visit. That and the decline of the local watchmaking industry have caused problems for Triberg's economy.

In 2007 Max-Dieter Mack presented preliminary plans for a €90 million amusement park, Erlebniswelt Triberg, on a former industrial site in the municipality. Mack, an architect, is a Triberg native and relative of leisure park mogul Roland Mack. The parking garage at Kreuzstraße is the only planned building constructed so far. Mack was not commissioned for this. Instead of the theme park, a smaller shopping mall and some comparably humble attractions are now on schedule. The back of the parking garage is angled to follow the course of the River Gutach. Therefore, two parking bays, one on each level, have a peculiar shape and can be reached only by a complicated parking maneuver. Mayor Strobel and the architects, Judith Haas and Mattias Huismanns, deliberated about excluding those two bays from the garage of 220 bays, which was built for €2 million.

Strobel decided to declare them men's parking spaces. Per the state garage regulations in force in Baden-Wuerttemberg, ten per cent of all stalls (numbering twelve and of the standard shape and size) had to be declared for women in any event, but their misuse by men is not punishable according to the StVO (the federal Straßenverkehrs-Ordnung, or Highway Code of Germany). Accordingly, the only recourse available to property owners is to eject the misuser for trespassing or to tow his (or her) car; the operator of this particular garage (i.e. the government of the city of Triberg) declines to take either of these actions and instead appeals to the honour system in the case of the women's spaces and to the skill of the driver, whatsoever his or her sex, for the 'men's'.

== General background ==
According to Ruth Becker's research about risk zones in town planning, women have more to fear in personal surroundings and at home, while men are the object (and dominantly subject) of attacks in the outside world. Becker refers to U.S. author Elizabeth Wilson's Sphinx in the city and assume that women overestimate the dangers of urban surroundings. Herbert Glasauer doubts that women's parking spaces have a positive effect, and sees them as a sort of backlash perpetuating a damsel in distress perspective instead of addressing actual violence.

Men's parking spaces, as in the Triberg example, are for the brave and ask their users to cope with risk, darkness, wilderness, and skill. Even before the Triberg controversy, for example, German satirist Florian Willet demanded in 2011 that the riskiest places in garages to be reserved for "real men". An American reporter in Utah noted that an American mayor attempting to set up a men's parking space would face greater legal risk compared to Strobel.

== Follow-up ==
The dedication, planned as a practical joke and a way to alert unskilled drivers to the specific challenge of the two parking slots, attracted worldwide media coverage.

US television networks, including ABC and NBC News, reported the story. Becky Bratu, a news journalist with NBC News, suggested that Mayor Gallus Strobel had increased the threshold for drivers to attract more tourists. NBC News quoted Mayor Strobel's interview with Süddeutsche Zeitung to challenge political correctness, and his hope the tight spaces would be an attraction for ambitious drivers.

Mayor Strobel had media contacts and interviews with French, English, Italian, and South African media. Le Figaro quoted Strobel as stating "Une ville touristique se doit de faire parler d'elle" ("A tourist town has to make people talk about it").

The Huffington Post reported: "A town in southwest Germany has drawn accusations of sexism after designating two particularly tricky parking spaces "men only". The Associated Press was on site. The Daily Telegraph in UK, a women's magazine in Morocco, and Norway's Aftenposten also reported.

Times of India reporter Kritika Kapoor wrote an article on the issue. She quoted Strobel about his secretary's failure to park on the slot, saying "Five times she tried and no success", and inviting women to stand for the challenge. "Women can come here and prove me wrong, and while they're at it, they can see the town's attractions." Kapoor pointed out that Triberg's introduction of gendered parking is not the first example of sexist parking spots.

=== Regional feedback ===
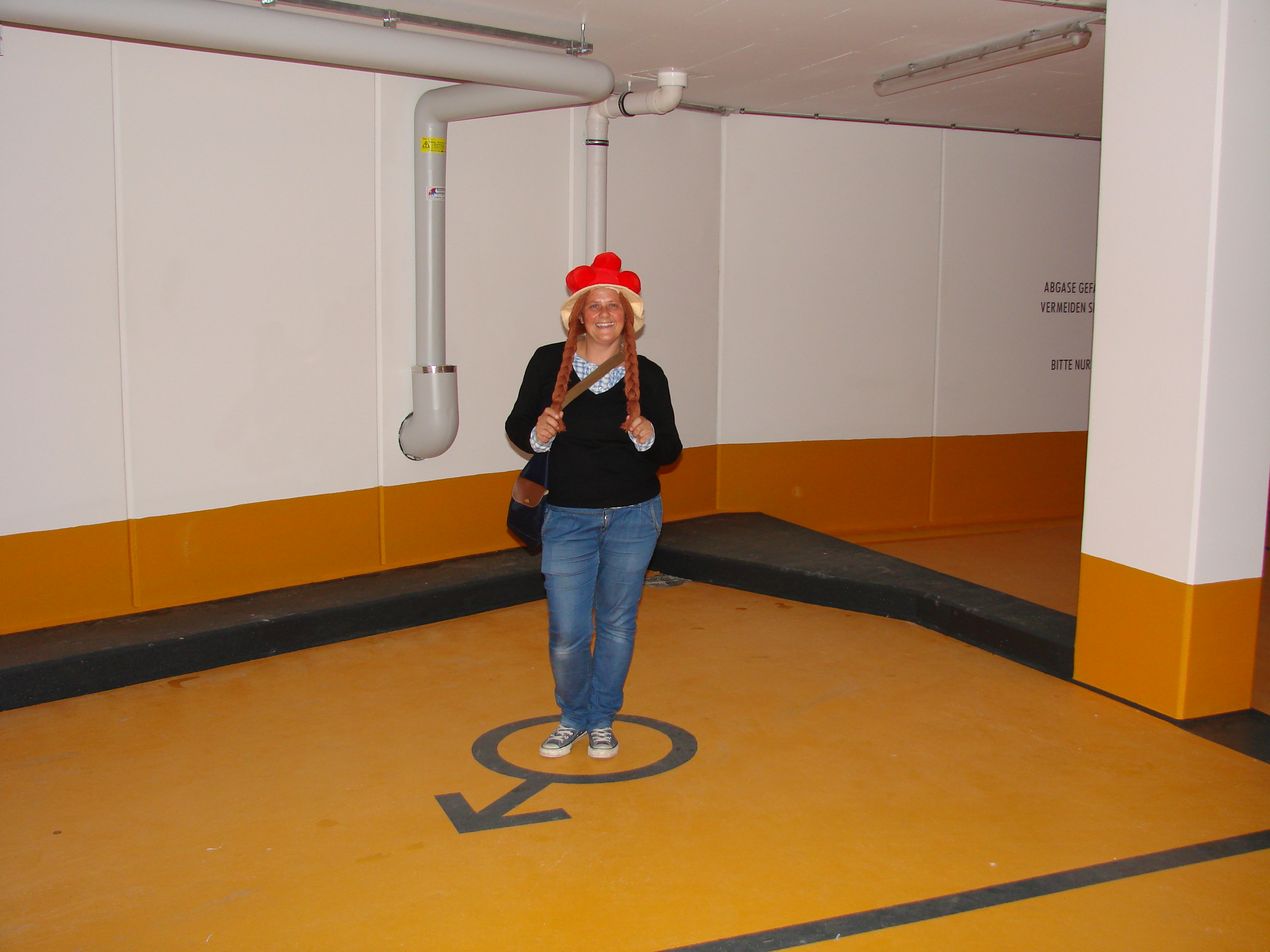
A lady with a traditional Black Forest hat occupies the spot

The Greens' youth association of Ortenau wrote an open letter against the parking spots and gender equality official Anette Klaas of the neighboring Waldshut-Tiengen district criticized them as "a foolhardy provocation".

Strobel, who has a legal background and holds a PhD in the history of law, countered that the critics were being humourless and described the dedication as usage of a cliché for city marketing. Dieter Stein, a writer living in Triberg, published a humorous booklet about the story. The men's parking slots are included in city tours, and Triberg also sells merchandising articles.

The gender-based parking has been featured in annual TV retrospectives in Germany and South Africa. In 2013, Gallus Strobel was a guest on several television programmes, and the local carnival association baptized and tested the parking lots. The number of tourists and visitors to Triberg increased to almost 400,000 in 2012, compared to 250,000 annually before. Neighboring St. Georgen came up with a temporary men's parking place, in the sense of a place where men are being parked (Männergarten).
