= Matching game =

Game requiring players to match similar elements

Matching games are games that require players to match similar elements. Participants need to find a match for a word, picture, tile or card. For example, students place 30 word cards; composed of 15 pairs, face down in random order. Each person turns over two cards at a time, with the goal of turning over a matching pair, by using their memory.

== Examples ==
Type of game that may involve matching include:

- Dominoes
- Board games such as mahjong solitaire
- Card games such as Concentration or rummy
- Tile-matching video games

== Types of matching ==
Most matching games are objective, with correct answers in the rules for what counts as a match, pair, etc. Some however, like Dixit or Apples to Apples, are about subjective matches picked by one or more judge players. Here the correlation between a match holds value only as other players decide it, but rules dictate who will make those decisions and when.

== Matching card games ==
In card games of the matching group, players play cards in turn to a wastepile or tableau according to certain rules. A player unable to play a card by the rules is usually penalised by having to draw one or more extra cards, the aim usually being to shed all one's cards. There are three main sub-groups of matching card games:

- Stops Group. Cards are played in ascending sequence, often in suit
- Eights Group. Cards are played to a single pile, matching the previous card in suit or rank.
- Layout Group. Cards are added to a tableau or layout or moved around it in accordance with the rules.
