= Hammerschlagen =

Game of driving nails into a wooden beam

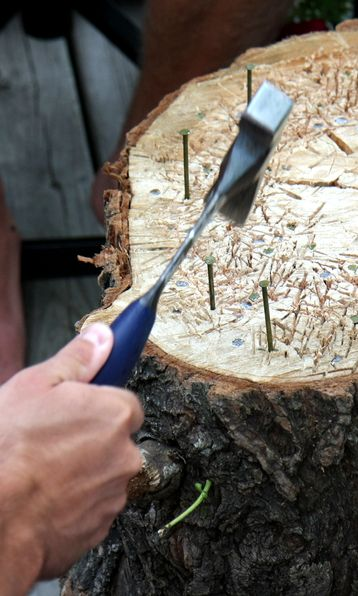
- Hammer driving nails into the wood stump
- Other names: Nagelbalken, Stump, Nagelspiele
- Players: 2+
- Setup time: Minimal
- Playing time: 10-20 minutes
- Chance: Low

Hammerschlagen (also called Stump or Nagelbalken [German lit. 'nail beam']), is a game in which participants compete against each other to drive nails into a wooden beam. To make challenging, players must use the narrow, pointed side of the hammer rather than the traditional flat face.

The most common form is as a competition between several individuals, the winner receiving a prize. It can also be played as a competitive solo game.

== Origins ==
According to Florian Dering, a museologist at the Munich Stadtmuseum, the nail beam game as folk amusement has been around since the 1920s. This driving of nails into dimensional lumber has been used by showmen and charities to raise money, and also at weddings to have the newly married couple show their skills to the audience.

Dering reports a series of administrative regulations: the vertical cross-section of the plank should be at least 12 by 12 centimetres (4.7 by 4.7 in), and have no knots or protruding branches. Several hammers are used, each having a mass of at least 400 grams (14 oz) and a handle length of at least 30 centimetres (12 in). The nails provided should have a round (but not smooth) head, and be at least two inches long. The nail bar is usually mounted at table height and secured to sawhorses by way of screw clamps.

WRB Inc. claims the owner of Gasthaus Bavarian Hunter in Saint Paul, Carl Schoene, invented the game, with his father-in-law, Mike Wlaschin, coining the Hammerschlagen name. In 1999, Wlaschin founded WRB which trademarked the name Hammer-Schlagen and the game design trade dress. While company acknowledges iterations of the nail-driving game existed prior to Schoene, they have used their trademark to take legal action on restaurants and bars and other businesses that fail to sign licensing agreements with the company.

== Hammerschlagen today ==
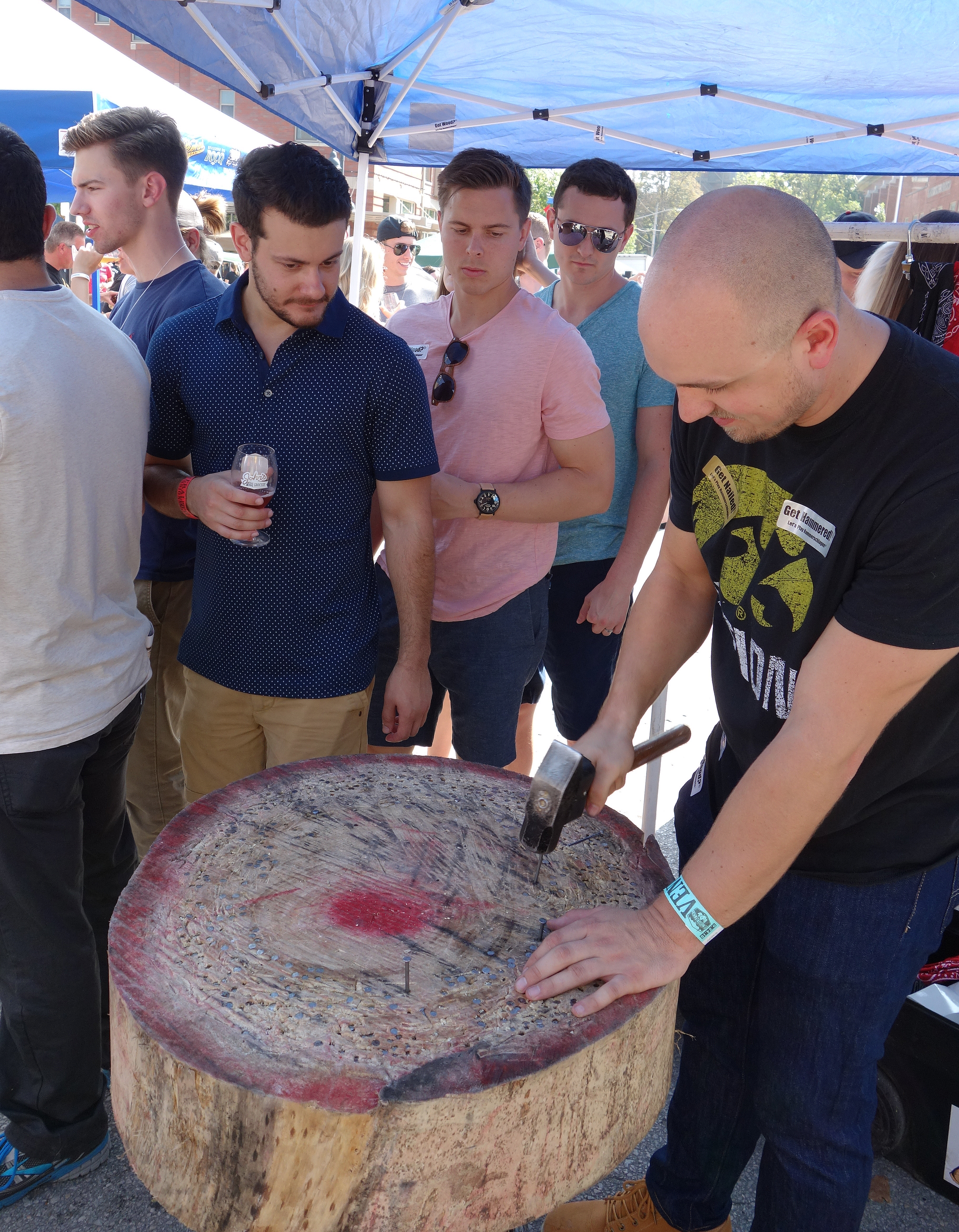
Man playing hammerschlagen at Oktoberfest 2016 in Iowa City

=== United States ===
In the United States, the game is often played while consuming beer and is associated with tailgate parties, German cultural events and Oktoberfest celebrations, and beer festivals in the Upper Midwest. Commonly, a tree trunk is used in place of the wooden beam.

=== Germany ===
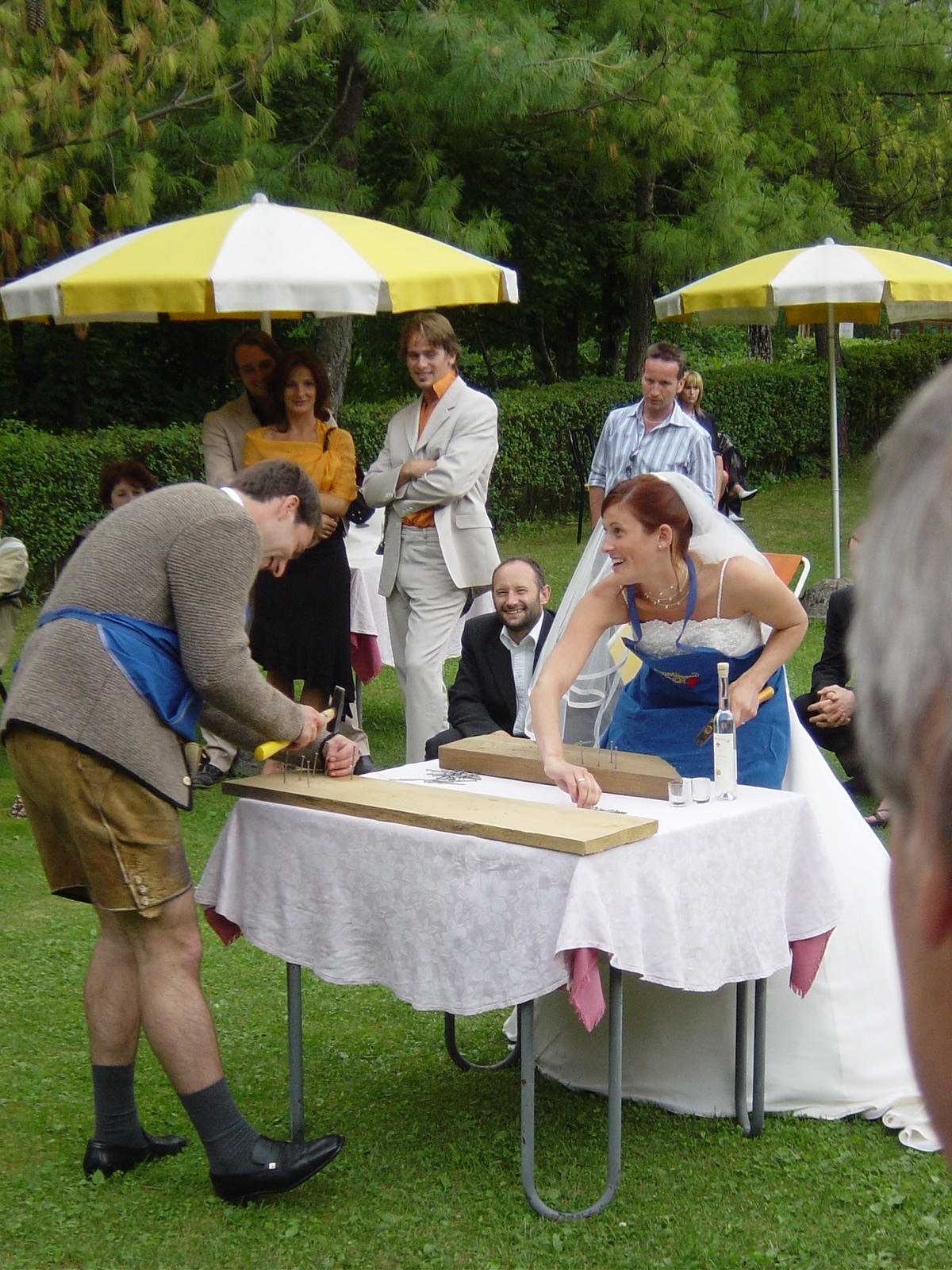
Competitive nailing during a wedding

It can be found as a game of leisure at events and festivals, often for children and as a wedding custom.

For Expo 2000, the Bundesanstalt für Arbeitsschutz und Arbeitsmedizin in Dortmund presented the Exhibition Of The Labor World to demonstrate different aspects of workplace security. A hammerschlagen area was provided to demonstrate a person's physical competence. Among many other things at the exhibition, the "Living And Working World" area in which the nail bar appeared dealt with the intellectual, psychological, physical, and social competence of people, which was implemented scenographically in four so-called "elementary spaces": four cubic, monomaterially formed spaces that were meant to arouse the senses by way of light, sounds, artistic ciphers, and smells.

== See also ==
- Stock im Eisen, an art piece that was used as fund-raising tool during the First World War. For a fee, a single nail could be partially driven into the figure. When completed, the figure would be transformed from wood to metal.
