= List of domino games =

The following is a partial list of games played with domino tiles or similar equipment. The most typical domino games are layout games, i.e. games in which the players add matching tiles from their hand to a layout or tableau in the middle of the table. These can be either blocking games, in which the object is to empty one's hand; scoring games, in which the players can score during the game by creating certain configurations; or trick and trump games which draw inspiration from card games. Likewise there are also domino-like card games, e.g., Sevens and the once very popular Pope Joan.

== Layout games ==
=== Blocking games ===
==== Block game ====
Block or "the Block game" for two players is the simplest basic domino variant and gives its name to the whole family of 'block games'. It requires a double-six set, from which each player must draw seven tiles; the remainder is not used. The first player sets a tile on the table which starts the line of play. The players alternately extend it with one matching tile at one of its two ends. A player who cannot do this passes. The game ends when one player dominoes by playing their last tile, thus winning the hand, or when the game is blocked because neither player can play. A winner who has dominoed, scores the total remaining pip count of the loser's hand. The winner of a blocked game is the player with the lower pip count, who scores the difference of the pip counts.

There are also variants for four players.

==== Chickenfoot ====
Chickenfoot is a modern game related to the Cyprus family which begins with a spinner which is played four or six ways. Every subsequent double becomes another spinner that must be played a further three ways in the shape of a chicken foot before any other open ends of the tableau may be played.

Example:
		🀴
🀸	🁣	🀳
		🀵

==== Cyprus ====
Cyprus is a variant of Sebastopol, but played by 4–10 players with a double-nine set. It is best described as a variant of the Draw game. Most, in some variants all, tiles are drawn by the players. The layout starts with a double, and the next eight tiles played must be attached to it, so that the layout is a star with eight open ends. The game proceeds like the Draw game, except that a player who cannot play need not draw more than once.

Example Layout: (double nine set not available in Unicode)
🀰	🁢	🀰
🀰	🀰	🀰
🀰	🁢	🀰

==== Draw Game ====
Draw or "the Draw Game" is one of the two basic forms of the game of dominoes, the other being "the Block Game," and "most characteristic domino games are elaborations of it." It gives its name to the family of 'draw games'. Initially each player draws seven tiles from a double-six set. The first player places a tile on the table which starts the line of play. The players alternately extend it with one matching tile at one of its two ends. The main difference from the block game is that players who cannot play must draw tiles until they find one which can be played or the stock consists of exactly two tiles. The pip count of the remaining stock (at least two tiles) is added to the losing player's remaining pip count to form the score of the game.

==== Maltese Cross ====
Maltese Cross is a variant of Sebastopol for 2–4 players. Like Sebastopol, it uses a double-six set. Each player draws 5 tiles (7 tiles in the case of two players). As in Cyprus, a player who cannot play must draw one tile and may play it if possible. Once the central spinner and the four adjacent tiles have been played, the next four tiles to be played must be doubles, which are turned crosswise to form the likeness of a Maltese cross, but do not act as spinners.

Example:
		🁉
		🁸
🁫	🀸	🀱	🀳	🁳
		🁧
		🁑

==== Matador ====
Matador or Russian Dominoes is another blocking game whose unique feature is that, in playing a piece, players must ensure the ends add up to seven, as opposed to the usual rule whereby the ends are simply matched. Since blanks cannot be matched in this way, the game has four matadors (Note: The term may have derived from card games, such as the once universally popular Ombre, in which the top cards are called matadors.) which may be played at any time, but especially when the open end of the tableau is a blank.

==== Mexican Train ====
This member of the trains family of games, similar to the basic version of trains but with an additional 'Mexican train', is played mainly in the United States. It is typically played by at least four players using at least a double-twelve set.

The game starts with a double in the middle of the table, acting as a spinner from which the players' "private trains" branch off. An additional 'Mexican train', initially of length zero, also starts from the central spinner.

Unless the tile played is a double, only one tile can be played per turn. Tiles must normally be played to the player's own train or the Mexican train. A player who cannot play must draw a tile and play that; if the stock is empty or the tile drawn cannot be played, the player must pass and mark their own train as public, allowing other players to use it like their own train and the Mexican train. The train becomes private again as soon as the owner adds a tile to it.

Some variations of the game have special rules for the first round, and additional rules to ensure that doubles at the end of trains are 'satisfied' as quickly as possible.

Mexican Train can be regarded as a synthesis of the Trains and Cyprus families of games, with the addition of the Mexican train.

==== Sebastopol ====
Sebastopol is best described as a four-player variant of the block game. The game starts with a double in the middle, from which the line of play takes off in four directions. The next four tiles played must be attached to this central spinner.

Example:
	🁸
🀸	🀱	🀳
	🁧

==== Spinner ====
This game, developed by James F. and Edna Graham, is played with a standard double-nine set plus eleven additional tiles representing combinations of the standard values 0–9 with an additional "spinner" symbol and the double "spinner". A "spinner" matches any other value (similar to a wild card).

Each player draws 14 (two players) or 7 (three to eight players) tiles. Play starts with the double 9, or with the double "spinner" to replace it. The second and third tile played must match with a 9 or a "spinner". Whenever a double is played later in the game, it serves as a spinner in the ordinary sense, and the line of play cannot be continued elsewhere before there are tiles on all four sides of the double. A player who cannot play must draw a tile from the stock and may play it immediately if it matches. The second game starts with the double 8, the third game with a double 7, and so on down to the double 0.

==== Tiddly-Wink ====
This is an old English game, variously spelt Tiddley-Wink, Tiddly-Wink and Tiddle-a-Wink. It is the Block Game with the additional rule that playing a double entitles the player to another play.

==== Trains ====
The games of the trains family are typically played between four to ten players with double-nine or double-twelve sets.

In the basic version of the game, the number of tiles that each player draws initially depends on the number of players and the size of the set. If one player does not have a double, the tiles are shuffled again. In the first round each player plays a double to start a private line of play, known as a train. In subsequent rounds, players first add a tile to their own train or pass if they cannot do this. A player who did not pass can also add at most one tile each to each of the other players' trains. A player who empties their hand wins the game and scores 120 points plus 5 points for each tile that remains in an opposing players' hands.

Example:
Train 1: 🀱🀲
Train 2: 🀹🀺
Train 3: 🁁🁂
Train 4: 🁉🁊

=== Scoring games ===
==== Bergen ====
This is a variant of the Draw game in which scoring happens mostly during the game. There are no spinners, so that the line of play does not branch. Players score 2 points by playing a tile that makes the same value appear at both ends of the line of play, and 3 points if moreover there is a double at one end. Another 2 are scored by the player who empties their hand and ends the game, or by the player who is determined (by variable and sometimes complicated rules) to be the winner of a blocked game.

A variant in which the line of play must start with a double, which acts as a spinner, is known as Double Bergen.

==== Muggins ====
Muggins, one of several games also known as All Fives, is a variant of the Draw game in which, in addition to the scoring at the end of the game, players can score in each move if the total pip count of the endpoints of the line of play is divisible by 5. Muggins was originally distinguished from classic All Fives by the addition of the 'muggins rule', whereby if a player failed to announce his score as he played his tile, or if he miscounted, his opponent could cry "Muggins!" and the points were forfeited as in cribbage. Moreover, classic All Fives uses a cribbage board for scoring and the pip count is divided by five to get the game points. So a score of 10 pips is worth 2 points.

In the variant of Sniff, the first double is a spinner called the sniff which is open on all four sides; in the variant of Five Up, all doubles can be used as spinners, from which lines of play branch. In yet another variant, All Threes, players score if the total pip count of the endpoints is divisible by 3, in Fives and Threes they score if it is divisible by 3 or 5. There are two versions of modern All Fives both of which employ Muggins scoring: one with a single spinner like Sniff which, however, must be played crosswise and does not count once both sides are played to, and one with no spinner, but the Tiddly-Wink rule that a player who plays a double may play another piece immediately after it.

==== 5s and 3s ====
5s and 3s is a skillful version of dominoes played in pairs or fours and used in competitions and in leagues. The aim is to be the first player to exactly reach a set number of points in a round, often 61. Each player has a hand of dominoes and play proceeds as normal dominoes by matching an open end. The total number of pips at the open ends (with doubles counting twice) are used to decide if a player scores points. One point is scored for each time this total is exactly divisible by either 5 or 3. So if the play started double-six (🁡) it would score 4 points as 12/3 is exactly 4. If the next player played a six-three (🂐) then the maximum is scored for a single turn of 15 for 8 points (5 for the 3s and 3 for the 5s). If the next player were to play one-six (🁰) the total would be 4 and they would score no points.

== Trick and trump games ==
=== 42 ===
42, also known as Texas 42, is a trick-taking game played with a standard set of double-six dominoes. The rules are similar to the card game of Spades. Originally invented in Texas, it is often referred to as the "national game of Texas".

=== Bingo ===
This trick-taking game for two players using a double-six set is similar to Sixty-Six and Bezique. To begin, each player draws 7 tiles from a shuffled boneyard or stock and then a tile is turned face up, the higher of its two values determines the trump suit. The value of a blank-side is 7, not 0. So, the ranking for the 'six suit' is 6-6, 6-0, 6-5, 6-4, 6-3, 6-2, 6-1; if the four suit were trump the 6-4 would be in the trump suit (four) only.

The winner of a trick is determined as follows. Double-zero (🀱, the bingo) beats everything else, the double of trumps beats all other trumps, and trumps beat all non-trumps except the bingo. If both tiles are non-trumps, and of the same 'suit'(one end of each tile the same) one simply compares their total pip counts; if of differing 'suits' lead beats.

In the first phase of the game each trick is followed by both players drawing a tile from the stock. As soon as the stock is exhausted or one player "closes the game" by announcing that they will score at least 70 points, the players stop drawing. From this point on the second player in each trick is obliged to follow suit as follows: Whenever possible, a trump must be answered by a trump, and a non-trump by a tile that matches its higher end if possible, or otherwise its lower end.

Scoring in this game is relatively complicated; the round winner accumulates 70 points. Players, during play, can declare/show doubles in hand for points, after winning tricks If a player holds sets of two or more doubles; values respectively are 20 for two doubles, 30 for three, 50 for four doubles, 60 for five, 70 for six doubles; players cannot 'build' on previously declared doubles. If the first player to lead has all six doubles they win the equivalent of three games; four doubles or more automatically wins the round if the 0-0 is one of them: 50 (4 doubles) + 10 (ending round) + 14 (double 0)= 72 points. If a player holds both the double-0 and the double-trump when they aren't the same they also will win the round: 2 doubles (20 points) + bingo (10 pts) + double-0 (14 pts) + trump-double (28 pts) = 72 pts since the two doubles beat any trick they are played. Domino points for scoring: bingo = 14 pts, trump-double = 28 pts, trump-non-doubles and other non-trump-doubles = sum of all pips, 6-4 and 3-0 =10 pts each.

=== Double Fives ===
This trick-taking game can be played by two or three players with a double-five set (obtained from a double-six set by removing the seven tiles showing a 6) or by four players with a full double-six set. After shuffling, each player draws 8 tiles (four-player variant: 6 tiles).

The first player can play any tile from their hand. Each of the other players adds another tile to the trick; if possible it must have one value in common with the lead tile. Among those tiles for which the higher value is the same as the higher value of the lead tile, the one with the highest pip count takes the trick. Each four in a trick scores one point for the player who takes it.

== Fishing games ==
=== Concentration ===
This adaptation of the Concentration card game is generally played by two players. The tiles are placed face down on the table, shuffled and then arranged in a simple rectangular grid.

The goal is to collect the largest number of pairs of tiles. With double-six dominoes, pairs consist of any two tiles whose pips sum to 12. For example, the three-five (🁋) and the zero-four (🀵) form a pair. In some variations, doubles can only form pairs with other doubles so that the double-two (🁁), for example, can only be paired with the double-four (🁑) but this presents a problem with the double-three (🁉) being unpairable.

Players, in turn, try to collect pairs by turning over and exposing the faces of two tiles from the grid. If the four values of the two sum to 12, the player takes the two tiles, scores a point (in some rules a point for each tile taken), and plays again. If the tally is any other number, the bones are turned face down again and the player's turn is over.

The first player to accumulate 50 (or 100) points wins the series.

== Proprietary games ==
There are a number of domino-like games that use proprietary tiles.

=== Bendomino ===
This proprietary variation of the standard draw game was created by Thierry Denoual. It is played with a double-six domino set which is standard except that every tile is bent into a 120-degree curve, so that three tiles can be assembled into a circle. This allows either end of the line of play to be blocked or both ends to connect.

=== Rivers, Roads & Rails ===
This transportation-themed variation of the Draw game uses 140 square tiles. A small number of tiles allow the line of play to branch. Due to 90-degree curves the line of play can also get blocked in one or more directions.

== See also ==
- Glossary of domino terms
- List of card games by number of cards
- List of dice games

== Bibliography ==
- Morehead, Albert H.; Frey, Richard L.; Mott-Smith, Geoffrey (1991). The New Complete Hoyle Revised. rev. by Richard L. Frey, Tom Smith, Phillip Alder and Matt Klam. London, New York, Toronto, Sydney and Auckland: Doubleday. ISBN 0-385-24962-4.
- Spadaccini, Stephanie (2005). The Big Book of Rules. New York: Penguin. ISBN 9780452286443.
