= Women's parking space =

Parking space reserved for women

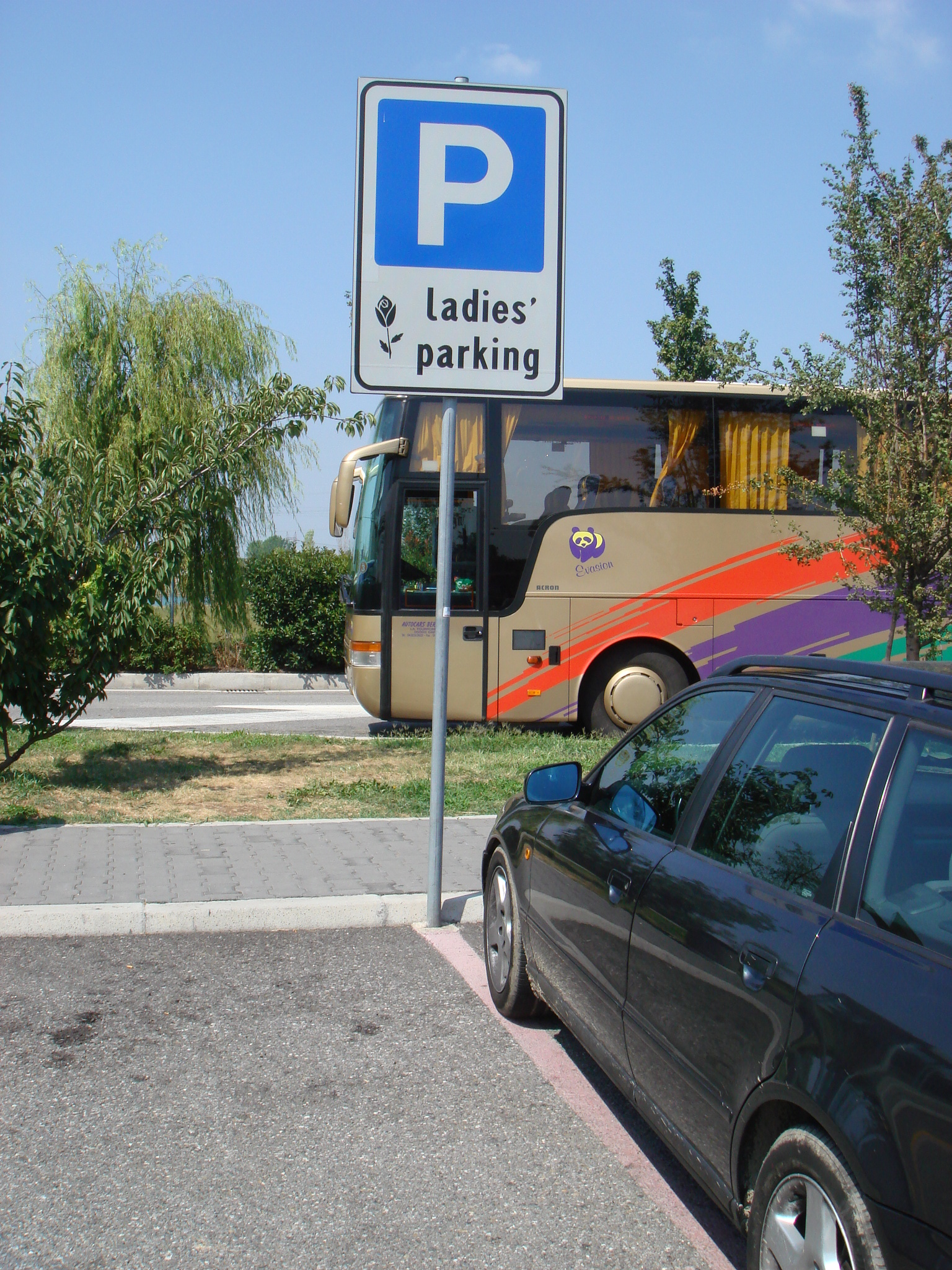
Women's parking space in an Italian rest area

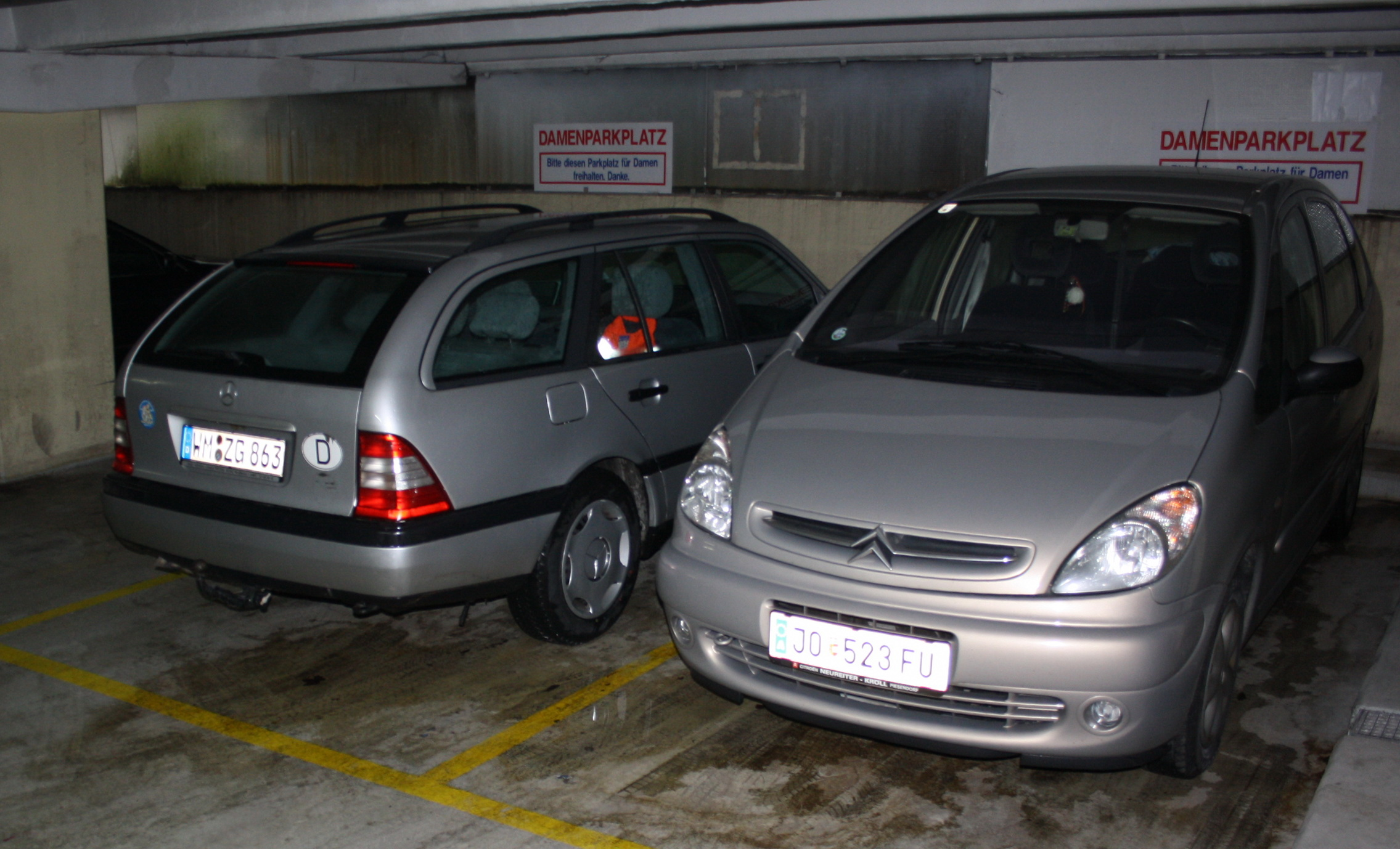
Women's parking space in an Austrian garage

Women's parking spaces are only in certain cities globally. They are specially designated and identified parking spaces in parking garages and parking lots to be used by women. They are usually much larger than normal parking spots to reduce accidents and near exits to increase the safety of women, to facilitate parking, or to facilitate walking to shopping or employment destinations.

To improve women's safety, some companies have improved lighting in their garage, installed surveillance systems, and have reserved parking spots closer to entrances for female-only parking. Some parking spots are painted bright pink to distinguish them as female only, and may also have a "female only" sign. Some women's parking facilities are also widened to make maneuvering in and out with children easier.

== History ==
Women's parking spaces were originally introduced in 1990 in Germany to improve women's safety and reduce the risk of sexual assault. This was formulated because women felt at risk in parking garages which were often dark and deserted. After Germany, places like South Korea and China also adopted this policy. It soon became a law in some regions of Germany that at least 30% of parking spots must be reserved for women.

A study by the US Bureau of Justice Statistics showed that 7.3% of violent crimes occurred in parking garages.

== By country ==
=== Germany ===
In contrast to disabled parking spaces, women's parking spaces are not designated in the German road traffic code (Straßenverkehrs-Ordnung) and are therefore only legally binding in private parking areas. However, as landlord, the operator of the parking facility can insist that these spaces be used only by women as long as it is not claimed that the parking facility falls under the rules of the federal road traffic code.

In some German states, women's parking spaces are provided for under garage regulations. For example, the garage regulations of North Rhine-Westphalia and Schleswig-Holstein state that women's parking places:

- must be marked as such
- should be near the facility entrance
- must be monitored by a security guard or by video surveillance
- must be near an installed burglar alarm

In the garage regulation of Baden-Württemberg, at least 10% of all spaces in large garages must be reserved for women. The garage regulation of Brandenburg stipulates that at least 30% of spaces must be for women.

The German Federal Anti-Discrimination Agency stated on their website that the establishment of women's parking spaces does not violate the General Equal Treatment Act (Allgemeines Gleichbehandlungsgesetz), because women are more likely than men to be victims of sexual abuse.

According to the Hessian State Office of Criminal Investigation, the furnishing of women's parking spaces is an ideal means of raising women's feelings of safety. However, according to federal criminal statistics published by the German police, molestation and attacks on women occur no more often in parking garages than in other places. In Hesse, in 2003, only one of 1000 crimes in parking garages was sexual in nature.

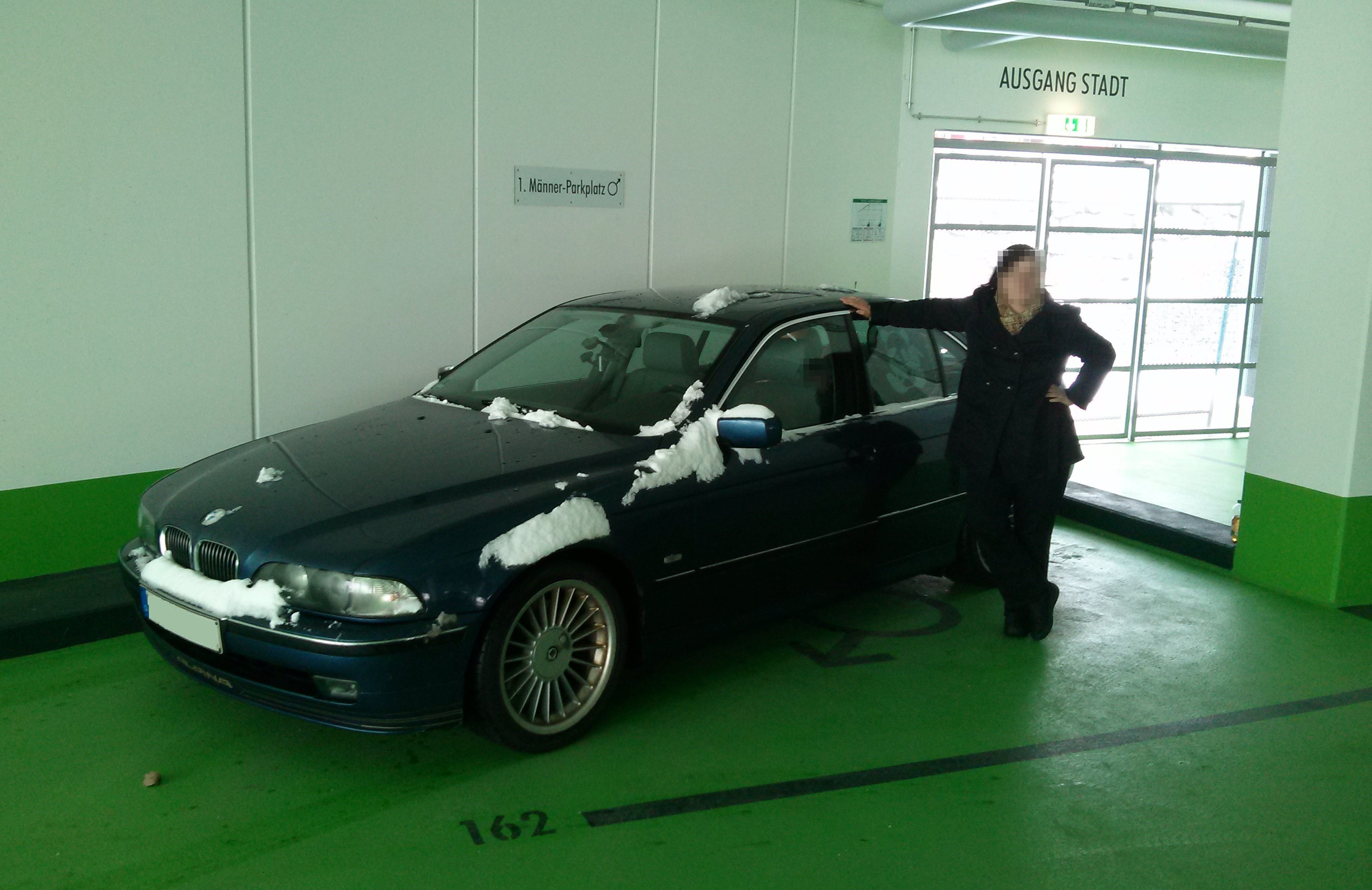
Woman parking on men's parking space in Triberg

A small town in southern Germany, Triberg introduced the antonym, the globally first men's parking spaces in 2012 and caused a major media hype. The two Triberg slots are based on a technical peculiarity, since the slots in question are much more difficult to maneuver into than normal spaces. The mayor of Triberg even explained that women would have difficulty parking there since the spaces require male drivers to back in diagonally without crashing into walls and a pillar. In fact, the mayor's exact words were, "But many also cannot park, like my secretary. Five times she tried and no success." On a final note, to add a comical touch, these men-only parking spaces were even marked with "Mars" symbols.

==== Background ====
According to Ruth Becker's research about risk zones in town planning, neither men's nor women's risk assessments are in line with actual dangers, and the actual zone of risk is different for each gender. Women have more to fear in personal surroundings and at home, while men are objects (and dominantly subjects) of attack in the outside world. Becker refers to Elizabeth Wilson's book Sphinx in the City and assumes that women overestimate the dangers of urban surroundings. The focus on opening public spaces and areas to women (at least in Europe) is counterproductive. Herbert Glasauer doubts that women's parking lots have a positive effect, and sees them rather as a sort of backlash, perpetuating a view of the "damsel in distress" instead of addressing actual violence.

=== China ===
In the Chinese province of Hebei, women's parking spaces have been established in shopping centers. These are wider and are clearly marked in different colors. This was made to ease parking for women, according to the representative of one shopping center. In the Wonder Mall in Hebei, one of three underground lots is designated for women. The spaces are between 3.2 and 3.3 meters wide, so that even when car doors are fully open, they do not touch neighboring cars, a measure intended to reduce the number of collisions.

While other countries seem to use these spots to create a safe environment for women, there has been controversy across the media in regards to sexism, since China is the only country that has made these spots significantly bigger. At the Wonder Mall in Hebei, there is an entire parking garage reserved for women, which contains spaces that were 80 centimeters larger than regular parking spaces. If women have trouble parking in the significantly bigger lots, there are dancing parking-lot employees designated to park the cars for them. The walls in the women-only parking garage are designed with the 12 animals of the Chinese zodiac/horoscope as a precaution for female drivers who can remember a picture better than a parking space number.

=== South Korea ===
In 2009, the city government of Seoul painted 4,929 parking spaces pink so that women do not have to walk as far to their destination and make the city more conducive to wearing high heels.

To the public, these parking spaces are known as "she-spots." They are bordered with hot pink outlines and display the traditional woman logo (as seen in public bathrooms) which are marked with pink skirts as well. Their intentions are not to degrade women, but to add a "feminine touch" to the city. In fact, The Korea Times (2014) announced the $700 million, 4-year attempt to make the cities more female-friendly. Along with the female-only parking spaces, other ideas include adding thousands of new women-only toilets, and resurfacing city sidewalks with a soft material to ease tired feet for those wearing high heels.

Likewise in Europe, these spaces are placed near entrances and exits in dark parking garages or lots. In addition, along with the beliefs of other European countries who use female-only parking, Korea explains that with the new construction of a female-friendly environment their intentions are not to leave men out and only benefit women, but to create a safe environment for everyone.

=== Indonesia ===
Some shopping malls in Jakarta, Surabaya, Bandung, and other cities have women's parking space:

- Pondok Indah Mall
- Plaza Senayan
- Ciputra Town Square

== Criticism ==
Women took offense to the fact that their designated parking spots were made larger because they thought it implied that women were bad drivers. Men also took offense to this because women get special treatment while men do not. The men argued that it was discriminatory to make larger parking spaces available for inexperienced female drivers but none for inexperienced male drivers considering women and men both have to take the same exam to receive a driver's license. They felt this went against gender equality. Another issue arose when a town in Germany labeled two parking spots as reserved for men based on the sole fact that they were harder to maneuver into, further backing up the claims that men were being discriminated against for their driving skills.

On the other hand, some feminists did not take to the fact that the spots were painted pink, much less that a woman wearing a pink mini skirt was also painted on the spot. They considered this very sexist and demeaning toward women, while others just considered it a symbol that was known worldwide.

In response to the controversy, government officials said that women received the closer parking spots so they did not have to walk as far with kids. It was also said that the parking spots were made larger so women can have more room to take the kids out of their vehicles. Men argued back that this implied that only women can be caretakers.

== See also ==
- Men's parking space
- Sex segregation
- Women's rights
- Men's rights
- Women-only space
