= Game of chance =

Game whose outcome is determined by random events

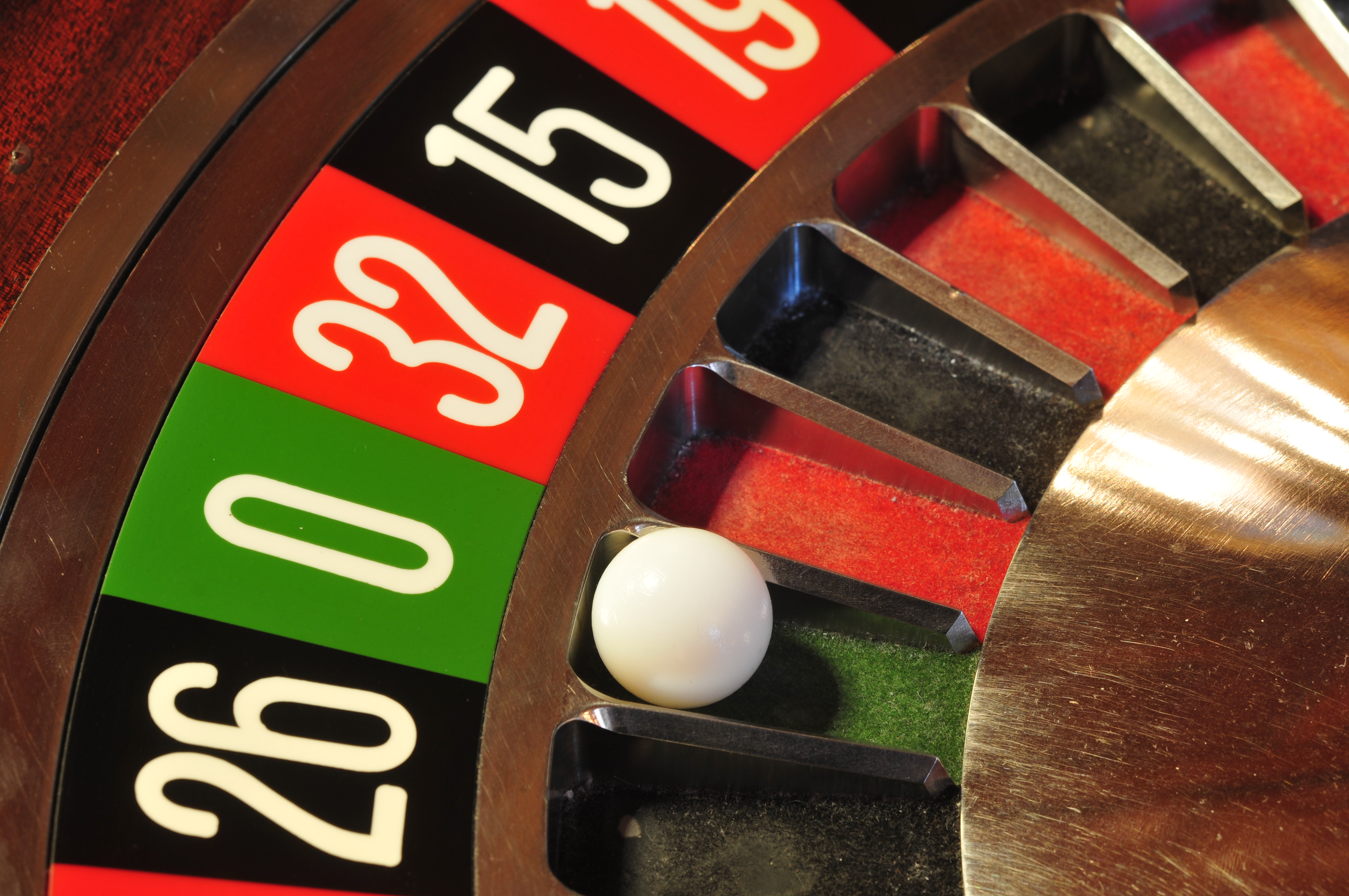
Roulette is a game of pure chance; no strategy can give players advantages, the outcome is determined purely by which numbered pocket a ball randomly falls into.

A game of chance is a game whose outcome is strongly influenced by some randomizing device. It is in contrast with a game of skill. Common devices used in games of chance include dice, spinning tops, playing cards, roulette wheels, numbered balls, or in the case of digital games random number generators. A game of chance may be played as gambling if players wager money or anything of monetary value.

Alternatively, a game of skill is one in which the outcome is determined mainly by mental or physical skill, rather than chance.

While a game of chance may have some skill element to it, chance generally plays a greater role in determining its outcome. A game of skill may also have elements of chance, but skill plays a greater role in determining its outcome.

Gambling is known in nearly all human societies, even though many have passed laws restricting it. Early people used the knucklebones of sheep as dice. Some people develop a psychological addiction to gambling and will risk food and shelter to continue.

== Skill ==
Some games that involve an element of luck may also require a certain level of skill. This is particularly evident when players need to make decisions based on prior knowledge or incomplete information, as seen in games like blackjack. In contrast, games such as roulette and punto banco (baccarat) rely more on chance, with players having the choice to determine their bet amount and selection, leaving the outcome largely to luck. Consequently, these games are categorized as games of chance, although a minimal skill component is still involved.

The distinction between 'chance' and 'skill' is relevant because in some countries, chance games are illegal or at least regulated, but skill games are not. Since there is no standardized definition, poker, for example, has been ruled a game of chance in Germany and, by at least one New York state Federal judge, a game of skill.

== Addiction ==
People who engage in games of chance and gambling can develop a strong dependence on them. In clinical settings, this addiction is formally termed as Gambling Disorder. The parameters that psychologists use to diagnose the disorder depend on which diagnostic manual they reference: the DSM-5-TR or the ICD-11. Additionally, gambling is only classified as a disorder if it dysfunctionally affects a person's life. Psychoanalyst Edmund Bergler identified six characteristics commonly expressed by these individuals.

1. Regularity of play: A central characteristic for determining the threshold at which gambling becomes excessive or pathological.
2. Precedence: The game takes precedence over all personal or professional interests.
3. Cognitive Distortion: There is optimism in the player that is undeterred by repeated experiences of failure.
4. Disinhibition: The gambler exhibits an inability to cease play.
5. Escalation of Risk: Despite the precautions that they originally promised, they end up taking too many risks.
6. Subjective Thrill: The gambler often experiences a subjective thrill during phases of play, characterized by physiological tensions. For example, some of these physiological manifestations include shivering, heightened arousal, and a mixture of both painful and pleasant sensations. Consistent with Opponent-Process Theory, these experiences correspond to significant dopamine spikes, particularly following periods of abstinence and "dopamine fasting."

== State revenues ==
Governments that authorize games of chance generate significant gambling revenues.

According to the UK Gambling Commission, the government received a total gross gambling revenue of £14.4 billion ($19 billion) in 2018. That was up 45% from a year earlier.

The Gambling Commission is an executive non-departmental body of the UK government. It is responsible for regulating gambling in the UK. It also oversees gambling legislation.

The state government of Nevada, USA, reported total gambling-related revenues totaling $26.2 billion in 2017. According to iGaming Business, casinos paid $852.2 million in direct gambling taxes during that year, which accounted for approximately 7.7% of the total gambling win.

== Types ==
There are dozens of different types of games of chance. The most popular online casino games are video poker, roulette, craps, blackjack and sports betting. Baccarat is also popular.

- Casinos - In person or online.
- Arcades - which may be intended exclusively for persons over the age of 18 or families.
- Bingo - which can be held in a bingo hall or online.
- Betting - which can be conducted online, in betting shops (sweepstakes) or at the event.
- Slot machines - such as fruit machines or fixed odds betting terminals.
- Video lottery terminals (VLTs) - machines that are connected to a central system that controls game outcomes.
- Pachinko - a Japanese game that mediates between a pinball machine and a slot machine.

== See also ==
- Gambler's ruin
- Game classification
- Game of dares
- Game of skill
- Lotería
- Monty Hall problem
- Move by nature
- Parlour game
- Russian roulette
- Stochastic process
