= Gambling parlour =

Gambling parlour may refer to:

- A betting parlour, where people gather to place bets, legally or illegally
- A pachinko parlour, where game pieces are rented, won or lost, and redeemed for money
- A sweepstakes parlor, an establishment that offers chances to win prizes upon purchase of token goods
