= Carnival game =

Game of chance or skill played at a variety of events

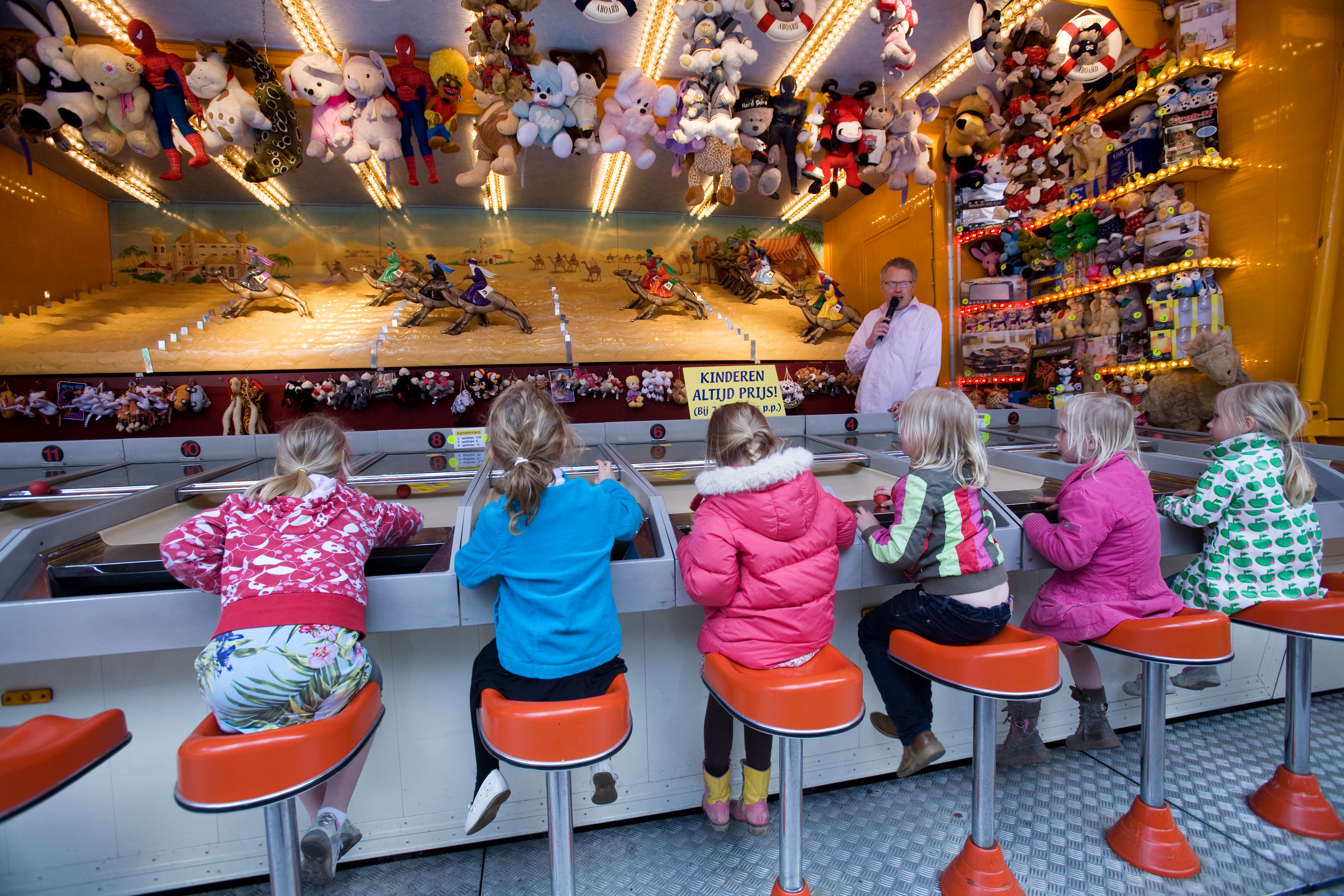
Children playing a competitive racing game in Amsterdam.

A carnival game is a game of chance or skill that can be seen at a traveling carnival, charity fund raiser, amusement arcade and amusement park, or on a state and county fair midway. They are also commonly played on holidays such as Mardi Gras, Saint Patrick's Day, and Oktoberfest.

Carnival games are usually operated on a "pay per play" basis. Prices may range from a small amount, for example 25 cents, to a few dollars per play. Most games offer a small prize to the winner. Prizes may include items like stuffed animals, toys, or posters. Continued play is encouraged as multiple small prizes may be traded in for a larger prize. Multiplayer games — the "Watergun" game is one example—may change the size of the prize with the number of players. In a more difficult game, including the "Baseball and Basket" or "Stand the Bottle", a large prize may be awarded to any winner.

Carnival games have a poor reputation in some areas. This may be that some carnival games utilize optical illusions or physical relationships that make it hard for a player to judge the game's difficulty. Also, some operators have run games that are rigged to take advantage of unsuspecting players. In many areas, these games are tested by local law enforcement to find unfairly run games.

== Carnival game operators ==
At amusement parks, the carnival games are usually owned and operated by the park owner. The games are usually installed in permanent buildings stationed around the park. A traveling carnival may, however, be made up of multiple independent game concession owners. These independents owners contract their games with the carnival operator. Carnival games of this type are mounted to towable trailers that enable the game to be moved from site to site. However, there are still some free-standing game booths that are assembled on site. These carnival games are usually set up in rows along the midway area along with the rides.

== Types of carnival games ==
=== Games of chance ===
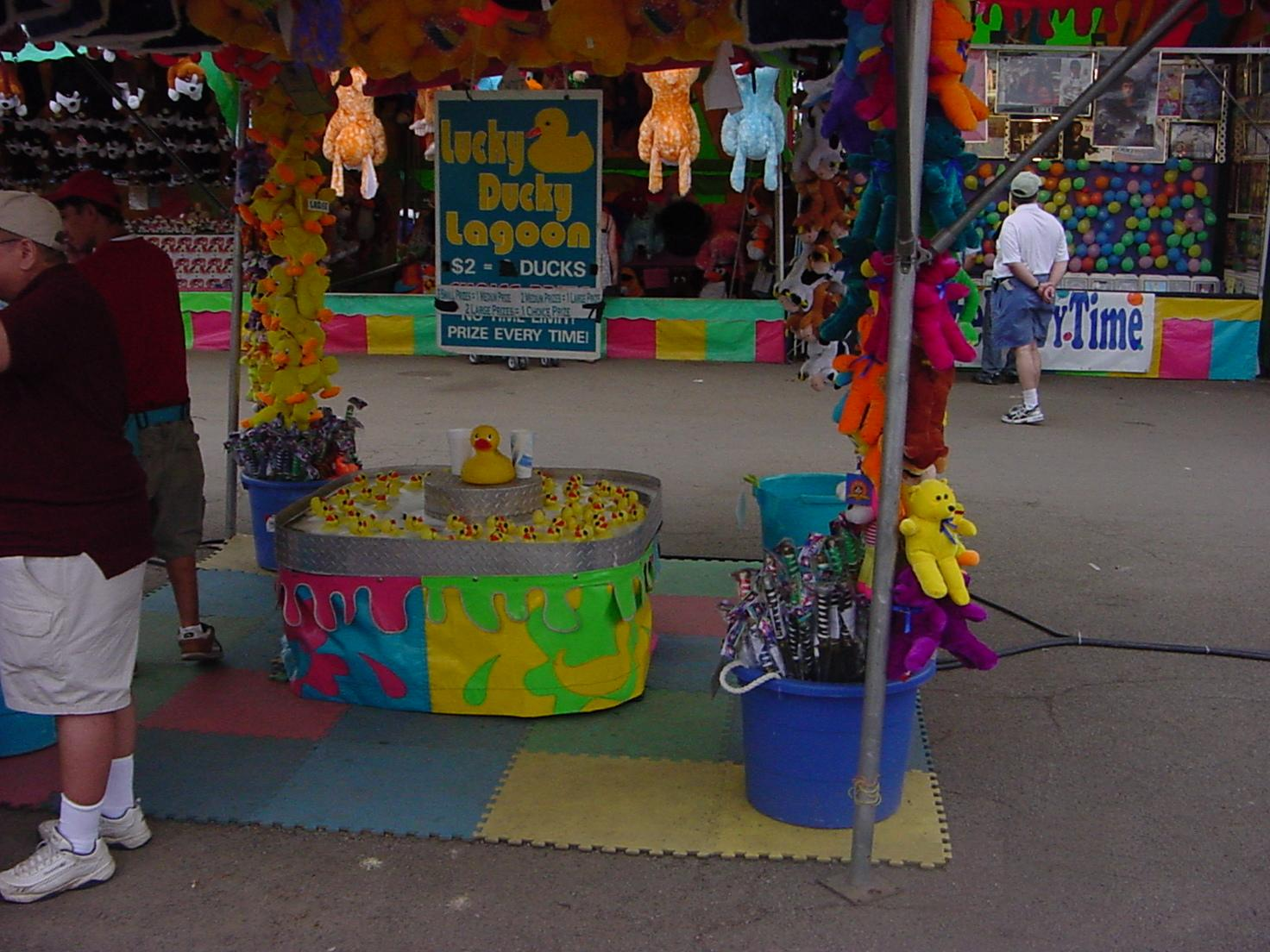
The Duck Pond Game

Games of chance are favorite carnival games. A random outcome gives all players the chance of winning a prize. An example of a carnival game of chance is the "Dime Pitch" game. The objective is to toss a coin (typically a dime or quarter) onto a horizontal board that has random marks on it. The marks on the board are the same diameter as the coin thrown. By completely covering the mark on the board with the coin, the player wins. Another example of a game of chance is the "Birthday" game. Players place their bets on a rail mounted strip that has months, colors and holidays written on it. Many players choose the month of their birth for their bet. A random player is then selected to throw a large multisided die into a designated center area (play area) of the booth. The die thrown has corresponding months, colors and holidays written on the different sides. The month, color or holiday that shows on the top of the thrown die, when it stops, will indicate the winner.

In "Pingpong Ball and Fish Bowl" players throw pingpong balls at a table filled with rows of empty small fish bowls. If the player gets a ball in the bowl, they usually win a goldfish. A game like "Duck Pond," which is geared for young children, may offer a winner every time. The player selects a rubber duck that is floating at random in water. Writing on the bottom of the duck reveals the prize won.

A shooting gallery in Japan, 2019

=== Games of skill ===
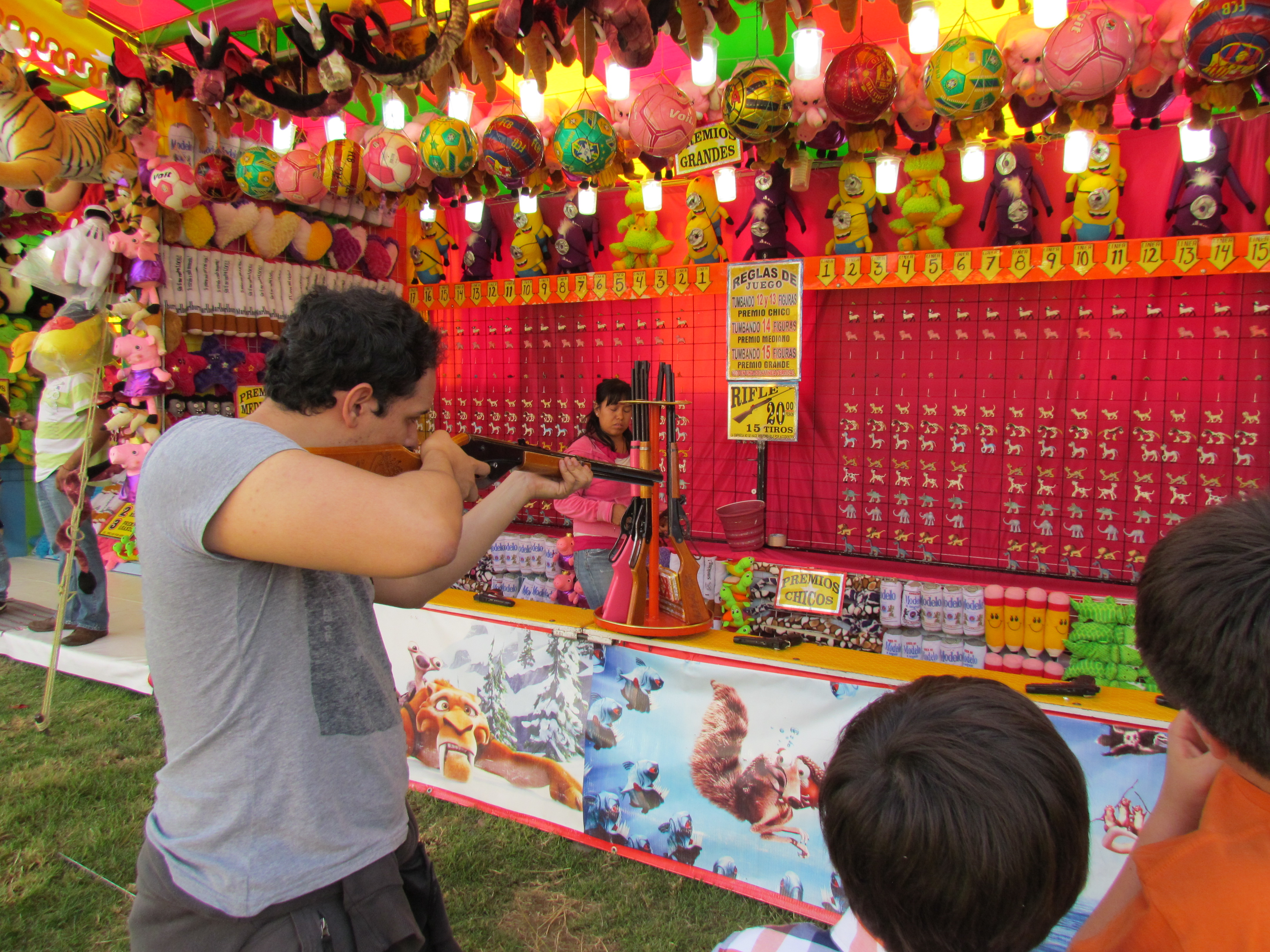
Shooting game at a mole festival in San Pedro Atocpan, Mexico City

Games of skill are another favorite carnival game. These games may test a players aim at hitting a target with either a ball or a weapon. Some games of this type are the "Cross Bow Shoot", the "Milk Bottle" game, or the "Balloon and Dart" game.

Other skill testing games challenge the physical abilities of the player. One example of this type of game is the "Rope Ladder Climb". In this game, the player must keep their balance while climbing an angled rope ladder that can pivot and invert the player. The object of the game is to climb the ladder, without falling off, and ring a bell at the end of the climb. Another game that tests the physical abilities of the player is "Ring the Bell". The player uses a large mallet to strike a pivot board on the game, this causes an indicator to be driven vertically up an indicator scale board. By hitting the pivot hard enough, the indicator will ring a bell mounted at the top of the indicator scale board indicating a win. Cover the spot is a game that involves covering a giant red spot with five smaller discs dropped by hand; all red (or color) must be covered to win.

== "Rigged" carnival games ==
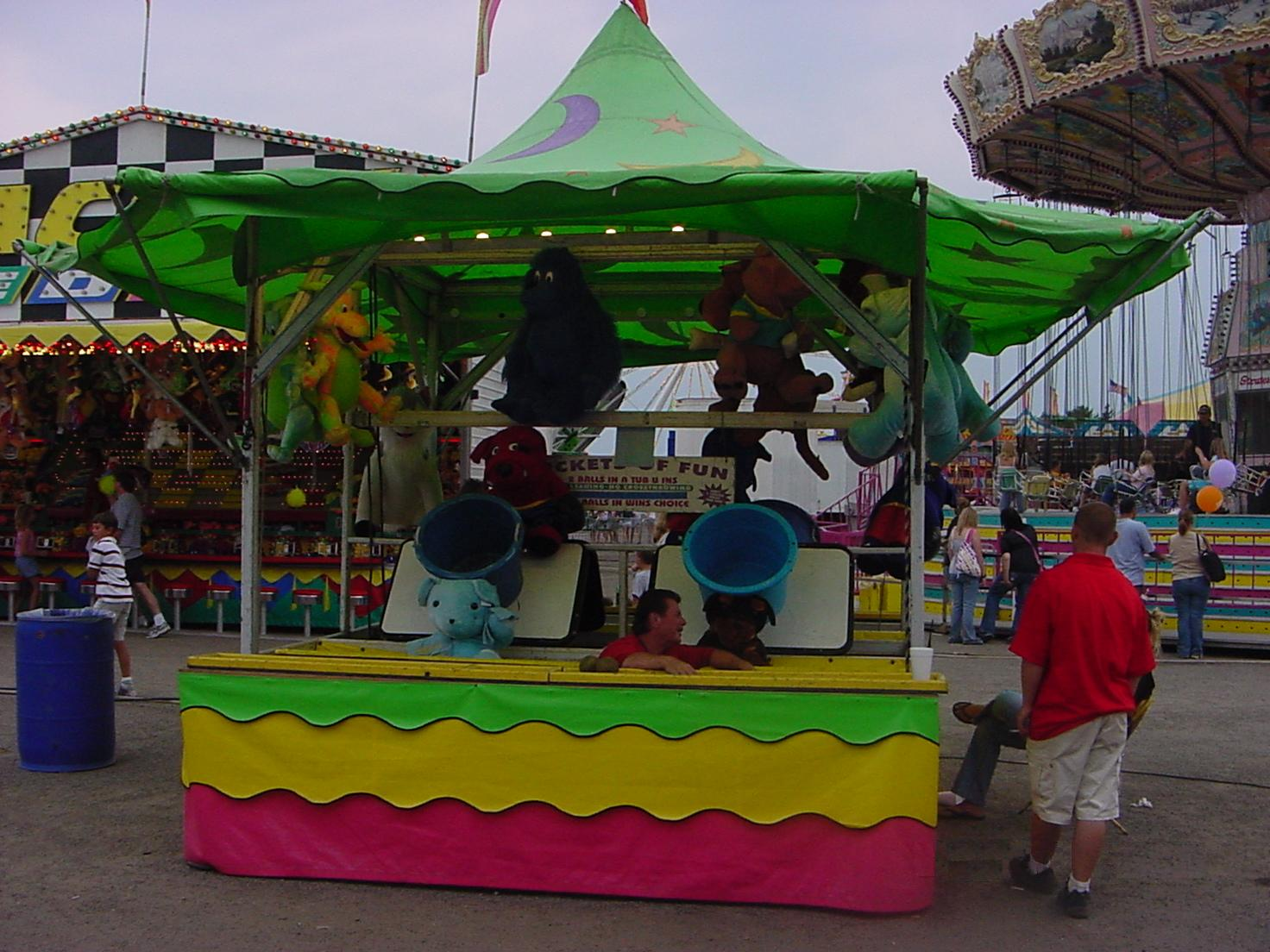
The ball and bucket game

Carnival games are often viewed or portrayed as dishonest, due to past history that may not necessarily apply to modern-day games and operators. The term "mark" (meaning sucker) originated with the carnival.

When dishonest carnival game operators found someone who they could entice to keep playing their rigged (slang term: "gaffed") game, they would then "mark" the individual by patting their back with a hand that had chalk on it. Other game operators would then look for these chalk marks and entice the individuals to also play their rigged game.

Rigging a carnival game may be done in many different manners depending on the game. For example, the "Ball and Basket" game may be rigged by moving the "A" frame onto which the basket is mounted. This would change the trajectory of the ball. Another method has the operator leaving a ball in the basket for the demonstration which absorbs the energy of the tossed ball, enabling the ball to stay in the basket, and then remove it when the mark plays, which makes the ball much more susceptible to bouncing out. In a game like "Ring Toss", the blocks that the prizes are attached to are cut in such a way as to ensure the ring will not fit. The "Balloon and Dart" game can be rigged by underinflating the balloons or by using dull point darts. Some games may be rigged to play honestly or dishonestly and can be switched by the game operator. The "Milk Bottle" game can be rigged this way. On a rigged game, one of the milk bottles is heavier than the others. Depending on how the bottles are stacked will determine if the player will win.

Some games are simply impossible to win. One such game is the "Push 'em Up" (or "Stand the Bottle") game, which requires the player to stand up a bottle with a 2-tine plastic fork, was featured in episode 5 of Penn & Teller Tell a Lie. The bottles used in the game are weighted on one side, which makes it impossible to stand the bottles upright without tipping them over when the heavier side is rotated to the top. The "Bottle Up," often confused with this game, is simply a skill game where the player uses a fishing pole with a ring attached to the end of the string to stand up the bottle.

By rigging the game, the game operators can vastly increase the money they take in.

In many areas, local law enforcement will test the carnival games prior to and during the carnival to help eliminate rigged games. However, there are still some dishonest game operators. One method they use to avoid law enforcement is to give legitimate instruments or make the carnival game "fair-and-square" during testing, but rig it for other people.

== Racist carnival games in the U.S. ==
In the United States, there was a longtime tradition of carnival games the point of which was to hurt, dehumanize or denigrate Black people. Such games included "African dodger" or "bean-em", where a Black person would stick their head through a curtain to be pelted with beanbags, eggs or baseballs, or "dunk tanks" that would drop a Black person into a tank of water if fairgoers hit a target with a ball. In her 2020 book Caste, Isabel Wilkerson describes these games as part of "a culture of cruelty [that] made violence and mockery seem mundane and amusing", teaching and reinforcing the U.S. racial caste system through entertainment.

== Gallery ==
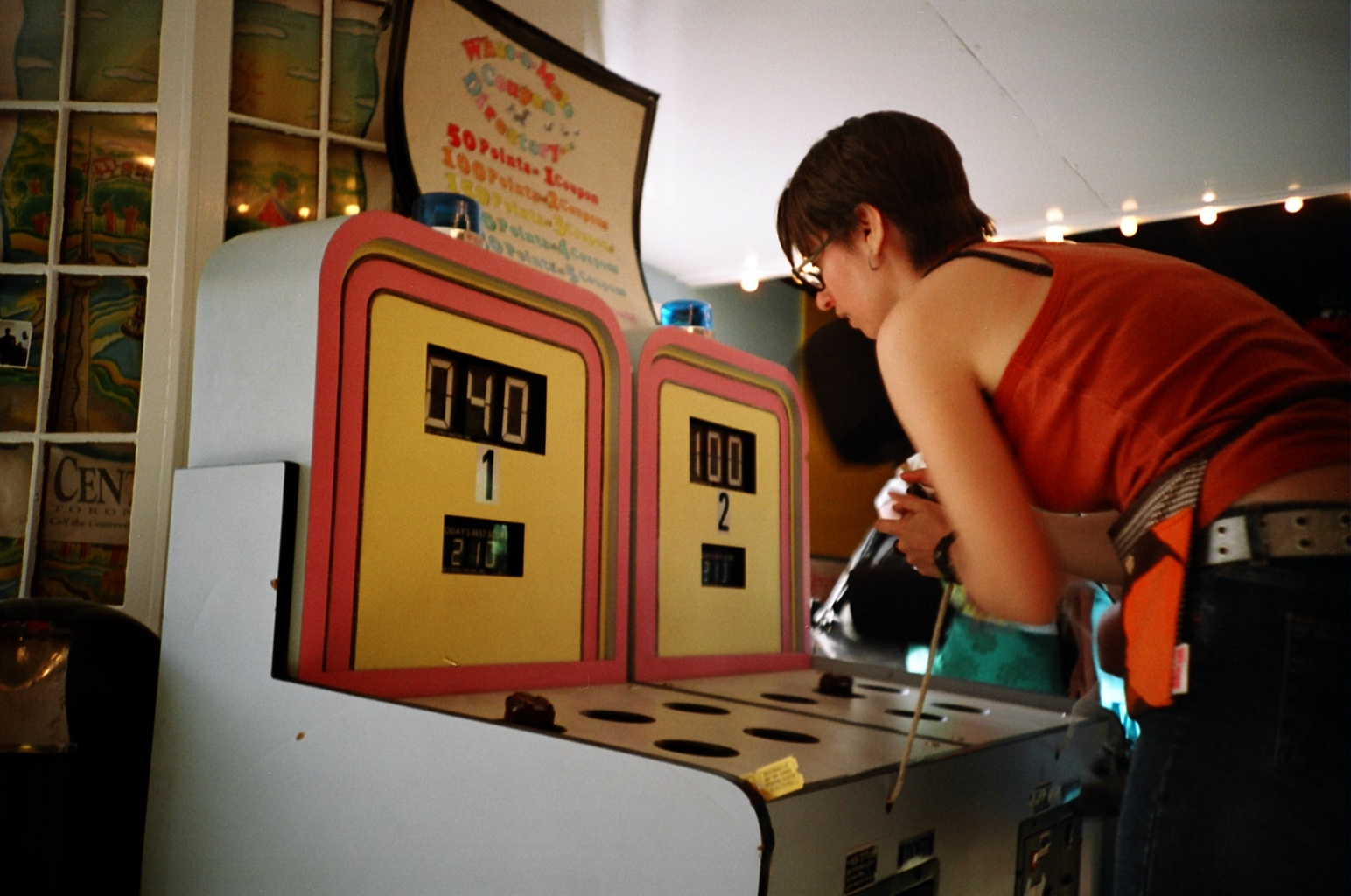
Whack-A-Mole game

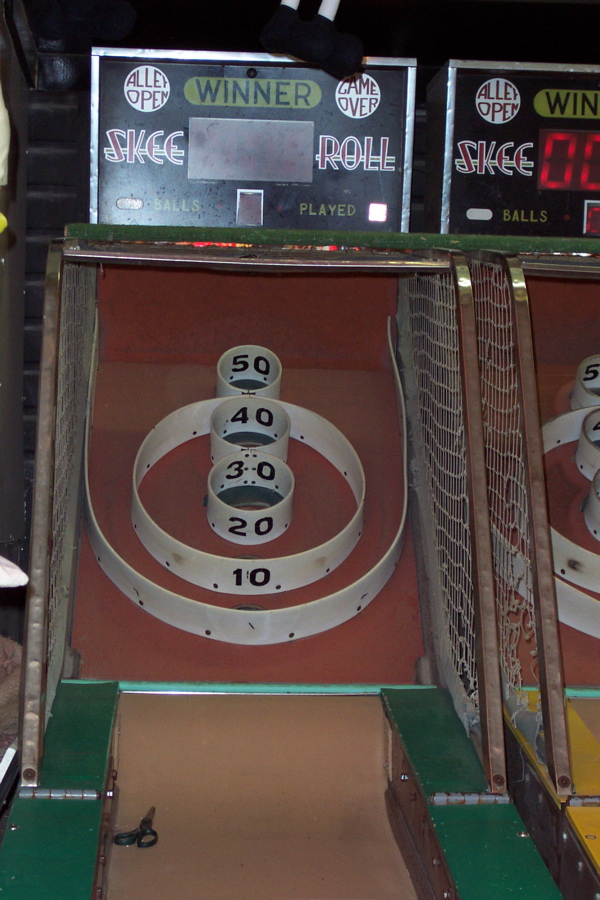
Skee Ball game

Weight Guessing Booth

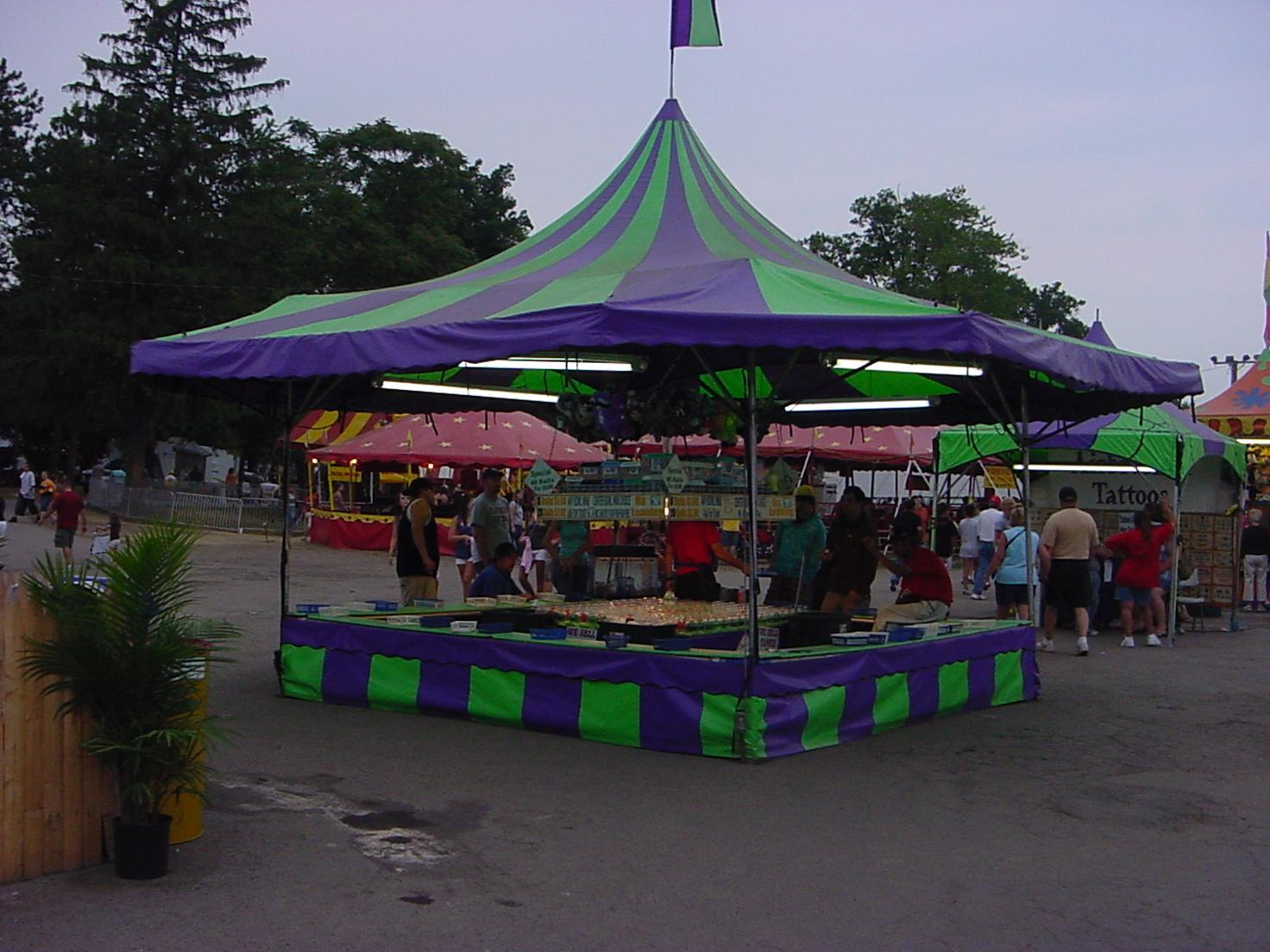
Pingpong Ball and Fishbowl game

I Got It game (variant of fascination)

Water Gun game

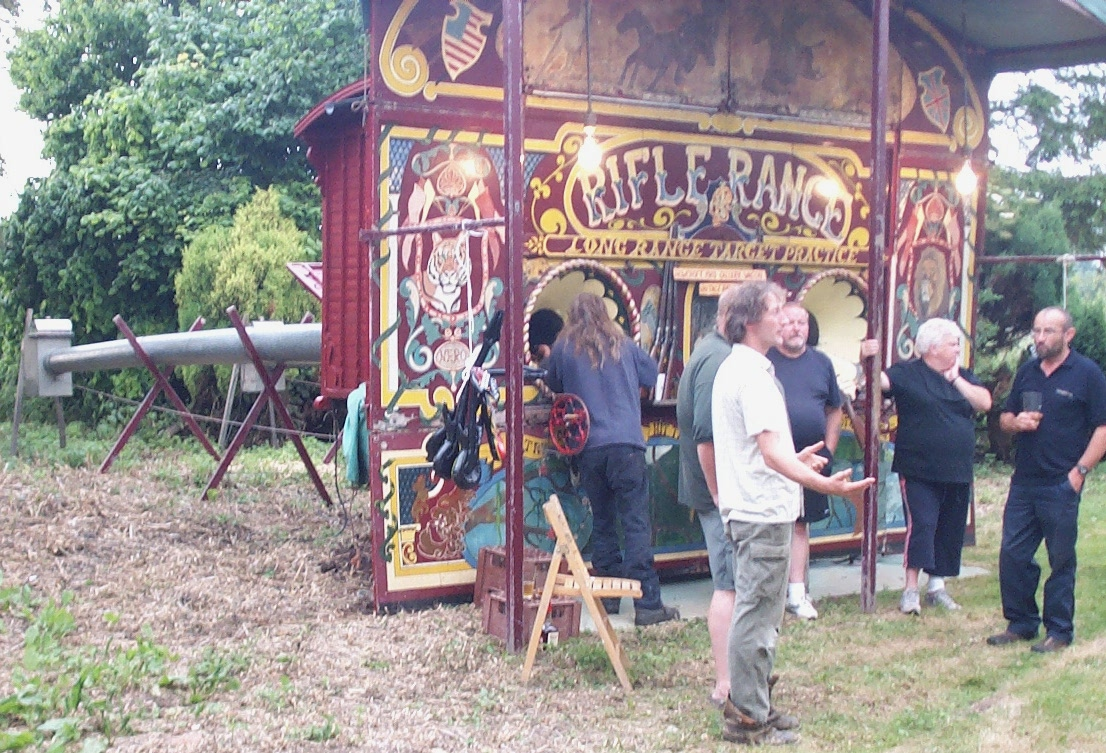
Miniature rifle range

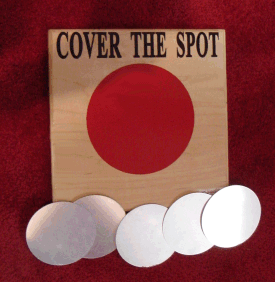
Cover the Spot

== List of carnival games ==
- African dodger
- Ball and Bucket Toss
- Balloon And Dart
- Basketball
- Big Six wheel
- Bingo
- Birthday
- Bottle Stand
- Bottle Roll
- Bulldozer
- Cat Rack
- Coconut shy
- Cover the spot
- Crazy Bike
- Cross Bow Target Shoot
- Darts
- Dime Pitch
- Duck Pond
- Dunk tank
- Fishing
- High striker or Ring the Bell
- Horse Race
- I Got It
- Kissing booth
- Ladder Climb
- Milk Bottle
- Pingpong Ball and Fishbowl
- Plate Break
- Ring toss
- Shoot the Freak
- Shooting Gallery
- Skee-Ball
- Tin can alley
- Water Gun
- Weight Guessing Booth
- Whac-A-Mole
- Wheel of Fortune
- Wire loop game

== See also ==
- Arcade game
- Traveling carnival
- Game classification
- Game of skill
- Redemption game
- Confidence Trick
- Confidence Man (disambiguation)
