= Gaming parlour =

Gaming parlour may refer to:

- A betting parlour, where people gather to place bets, legally or illegally
- A pachinko parlour, where game pieces are rented, won or lost, and redeemed for money
- A sweepstakes parlor, an establishment that offers chances to win prizes upon purchase of token goods

== See also ==
- Amusement arcade
- Parlour game
