= Sweet Licks =

1981 arcade game

- North American promotional sales flyer
- Developers: Namco; TOGO
- Publisher: Namco
- Designer: Yukio Ishikawa
- Release: JP: April 1981; NA: April 1982; EU: 1982
- Genres: Redemption; Mole-buster

Sweet Licks, known as Okashi Daisakusen (Note: Japanese: おかし大作戦, English: Funny Sweets Battle) in Japan and Choco-Kid in Europe, is a 1981 coin-operated redemption mole-buster arcade game developed and published by Namco. Players use a foam-covered mallet to whack the eight "Pyokotan" cake monsters that emerge from the colored holes placed on the machine. Points are awarded for hitting them, and the speed of the game increases until the time limit runs out. Hitting 40 Pyokotan will increase the timer by 15 seconds.

Designed by Namco mechanical designer Yukio Ishikawa, Sweet Licks was created in response to the growing number of "mole buster" arcade games in Japanese entertainment centers. The game was themed around cake and pastries to make it stand out from similar games and to attract women, since they often liked to eat desserts or sweets. It is the first arcade game to employ an LCD monitor, which kept track of the player's score and the countdown timer.

Sweet Licks was widely-successful, and is considered an influential and important game in the arcade industry for inspiring other manufacturers to create similar titles, becoming a large, growing market in later years. Critics praised the game for its light-hearted tone, simple gameplay and attractive cabinet design. The game made Namco more willing to create similar games later on, such as Gator Panic in 1989.

== Gameplay ==
Sweet Licks is a redemption arcade game with a cake motif. Players use a foam mallet to whack the eight "Pyokotan" that pop out of the various colored holes in the machine. The objective is to hit as many Pyokotan as possible before the countdown timer, displayed via an LCD screen on the cabinet, runs out. Hitting 40 Pyokotan will increase the timer by 15 seconds, allowing for additional points to be scored. The Pyokotan move faster as the game progresses. Once the timer runs out, the game will be over, and the player's performance will be determined by a flashing light on the machine.

== Development and release ==
The Pyokotan are powered by a solenoid connected to the hardware, and a metal shaft to make them move up and down.

The first "mole buster" game was Mogura Taiji, released by TOGO, a manufacturer and designer of arcade electro-mechanical games, in 1975. It became Japan's second highest-grossing electro-mechanical arcade game of 1976 and again in 1977, second only to Namco's popular arcade racing game F-1 in both years.

Sweet Licks was designed by Yukio Ishikawa, a mechanical designer for the Japanese game company Namco. Namco, who was beginning to shift towards arcade video game production after hits like Galaxian and Pac-Man, began to notice arcade centers in Japan be flooded with "mole buster" games, where players used a foam mallet to hit plastic moles that popped out of the machine. To capitalize on their popularity, Namco began work on a similar game with a unique motif to help it stand out from other similar games.

Sweet Licks was originally designed by TOGO, who had originally named it Mole Attack. Namco purchased the rights to the game and reskinned it. The game is themed around cake and pastries to help attract women, since women often liked to eat desserts or sweets. It used an LCD monitor to keep track of the player's score, being the very first arcade game to employ such a concept. The eight Pyokotan are powered by an electro-mechanical magnet, consisting of a solenoid powered by the arcade hardware and a metal shaft to make them move up and down; this concept was used to reduce the failure rate of the machine.

Sweet Licks was released in Japan in April 1981. The machine measured 61 inches tall, 45 inches wide, and 43 inches deep. Namco's North American division presented the game at the 1982 Amusement Operator's Expo tradeshow, held in the Hyatt Regency Hotel in Chicago, Illinois, where it was renamed to Sweet Licks. The game was released in North America in April 1982. It was re-released later that year in European countries as Choco-Kid, a title originally used on the artwork for the Japanese version.

== Reception ==
Sweet Licks performed well in arcades, being a surprise hit for Namco. It was mostly popular with families and women for its light-hearted tone, becoming a mainstay in Japanese amusement centers, and its success lead Namco to produce several similar redemption games in later years, such as Gator Panic (1989). It is considered an influential title in the arcade game industry for its unique concept inspiring other manufacturers to pursue a similar idea.

Sweet Licks was liked by critics. Joystik magazine, who reported on the game's presence at the 1982 Amusement Operator's Expo tradeshow, labeled it as one of the stranger titles presented for its odd concept and bizarre gameplay, which they felt was "just too weird for words". Cash Box praised the game for the colorful cabinet design, cheery nature and for attempting to appeal towards children and families, which they liked for standing out against other mechanical games at the time. Advanced Computer Entertainment commented on the game's legacy and importance for the redemption game market, saying that its simplistic yet frantic gameplay helped make other companies take notice and produce similar machines, to a point where arcades in Japan began to see less of a focus on video games and more on similar "novelty" machines. Julian Rignall of CU Amiga labeled it "the sicket machine" ever in his coverage on early 1980s electro-mechanical coin-op games, writing that its simply-yet-addictive nature, "brilliant" gameplay and overall cute design made it one of the definitive mechanical games of the era.

In a 2012 retrospective article, Japanese news publication Livedoor News commended the game for its attempt at appealing towards women and families with its light-hearted tone and simplistic gameplay, a drastic comparison to the large wave of Space Invaders games that had flooded game centers a few years prior. Livedoor also commented on the game's distinct arcade cabinet and its overall build quality, saying that it was well-designed and wasn't faulty like other mechanical games from the era were. They also commented that the game would likely still be successful if it was released in the present time, due to redemption games finding more success in arcades in later years.

== See also ==
- Gator Panic
- Pac & Pal
- Whac-A-Mole
