= STQ (disambiguation) =

STQ is the call sign of a regional television station in Queensland, Australia.

It may also refer to:

- STQ, the IATA airport code for St. Marys Municipal Airport in Pennsylvania
- STQ, the ISO language code for the Saterland Frisian language
- Skill testing question
- Société des traversiers du Québec, ferry operator in Quebec, Canada
- stq: ISO 639-3 code for Saterland Frisian language
