= Vector TD =

Vector TD (including Vector TD 2, Vector TDx) was a popular flash game from 2007, ported to PSP in 2010 (the price was $3.99), PlayStation 3, iPhone that was developed by David Scott and published by PCH Games. Visual creates a Tron atmosphere. Splits levels across three difficulty levels.

Its IGN rating is 8/10.

== Gameplay ==
Each tower can be upgraded to level 10. Certain enemy waves will drop a bonus point that can be used to boost attack power, range, money earned or boost a player's available stockpile of lives.
