= Sweepstake =

Type of lottery where products are awarded as prizes

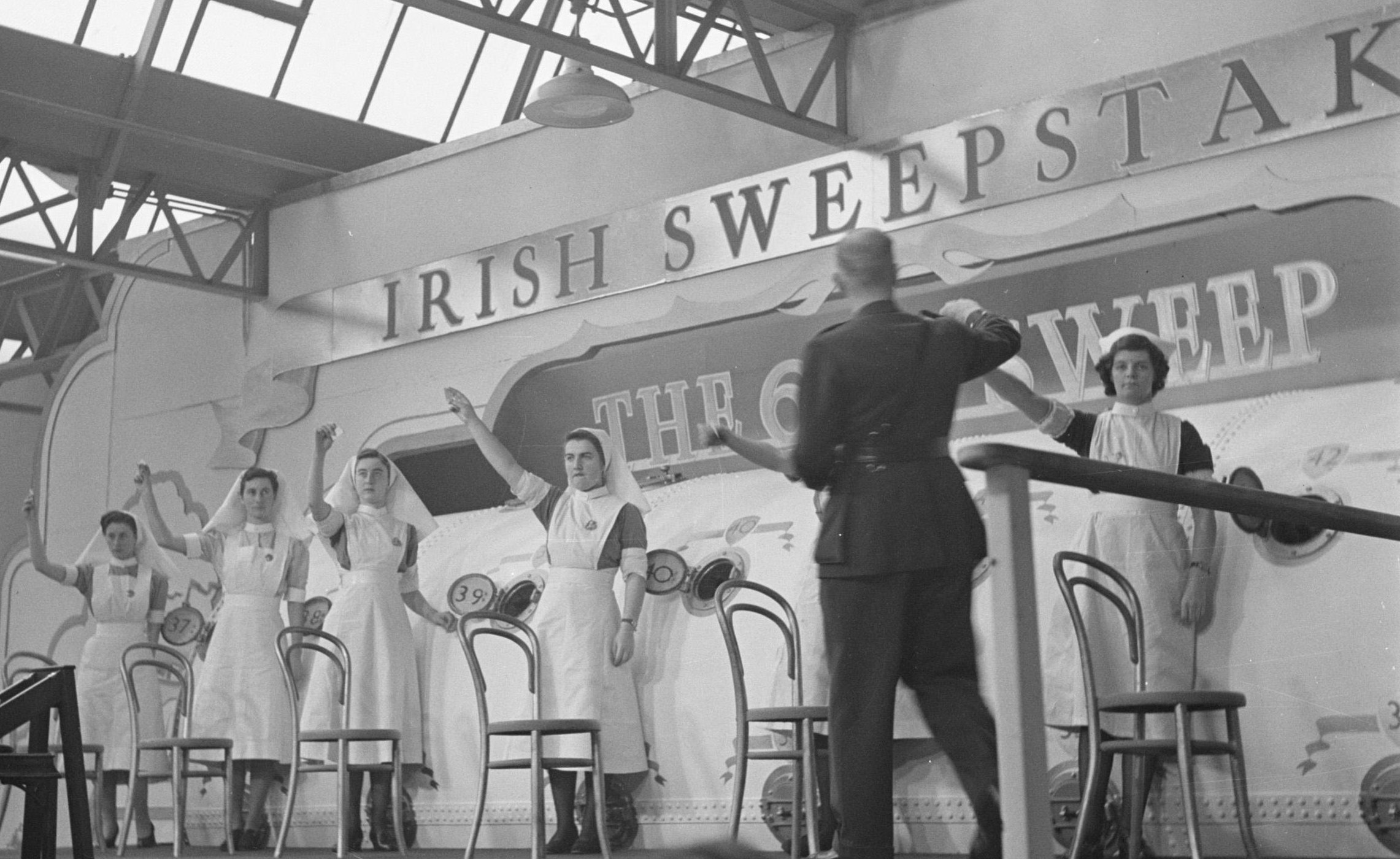
Tickets being chosen in the Irish Hospitals Sweepstake, 1946

A sweepstake (also sweepstakes) is a type of contest in which a prize or prizes are awarded to winners selected by chance rather than skill. Sweepstakes have a long history in many countries, though they are regulated differently depending on jurisdiction. In some countries, such as the United States, sweepstakes must by law be free to enter, while in others, such as Australia, a purchase may be required. In Canada, Australia, and several European countries, entrants may be required to answer a skill testing question to avoid the contest being classified as gambling. Sweepstakes are widely used as marketing promotions to reward existing consumers and draw attention to a product.

== Etymology ==
The word sweepstake dates to at least the 15th century. It originally referred to the person who "swept" (collected) all the stakes in a wager or contest; that is, the winner who took the entire pot. Over time, the meaning shifted from the winner to the contest itself, particularly horse races in which the entry fees of all participants were pooled and awarded to the owner of the winning horse. The form sweepstakes, with a terminal -s, emerged as the more common spelling by the 19th century, though both forms remain in use. The modern sense, a promotional prize draw, often with no entry fee, developed in the 20th century, particularly in the United States.

== Marketing ==
Sweepstakes with large grand prizes tend to attract more entries regardless of the odds of winning. Therefore, the value of smaller prizes usually totals much less than that of the top prize. Firms that rely on sweepstakes for attracting customers, such as Publishers Clearing House and Reader's Digest, have also found that the more involved the entry process, the more entrants. Businesses often obtain marketing information about their customers from sweepstakes entries.

== Regulation ==
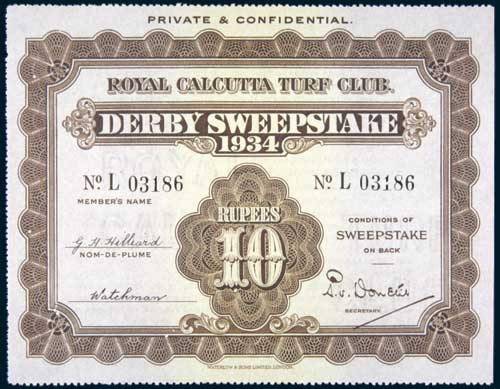
A Calcutta Derby sweepstake ticket

Because of their potential for abuse, sweepstakes are heavily regulated in many countries. The US, Canada, and individual US states all have laws covering sweepstakes, so there are special rules depending on where the entrant lives. The U.S. Federal Trade Commission exercises some authority over sweepstakes promotion and sweepstakes scams in the United States. Notably, sweepstakes in Canada, Australia, and several European countries require entrants to answer a skill testing question such as solving an elementary-school-level mathematical puzzle, or answering a simple general knowledge question, making it (in theory, at least) a contest of skill in order to overcome requirements that would classify sweepstakes as a form of gambling under their country's legal definition. There are similar laws in Brazil.

== Australia ==
In Australia, a sweepstake is known as a competition, however the technical name for a consumer competition is a trade promotion lottery.

A trade promotion lottery is a free entry lottery conducted to promote goods or services supplied by a business. Unlike in the U.S., entrants may be required to purchase a product in order to enter a trade promotion in Australia.

Companies or promoters may require a trade promotion lottery permit if the winner(s) are to be chosen via an element of chance, i.e. a competition draw.

No permits are required for competitions that do not involve an element of chance in determining the winner or winners. Common examples include competitions where entrants are required to submit a photo or an answer to a question in 25 words or less.

Many compers (those who enjoy entering competitions) attend annual national conventions. In 2012 over 100 people from the online competitions website lottos.com.au met on the Gold Coast, Queensland to discuss competitions.

== United Kingdom ==
Sweepstakes with an entry fee are considered in the UK to be lotteries under the Gambling Act 2005.

Most sweepstakes in the UK are small-scale. They are classed as work lotteries, residents' lotteries, or private society lotteries, and do not require a licence, provided that all the money staked is paid out as prize money.

The popularity of the term "sweepstakes" may derive from the Irish Sweepstakes, which were very popular from the 1930s to the 1980s.

There is a tradition of office sweepstakes (known as office pools in the U.S.), which are usually based on major sporting events such as the Grand National and the World Cup. Entrants pay an equal stake for each horse/team they draw out of the hat before the event. The winner then takes the pot. For horse racing events, the pot may be split between the horses that win, place, and show.

What an American would call a "sweepstakes" — a random prize draw promoting a commercial product — is likely to be labelled as a "prize draw" or "competition" in the UK.

In the UK, prize competitions and prize draws are free of statutory control under the Gambling Act 2005, but should follow the CAP Code.

== United States ==
U.S. Federal Trade Commission seal

In the United States, sweepstakes originated as a form of lottery tied to products sold. In response, the FCC and FTC refined U.S. broadcasting laws (creating the anti-lottery laws). Under these laws sweepstakes became strictly "No purchase necessary to enter or win" and "A purchase will not increase your chances of winning", especially since many sweepstakes companies skirted the law by stating only "no purchase necessary to enter", removing the consideration (one of the three legally required elements of gambling) to stop abuse of sweepstakes.

Sweepstake sponsors are very careful to disassociate themselves from any suggestion that players must pay to enter, or pay to win, since this would constitute gambling. Sweepstakes typically involve enticements to enter a consumer promotion with prizes that range from substantial wins such as cars or large sums of money to smaller prizes that are currently popular with consumers. There should be no monetary cost to the entrant (although some sweepstakes require entrants to subscribe to a promotional mailing list, potentially exposing the entrant to an increase in junk mail, spam email, or telemarketing calls) and sweepstakes winners should also not be required to pay any kind of fee to receive their prizes.

As an example of a state policy on sweepstakes promotions, Tennessee residents are prohibited by a policy of the Tennessee Alcoholic Beverage Commission (and not a state law) from entering sweepstakes online sponsored by manufacturers of wines and liquors; however, Tennessee residents may enter many of these same sweepstakes promotions by entries delivered by the US Postal Service. Another example is that Tennessee state law prohibits sweepstakes agencies and sponsors from requiring sweepstakes prize winners to submit to "in perpetuity" publicity releases.

Most corporate-sponsored sweepstakes promoted in the United States limit entry to US citizens, although some allow entry by legal residents of both the United States and Canada.

Among the most popularly known sweepstakes in the United States were the American Family Publishers Sweepstakes (now defunct), Publishers Clearing House sweepstakes, and Reader's Digest Sweepstakes, each of which strongly persuaded entrants to purchase magazine subscriptions by placing stickers on contest entry cardstock while promising multimillion-dollar (annuity) winners who will be "announced on TV". The American Family Publishers sweepstakes used paid advertisements during NBC's The Tonight Show to announce its grand prize winners (for many years, its celebrity spokesman was Ed McMahon). All three companies eventually paid fines and penalties to a variety of states who initiated legal actions against them. Of those three companies, only Publishers Clearing House continues to use sweepstakes as a promotional device and as recently as 2010 paid $3.5 million to settle charges that it had violated the terms of a 2001 multi-state agreement for which it was fined $34 million.

Sweepstakes are frequently used by fast-food restaurants to boost business. One of the most popular has been the McDonald's Monopoly "instant-win" game-piece promotion (To satisfy the "no purchase necessary" requirement, free game pieces are made available on request through the US mail). Soft drink companies also sponsor many sweepstakes, such as the Pepsi Billion Dollar Sweepstakes game and the Pepsi Stuff loyalty rewards program that allowed Pepsi drinkers to accumulate points from packages and cups and redeem them for merchandise. Pepsi Stuff was Pepsi's largest and most successful long-term promotion ever and it ran for many years in the US and in many countries around the world. Other sponsors may require the submission of a UPC of a company product (with provision for receiving a "free" UPC) for entry into the sweepstakes drawing. Sweepstakes parlors, which began to appear in the US around 2005, are establishments that offer chances to win cash prizes as a promotion for a product, usually either a telephone card or Internet access. Sweepstakes casinos use a similar model, offering promotional real money winning opportunities by playing casino-style games online. Sweepstakes casinos apply a similar promotional model to online casino-style games. They commonly use separate virtual currencies for entertainment play and sweepstakes participation, while providing a free method of entry.

Sweepstakes must be carefully planned to comply with local laws and curtail forms of entrant fraud and abuse. Before home computers were popular, a common method of entry was a mailed, plain 3" × 5" index card with the entrant's name and address. Massive computer-printed entries resulted in a new requirement that entries must be "hand-printed". Laser printers that can mimic ink pen writing are also a problem for sponsors. In most sweepstakes, entrants and their relatives must not be related to the sponsor or promoter.

Many state lotteries also run second-chance sweepstakes in conjunction with the retail sale of state lottery scratch cards in an effort to increase consumer demand for scratch cards and help control the litter caused by the improper disposal of non-winning lottery tickets. Since lottery tickets are considered to be bearer instruments under the Uniform Commercial Code, these lottery scratch card promotions can be entered with non-winning tickets that are picked up as litter.
