= African dodger =

American carnival game

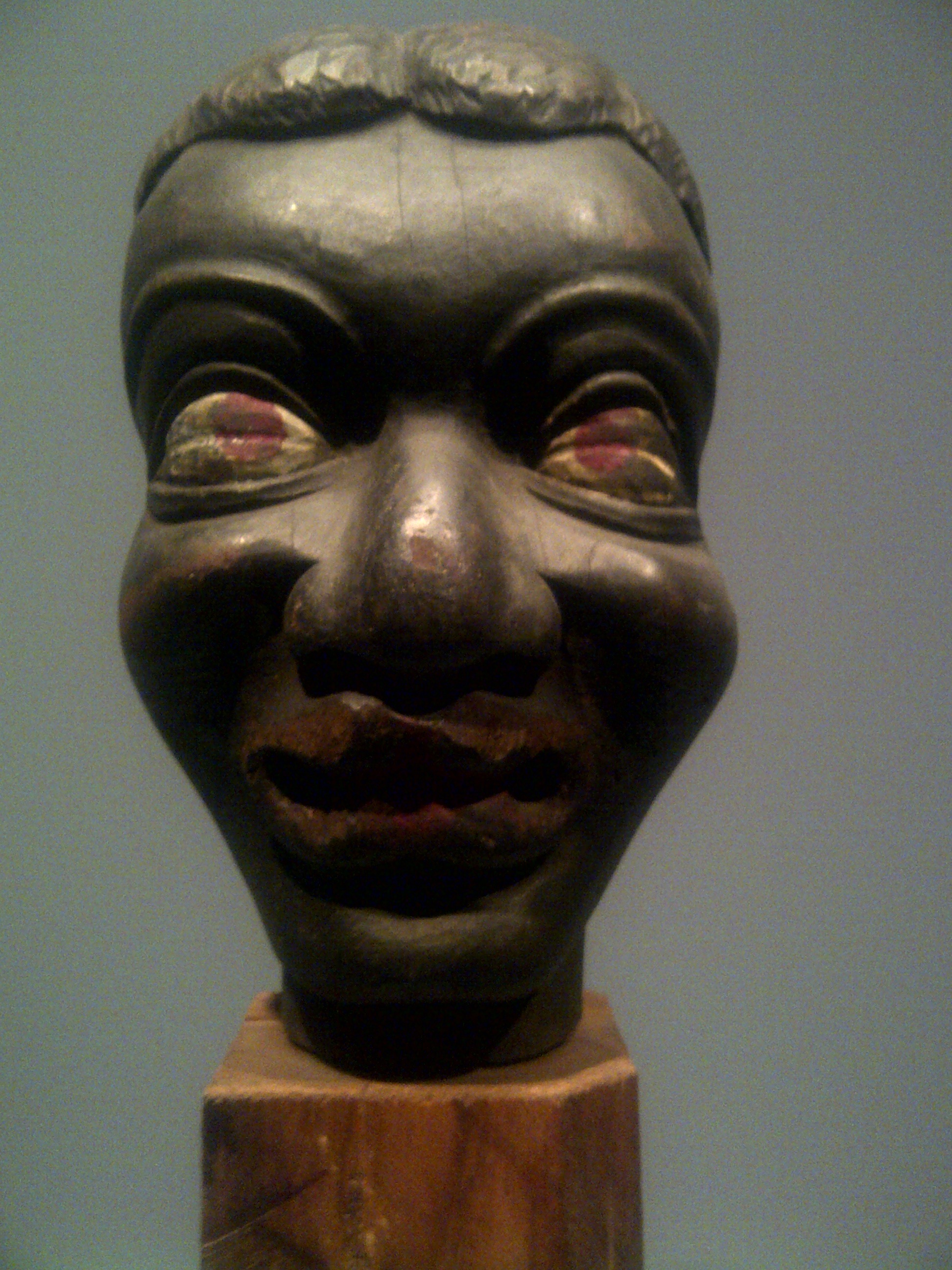
A wooden African dodger head used in some versions of the game

African dodger, also known as Hit the Coon or Hit the Nigger Baby, was a carnival game played in the United States. In the game, an African American would stick his head through a curtain, and attempt to dodge objects, such as eggs or baseballs, thrown at him by players. It was a popular carnival game from the 1880s up to the 1960s. The victims often suffered serious injuries. Smaller kit-based versions of the game were also sold to be played at home.

A Popular Mechanics article from 1910 noted that African dodger had become "too old and commonplace" and was being replaced with dunk tanks in which African Americans would fall into a tank of water when a target was hit with a ball. The illustration accompanying the article shows a game labeled "Drop the Chocolate Drop" and is captioned "Amusing to All but the Victim".

== See also ==
- Aunt Sally
- Shoot the Freak
