= Redemption game =

Arcade game of skill that awards prizes

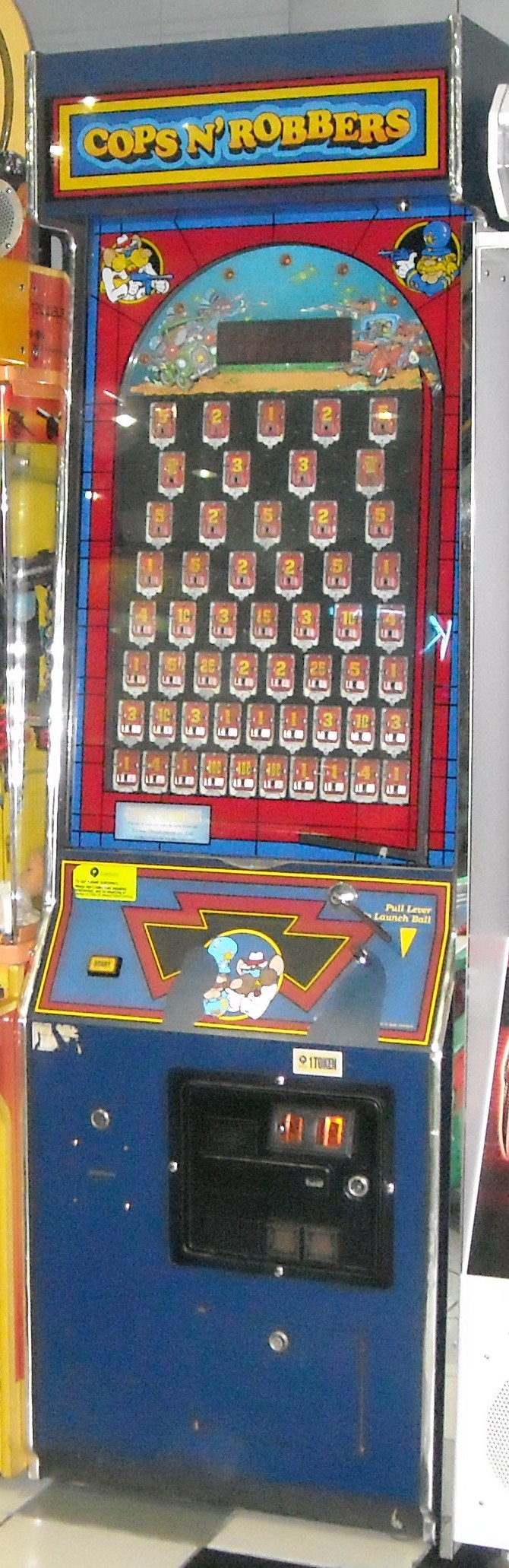
Cops N' Robbers. The player launches a metal ball causing it to land on a certain pocket in the field where they can earn a number of tickets ranging from 2 to 100.

Redemption games are typically arcade games of skill that reward the player proportionally to their score in the game. The reward most often comes in the form of tickets, with more tickets being awarded for higher scores. These tickets can then be redeemed (hence the name) at a central location for prizes. The most inexpensive prizes (candy, small plastic or rubber toys) may require only a small number of tickets to acquire, while the most expensive ones (skateboards, low-end electronics) may require several thousand. In general, the amount of money spent to win enough tickets for a given prize will exceed the value of the prize itself. Some redemption games, such as Flamin' Finger, involve elements of chance, which can be set by the operator.

A variation on the ticket-based redemption game is the merchandiser, which directly displays and dispenses merchandise, rather than dispensing tickets which are then redeemed for prizes. Arcade games that offer no prizes are known as non-redemption games.

Redemption games can be seen as the modern successor to carnival games, as the same general principles apply.

== Regulation ==
=== North America ===
==== New Jersey ====
The state of New Jersey in the United States is the first to prohibit redemption games that distribute tickets based on a player's skill without a valid Amusements License Issued by the State. Games must either dispense no tickets or a fixed number of tickets per play. For example, Chuck E. Cheese establishments located in these regions have their redemption games configured to always dispense four tickets per play, regardless of a player's skill level.

==== Florida ====
In April 2013, the state of Florida passed legislation designed to target sweepstakes parlors—among other changes, it prevents gambling machines from awarding prizes more than $0.75 in value, and prohibits them from accepting cards or bills as payment. Although the law does contain specific distinctions meant to exclude arcade redemption games from its scope, the law attracted concern from the arcade industry, who felt that it could be interpreted to ban their operation—especially at facilities that use card-based systems for credits rather than tokens. In January 2015, as a cautionary measure, Disney Parks removed redemption and claw machines from the arcades of its Florida resorts: representatives of the company have supported attempts to clarify the wording of the sweepstakes parlor ban to reduce its potential effects on arcades.

==== North Carolina ====
In North Carolina, table-mounted video games known as "fish games" are illegal in Greensboro, North Carolina because they are machines which result in a cash payout, not allowed "irrespective of whether the game requires skill or dexterity." After a 2017 court ruling, "fish arcades" were later determined to be gambling establishments and therefore illegal elsewhere. Two software companies filed an injunction against the sheriff's office in Rowan County on January 21, 2020 claiming gaming experts consider the businesses cited to be offering "games of skill".

==== Quebec ====
In the Canadian province of Quebec, arcades must pay operator fees and an additional fee per machine. If a game meets certain criteria, it may offer "free games or additional game time" as a prize. Examples include the Extra Stage mechanism in Dance Dance Revolution, or a racing game that awards a free race to those in first place. Only a game of skill, such as a claw crane, may distribute another type of prize. Arcade games cannot distribute prizes based on luck, as most redemption games do. This led to arcade chains such as Xscape and Cinémas Guzzo offering only traditional arcade games and games of skill.

In 2019, the Quebec government agreed to update the legislation regarding arcade games in the province, with the new laws taking effect in October 2019. Following this announcement, Canadian movie theater chain Cineplex Entertainment announced that it would be opening up a new location in Montreal's soon-to-be-constructed Royalmount mega mall complete with a restaurant, a VIP theater for adults aged 18 and over, and an arcade area called "The Rec Room", with the latter being the first of its kind in Quebec. The Rec Room will feature both skill- and luck-based arcade games in which visitors can earn credits and exchange them for prizes. The new theater is expected to open in 2022.

== Legacy ==
As revenue from traditional arcade games started to decline in the latter half of the 1990s due to competition from home game consoles and the Internet, arcade operators began to rely on the income from redemption and merchandiser games to remain profitable. These games were often much less expensive to purchase, and had a better return on investment than video games. The revenue from video games would diminish as game titles would get released to the home market— redemption games did not have that problem. Redemption and merchandiser games could generate good revenue for many years, compared to months for most video games. Redemption games have allowed many arcades to remain profitable in an ever-changing entertainment market.

== Examples ==
Many redemption games are based on popular media such as board games and mobile games.

=== Board games ===
- Connect 4
- Hungry Hungry Hippos
- Monopoly

=== Game shows ===
- Deal or No Deal (with versions based on the American and British game shows for America and the UK respectively)
- The Price Is Right
- Wheel of Fortune

=== Mobile games ===
- Angry Birds
- Candy Crush Saga
- Crossy Road
- Cut the Rope
- Doodle Jump
- Flappy Bird
- Fruit Ninja
- Pop the Lock
- Temple Run

=== Other games ===
- Alien Command
- Colorama
- Cyclone
- Hoop it Up
- Jumpin' Jackpot
- Magic Mr. X
- Pirate's Gold
- Slam-A-Winner
- Wheel 'M In

== Pachinko ==
A Japanese form of redemption game is pachinko, which features small metal balls which are both used in play and used for redemption, instead of tickets. Pachinko is primarily or entirely a game of chance.

== See also ==
- Medal game
- Skee ball
- Sweet Licks
- Whac-A-Mole
