= Dunk tank =

Attraction with the goal of dropping a target into a tank of water

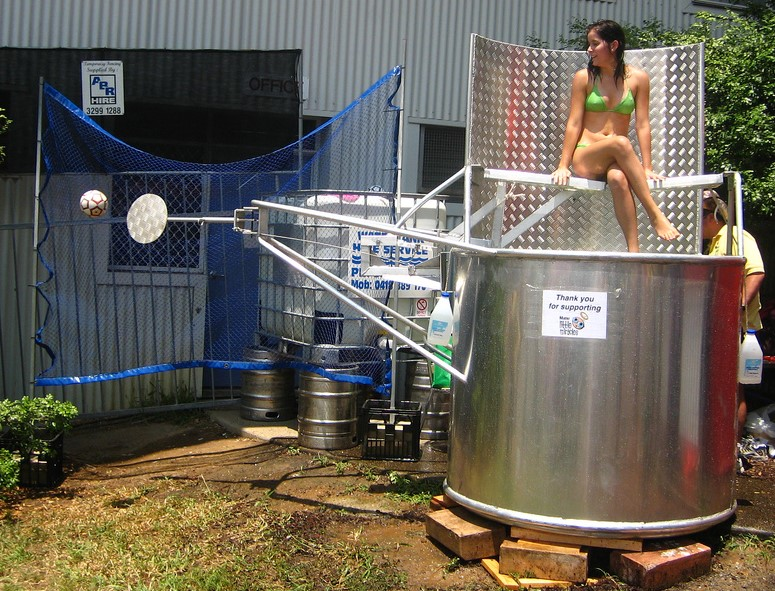
The dunking mechanism on the typical dunk tank is triggered by a ball hitting a small target.

A dunk tank, also known as a dunking booth or dunking machine, is an attraction mainly used in funfairs, fundraisers, and personal parties. A dunk tank consists of a large tank of water, over which a volunteer is suspended while sitting on a collapsing seat. The game is played by a ball being thrown at a target attached to the tank which, if hit, causes the seat to collapse, "dunking" the person into the tank.

== Experience ==
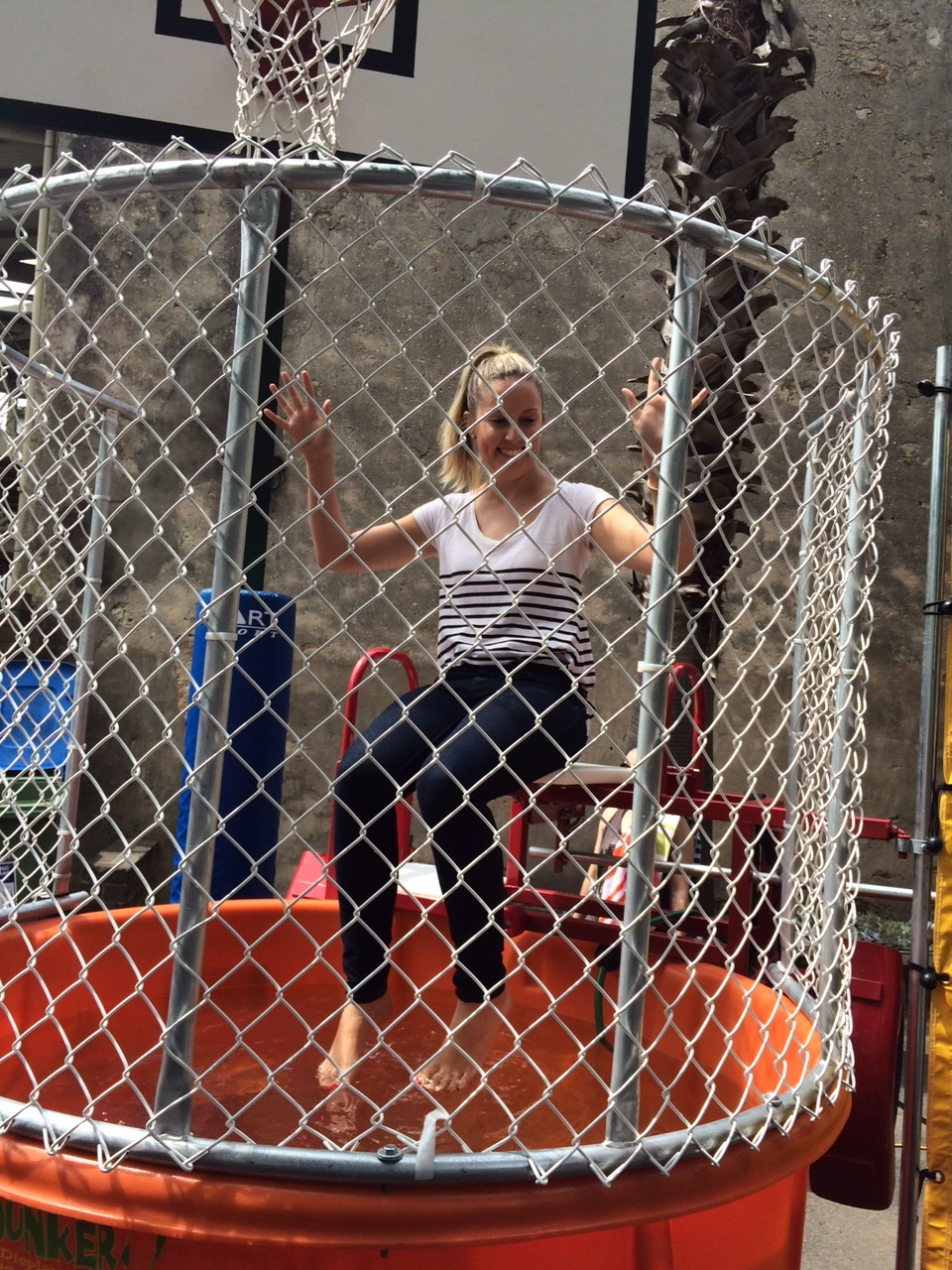
"Victim" Seated in a Dunk Tank

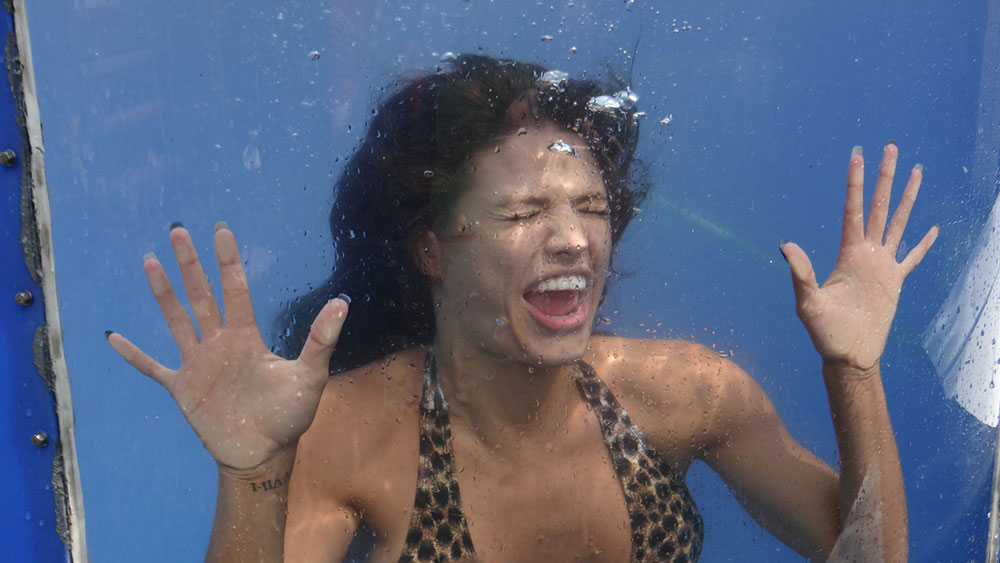
Just Dunked

Most dunk tanks consist of a plastic tank and seat, with a metal support frame and a target to the side of the tank. Other dunk tanks are made entirely of metal, and some are made of wood. The person to be dunked, called the "victim", climbs onto the seat via a ladder on the side of the dunk tank. Usually, there is fence-like protector around the seat, which is used to protect the person sitting on the seat from being injured by stray balls missing the target. The seat is latched in an upright position. By striking the target, the seat will suddenly collapse, thus "dunking" the victim into the tank of water. Being a dunk tank victim is generally regarded as embarrassing, humiliating, uncomfortable, and even miserable for the participant as the water is usually very cold and the weather may or may not be accommodating for the victim's comfort. Some participants thoroughly enjoy the experience of feeling uncertainty while sitting on a collapsible seat suspended over a freezing tank of water as well as the sudden shock or excitement of inevitably getting dunked into the tank. Regardless of enjoyment, people will volunteer to sit in a dunk tank for work, to entertain, as a form of humiliating punishment to pay off a losing bet, or for charity.

== Origin ==
The African dodger, also known as Hit the Coon, was a popular American carnival game from the late 19th century up to the mid-1940s. It involved an African-American man sticking his head out through a hole in a curtain and trying to dodge balls thrown at him. Hits were rewarded with prizes. People were seriously injured or reportedly even killed after being struck. In response to attempts to ban it, a less dangerous game was invented called the African dip, in which a person was dropped into a tank of water if a target was hit by a ball. Popular Mechanics noted in 1910 that African dodger had become "too old and commonplace" and was being replaced with dunk tanks. The illustration accompanying the article shows a game labelled "Drop the Chocolate Drop" and is captioned "Amusing to All but the Victim".

Generally, the African dodger is recognized as overtly racist. One variant, at Chicago's Riverview amusement park, was named "Dunk the Nigger" until the early 1950s when it was renamed "African Dip". The NAACP protested the attraction in the 1940s, and it was eventually shut down in the mid-1950s.

== Types of Dunk Tanks ==
=== The Easy Dunker ===
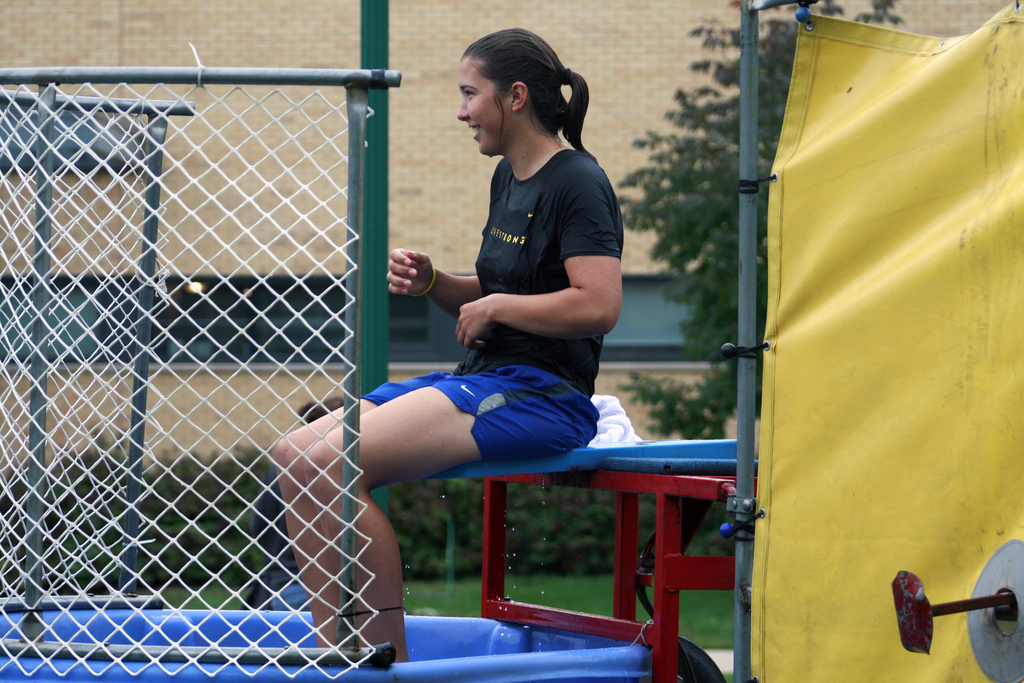
Woman Seated in an Easy Dunker Dunk Tank

There are many types and brands of dunk tanks commercially available. The Easy Dunker, manufactured by Twister Display, is likely the most common rentable dunk tank on the US market. It consists of a plastic tank, approximately four feet deep, and a plastic seat, around which is a plastic chassis which can be towed by a vehicle with a trailer hitch. Often there is a clear plastic window on the front of the tank so that the victim can be seen when he or she is dropped underwater. To the side of the tank is a circle target approximately one foot in diameter. Behind the target is a plastic tarp with a metal frame to catch balls which miss the target itself. The victim is also protected by a chain-link fence enclosure while waiting to be dunked. When the target is hit, the seat becomes disengaged from the chassis, dropping the victim into the tank. The seat-target mechanism, usually a vise grip that holds the seat in place by clamping down on a metal ring at the rear underside of the seat, and which is welded to the chassis so that the target shaft trips it when hit, must be reset afterwards, and the victim climbs back onto the seat using a molded step at the bottom rear of the tank and the chain-link enclosure and chassis for leverage.

Twister Display has since released an updated version of their dunk tank, called Easy Dunker 2. This newer model is similar in all aspects to the original, though there have been a few modifications. Whereas the original chassis had a platform flush to the seat on both sides, for the Easy Dunker 2 on one side the platform is lower, nearly flush to the top of the tank, forming a step that makes it easier to get onto the seat.

=== Metal Folding ===
The folding style dunk tank is manufactured in the USA by Hi Striker Co. Instead of a solid plastic tank, this dunk tank is made of metal panels that fold out on-site. Then a vinyl bladder drops into the center of the dunk tank to hold the water. The benefit of this style of dunk tank is requires much less space to transport to events. Whereas a standard Dunk Tank must be towed by a vehicle, this style dunk tank is only 4'x4'x1.5' when folded up, so it fits in the back of a pickup truck.

=== Other types ===
There is a smaller and shallower dunk tank, similar to the Easy Dunker. This type of tank works is a similar manner, but is often used in events where younger children might wish to participate in getting dunked. Additionally, there are several individual dunk tank designs. Among the dozens of variations are dunk tanks in which the victim is completely enclosed by a fenced enclosure; dunk tanks in which two or more people can be dunked at the same time; and dunk tanks where the target mechanism is tripped by unusual ways (e.g., making a golf hole, shooting a free throw, etc.) There are also dunk tanks where the seat runs sideways across the tank and is supported at one side by the target shaft, for some of these particular dunk tanks the seat splits apart in the middle, as seen in the movie Roustabout and the CHiPs episode entitled Boulder Wrap Party. There are also dunk tanks where instead of a traditional seat, the victim sits on a swing, as seen on Battle of the Network Stars which aired in the late 70's and early 80's.

== Events ==
=== Fundraising ===
Dunk tanks are often used by groups for fund raisers. For example, a group may rent a dunk tank for Shadow Of The City and have people volunteer to sit in a dunk tank. The public could then pay a small fee for the chance to dunk the volunteer victim. Common dunk tank victims include teachers, models, beauty queens, local celebrities, community leaders, and public figures.

=== Parties, carnivals, and picnics ===
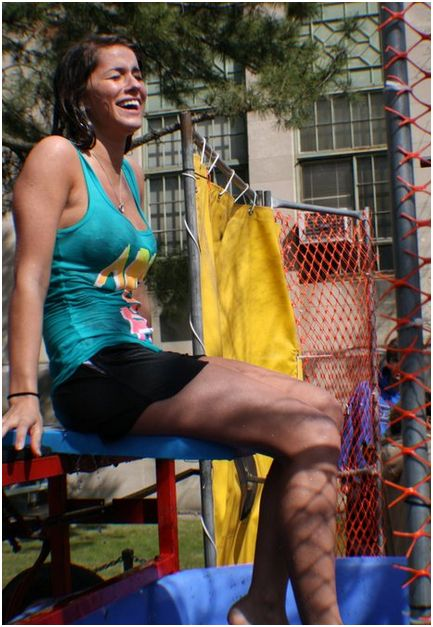
Seated in a Dunk Tank for Sorority Fundraiser

Dunk tanks are also frequently rented for events where people are not charged to dunk a volunteer. Schools, for example, may have teachers volunteer to get dunked as a reward for students at the end of the school year. "Free" dunk tanks are also common at church picnics, block parties, birthday parties, etc. Bars and night clubs will also rent dunk tanks and hire models or pay waitresses to sit in a dunk tank for promotional purposes. University Fraternity and Sorority parties and fundraisers are also common events with dunk tanks. In Thailand, dunk tanks are a popular attraction at Buddhist temple fairs for a game called sao noi tok nam (สาวน้อยตกน้ำ, literally little lady falling into water).

=== Nightclubs/pubs ===
Dunk tanks are used in some UK nightclubs. Normally centred on-stage as the focal point of an evening's entertainment. Clubbers can volunteer themselves or their friends for a soaking in the dunk tank, usually for a prize.

== Clothing ==
Depending on the type of event the dunk tank is being used for, the people being dunked may opt for various clothing options. People will often volunteer to get dunked fully clothed for a humorous effect. For example, school teachers, a boss at a company picnic, or local "celebrities" may choose to wear street clothes in the dunking booth for added effect. Some men even wear a suit and tie and some women wear a nice open collared button down shirt and skirt, or funny costumes in a dunk tank. Also, a group may choose to wear a special uniform while on the dunk tank. For example, youth group may wear a group T-shirt, or a Scouting group may choose to be dunked wearing their Scout uniforms.

If people know beforehand that they will be getting dunked, they often choose to wear a swimsuit or wetsuit while on the dunk tank. Other times, a person might dress up in a costume before taking their turn sitting in a dunk tank. At some fundraising events, women may be encouraged to just wear a bikini order to draw more men in to pay. Women will often wear bikinis and men will often wear only shorts because wet clothing sticking to the body makes the victim get colder—especially if dunk tank shifts last a prolonged period of time. In some night clubs, dunkees may just wear their underwear so as not to get their street clothes wet, and to attract attention from the desired sex. Dunk tanks are also an object of sexual fetish, as the experience is often seen as humiliating, embarrassing, and subjugating for the person sitting in a dunk tank.

While some dunk tank rental agencies recommend that footwear is worn when being dunked, most choose to simply go barefoot.

== Safety ==
Aside from cost, safety is the primary reason that a dunk tank would not be permitted at a given event. If the operator(s) is/are not fully trained or not giving the proper instructions there is a slight chance of injury when getting dunked, and people have been injured on occasion. General safety guidelines include keeping hands off any part of the tank assembly - some rental companies recommend keeping hands on your lap when sitting on a dunk tank. Grasping the seat could result in pinched fingers when the seat falls, and holding on to the side of the tank or enclosure could cause arm and shoulder injuries when falling in. There is also a slight risk of slipping on the bottom of the tank, so some rental companies recommend wearing shoes or sandals when getting dunked. However, most people prefer not to wear footwear in a dunk tank, and instead remember to "fall forward", to avoid hitting a body part on part of the tank assembly. In fact, many times volunteers are specifically instructed not to wear shoes, as they would like to keep the water in the tank clean. Additionally, following guidelines for the specific dunk tank being used will further prevent injuries. The possibility for injury has led to the creation of other alternatives as explained below.

=== Young children ===
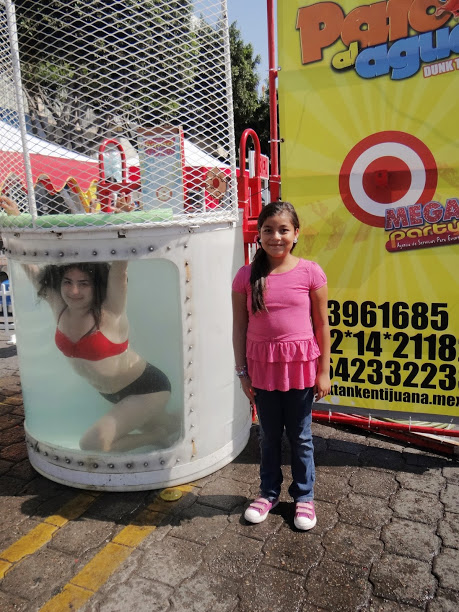
Child with a Dunk Tank

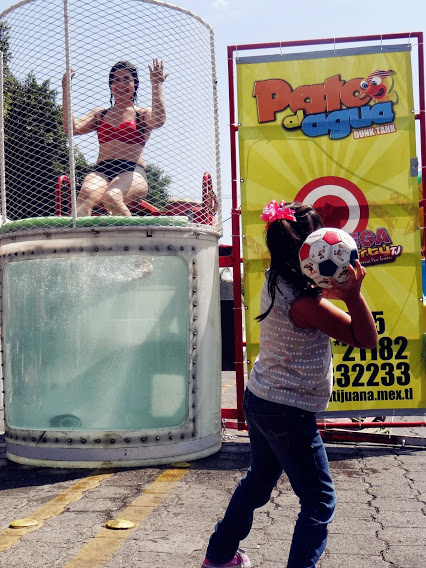
Child Throws Ball While Woman Waits to be Dunked

Quite often, young children wish to get dunked in a dunk tank. While many dunk tank manufacturers do not encourage or recommend younger children to sit in a dunk tank, children frequently participate in getting dunked (provided that they can swim), either as part of a fundraiser for a youth group, or at other events. Generally, children should not have a problem getting dunked, provided that they are taller than the tank is deep. A responsible adult should be supervising to ensure that the tank is operated safely, and that there is no horseplay. Many groups may require parent permission, whether verbally or through a signed waiver or permission slip to allow their children to sit in a dunk tank.

== Alternatives ==
Several alternatives to the dunk tank have been developed for a variety of reasons. Among them is a search for a safer product, which does not involve a collapsing seat, thus being more comfortable for both children and adults to participate in. Also, most alternatives use less water than a dunk tank, and some may even be used both indoors and outdoors. Alternative dunk tanks drop water on the volunteer, rather than having him or her fall into a tank of water. This is accomplished, for example, by an electric motor, by bursting a water balloon over the volunteer, or simply by overturning a bucket of water. Some devices can even be used to drop substances other than water on the victim - for example, confetti, slime,or mud. Given the advantages of these alternatives, the classic dunk tank is often considered to be more fun, a better crowd-pleaser, with the potential to net more profit in a fundraiser. In 2004, Wild Planet created a toy called the dunk seat, which is similar to a dunk tank, except the target is sprayed with water from a gardening hose.

Aquaventronics is a manufacturer of a number of dunk tank alternatives, including their patented Beat The Bucket game (US8702104 B2), and Pitch N' Pop game. Beat The Bucket is the world's first "Dunkee Defendable" dunk tank. The only game allowing a player the opportunity to control their fate; provided they have the reaction time and skill to do so. A single player stands behind the station and with the aid of a blocking arm, can defend the two targets from being hit. A second player throws waterlogged balls (or Juggle Balls, Tennis Balls, Nerf Balls, Wiffle Balls) while trying to hit the 2 targets. If the player using the blocker can act quickly enough, they can stop the ball from hitting the target. However, should the ball happen to strike a target, a cool, refreshing bucket of water is dumped from above. The bucket then automatically resets and fills with water, ready for the next defender.

== See also ==
- Ducking stool
