= Gator Panic =

1988 arcade game

- Japanese advertising flyer
- Developers: Namco; Hope (Wani Wani Panic 3)
- Publishers: JP: Namco; NA: Data East
- Series: Gator Panic
- Platforms: Arcade, mobile phone, iOS
- Release: JP: February 1988; NA: 1990
- Genre: Redemption
- Mode: Single-player

Gator Panic (Note: Also known as Wacky Gator or Wani Wani Panic (ワニワニパニック, Wani Wani Panikku)) is a redemption arcade game released in 1988 by Namco in Japan and Data East in North America. The game plays very much like Whac-A-Mole, but features alligators coming out of the cabinet horizontally instead of moles coming out vertically.

== Legacy ==
A digital remake was made in 2006 for Point Blank DS on the Nintendo DS, and retains the original design from the Japanese release. The game was digitally remade again in 2007 for Namco Museum Remix under the name Gator Panic Remix. This version has the player swing Pac-Man at the alligators by using the Wii Remote and Nunchuck; it was included again in Namco Museum Megamix which was released in 2010. An iOS version of Gator Panic was also released in 2010, but was removed from the app store on March 30, 2015. All digital versions of the game retain the title Gator Panic in regions outside Japan.

The game has had several sequels and revisions since the original's release:

- Kani Kani Panic AKA Cracky Crab (1991) - a similar title that uses crabs instead of alligators (naturally, they move sideways).
- Same Same Panic - (1994) - revised version featuring sharks instead of alligators.
- Wani Wani Panic 2 - (1996) - released in America in 2012 as Funky Gators.
- CR Wani Wani Panic - (2000) - Pachinko game.
- Wani Wani Panic RT - (2003)
- Wani Wani Panic 3 (2008)
- Whack'em Funky Gators (2016) - a digital remake of the game. It is known in Europe as Gator Panic.
- Wani Wani Panic R (2020)

In the 2021 JRPG Tales of Arise a mallet-like artifact called "Crocodile Crusher" can be found, with the in-game description saying it was "once used to beat back alligators" above a small trademark reference to Gator Panic.

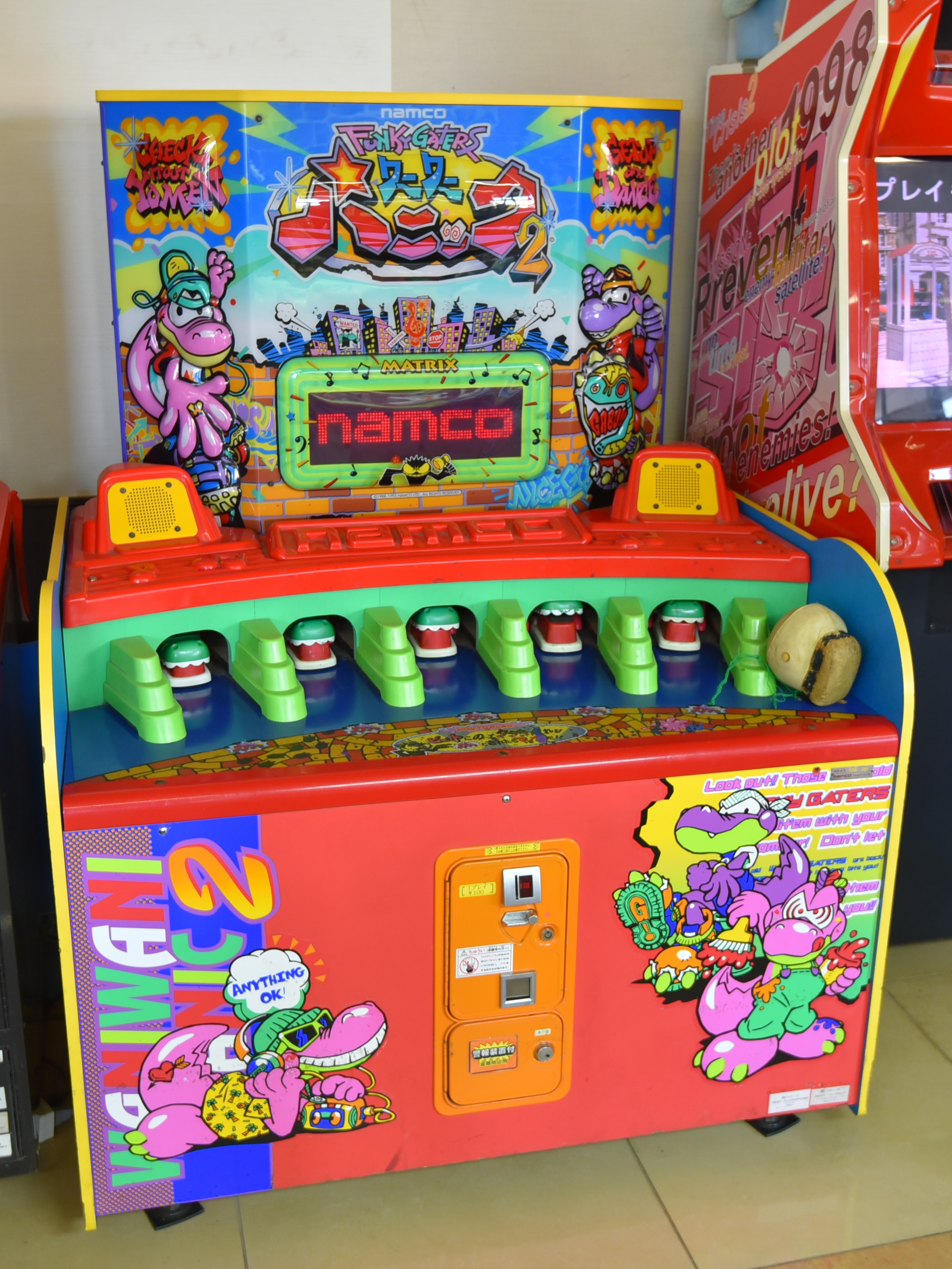
Wani Wani Panic 2

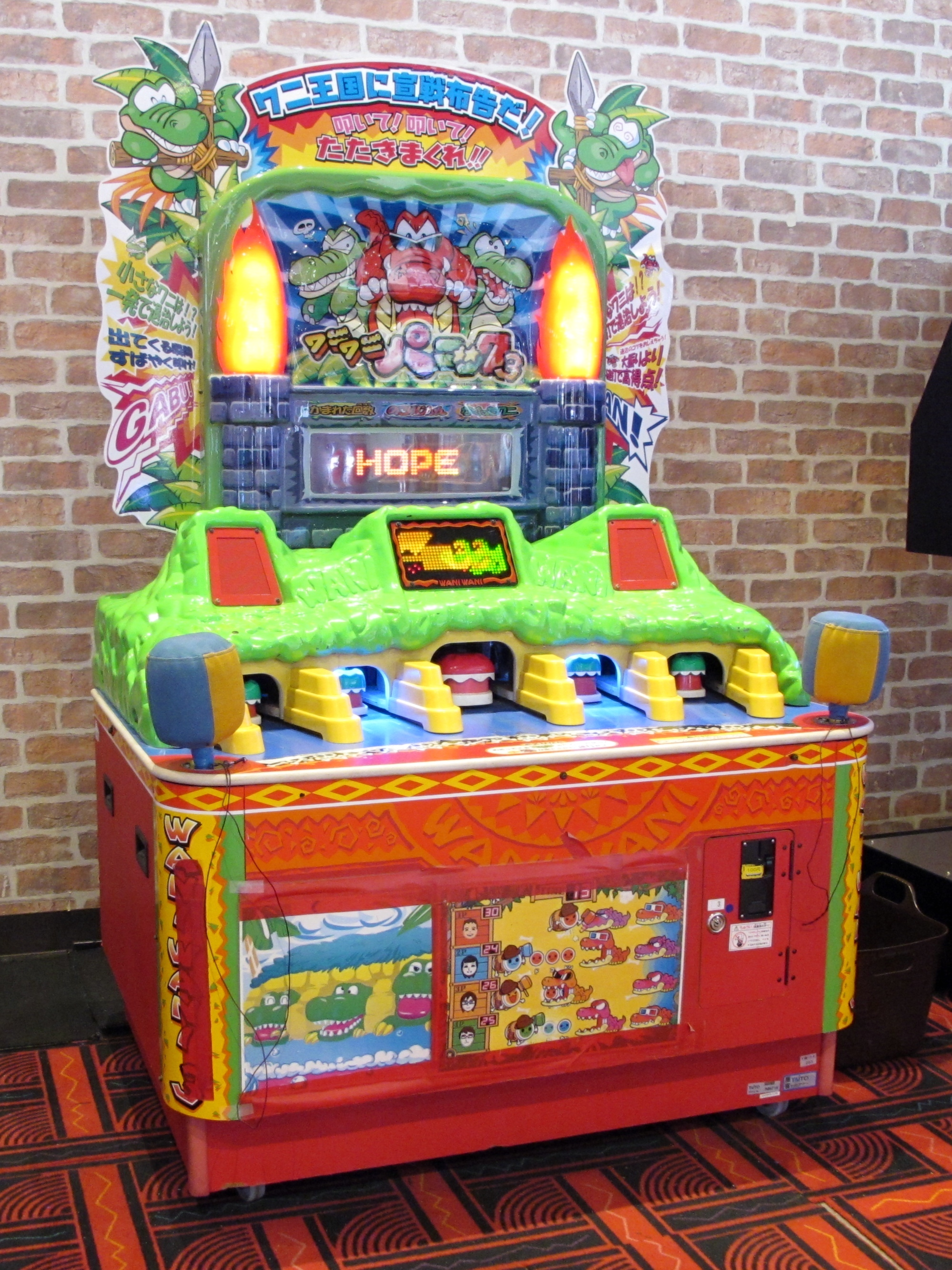
Wani Wani Panic 3
