= American Family Publishers =

American magazine subscriptions company

- Industry: Magazine subscriptions
- Founded: 1977
- Defunct: 1999
- Fate: Shut down
- Headquarters: Newark, New Jersey, United States
- Area served: United States
- Key people: President: Ms. Terry L. Rupp

American Family Publishers was a publishers clearinghouse company that sold magazine subscriptions in the United States. Founded in 1977, American Family Publishers (AFP) was one of America's leading marketers of magazine subscriptions. AFP was jointly owned by TAF Holdings, Inc. (a subsidiary of Time Inc.) and a group of private investors. It is best known for running sweepstakes in which a large amount of money was offered as the grand prize (in a range of several hundred thousand to one or more million dollars). The winner was chosen at random, by a professional auditing company, from among all who responded to the sweepstakes, regardless of whether a magazine subscription was purchased or not.

== History ==
Originally based in Newark, New Jersey, then Jersey City, New Jersey, the company's tactics attracted controversy, since the mailings that accompanied the sweepstakes promotions, which invariably included a form via which the recipient could purchase magazine subscriptions, frequently included language that seemed to indicate that the recipient had already won a prize, or was a finalist who had improved chances of winning a prize, when this was not the case.

In a related phenomenon connected to the company's promotion tactics, news stories reported cases of elderly Americans traveling to Florida (the company, at least for some time, routed their mail through St. Petersburg, Florida) in an effort to collect the money that they believed they had won, because of the promotional language contained in the sweepstakes entry forms (for instance, their frequently used phrase You may have already won $10,000,000!, although mitigated by an introductory line that stated "If you have the winning number...," led people to believe that they had already won the major prize).

Television exposé have also aired that claim to reveal, through garbology, that the entries of people who did not order magazines were thrown away rather than entered into a random drawing; however, AFP claimed that this came from a misunderstanding of how AFP processed entries at that time. Most of AFP's entry envelopes had windows on the back revealing an OCR code to identify the customer and sweepstakes, as well as any magazine subscription stamps on the entry form. If a stamp appeared in the proper window, the envelope was opened for further processing; if not, the envelope was scanned for entry in the sweepstakes, then thrown away unopened. A separate checkbox below the return address also allowed AFP to process address corrections without opening the envelope. Star Search host Ed McMahon was the original spokesperson for American Family Publishers from its start and starting in 1993, Dick Clark (who co-hosted TV's Bloopers & Practical Jokes on NBC with McMahon) later became co-spokesperson with McMahon.

These claims eventually led to litigation by the attorney general of several states against the company, resulting in court orders requiring changes in the way the company promoted the sweepstakes. The company complied, but increased lawsuits resulted in the company, which was 50% owned by Time, Inc., changing its name to American Family Enterprises. At that time, Time Inc. took a more hands-on role in the business, filing for bankruptcy in 1998.

== Competitors ==
Publishers Clearing House (PCH) was a competitor to American Family Publishers that ran similar sweepstakes. The two companies were often mistaken for each other. Many believe, incorrectly, that Ed McMahon was the spokesperson for PCH. Star Search host Ed McMahon worked only for American Family Publishers, according to a 1992 interview.The $25,000 Pyramid host Dick Clark was a spokesperson for AFP as well. PCH remains in business and promotes its products by means of sweepstakes, although it filed for Chapter 11 bankruptcy in 2025.
