= Publishers Clearing House =

American direct marketing company

- Type: Private
- Founded: 1953; 73 years ago
- Successor: ARB Interactive
- Headquarters: Jericho, New York, U.S.
- Revenue: ▼$38 million (2024); $841 million (2013)
- Number of employees: ▼105 (2025); 550 (2014)
- Website: www.pch.com

Publishers Clearing House (PCH) is an American company founded in 1953 by Harold Mertz. The company offered bulk mail direct marketing of periodicals (and later merchandise) as an alternative to door-to-door magazine subscription sales. Publishers Clearing House is most widely known for its sweepstakes and prize-based games, which were introduced in 1967. From August 2020 to March 2024, it owned the Wide Open Media publications Wide Open Spaces (about outdoors lifestyle), Wide Open Country (about country music), and FanBuzz (about sports).

PCH sweepstakes have been subject to legal action regarding whether consumers were misled about the odds of winning, and whether purchases improved their chances. By 2010, the company had reached settlements with all 50 states, and in 2023 the Federal Trade Commission ordered PCH to overhaul its sweepstakes processes. In 2025, PCH filed for Chapter 11 bankruptcy protection and its assets were acquired by ARB Interactive, an online sweepstakes company.

== History ==
=== Early history ===
Publishers Clearing House was founded in 1953 in Port Washington, New York by Harold Mertz, a former manager of a door-to-door sales team for magazine subscriptions. The company started in Mertz's basement with help from his first wife LuEsther and daughter Joyce. Its first mailings were of 10,000 envelopes from Mertz's home on Long Island, New York, and offered 20 magazine subscriptions. A hundred orders were received. Within a few years, the company moved out of Mertz's basement into an office building and started hiring staff. When PCH moved its headquarters in 1969, its prior location was donated to the city and renamed the Harold E. Mertz Community Center. The company's revenue had grown to US$50 million by 1981, and $100 million by 1988.

In 1967, PCH ran its first sweepstakes as a way to increase subscription sales, modeled after sweepstakes held by Reader's Digest. The first prizes ranged from $1 to $10 and entrants had a 1 in 10 chance of winning. After the sweepstakes increased response rates to mailings, prizes of $5,000 and eventually $250,000 were offered. PCH began advertising the sweepstakes on TV in 1974. It was the only major multi-magazine subscription business until 1977. Former client Time Inc. and several other publishers formed American Family Publishers (AFP) to compete with PCH after the company refused repeated requests by Time for a larger share of sales revenue from magazine subscriptions.

AFP and PCH competed for exclusive rights to magazines and for the better promotion and prize ideas. When AFP increased its jackpot to $1 million, and then to $10 million in 1985, PCH raised its prizes to match. PCH had distributed $7 million in prizes by 1979, $40 million by 1991, and $137 million by 2000. In 1989, two members of its advertising team, Dave Sayer and Todd Sloane, started the Prize Patrol, a publicized event where winners are surprised with a check at their home. The idea was inspired by the 1950s television series The Millionaire. The two companies were often mistaken for each other, with AFP spokespeople Ed McMahon and Dick Clark mistaken for representatives of the better-known PCH.

=== Government regulation and legal actions ===
Beginning in the 1990s, PCH and its primary competitor, AFP, experienced a series of lawsuits claiming that their mailings misled consumers about their odds of winning and implied that magazine purchases improved their chances. This led to the Deceptive Mail Prevention and Enforcement Act of 2000, which regulates direct mail businesses. At the Senate hearings regarding this Act, PCH claimed most consumers were not confused about their chances of winning or that purchases did not increase their chances. The company said that fewer than five percent of participants spent more than $300. However, government officials from California claimed 5,000 local consumers spent more than $2,500 each in magazine purchases under the false belief that they were increasing their odds of winning the sweepstakes.

Industry sources estimated that PCH's response rates decreased by 7 to 12 percent and its sales volume by 22 to 30 percent in response to negative publicity from these lawsuits. In 2000, PCH laid off a quarter of its 800-person workforce.

==== Lawsuits and settlements ====
In 1992, thousands of discarded sweepstakes entries from contestants who had not bought magazine subscriptions were found in the company's trash, reinforcing beliefs that the company favored those who made purchases in selecting a sweepstakes winner. PCH said this was done by a disgruntled employee at its mail processing vendor. A class action lawsuit ensued, which PCH settled by giving discarded entrants a second chance to win.

In 1994, PCH sent mailings telling recipients they were all "finalists", which led to a lawsuit involving the attorneys general of 14 US states. Later that year, PCH denied wrongdoing, but agreed to pay a settlement of $490,000 and to change its practices. Under the agreement, PCH said it would define terms like "finalist" and disclose the chances of winning.

In 1997, a contestant of competitor AFP flew to Tampa, Florida, thinking he had won, though he had not. The resulting publicity caused more lawsuits for both companies. PCH reached a $30 million national settlement in 1999. In 2000, another $18 million settlement was reached with 24 states, after the company sent mass mailings which said "You are a winner!" and used mock personalized checks. PCH agreed to avoid similar mailings in the future, and add a "sweepstakes fact box" to mailings.

Concerns about deceptive practices by PCH continued after this national settlement and the passing of the Deceptive Mail Prevention and Enforcement Act in 2000. State attorneys spoke out against the national settlement, and individual states filed additional lawsuits. Another $34 million settlement was reached in 2001 in a lawsuit involving 25 states, bringing the total settlements since 1999 to $82 million. As part of the settlement, PCH was required to avoid terms including "Guaranteed Winner," and to add disclaimers to mailings saying that the recipient had not yet won and that purchasing merchandise would not improve the chances of winning. PCH reached settlements with all 50 states and agreed to work with a "compliance counsel." PCH apologized in the settlement and said it would contact customers who had spent more than $1,000 on merchandise the prior year.

PCH reached another agreement with Iowa in 2007. In 2010, the company paid $3.5 million to the attorneys general of 32 states and the District of Columbia to settle possible contempt charges that it had violated the terms of the 2001 agreement. The company denied wrongdoing, but agreed to work with both an ombudsman and a compliance counsel who would review its mailings quarterly.

In April 2014, an investigation by the Senate Special Committee on Aging concluded that PCH had "pushed the limits" of federal law and legal settlements and that additional legislation might be needed, especially since the 2000 law did not cover email and other online communications.

Beginning in late 2021, PCH was hit with multiple new class action lawsuits, alleging that "Publishers Clearing House sells and rents mailing lists containing subscribers' personal information to a variety of third parties ... with each claiming the publishing company monetizes its subscribers' private information—including their names and addresses—without consent."

In June 2023, the Federal Trade Commission ordered PCH "to overhaul its sweepstakes entry and sales processes, stop surprise fees, and pay $18.5 million to consumers." At that time, the FTC also issued a consumer alert describing the deceptive practices in which PCH was found to engage.

=== Online development ===
Beginning in the 1990s, the company shifted its focus online. It began selling magazine subscriptions and merchandise on PCH.com in 1996. PCH acquired the assets of search company Blingo in 2006, online gaming company Funtank in 2010, mobile marketing company Liquid Wireless in 2012, and internet news aggregator Topix in 2019.

In 2006, PCH acquired Blingo Inc., an ad-supported metasearch engine that was later re-branded as PCH Search and Win. PCH ran contests on Twitter, Facebook, and Myspace, and developed iPhone apps for slot games and trivia. The company created online play-and-win sites like PCH Games (formerly Candystand) and PCHQuiz4Cash, with air-hockey and video poker games.

In December 2010, PCH acquired Funtank and its online gaming site Candystand.com. In 2011, PCH promoted a "$5,000 every week for life" sweepstakes in TV ads and the front page of AOL.com. The following year, the company acquired a mobile marketing company, Liquid Wireless. At times, the company utilized co-registration through other websites to expand its customer base.

In 2008, a PCH spokesperson said the digital properties were intended to attract younger consumers. By 2013, the internet had become PCH's primary channel of interaction with consumers. The New York Times described the digital transition as "part of an overall effort to collect information on Web users, show them advertisements and use the registration information for PCH's mailing lists."

=== Wide Open Media publishing ===
In 2020, PCH acquired digital publisher Wide Open Media Group, publisher of websites Wide Open Spaces, Wide Open Country, and FanBuzz.

These publications focus on particular topics. Wide Open Spaces is about outdoors lifestyle; the editorial director was Rachael Schultz, formerly of Insider and Hearst Communications. Wide Open Country focuses on country music, and is based in Nashville. The sports publication FanBuzz previously belonged to Cox Media Group.

According to Schultz, PCH ended its operation of Wide Open Media in March 2024.

=== Bankruptcy filing ===
On April 9, 2025, PCH filed for Chapter 11 bankruptcy protection in an effort to eliminate its mail-order and magazine businesses. The company reported approximately $40 million in debts to unsecured creditors, total liabilities exceeding $65 million, and less than $12 million in assets. On June 30, 2025, the online sweepstakes company ARB Interactive received court approval to acquire the assets for $7.1 million. Under the purchase agreement, ARB terminated payments to previous winners of PCH sweepstakes. The company plans to protect future winners through FDIC-insured escrow accounts.

== Products ==
The company's initial product was magazine subscriptions sold at a discount. Industry experts estimated that companies like PCH kept 75 to 90 percent of the fees from the original subscription, while publishers used the increased distribution to improve circulation numbers and revenue from renewals. PCH popularized the idea of using sweepstakes to sell magazine subscriptions through direct marketing, and became known by detractors as a producer of junk mail for advertising through mass-mailings. Documents filed with the New York Department of State in 1993 said that year the company mailed 220 million envelopes. Frequent buyers received 30 to 40 mailings a year.

PCH began selling merchandise in 1985 with two products. After a Hershey's Chocolate Cookbook and a diet cookbook sold more than other products, the company began expanding into jewelry, media, collectibles, household products, and others.

By the mid-2000's, the majority of the company's revenue came from merchandise sales. As late as 2019, PCH operated eight websites, including PCH Search and Win, PCH Lotto, PCH Games, PCH Save and Win, and Candystand.

In 2024, direct mail and product sales were discontinued.

== Sweepstakes ==
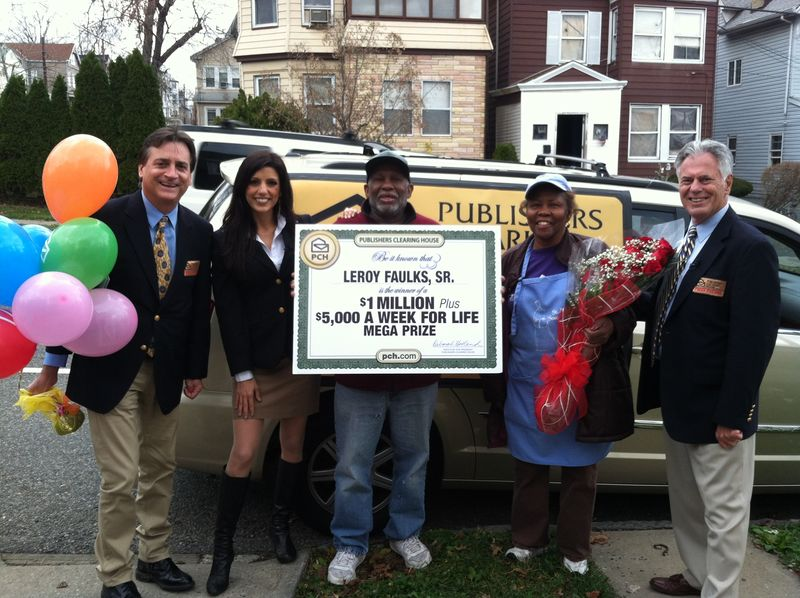
The Prize Patrol delivering an oversized check in 2011 to a sweepstakes winner for $1 million plus $5,000 a week for life

In 1995, PCH began the tradition of announcing winners of its $10 million prize just after the Super Bowl. By the time of its bankruptcy in 2025, the company had distributed more than $500 million in prizes. Some of its larger prizes have been for $5,000 a week for life, or for $10 million. Prizes can also range from $1 Amazon gift cards to $2,500, $1 million or $3 million. The larger cash prizes are paid in installments, typically with a balloon payment at 30 years, reducing the present value of prizes to much less than their nominal values. In August 2024, "early look" prizes were eliminated. The odds of winning "$5,000 a Week for Life" were 1 in 6.2 billion.

=== Prize Patrol ===
The Prize Patrol surprises sweepstakes winners with oversized checks for $1,000 to $10 million at their homes, workplaces, or other locations, capturing the event on video. Since their introduction in 1989, these videos have been used in widely broadcast television commercials, and, more recently, in the company's online acquisition efforts, websites and social media communications. In 2013, a $5 million television campaign modified the traditional prize patrol commercial by digitally altering video from classic sitcoms like The Brady Bunch and Gilligan's Island to show the prize patrol visiting characters in the show. Major winners are never contacted in advance; any letters, telephone calls, and social media messages claiming that a person may have already won a major prize, or claiming that they need to pay a fee to collect the prize, are always scams.

The Prize Patrol has made in-person appearances or delivered prizes on TV programs including The Oprah Winfrey Show, The Price Is Right, and Let's Make a Deal. Their surprise winning moments have been spoofed by Jay Leno, Conan O'Brien, and the cast of Saturday Night Live; woven into the plots of movies such as Let's Go to Prison, The Sentinel, and Knight and Day; and the TV series Early Edition. They have been the subject of cartoons.

=== Spokespeople ===
In the fall of 2017, Wayne Brady became a spokesperson for Publishers Clearing House in television and online advertising. In the summer of 2019, Steve Harvey made his debut in TV commercials and online advertising. In the spring of 2020, Terry Bradshaw was spokesperson and in the summer of 2020, Marie Osmond became a spokesperson. In the fall of 2020, Brad Paisley was featured as TV spokesperson for the company. In 2021, Terry Bradshaw returned in new commercials, and in late 2022 Steve Harvey came back for what would be the final Publishers Clearing House television advertising campaign in September 2022. Beginning in 2023, Publishers Clearing House ended their 50-year history of television advertising.

== Charitable giving ==
Prior to the 2025 bankruptcy filing and acquisition of assets by ARB, previous owners of Publishers Clearing House claimed that "Through charitable trusts created by our founders, more than 40% of the company profits benefit community organizations."

== See also ==
- List of New York companies
