= Wire loop game =

Game of physical skill

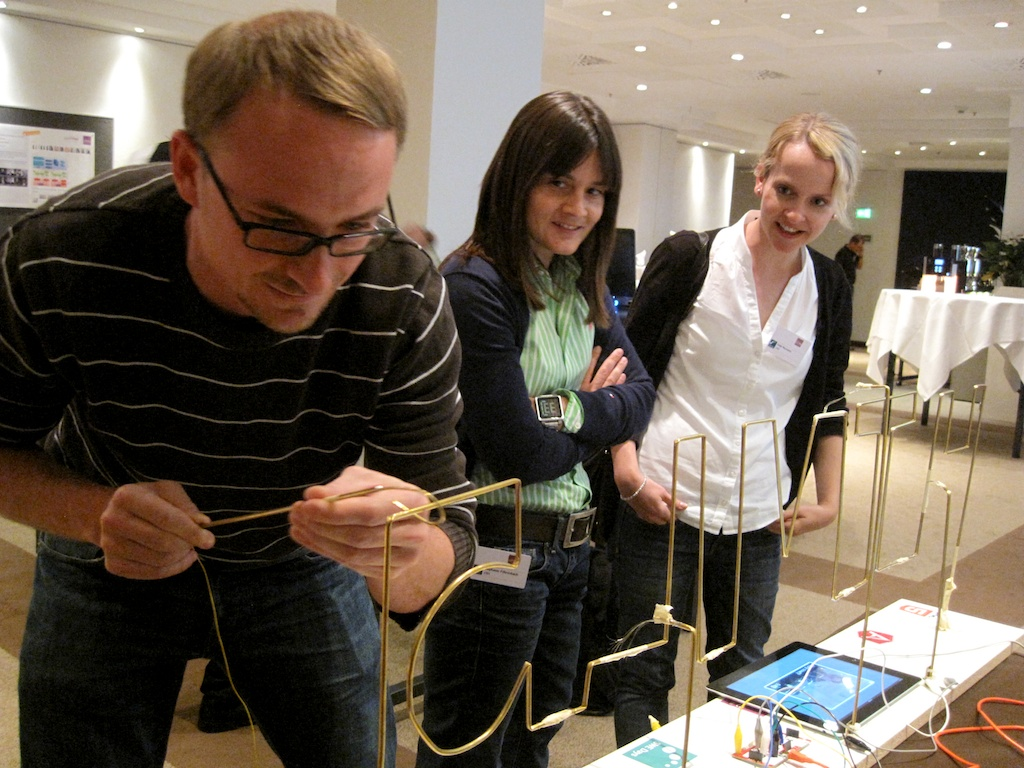
A man playing a version of the wire loop game.

A wire loop game, or buzz wire, is a game which involves guiding a metal loop (a 'probe') along a serpentine length of wire without touching the loop to the wire. The loop and wire are connected to a power source in such a way that, if they touch, they form a closed electric circuit. The circuit is connected to a light or sound-emitting device of some sort, so that when the loop and the wire touch, the light-emitting device will light up, and the sound-emitting device will make a sound, traditionally a buzzing noise. In commercial implementations of the game the wire is usually bent along a single axis.

This game is also called a steady-hand game or an electronic loop game.

== History ==
The electric buzz wire game was invented by Robert (Bob) Scrimshaw in Yorkshire in 1953. Bob was an electrician for RAF ground crew during WWII repairing planes, and was known as a very skilled electronic engineer. In 1953 Bob’s close friend John Waddington asked Bob if he could make a game for his garden party, and Bob created and brought along the ‘electronic loop game’. The game was a huge hit at the party, and John Waddington went on to patent Bob’s design before producing the first commercial ‘electronic loop game’ for sale from the mid 1950’s, through his Waddingtons Game Co.

== Types of buzz wire games ==
Desktop buzz wires are widely available for purchase. A giant version of the game also exists and it is typically used outdoors or as a garden game. More sophisticated buzz wires have also been developed, to incorporate digital technology to add features like automated scorekeeping and player ranking.

Virtual versions of this game exist, in which the pointer takes the place of the wire loop and must be guided down a narrow, twisting path without touching the sides. Both versions require well-developed hand–eye coordination. The difficulty of any particular game depends in part on the shape of the twisted wire and the size of the loop.
