= Whac-A-Mole =

Game of skill

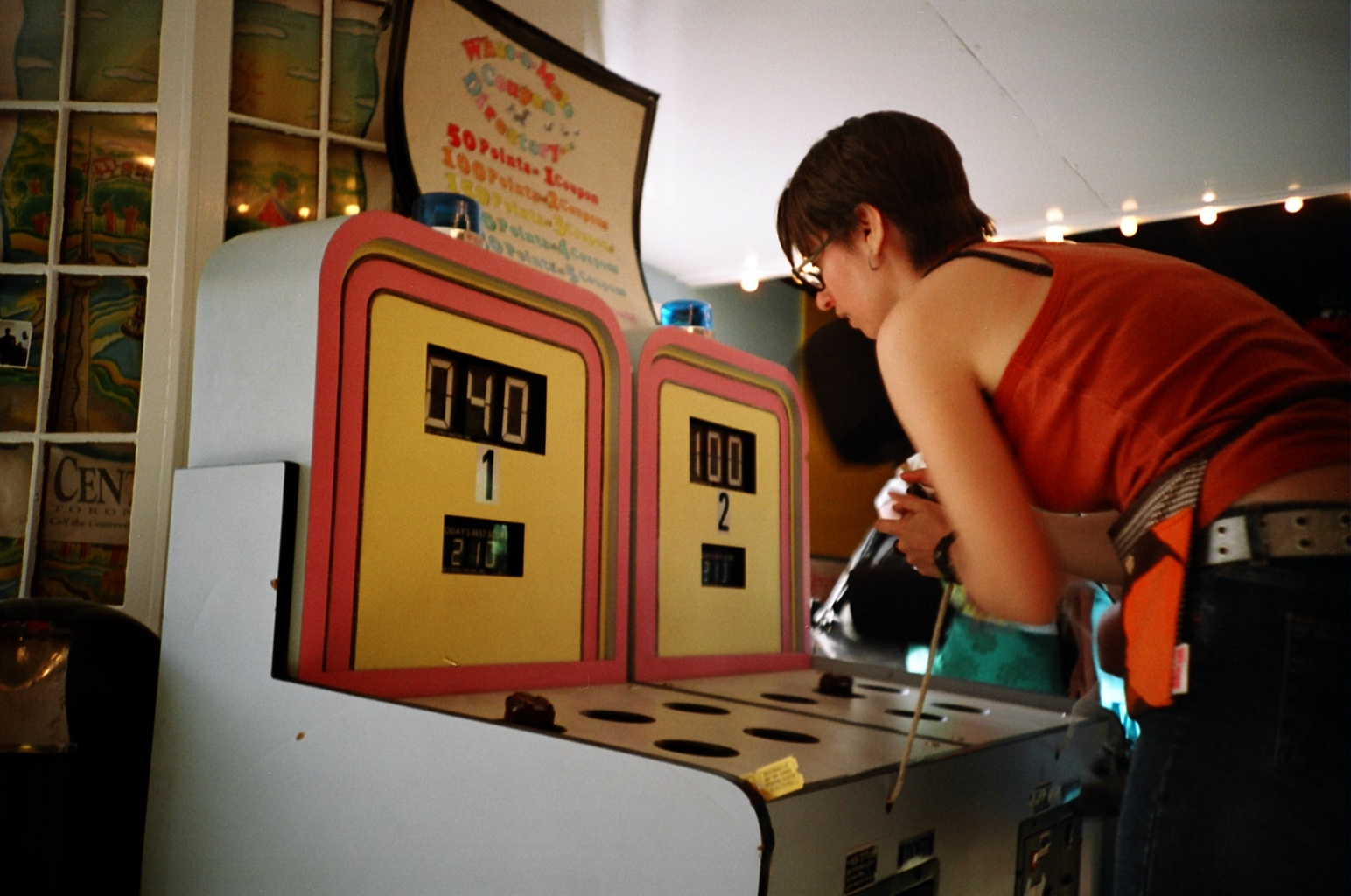
- A pair of Whac-A-Mole machines
- Manufacturers: TOGO (Mogura Taiji); Bandai (Mogura Tataki); Bob's Space Racers (Whac-A-Mole)
- Years active: 1975–2001 (Mogura Taiji); 1977–present (Mogura Tataki); 1977–present (Whac-A-Mole)

Whac-A-Mole or Whack-A-Mole is an arcade game that was created in 1975 by the amusements manufacturer TOGO in Japan, where it was originally known as Mogura Taiji (モグラ退治; "Mole Buster") or Mogura Tataki (モグラたたき; "Mole Smash").

A typical Whac-A-Mole machine consists of a waist-level cabinet with a play area and display screen, and a large, soft mallet. Five to eight holes in the play area top are filled with small, plastic, cartoonish moles, or other characters, which pop up at random. Points are scored by, as the name suggests, whacking each mole as it appears. The faster the reaction, the higher the score.

A child playing with a classic Japanese Whac-A-Mole machine.

== Play ==
The cabinet has a three-digit readout of the current player's score and, on later models, a "best score of the day" readout. The mallet is usually attached to the game by a rope to prevent it from being lost or stolen.

Current versions of Whac-A-Mole include three displays for Bonus Score, High Score, and the current game score. Home versions, distributed by Bob's Space Racers, have one display with the current score.

If the player does not strike a mole within a certain time or with enough force, it eventually sinks back into its hole with no score. Although gameplay starts out slow enough for most people to hit all of the moles that rise, it gradually increases in speed, with each mole spending less time exposed and with more moles exposed at once. After a designated time limit, the game ends, regardless of the player's score. The final score is based on the number of moles the player struck.

In addition to the single-player game described above, there is a multi-player game, most often found at amusement parks. In this version, there is a large bank of individual Whac-A-Mole games linked together, and the goal is to be the first player to reach a designated score (rather than hitting the most moles within a certain time). In most versions, striking a mole is worth ten points, and the winner is the first player to reach a score of 150 (15 moles). The winner receives a prize, typically a small stuffed animal, which can be traded up for a larger stuffed animal should the player win again.

Game play options have become more adjustable, allowing the operator/owner to selectively alter the high score, hits points, rate of progressive speed, and game time.

The game is still used for teaching auditory processing and attention.

== History ==
Mogura Taiji was invented in 1975 by Kazuo Yamada of TOGO, based on ten of the designer's pencil sketches from 1974. TOGO released it as Mogura Taiji to Japanese amusement arcades in 1975. It became a major commercial success in Japan, where it was the second highest-grossing electro-mechanical arcade game of 1976 and again in 1977, second only to Namco's popular arcade racing game F-1 in both years. Mogura Taiji was licensed to Bandai in 1977. Bandai (now part of Bandai Namco Holdings) introduced the game to the Japanese home market as a toy in 1977, called Mogura Tataki (モグラたたき; "Mole Smash"); it was a major hit by 1978, selling over 1 million units. In the late 1970s, arcade centers in Japan were flooded with similar, derivative "mole buster" games. Mogura Taiji has since been commonly found at Japanese festivals.

Mogura Taiji made its North American debut in November 1976 at the International Association of Amusement Parks and Attractions (IAAPA) show, where it drew attention for being the first mallet game of its type. Gerald Denton and Donny Anderson saw it and saw great potential for converting it into a carnival game by putting it in a trailer. Denton showed the game to Aaron Fechter and assigned him the task of building their own version of the game. Fechter coined the name "Whac-A-Mole" and added air cylinders "so that when air pushed up the moles, the air acted as a cushion". He developed the prototype in 1977, and Denton and Anderson presented it to the founder of Bob's Space Racers, Bob Cassata, that year. After Bob made further refinements, Bob's Space Racers began selling the game in 1977. In 1978 it debuted at a midway exhibition show, where it was the most popular game. The following year, it debuted at pinball parlours. In 1980, it was sold in the carnival, amusement park and coin-op arcade markets. Whac-A-Mole has since become a popular carnival game.

Back in Japan, Namco, who were beginning to shift towards arcade video game production with hits like Galaxian (1979) and Pac-Man (1980), noticed arcade centers in Japan were flooded with "mole buster" games. To capitalize on their popularity, Namco began work on a similar game with a unique motif to help it stand out from similar games. Sweet Licks (1981) was originally designed by TOGO, who had originally named it Mole Attack. Namco purchased the rights to the game and gave it new artwork. Sweet Licks was designed by Yukio Ishikawa, a mechanical game designer for Namco. The game was themed around cake and pastries to help attract women. It was the first arcade game to use an LCD monitor to display the player's score. Sweet Licks became popular in Japan and was subsequently released in North America in April 1982, then in Europe, where it became popular in the 1980s.

As of 2005, Bob's Space Racers generated $1,500,000,000 (equivalent to $2,500,000,000 in 2025) revenue from Whac-A-Mole machines in amusement parks. The same year, Hasbro secured licensing rights for Whac-A-Mole machines in the home consumer market.

== Variations ==
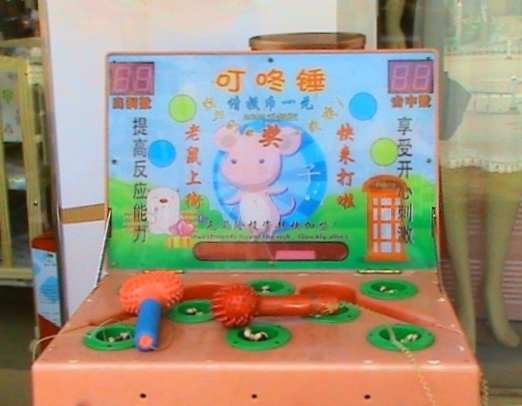
Whac-A-Mole machine for small children in Hainan, China.

The original Whac-A-Mole game inspired the first genre of games with a violent aspect as central to their user experience. Researchers have used Whac-A-Mole and its variations to study the violent aspects of these games.

The Whac-A-Mole game trademark was originally owned by Bob's Space Racers but since 2008 has been owned by Mattel. Machines with similar gameplay are sold under other names. Whac-A-Mole has also been the basis for a number of internet games and mobile games that are similar in play and strategy.

Engineer Tim Hunkin built and installed a "Whack a Banker" machine at Southwold Pier in England in 2009 made from parts of a previous "Whack a Warden" machine.

== Design ==
The moles are mounted on rods and raised by a lever and crank system. When the user strikes the mole, a microswitch is activated by a pin housed within the mole and the system lowers the mole.

The timing of the moles was originally controlled by tones from an audio tape which then drove an air cylinder system.

== Colloquial usage ==
The term "whac-a-mole" (or "whack-a-mole") is often used colloquially to refer to a situation characterized by a series of futile, Sisyphean tasks, where the successful completion of one just yields another popping up elsewhere.

In computer programming/debugging it refers to the prospect of fixing a bug causing a new one to appear as a result. In an Internet context, it refers to the challenge of fending off recurring spammers, vandals, pop-up ads, malware, ransomware, and other distractions, annoyances, and harm.

In law enforcement it refers to criminal activity popping up in another part of an area after increased enforcement in one district reduces it there.

In a military context it refers to ostensibly inferior opposing troops continuing to appear after previous waves have been eliminated.

It has also been applied to fake news, where as soon as one story is debunked another appears elsewhere – or sooner.

== See also ==
- Gator Panic
- Pop-up Pirate
- Simon
- Splat the rat
- Sweet Licks
