= Shoot the Freak =

Attraction at New York City's Coney Island

Coordinates: 40.5740°N 73.9803°W

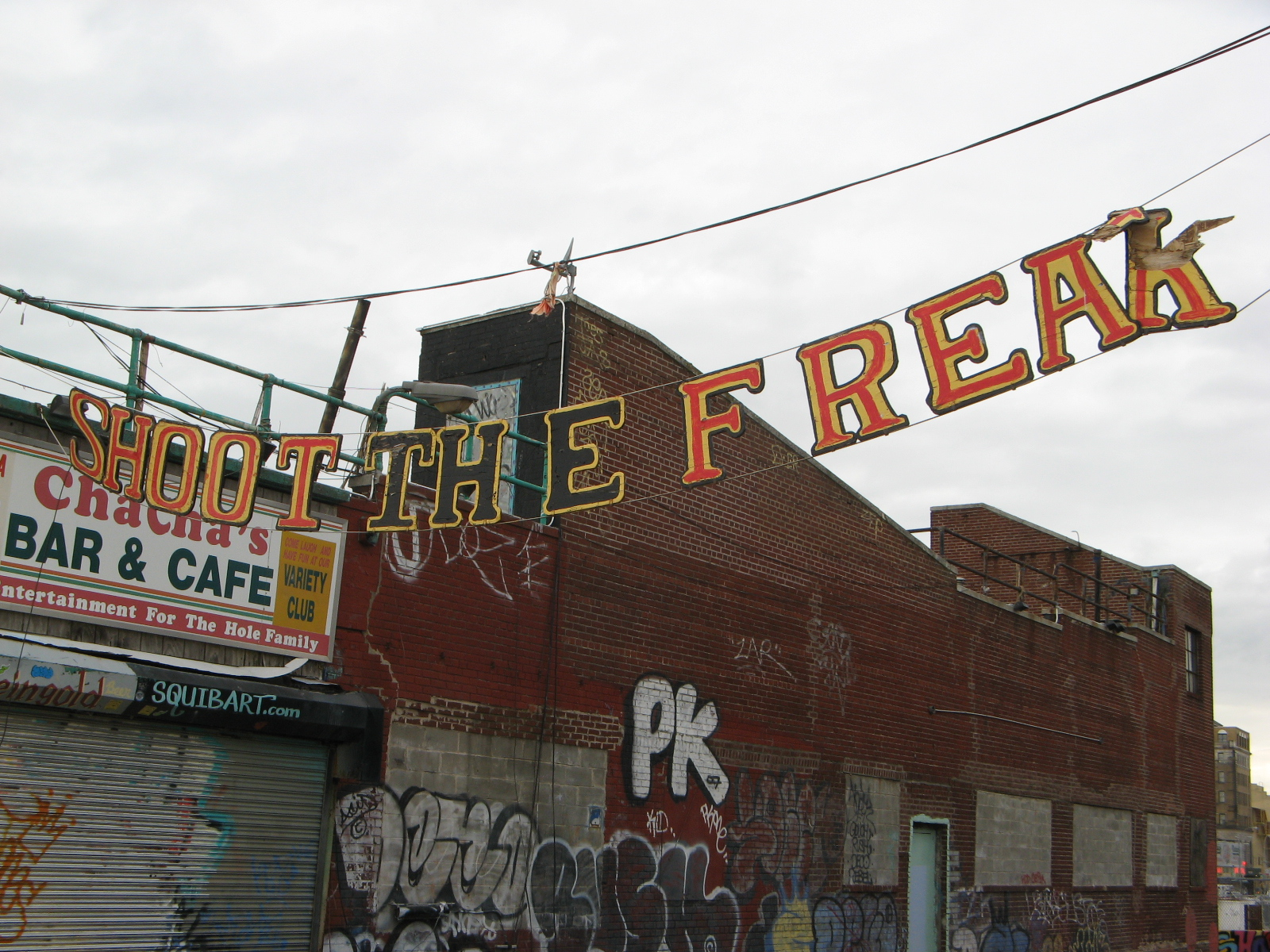
Signage for the attraction, from 2010

Shoot the Freak was an attraction on the Riegelmann Boardwalk at Coney Island, Brooklyn, New York City, that operated from 2000 until its demolition in 2010. The game was located on West Boardwalk in Coney Island. The game was considered one of the distinctive attractions of Coney Island. A successor, called Shoot the Clown, opened in a different location on the Boardwalk in 2013.

== Game play ==
The game consisted of a raised platform above a yard filled with obstacles and other objects. A high concrete wall defined the back end of the yard; the walls of adjacent buildings defined the side boundaries. A carnival barker would draw passersby to play the game, using trademark calls of "C'mon, ya pineapple!" Players would fire paintball rifles from the platform at human targets in the yard below. Playing the game required purchase of ammunition from the proprietor. The targets (the "freaks") were unarmed, wore plastic armor, and would taunt and insult the players while dodging paintball fire. No prizes were awarded and there was no scoring system.

== Demolition ==
As part of its contract with the New York City government to reconstruct and modernize Coney Island and create a new park called Luna Park, the Italian firm Zamperla tried to coerce several existing Coney Island boardwalk attractions to close or relocate, and Shoot the Freak was among those that refused. Over the 2010 winter holidays, Shoot the Freak was bulldozed without proper permits and sealed off. The owner and operator of Shoot the Freak was Anthony Berlingieri, who also owned Beer Island, another Boardwalk business that had been threatened with eviction by Zamperla. Berlingieri had been battling Zamperla in court and had been formally served eviction papers on November 1, 2010, but the eviction had been stayed on appeal and court hearings were not yet under way. Zamperla was fined for the illegal action.

== Shoot the Clown ==
After Superstorm Sandy decimated Coney Island in October 2012, proprietors scrambled to replace the attractions that had been destroyed for the following spring. The old Derby Racer space, on Bowery Street in Coney Island, became the site of Shoot the Clown. The rules, layout and setup of Shoot the Clown are identical to those of Shoot the Freak. The proprietor of Shoot the Clown is Caesar, the operator of a number of other attractions.

== In popular culture ==
- In the game Grand Theft Auto IV, a non-playable storefront in Firefly Island in Broker is called "Shoot Em Down." The sign is in the same style as Shoot the Freak's sign.
