= Sweepstakes parlor =

A sweepstakes parlor (or sweepstakes café) is an establishment that gives away chances to win prizes with the purchase of a product or service, typically internet access or telephone cards. They began to appear in the Southern United States sometime around 2005, and quickly proliferated. Purchased entries are redeemed using computers at the establishment, which contain specialized software that presents whether a participant has won a prize. Results are often presented using mechanisms that resemble casino games, such as slots, and the facility itself may contain casino motifs in their overall decor.

There is controversy associated with the operation of such businesses and whether or not they violate anti-gambling laws. Operators and the companies that provide the systems used maintain that they operate in accordance with laws governing promotions and sweepstakes, but critics of sweepstakes parlors have argued that these establishments are designed to exploit technicalities to skirt gambling laws, and that their patrons are more interested in using the facilities for gambling than actually using the services that they had purchased. Multiple U.S. states have enacted laws designed to ban or restrict the operations of sweepstakes parlors.

== Business model ==
A sweepstakes parlor sells a service or product, usually internet access or telephone cards. When a purchase is made, a number of chances to win prizes are given to the consumer. Proponents compare this practice to similar promotional giveaways by other businesses, such as McDonald's' Monopoly promotion, which are legal in most areas. In one example of a sweepstakes parlor that sells phone cards, the operator gives away 100 chances for every dollar spent on a phone card. Chances may also be given without a purchase just for coming into the establishment.

Sweepstakes parlors are most often located in or adjacent to strip malls. (Note: The website for the promoter SweepsCoach spells it out: "Look for a place near your customers. Lower to middle income spots are great. Strip malls are great. The kinds of businesses you may want to be near include Wal-Mart, check cashing businesses, pawn shops, maybe slightly seedy but still safe.") Computer terminals are set up inside the parlors, where patrons can see if they have won a prize by playing a casino-style game, similar to a video slot machine. The decor of the cafes may also include casino-inspired elements and motifs.

The software necessary to operate a sweepstakes parlor may be obtained from one of a number of companies; in return for providing the software, a percentage of the profits is typically paid. There are also installation companies that provide assistance in setting up cafes.

== Legal challenges ==
Sweepstakes parlors have attracted scrutiny from law enforcement, and local and state legislators. In at least 20 states, the legality of the cafes has faced challenges in the form of criminal complaints, lawsuits, and bans. The industry formed lobbies to protect and promote their legal interests. The industry has maintained, at times successfully, that the business model and the systems used do not meet the legal definition of gambling in the US. The federal definition characterizes gambling as meeting three criteria: consideration, prize, and chance. Sweepstakes parlor operators have contended that the prizes are predetermined, and therefore the system does not meet the criterion of chance. They have also held that chances are given even without purchase, and therefore the criterion of consideration is not met.

In 2013, sweepstakes parlors were banned in Florida, Ohio and several California municipalities. Cases pertaining to the parlors reached the state supreme courts of both Alabama and North Carolina. In Alabama, one operator's sweepstakes model was found to be in violation of state gambling laws; the court agreed with District Attorney Barber that the system used fit the description of a slot machine, that chance occurred at the point of sale, and that consideration was not negated even though it was possible to obtain free chances. In North Carolina, the industry argued that a statute prohibiting sweepstakes from using an "entertaining display" violated their First Amendment rights, but the North Carolina Supreme Court disagreed and upheld the ban. In Texas in 2013, the attorney general announced that HEST Technologies pleaded guilty to engaging in organized criminal activity for gambling offenses.

The sweepstakes industry however, attempted to work around these restrictions by restyling their games; in North Carolina, sweepstakes software providers implemented "pre-reveal" mechanisms, which attempted to comply with the prohibition of "entertaining displays" by revealing the player's prize in plain text before the game is played. In October 2013, two Florida sweepstakes parlors reopened as charity bingo parlors (which are legal under state law), but also offering electronic pull-tabs ("instant bingo"). In December 2013, following a report on them by the Sarasota Herald-Tribune, the two locations were issued subpoenas by police requesting access to their financial records. Rather than comply, the two locations voluntarily shuttered instead.

In May 2015, federal prosecutors announced that they had agreed to a settlement with five sweepstakes software providers, under which they would stop doing business in North Carolina by July 1, 2015.

Since 2017, online platforms have offered sweepstakes-based casino-style games using virtual currencies, typically through dual‑currency models, which falls outside traditional gambling statutes. These services operate under promotional sweepstakes laws, which differ from traditional gambling laws.

In response, New York passed legislation restricting the operation of such platforms. By mid‑2025, regulators in states including Connecticut, Michigan, Maryland, West Virginia, Louisiana, and New Jersey had issued cease‑and‑desist notices or enacted legislation targeting sweepstakes casinos, reflecting a coordinated regulatory crackdown. Tennessee Attorney General Jonathan Skrmetti then issued cease-and-desist orders to several sweepstakes casinos in December 2025.

=== Other opposition ===
Advocates for legal gaming also object to the parlors on the grounds that they are unregulated. They argue, among other things, that the sweepstakes parlors encroach on the business of state-run lotteries and licensed gambling, thus reducing the alleged benefits to public programs that get a portion of funds from legal gambling. In addition, in states where a compact exists under the Indian Gaming Regulatory Act, if sweepstakes parlors are not made illegal they may continue to conflict with the compact.

Florida's sweepstakes parlor ban also had a chilling effect on arcades; the law prohibits devices defined as "gambling machines" from awarding prizes more than $0.75 in value and accepting cards or bills as payment. Although the law does contain specific distinctions meant to exclude arcade redemption games from its scope, the law attracted concern from executives within the arcade industry, who felt that it could be interpreted to ban their operation—especially at facilities that use card-based systems for credits rather than tokens. In January 2015, as a cautionary measure, Disney Parks removed redemption and claw machines from the arcades of its Florida resorts: representatives of the company have supported attempts to clarify the wording of the sweepstakes parlor ban to reduce its potential effects on arcades.

== See also ==
- Pachinko
