= Betting parlour =

A betting parlour is a location where people gather to place bets (often with a bookmaker or pari-mutuel operator).

In jurisdictions where betting is illegal, or legal only in regulated places, a betting parlour may be an illicit establishment.

In jurisdictions where betting is legal, it may refer to an area at a racecourse or an off-track betting venue (typically for horse or dog racing), a sports betting area inside a stadium or casino, or a dedicated betting shop.
