= Parking =

Act of stopping and disengaging a vehicle and usually leaving it unoccupied

External videos
- Q&A interview with Henry Grabar on Paved Paradise, June 11, 2023, C-SPAN

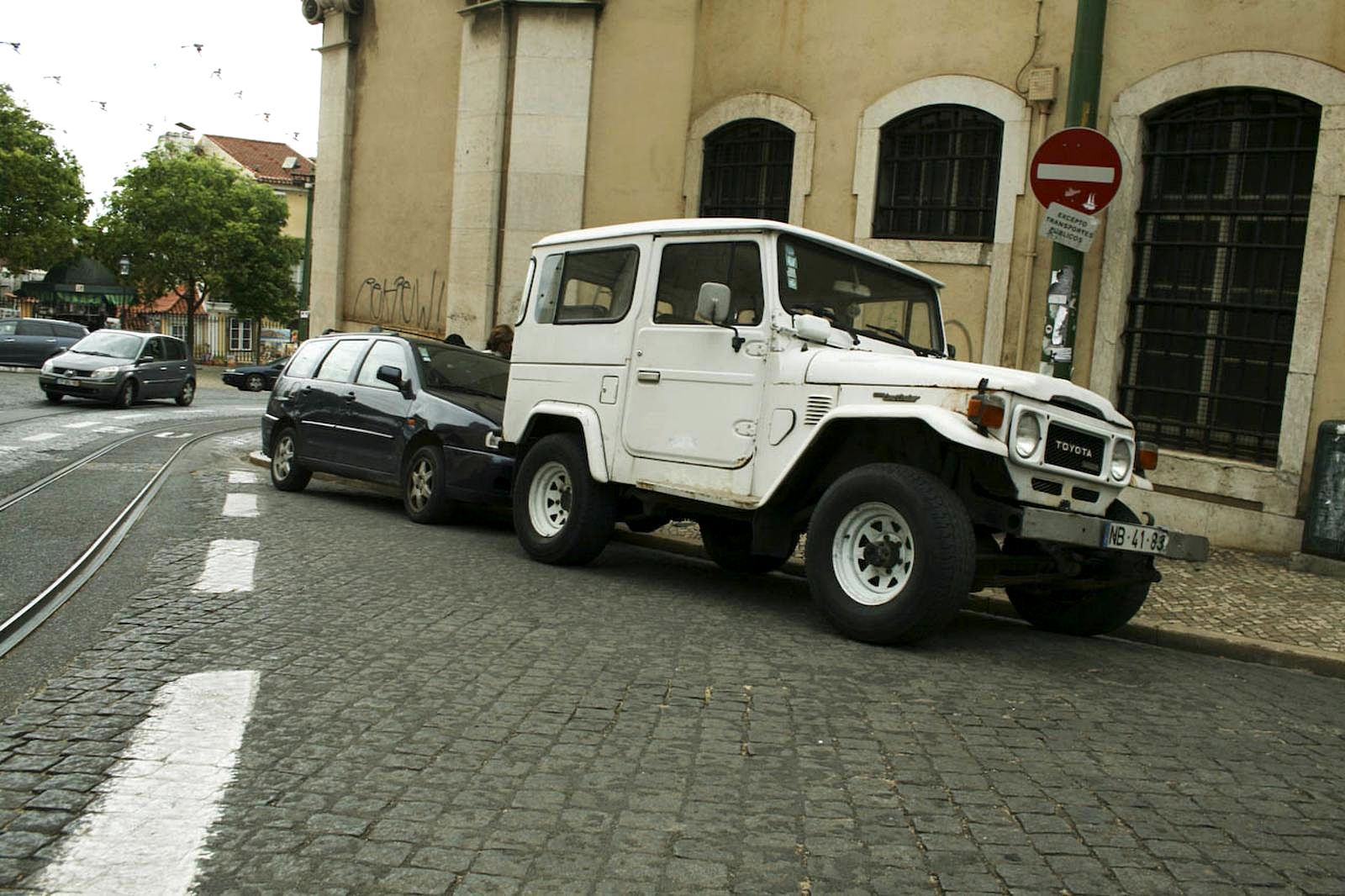
Cars parked at the side of the street

Parking is the act of stopping and disengaging a vehicle and usually leaving it unoccupied. Parking on one or both sides of a road is often permitted, though sometimes with restrictions. Some buildings have parking facilities for use of the buildings' users. Countries and local governments have rules for design and use of parking spaces.

Car parking is essential to car-based travel. Cars are typically stationary around 95 percent of the time. The availability and price of car parking may support car dependency. Significant amounts of urban land are devoted to car parking; in many North American city centers, half or more of all land is devoted to car parking.

== Parking facilities ==
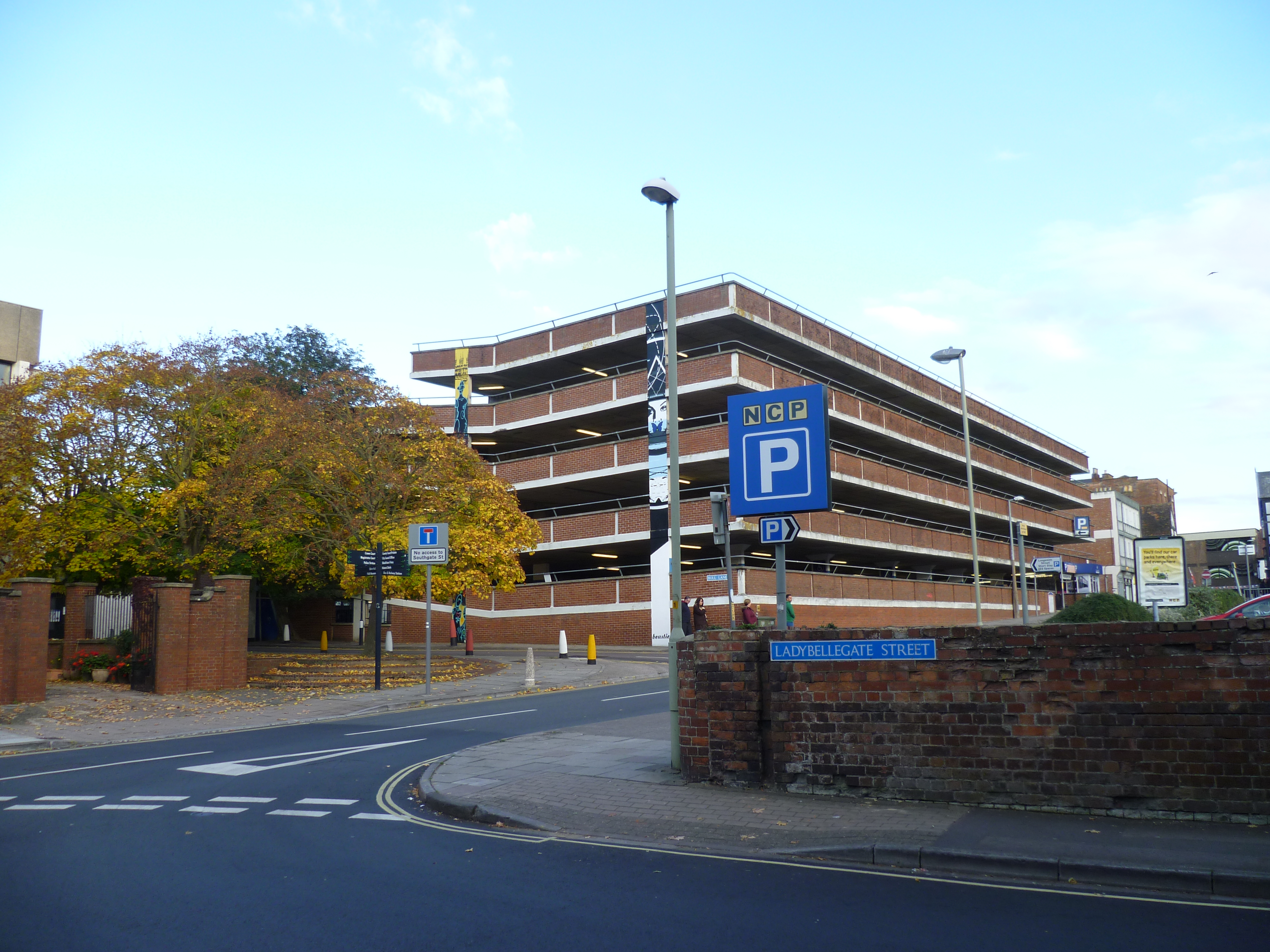
A parking garage in Gloucester, England

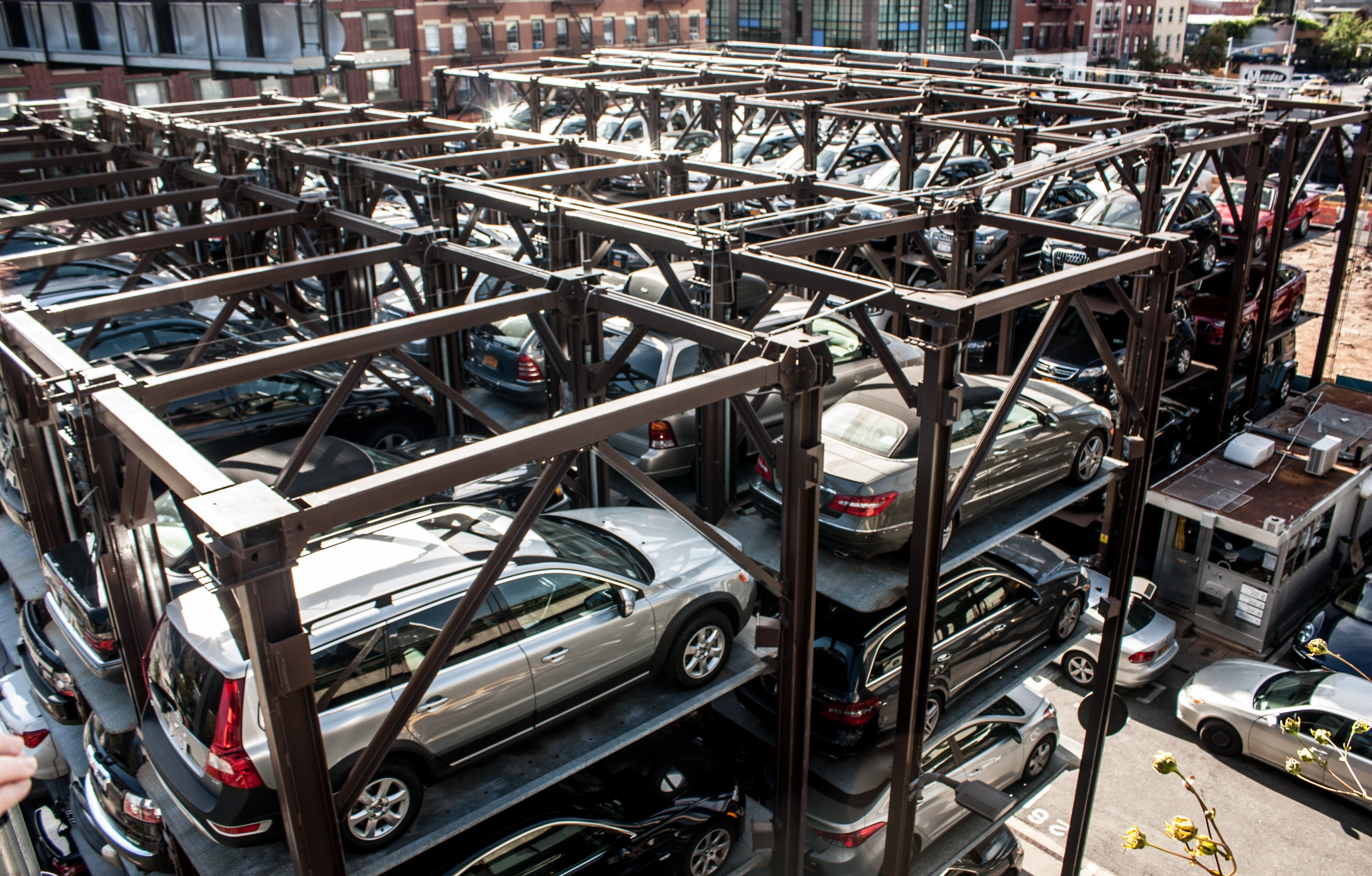
Parking lot in New York City with capacity multiplied by stacking with lifts

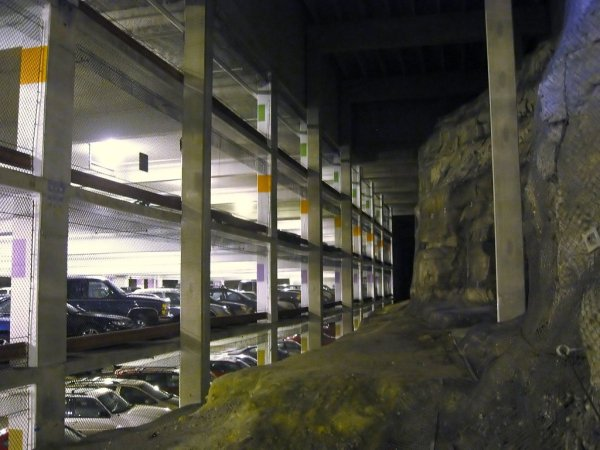
An underground parking garage at the University of Minnesota

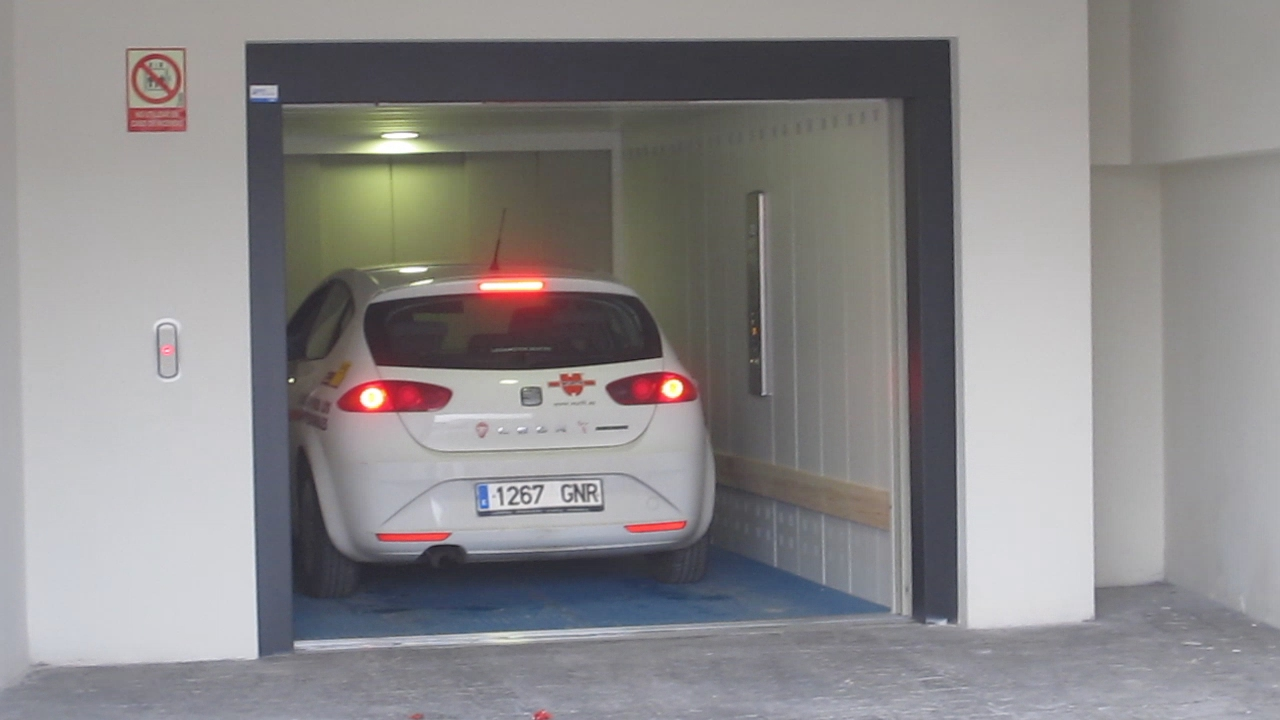
A car elevator in a parking garage

Parking facilities can be divided into public parking and private parking.

- Public parking is managed by local government authorities and available for all members of the public to drive to and park in.
- Private parking is owned by a private entity. It may be available for use by the public or restricted to customers, employees or residents.

Such facilities may be on-street parking, located on the street, or off-street parking, located in a parking lot or parking garage.

=== On-street parking ===
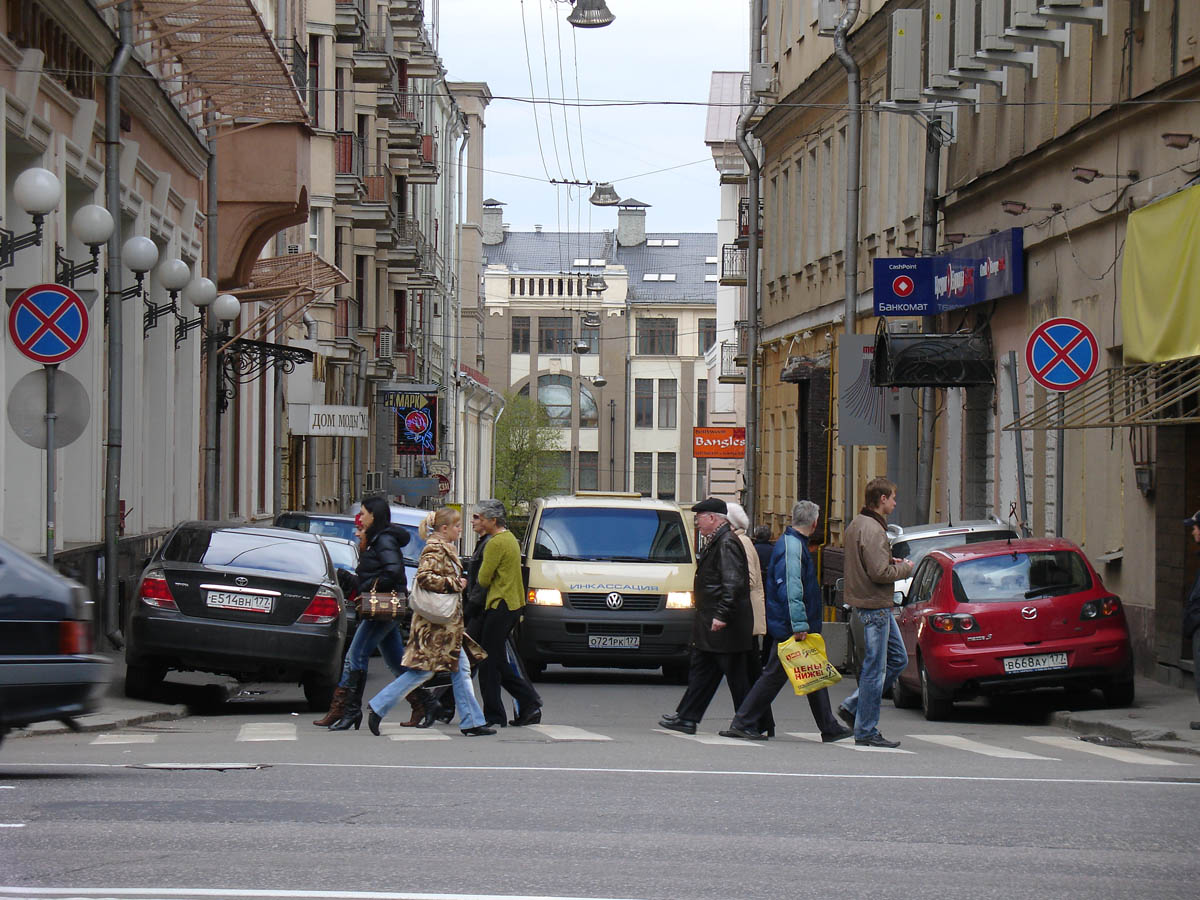
Cars parked on the sidewalk in Moscow.

On-street parking can come in the form of curbside or central parking.

Curbside parking may be parallel, angled or perpendicular parking. Parallel parking is often considered a complicated maneuver for drivers; however uses the least road width.

On-street parking can act as inexpensive traffic calming by reducing the effective width of the street.

On-street parking may be restricted for a number of reasons. Restrictions could include waiting prohibitions, which ban parking in certain areas; time restrictions; requirements to pay, e.g., at a parking meter or using a pay by phone facility, or a permit zone, restricting parking to permit holders – often residents – only. Parking restrictions may be applied across a whole zone using a controlled parking zone or similar.

On-street parking is often criticised for being a bad use of high-value public space, especially where parking is free. In some cities, authorities have replaced parking spaces with Parklets.

=== Parking lots and garages ===
Parking lots (or car parks) generally come in either a structured or surface regime.

Structured regimes are buildings in which vehicles can be parked, including multi-storey parking garages, underground parking, or a hybrid of the two. Such structures may be incorporated into a wider structure.

In the U.S., after the first public parking garage for motor vehicles was opened in Boston, May 24, 1898, livery stables in urban centers began to be converted into garages. In cities of the Eastern US, many former livery stables, with lifts for carriages, continue to operate as garages today.

Surface regimes involve using a clear lot to provide a single level of parking. This may be a stand-alone car park or located around a building.

There is a wide international vocabulary for multi-storey parking garages. In the Midwestern United States, they are known as parking ramps. In the United Kingdom, they are known as multi-storey car parks. In the Western US, they are called parking structures. In New Zealand, they are known as parking buildings. In Canada and South Africa, they are known as parkades.

=== Fringe parking ===
Fringe parking is an area designated for parking, typically located on the outskirts of a central business district (CBD) or just outside a city centre. It is primarily used by suburban residents who commute to urban areas for work, shopping, or other activities.

These parking areas help reduce congestion in downtown areas by encouraging park-and-ride systems, where commuters leave their vehicles in fringe car parking lots and continue their journey using public transport, shuttles, or walking routes.

=== Park and ride ===
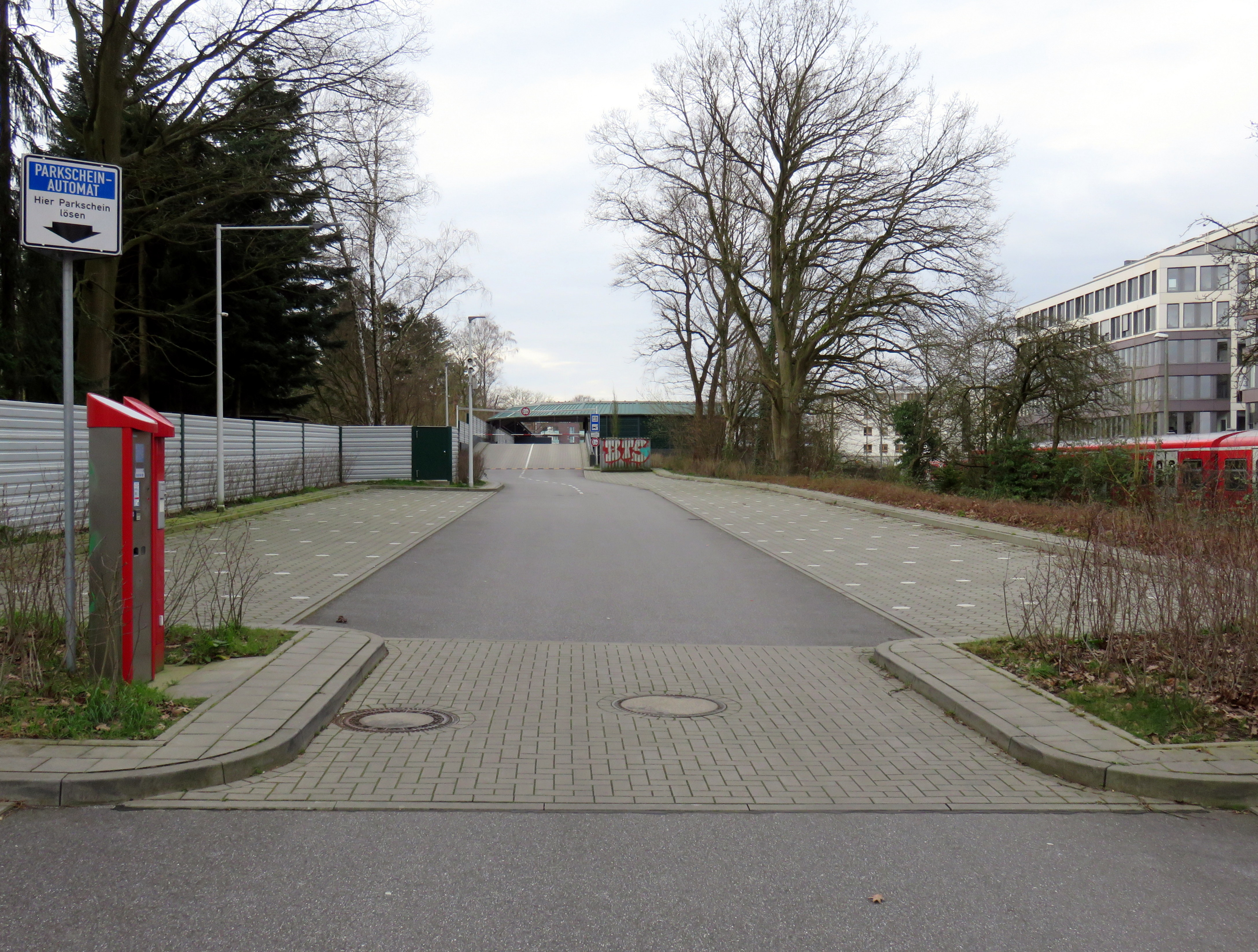
A station car park in Hamburg allows people to park and take the train into the centre.

Park and ride is a concept of parking whereby people drive or cycle to a car park away from their destination and use public transport or another form of transport, such as bicycle hire schemes, to complete their journey. This is done to reduce the amount of traffic congestion and the need for parking in city centres, and to connect more people to public transport networks who may not be otherwise.

=== Bicycle parking ===
Parking lots specifically for bicycles are prevalent in many countries. These may include bicycle parking racks and locks, as well as more modern technologies for security and convenience. For instance, one bicycle parking lot in Tokyo has an automated parking system.

Certain parking lots or garages may contain parking facilities for other vehicles, such as bicycle parking. Underneath Utrecht Central station, there is a three-storey underground bicycle park which can store 12,656 bicycles.

=== Types of parking ===
In addition to basic car parking, variations of serviced parking types exist. Common serviced parking types are:

- Carport (open-air single-level covered parking)
- Valet parking
- Meet and Greet Parking
- Park and Fly Parking
- Peer-to-peer shared parking

Parking spaces within car parks may be variously arranged.

== Economics ==
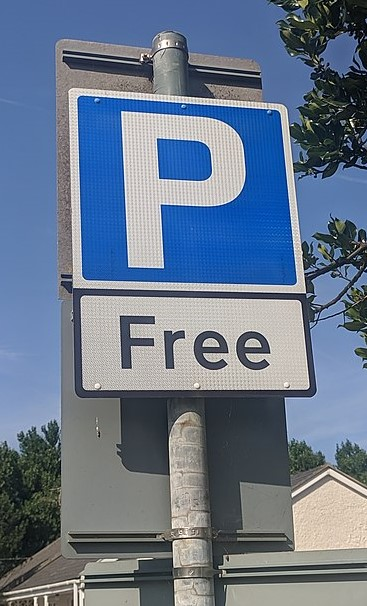
Free parking has hidden societal costs

Parking is one of the most important intermediate goods in the modern market economy. Early economic analysis treated parking only as an end-of-trip cost. However, later work has recognised that parking is a major use of land in any urban area. According to the International Parking Institute, "parking is a $25 billion industry and plays a pivotal role in transportation, building design, quality of life and environmental issues". Annual parking revenue in the US alone is $10 billion.

In urban areas, car parks compete with each other and curbside parking spaces. Drivers do not want to walk far from where they have parked, giving car parks local monopoly power.

=== Pricing, fees and subsidy ===
Urban parking spaces can have a high value where the price of land is high. The price to buy a parking space in Boston, USA, in August 2020 ranged just under US$39,000 in the West End to almost $250,000 in the South End.

Rather than buying a space, motorists often pay hourly or daily fees for short-term use of a space. According to Parkopedia's 2019 Global Parking Index, the cost for 2 hours of parking in US dollars for 25 cities is as follows:

Country	City	Price
United States	New York	$34.94
Australia	Sydney	$27.37
Australia	Brisbane	$20.55
United States	Chicago	$20.08
Australia	Melbourne	$19.87
United States	Boston	$18.36
United Kingdom	London	$16.92
United States	Washington DC	$15.56
United States	Philadelphia	$14.77
Japan	Tokyo	$12.09
United States	Denver	$11.87
Netherlands	Amsterdam	$11.11
United States	Miami	$11.10
United States	San Francisco	$10.99
United States	San Diego	$10.80
United States	Baltimore	$10.45
France	Paris	$10.10
United States	Newark	$10.10
New Zealand	Auckland	$9.77
Canada	Calgary	$9.69
Canada	Montreal	$9.66
United States	Los Angeles	$9.56
Canada	Toronto	$9.51
United States	Seattle	$9.34
Norway	Oslo	$9.25

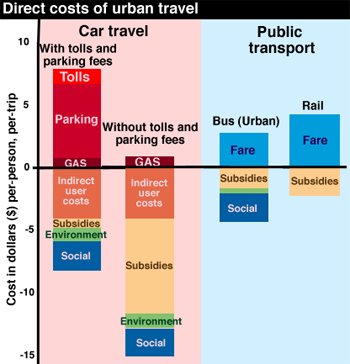
The cost of motor vehicle parking plays a major role in transportation choices (US, 1999 dollars). The value above the line represents the out-of-pocket cost per trip for each mode of transportation, while the value below the line accounts for subsidies, environmental impact, social and indirect costs.

The costs of parking include the construction, maintenance, and operation of parking spaces, as well as indirect environmental and social costs. The extent to which these costs are recouped by user fees, taxes, tolls, or else simply sustained through public subsidy is variable. As shown in the associated figure, when cities charge market rates for on-street parking and municipal parking garages for motor vehicles, and when bridges and tunnels are tolled for these modes, driving becomes less competitive in terms of out-of-pocket costs compared to other modes of transportation. When municipal motor vehicle parking is underpriced, and roads are not tolled, the shortfall in tax expenditures by drivers, through fuel tax and other taxes, might be regarded as a very large subsidy for automobile use: much greater than common subsidies for the maintenance of infrastructure and discounted fares for public transportation.

=== Parking price elasticity ===
The average response in parking demand to a change in price (parking price elasticity) is -0.52 for commuting and -0.62 for non-commuting trips. Non-commuters also respond to parking fees by changing their parking duration if the price is per hour.

=== Performance parking ===
Donald C. Shoup in 2005 argued in his book The High Cost of Free Parking against the large-scale use of land and other resources in urban and suburban areas for motor vehicle parking. Shoup's work has been popularized along with market-rate parking and performance parking, both of which raise and lower the price of metered street parking with the goal of reducing cruising for parking and double parking without overcharging for parking.

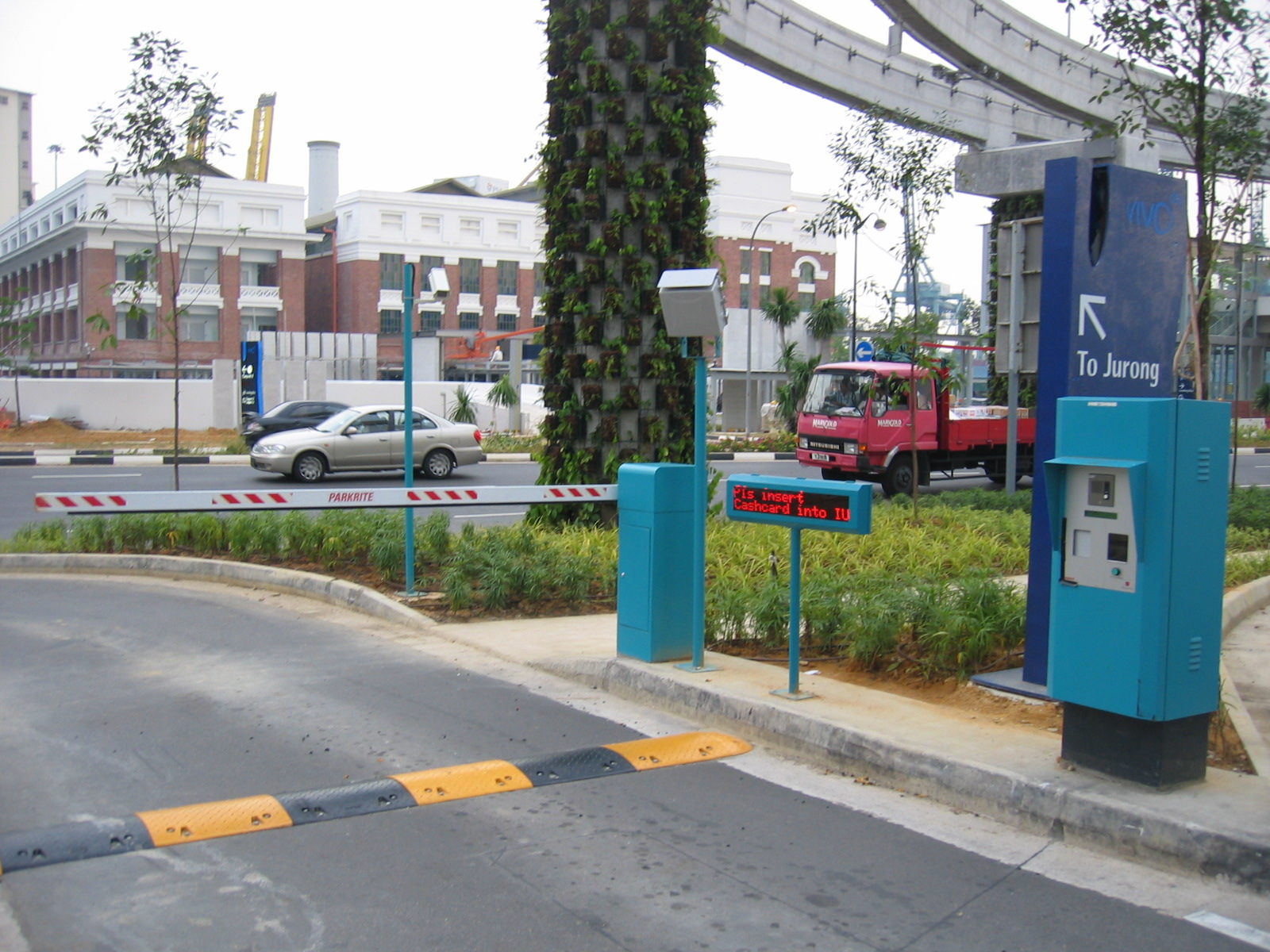
Electronic Parking System exit gate

"Performance parking" or variable-rate parking is based on Shoup's ideas. Electronic parking meters are used so that parking spaces in desirable locations and at desirable times are more expensive than less desirable locations. Other variations include rising rates based on the duration of parking. More modern ideas use sensors and networked parking meters that "bid up" (or down) the price of parking automatically with the goal of keeping 85–90% of the spaces in use at any given time to ensure perpetual parking availability. These ideas have been implemented in Redwood City, California and are being implemented in San Francisco and Los Angeles.

One empirical study supports performance-based pricing by analyzing the block-level price elasticity of parking demand in the SFpark context. The study suggests that block-level elasticities vary so widely that urban planners and economists cannot accurately predict the response in parking demand to a given change in price. The public policy implication is that planners should utilize observed occupancy rates in order to adjust prices so that target occupancy rates are achieved. Effective implementation will require further experimentation with and assessment of the tâtonnement process.

== Geography ==
The management of parking as a land use is an aspect of urban planning.

Municipal parking regulations introduced controls for parking on public land, often funded through parking meters. However, with the growth of car use, the supply of on-street parking became insufficient to meet demand. City centre merchants called on municipalities to subsidise car parking in the city centre to facilitate competition against new forms of car-centric commercial development.

Parking is a heavy land use. The total land area of parking in the US is at least the size of Massachusetts.

Off-street parking can be a temporary usage for a land owner to extract value from a vacant lot.

== Parking restrictions ==
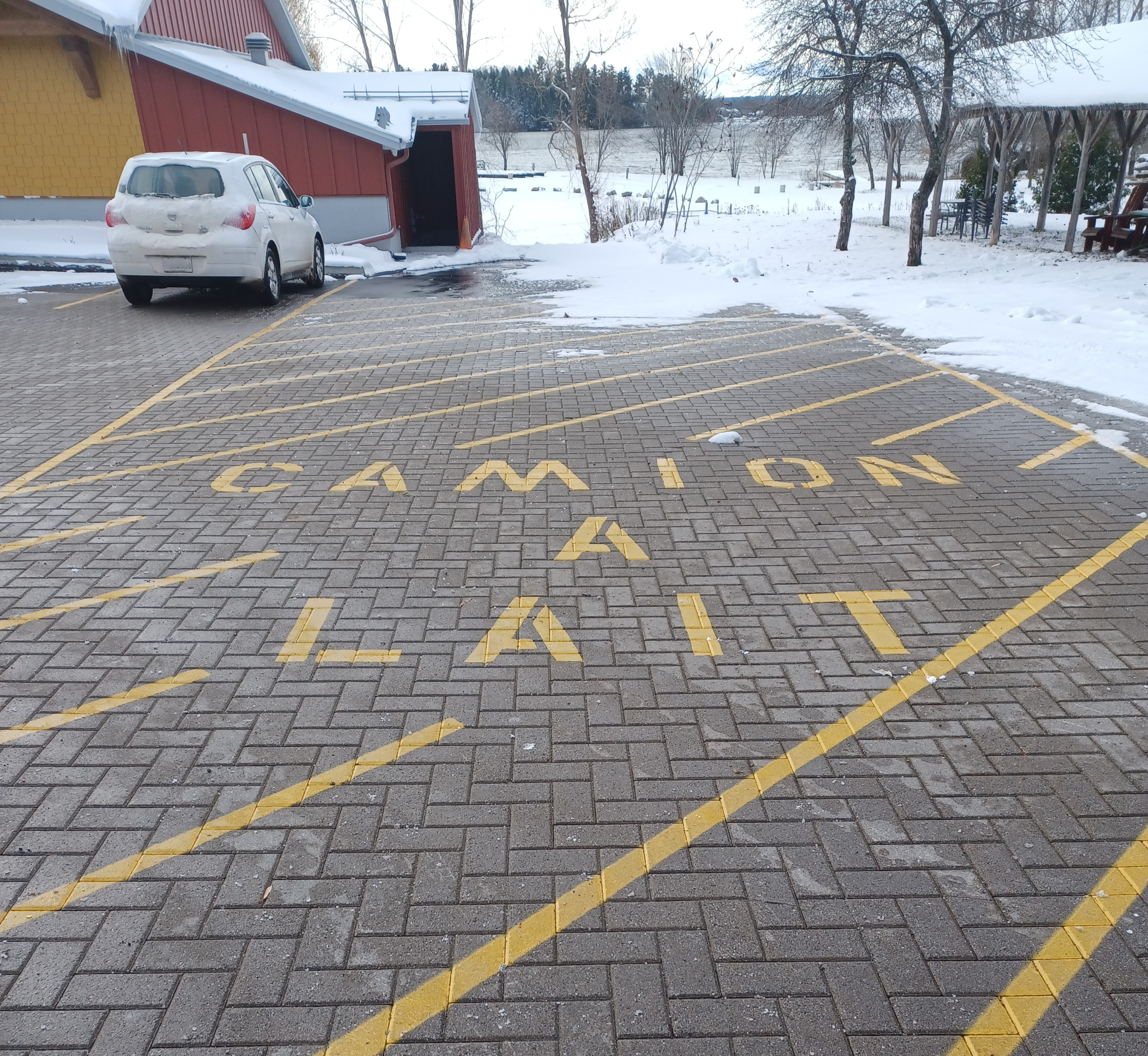
A parking space reserved for milk trucks at a Montebello cheese production facility. The French wording says "Camion à lait", which means "Milk truck").

During the winter of 2005 in Boston, the practice of some people saving convenient roadway for themselves became controversial. At that time, many Boston districts had an informal convention that if a person shoveled the snow out of a road space, that person could claim ownership of that space with a marker. However, the city government defied that custom and cleared markers out of spaces.

=== Parking minimums and maximums ===
In congested urban areas, parking of motor vehicles is time-consuming and often expensive. Urban planners who are in a position to override market forces must consider whether and how to accommodate or "demand manage" potentially large numbers of motor vehicles in small geographic areas. Usually, the authorities set minimum, or more rarely maximum, numbers of motor vehicle parking spaces for new housing and commercial developments, and may also plan their location and distribution to influence their convenience and accessibility. The costs or subsidies of such parking accommodations can become a heated point in local politics. For example, in 2006, the San Francisco Board of Supervisors considered a controversial zoning plan to limit the number of motor vehicle parking spaces available in new residential developments.

Tradeable parking allowances have been proposed for dense residential areas to reduce inequity and increase urban livability. In summary, each resident would receive an annual, fractional allowance for on-street parking. To park on the street, one must assemble a whole parking allowance by purchasing fractional allowances from others who do not own cars.

== Parking by country ==
=== Germany ===
German municipalities have variegated transport cultures and policies; however, common federal laws govern the use of street space and the rights of motorists. German law privileges parked cars as traffic and constrains the ability of municipal governments to implement diverse parking policies.

German legal principles determine that the use of public streets is for traffic, including car parking. Consequently, German motorists tend to assert a right to park for free on the public highway.

Fees for yearly residential parking permits vary widely between cities: the city government of Bonn charges €360, while Munich and Chemnitz each charge €30, and Berlin only €10.

=== Japan ===
In Japan, since 1962, to buy a car, one is required to obtain a "garage certificate" (shako shomeisho) from their local prefecture's police, providing proof of their own off-street parking space that they either buy or rent, which is not located more than 2 kilometers from their place of residence. Kei cars can be exempted from the parking space requirement in some sparsely populated areas. Overnight street parking is not allowed.

=== United States ===
In some jurisdictions, those in possession of the proper ID tags or license plates are also free from parking violation tickets for running over their metered time or parking in an inappropriate place, as some disabilities may prohibit the use of regular spaces. Illegally parking in a disabled parking space or fraudulent use of another person's permit is heavily fined.

=== South Korea ===
==== Shortage of parking lots ====
In South Korea, there are many more vehicles than there are parking lots in the country, so parking lots are sometimes created as a way to utilize empty spaces where people are playing.

==== Discount system ====
There are not many compact cars in Korea, so the government is providing a lot of support for them, and the parking lot discount system for them is an example of that.

- Full discounts on eco-friendly cars are also active.
- Electric & Hydrogen & Hybrid vehicles: 50% Off
- Compact cars: 50% to 60% off

As the number of users of the large supermarket chain increased in Korea, the utilization rate of the traditional market sharply decreased. Accordingly, each local government has a large-scale parking lot near the traditional market and provides discounts to users.

- Traditional market users: 1 hour exemption & 50% off additional 1 hour afterwards

The low birth rate problem in Korea is serious, and there is a lot of support for it.

- Multi-child households: 50% off
- Disabled person: 1 hour exemption / 50% off additional 1 hour afterwards
- Persons of national merit and persons eligible for veterans benefits: 1 hour exemption / 50% discount for an additional 1 hour afterwards

== Parking at various destinations ==
=== Hospitals ===
In England, NHS hospitals are permitted to charge patients, staff, and visitors for parking at the hospital. This has been criticised for adding extra costs to accessing healthcare. In Scotland and Wales, all hospital parking charges have been abolished.

=== Airports ===
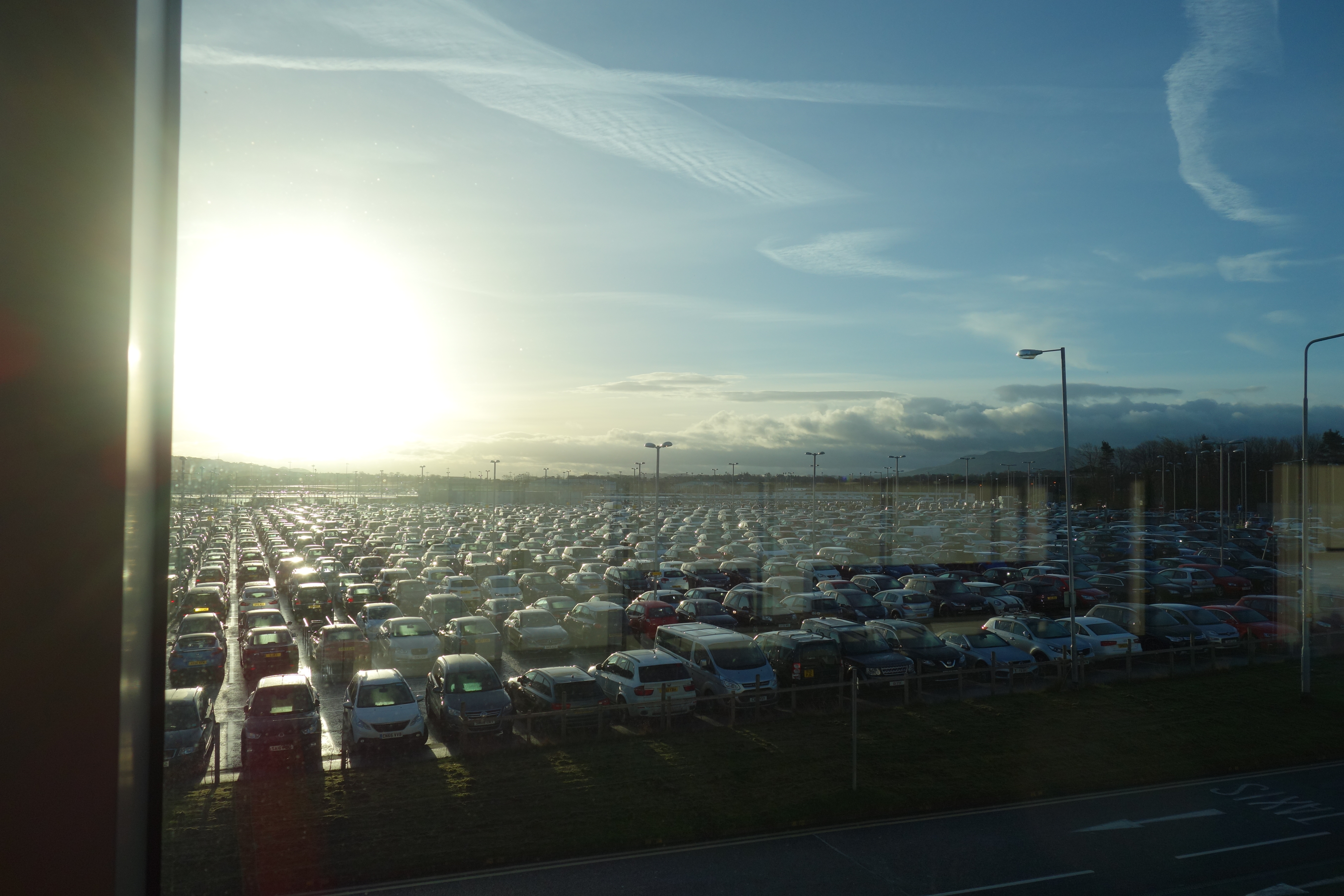
Long-stay parking at Edinburgh Airport

Most airports provide parking for patrons. Parking is normally split into short-stay parking, intended for those dropping off or picking up passengers, and long-stay parking, intended for staff and passengers who choose to drive to the airport. At larger airports, long-stay parking may be located further away from the terminal, while parking at the terminal will be more expensive. Some airports charge more for parking cars than for parking aircraft. Airports may be reluctant to discourage passengers from arriving at the airport by car due to the revenues generated.

At UK airports, it is rare for employees to pay for their car parking. Generally, the airport authority will charge for staff permits, but these permits will be purchased by employers and the cost not passed on to staff. Staff are generally more willing to park at a site away from the airport than passengers too.

== Statistics ==
Parking Generation is a document produced by the Institute of Transportation Engineers (ITE) that assembles a vast array of parking demand observations predominantly from the United States. It summarizes the amount of parking observed with various land uses at different times of the day/week/month/year, including the peak parking demand. While it has been assailed by some planners for lack of data in urban settings, it stands as the single largest accumulation of actual parking demand data related to land use. Anyone can submit parking demand data for inclusion. The report is updated approximately every 5 to 10 years.

== Finding parking ==
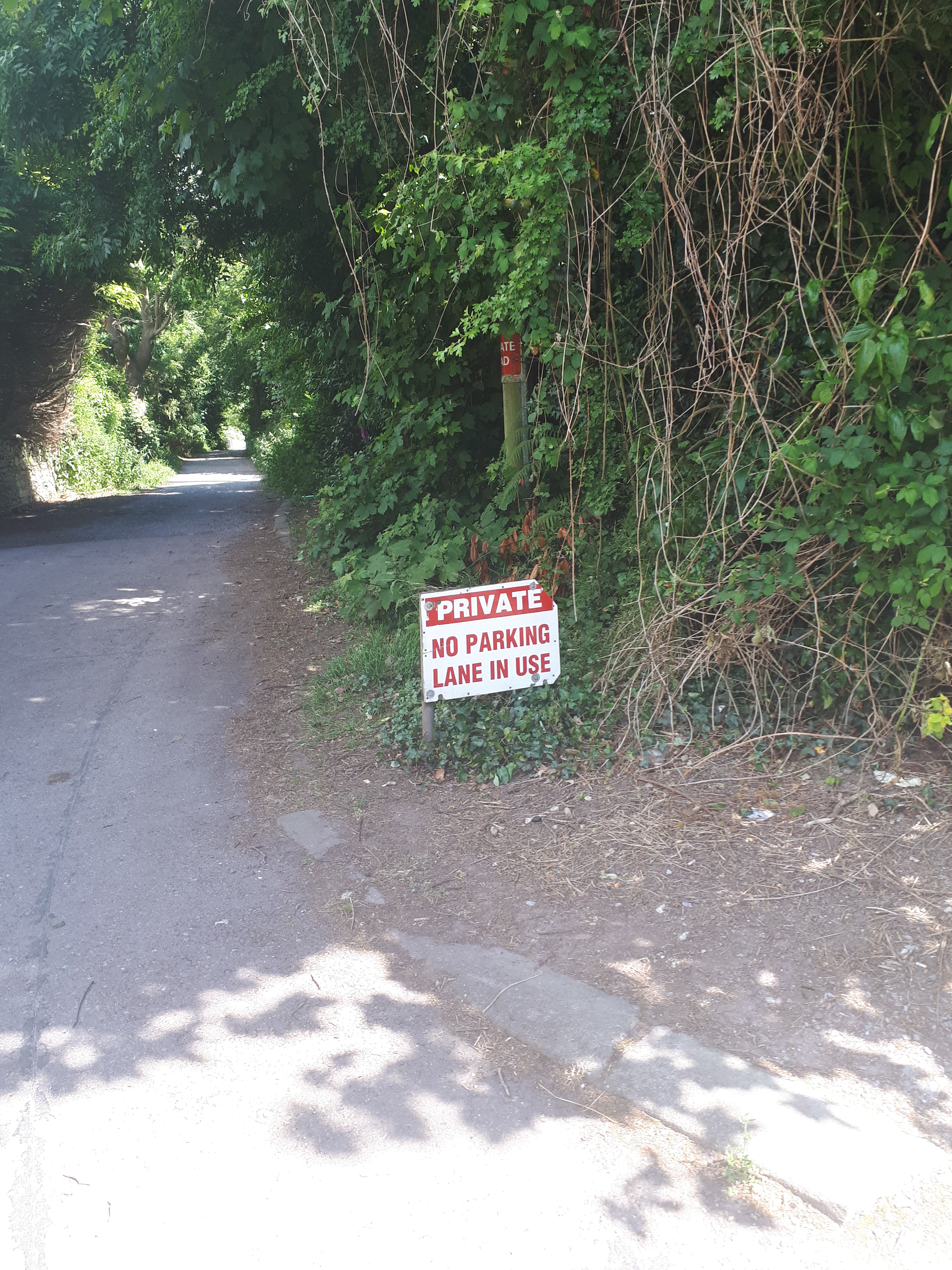
A sign indicating that no parking is allowed on a lane

When the supply of kerbside parking in a particular area is less than the demand for parking, a phenomenon known as cruising occurs, where drivers drive on streets in search of a parking space. It can also occur where there is a supply of kerbside space, but parking restriction or payment costs discourage drivers from parking there.

Cruising is an economic decision, with the cost of parking dominant in determining cruising behaviour. This is grounded in the principle that drivers will only cruise if the cost of cruising is lower than the savings of not parking in available chargeable spaces. Drivers are more likely to cruise if on-street parking is cheaper than off-street parking, the costs of fuel are cheap, the driver wishes to park for longer, the driver is alone in the car and the driver's time is not valuable to them. Cruising can be diminished if the cost of on-street parking is set equal to the cost of off-street parking.

Automated Parking Guidance systems present drivers with dynamic information on parking within controlled areas (like parking garages and parking lots). The systems combine traffic monitoring, communication, processing and variable message sign technologies to provide the service.

Mobile apps and parking booking platforms that help drivers find parking take different approaches have emerged.

Some connected cars have mobile apps associated with the in-car system that can locate the car or indicate the last place it was parked. Cars with Internavi communicate to each other, indicating recently vacated spots.

San Francisco uses a system called SFpark, which has sensors embedded in the roadway. It allows drivers to find parking via mobile app, website, or SMS, and includes "smart" parking meters and garages that use variable pricing based on time and location to keep approximately 15% of parking spaces open. Some South Boston spots also have sensors, so users of an app called Parker can find vacancies.

Ford Motor Company is developing a system called Parking Spotter, which allows vehicles to upload parking spot information into the cloud for other drivers to access.

Parking guidance and information system provides information about the availability of parking spaces within a controlled area. The systems may include vehicle detection sensors that can count the number of available spaces and display the information on various signs. There may be indicator lights that can lead drivers to an exact available spot.

An amusing alliterative slang term for finding an ideal parking spot directly in front of one's destination is Doris Day parking named for the American singer and actor who, in numerous romantic comedy films was shown to immediately drive into the perfect spot time after time.

Statistically, the optimal strategy is to drive past the first empty spot and park in the next available spot.

== See also ==
- Alternate side parking
- Automatic parking
- Back-in angle parking
- Car condo
- Decriminalised parking enforcement
- Disabled parking permit
- Disc parking
- Franelero
- Karpatiosorbus admonitor, the no parking whitebeam – so named because the type specimen was discovered with a no parking sign nailed to it
- Lovers' lane
- Men's parking space
- Omniview technology
- Overspill parking
- Parking space reservation in snowstorms
- Predatory towing
- Shared parking
- Snow removal
- Women's parking space
- Zone Bleue
