= San Francisco Municipal Transportation Agency =

Government transportation agency in San Francisco

San Francisco Municipal Transportation Agency (SFMTA)

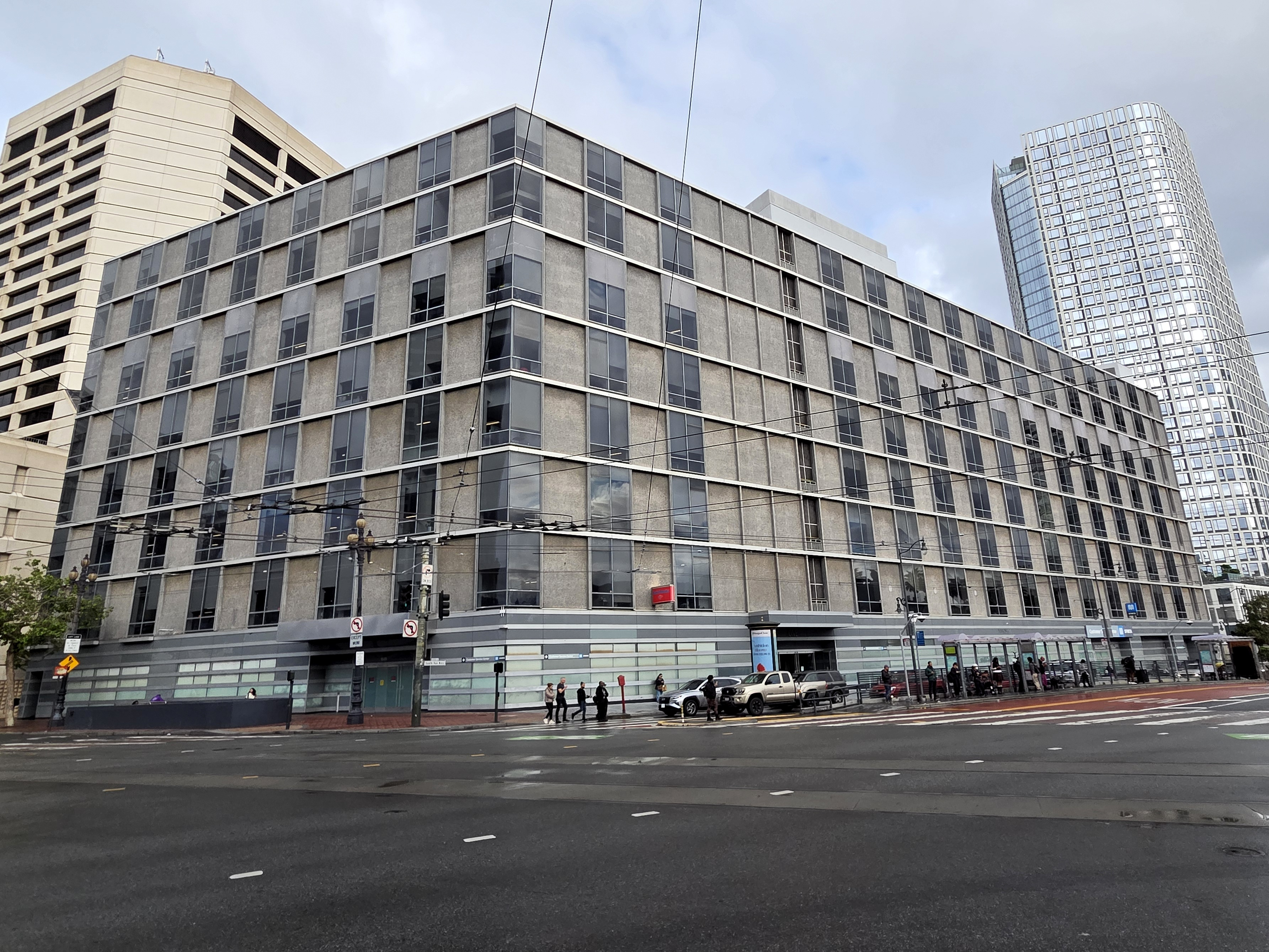
- SFMTA offices at 1 South Van Ness Avenue

Agency overview
- Formed: 1999
- Preceding agencies: San Francisco Public Transportation Commission; San Francisco Department of Parking and Traffic
- Jurisdiction: City and County of San Francisco
- Headquarters: 1 South Van Ness Avenue, San Francisco, California
- Employees: 4,800
- Annual budget: $1.446 billion (2024)
- Agency executives: Julie Kirschbaum, Director of Transportation; Amanda Eaken, Chair, SFMTA Board of Directors
- Child agency: San Francisco Municipal Railway
- Website: sfmta.com

The San Francisco Municipal Transportation Agency (SFMTA) is an agency that oversees public transport, taxis, bicycle infrastructure, pedestrian infrastructure, and paratransit for the City and County of San Francisco. It was created in 1999 by consolidation of the San Francisco Municipal Railway (Muni), the Department of Parking and Traffic (DPT), and the Taxicab Commission.

== Overview ==
The SFMTA oversees the management of streets and ground transportation in the City and County of San Francisco, delegating its authority to several divisions within the agency. These divisions are tasked with managing specific aspects of the city's transportation such as transit, street design, parking needs, taxis, and so on.

=== San Francisco Municipal Railway ===
The SFMTA handles rail, bus, and other public transportation under its Transit division (the San Francisco Municipal Railway, commonly known as "Muni"). The SFMTA handles over 700,000 weekday boardings (707,590 in fiscal year 2017) on its public transit services and serves 90 routes. Muni provides transit services with its vehicle fleet of, as of 2015, 1096 service vehicles: buses (both diesel and trolleybus), cable cars, light rail vehicles, and historic streetcars. The agency and its board also set the fares for the system, with the last increase setting the general adult fare to $2.85 in July 2025. As a unified agency managing both the streets and transit system, the SFMTA can use its authority over the city's streets to add bus lanes (the agency maintains 15.6 miles (25.1 km) of bus lanes) and transit signal priority in order to improve service performance for the transit system.

Though the SFMTA primarily serves the transit needs of the city of San Francisco, it also participates in regional transit planning efforts. For example, a representative of the SFMTA sits on the board of the Peninsula Corridor Joint Powers Board which oversees Caltrain, a regional commuter rail system in the Bay Area.

=== Streets, Parking, and Taxis ===
Through its Streets Division, the SFMTA is responsible for the planning and design of the streets of San Francisco in addition to parking and curb management as well as parking and traffic enforcement. This includes responsibility over automobile parking, bicycle infrastructure, bus and transit lanes, sidewalks and so on. The agency maintains over 434 bicycle lanes and 4000 bicycle parking racks, and has jurisdiction over 1088 miles of roads. Parking for automobiles is also managed by the agency, with 277,000 on-street parking spaces and with several parking garages around the city maintained by the agency. The SFMTA operates the SFpark program to dynamically price metered parking spaces on the city's streets in order to regulate parking demand and ensure that parking spaces remain available for use. Some parking spaces managed by the city are dedicated to car-sharing programs such as Zipcar in order to reduce the necessity of car ownership.

The SFMTA's Taxi and Accessible Service division oversees the regulation of taxis and paratransit services in the city. Nearly 2000 taxi medallions have been issued by the agency. Private transit services, such as Chariot, are also regulated by the agency and are required to operate routes that complement the city's transit services rather than compete with them. In addition to regulating private transit operators, the SFMTA has expressed interest in regulating vehicle for hire companies including Uber and Lyft, but the regulatory authority for in California lies with the California Public Utilities Commission.

== Funding ==
Operating and capital funding for the SFMTA comes from a variety of sources. On the operating side, funding comes from San Francisco's general fund, transit passenger fares, fines and fees the agency charges, grants, and revenue from parking facilities. On the capital side, funding comes from at least 38 different sources at the local (San Francisco), regional (Bay Area), state, and federal levels. Funding from the general fund is affected by the 2014 Proposition B ballot measure, which tied the allocation from the general fund to the population growth in the city.

The total operating revenue for 2017 was $1.063 billion, with around $206 million budgeted from transit fares, $293 million from the city's general fund, and $329 million from parking, fines, and fees. The capital budget was $829 million in 2017, with the vast majority of the funds going to the Central Subway project, transit expansion, and vehicle procurement and facility improvements. Specific sources of local and regional funding include the 2003 Proposition K sales tax, 2018's Regional Measure 3, and the 2010 Measure AA vehicle registration fee.

== Current capital projects ==
The SFMTA is managing several large capital projects for improving transportation in San Francisco. These include:

- The Central Subway, which extended the T Third Street line of the Muni Metro to the Chinatown neighborhood via a 1.7 mile subway tunnel, three new underground stations, and one new above-ground station.
- Van Ness Bus Rapid Transit, the first bus rapid transit project to start construction in San Francisco. The project adds two miles of bus priority lanes on Van Ness Avenue.
- Geary Bus Rapid Transit, a project to improve reliability on the heavily used 38-Geary bus line with bus priority lanes.
- Better Market Street, a project to rebuild Market Street for improved bicycle, pedestrian, and transit access.

== History ==
The SFMTA was established by the passage of Proposition E in November 1999, a measure which amended San Francisco's charter and established the semi-independent agency to combine and run Muni and DPT. The measure, promoted by the transit riders' group Rescue Muni, among others, established service standards for the agency and made a number of changes to the laws governing it.

Prior to the passage of Proposition E, the Muni was governed by the Public Transportation Commission and the Department of Parking and Traffic was governed by the Parking and Traffic Commission. Both bodies were dissolved upon the full implementation of Proposition E.

Proposition E established a seven-member board to govern the agency, its members appointed for fixed, staggered terms by the Mayor of San Francisco and subject to confirmation by the city and county's Board of Supervisors. Board members are limited to three terms. The SFMTA Board of Directors is responsible for, among other things, hiring the agency's executive director.

At its inception, the SFMTA's Director of Transportation (a position referred to, at various times, in practice and by SFMTA Board policy, as "Executive Director" or "Executive Director/CEO") was Michael T. Burns. On July 15, 2005, he left the SFMTA for a position with Santa Clara VTA. Deputy Executive Director Stuart Sunshine, a former aide to Mayor Frank Jordan and Mayor Willie Brown, and a former head of the Department of Parking and Traffic, served as acting executive director until January 17, 2006, when Nathaniel P. Ford Sr., previously the general manager and CEO of MARTA in Atlanta, took over as the new executive director. On June 15, 2011, the SFMTA announced Ford would be leaving the agency effective June 30, 2011; shortly thereafter the SFMTA Board decided that Director of Administration, Taxis, and Accessible Services Debra A. Johnson would take over as acting executive director until a permanent replacement was selected by the SFMTA Board. The board selected Edward D. Reiskin, the head of the San Francisco Department of Public Works, as the permanent executive director, effective August 15, 2011.

The first chair of the SFMTA Board of Directors was H. Welton Flynn; he was succeeded by Cleopatra Vaughns. When Vaughns left the board, James McCray Jr. was elected chairman. Like two of his then-colleagues, McCray previously served on the Parking and Traffic Commission, which was abolished when the department merged into the SFMTA. A majority of the current SFMTA Board was first appointed by Mayor Ed Lee; Tom Nolan, Cheryl Brinkman, and Malcolm Heinecke were initially appointed by Mayor Gavin Newsom and later reappointed by Lee.

Only once has the Board of Supervisors exercised its prerogative, under the charter, to reject the mayor's appointees to the SFMTA Board, when then-Mayor Newsom appointed Hunter Stern to a vacant seat. The Board of Supervisors rejected Stern by a 7–4 vote on September 27, 2005. Stern was an official with the International Brotherhood of Electrical Workers.

Proposition E also established a 15-member SFMTA Citizens Advisory Council which must review the agency's budget and which makes recommendations on agency policy. The mayor appoints four members of the SFMTA Citizens Advisory Council and each member of the Board of Supervisors appoints one.

Proposition E allowed for the SFMTA to take over the functions of the Taxicab Commission. In 2009, the agency did so, as a result of legislation passed by the Board of Supervisors and signed by the mayor.

In November 2005, the voters of San Francisco rejected, by a margin of 35%–65%, a ballot measure which would have allowed the Board of Supervisors to appoint three of the SFMTA Board's seven members. In November 2007, the voters of San Francisco approved, by a vote of 55% to 45%, a charter amendment further expanding the power of the SFMTA Board, granting the agency more flexibility in its labor relations, providing more funding for the agency, and imposing new limits on downtown parking. In November 2016 San Francisco voters rejected by 45%–55% a second ballot measure that would have split appointments between the mayor and the Board of Supervisors. The measure would also have made it easier for the supervisors to reject the SFMTA budget.

In November 2016, SFMTA was hit by hackers, using ransomware, demanding $70,000 in bitcoins, with fare machines reading “OUT OF SERVICE”, resulting in passengers riding for free.

Due to the COVID-19 pandemic in San Francisco, SFMTA cut their bus service from 68 lines in February 2020 to as low as 17 in April 2020. In July 2020, SFMTA expected to lose over $568 million in revenue over the next four years. Along with increased pension costs and an expected annual $472 million maintenance cost, the transportation chief Jeffrey Tumlin has stated that up to 40 lines would not be reimplemented if the city of San Francisco fails to find new revenue sources.

== SFMTA Board of Directors ==
- Janet Tarlov, Chair
- Stephanie Cajina, Vice Chair
- Mike Chen, Director
- Alfonso Felder, Director
- Steve Heminger, Director
- Dominica Henderson, Director
- Fiona Hinze, Director
- Christine Silva, Board Secretary

== List of Directors of Transportation of the SFMTA ==
Name	Service began	Service ended
Michael T. Burns	March 7, 2000	July 15, 2005
Stuart Sunshine (acting)	July 15, 2005	January 17, 2006
Nathaniel P. Ford Sr.	January 17, 2006	June 30, 2011
Debra A. Johnson (acting)	July 1, 2011	August 14, 2011
Edward D. Reiskin	August 15, 2011	August 14, 2019
Thomas Maguire (acting)	August 15, 2019	December 15, 2019
Jeffrey Tumlin	December 16, 2019	December 31, 2024
Julie Kirschbaum (acting)	January 1, 2025	February 17, 2025
Julie Kirschbaum	February 18, 2025	

The city charter refers to this office as the Director of Transportation, though the alternative title "Executive Director" was more commonly used during the first decade of the agency's existence. In February 2006, the MTA Board adopted a resolution adding "CEO" to the title. When Edward D. Reiskin took office in 2011, he opted to use only the position's official title. As of May 2026, this position is referred to as the Director of Transportation.

== List of chairs of the SFMTA Board of Directors ==
Name	Service Began	Service Ended
H. Welton Flynn	March 7, 2000	January 20, 2004
Cleopatra Vaughns	January 20, 2004	May 2, 2006
Michael Kasolas (acting)	May 2, 2006	May 16, 2006
James McCray Jr.	May 16, 2006	February 3, 2009
Tom Nolan	February 3, 2009	January 17, 2017
Cheryl Brinkman	January 17, 2017	January 15, 2019
Malcolm Heinicke	January 15, 2019	May 19, 2020
Gwyneth Borden	May 19, 2020	April 24, 2023
Amanda Eaken	January 17, 2023	November 9, 2024
Janet Tarlov	January 16, 2025	
