= The High Cost of Free Parking =

Book by Donald Shoup

- Author: Donald Shoup
- Language: English
- Subject: Free parking
- Genre: Non-fiction
- Publisher: American Planning Association, Routledge
- Publication date: March 1, 2005; 2011 (Revised Edition)
- Publication place: United States
- Media type: Print (Hardcover)
- Pages: 733
- ISBN: 1884829988
- Website: Author's Website

The High Cost of Free Parking is an urban planning book by UCLA professor Donald Shoup dealing with the costs of free parking on society. It is structured as a criticism of the planning and regulation of parking and recommends that parking be built and allocated according to its fair market value. It incorporates elements of Shoup's Georgist philosophy.

The book was originally published in 2005 by the American Planning Association and the Planners Press. A revised edition was released in 2011 by Routledge.

== Contents ==
The High Cost of Free Parking begins with a discussion of the history of automobiles and parking and how vehicle ownership rates have steadily increased over time. Shoup argues that parking is a classic tragedy of the commons problem, wherein drivers compete over scarce public parking spaces and consume time and resources searching for them.

Shoup then criticizes the Institute of Transportation Engineers for how it determines parking generation rates and the amount of parking needed for certain land uses, for extrapolating based on limited data, and for not accounting for factors like public transportation, which he argues leads to inaccurate rates. He concludes that the methods used to determine these rates amount to "pseudoscience" because they appear scientific but are, in his view, often arbitrary.

Shoup goes on to discuss the cost of constructing and maintaining parking and the differences between public and private parking from a planning perspective. He delves into a number of case studies from cities around the world and considers the costs that come with people spending time searching for parking, which he terms "cruising".

Shoup ends the book with a number of recommendations. He outlines methods by which governments can collect revenue from parking and how it can design parking meters and systems to respond to price signals. He concludes by recommending three main reforms which can be made to improve parking policy: charging fair market prices for curb parking, returning parking revenue to neighborhoods for community investment, and removing the requirements for off-street parking for new development.

== Reception ==
The High Cost of Free Parking received generally positive reception. Reviewers generally found the book very comprehensive and practical for planners but also overly long and lacking in political solutions to parking's planning problems. A review by Dr. David S. Levinson, a professor at the University of Minnesota Twin Cities, stated that, "One cannot disagree with many of the proffered solutions as having roles in specific crowded and high-density places, the kind of places most planners prefer. Yet the vast majority of the United States now possesses sufficient free off-street parking to make these solutions irrelevant for decades to come."

Edward Steinfeld, in a review for the Journal of Urban Design, wrote, "This is an extraordinary book. An appropriate descriptive subtitle would be 'Everything you really wanted to know about parking but were afraid to ask!' It is a very long book about a small component of the built environment."

Susan Handy, in a review for the Journal of Planning Education and Research, found the book daunting at first, saying "this book, at more than 600 pages, is downright intimidating". However, she says that the book showed her that "parking is interesting, and it is hugely important." She concludes, "although Shoup often seems overly optimistic about the political feasibility of the changes he proposes, I'm convinced they're worth a try."
