= Parking space =

Designated location for parking a vehicle

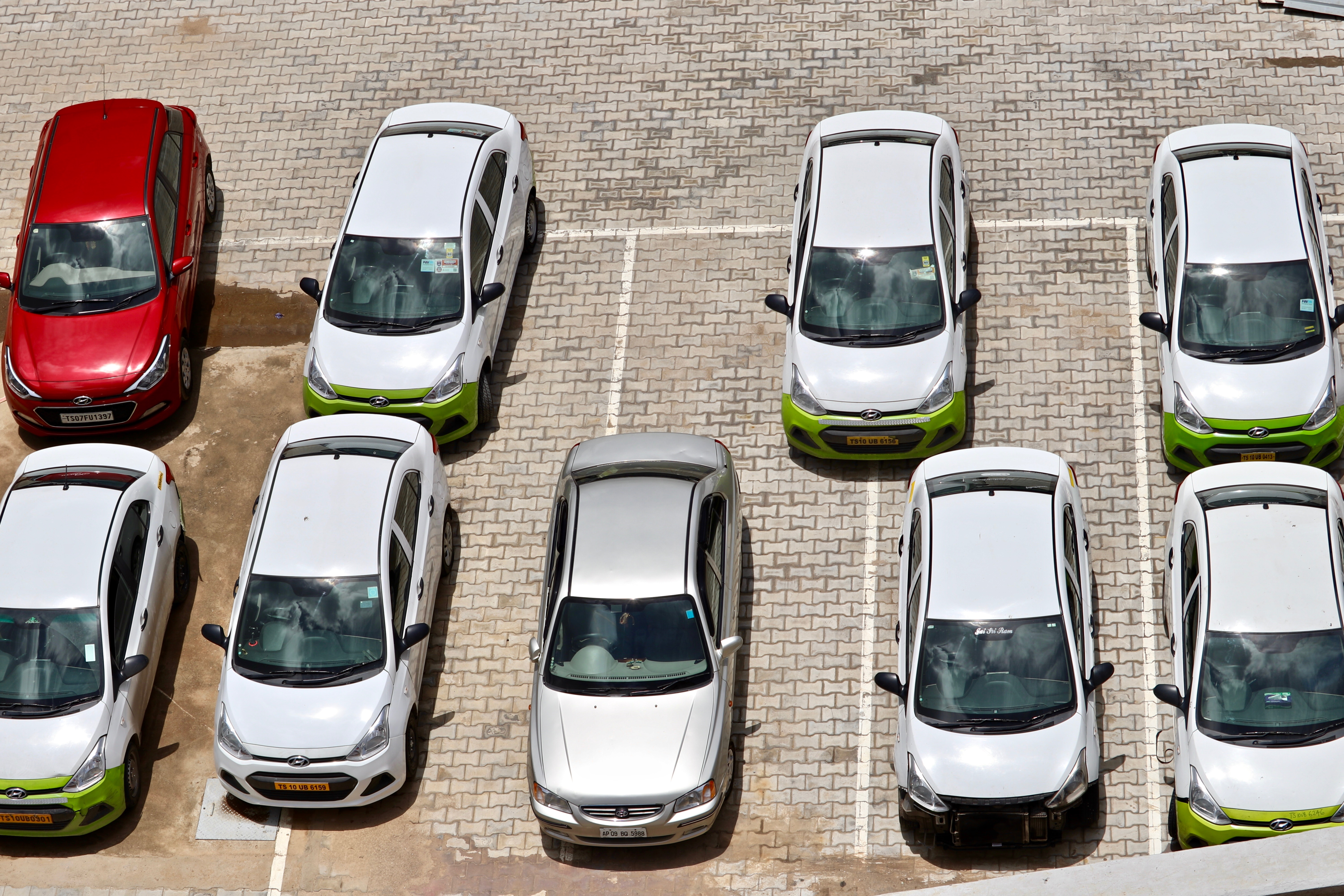
painted parking spaces/lots

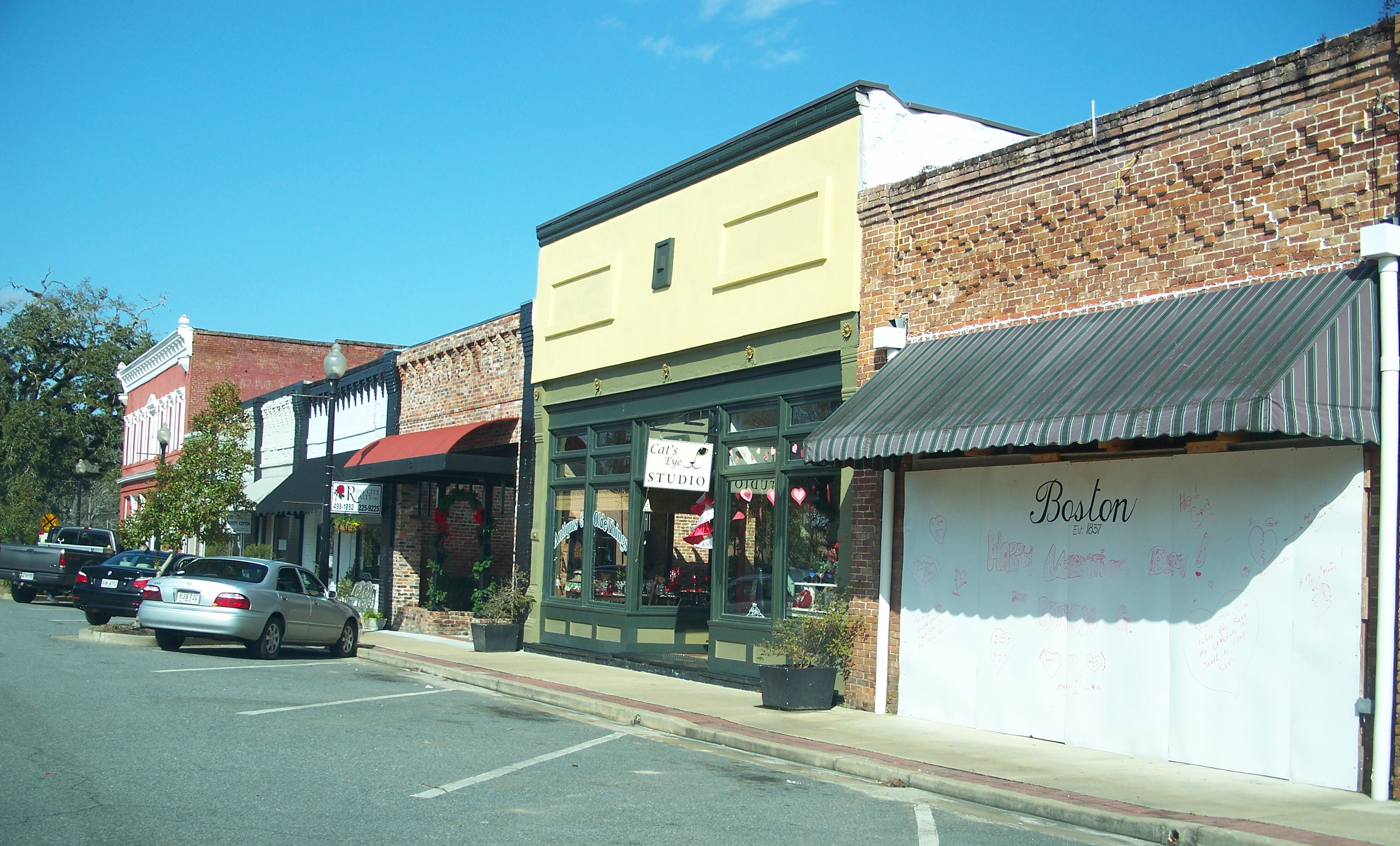
Angled parking spaces/lots

A parking space, parking place or parking spot is a location that is designated for parking, either paved or unpaved. It can be in a parking garage, in a parking lot or on a city street. The space may be delineated by road surface markings. The automobile fits inside the space, either by parallel parking, perpendicular parking or angled parking.

If in tandem parking, whoever pulled in the tandem parking stall first is now technically in the back. The second car, is now in the front since they have to leave first.

Depending on the location of the parking space, the time allowed to park may be fixed by regulation, and a fee may be required to use the parking space. It may be designated for free parking. When the demand for spaces outstrips supply, vehicles may overspill park onto the sidewalk, grass verges and other places which were not designed for the purpose.

== Patterns ==
For most motorised vehicles, there are three commonly used arrangements of parking spaces—parallel parking, perpendicular parking, and angle parking. These are self-park configurations where the vehicle driver is able to access the parking independently.

=== Parallel parking ===
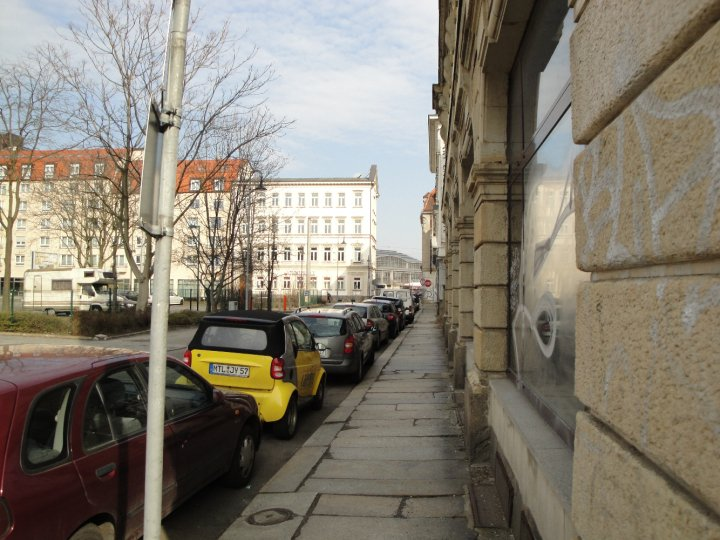
Vehicles parked on the side of a street in Leipzig, Germany

With parallel parking of cars, these are arranged in a line, with the front bumper of one car facing the back bumper of an adjacent one. This is done parallel to a curb, when one is provided. Parallel parking is the most common mode of streetside parking for cars. It may also be used in parking lots and parking structures, but usually only to supplement parking spaces that use the other modes.

=== Perpendicular parking ===
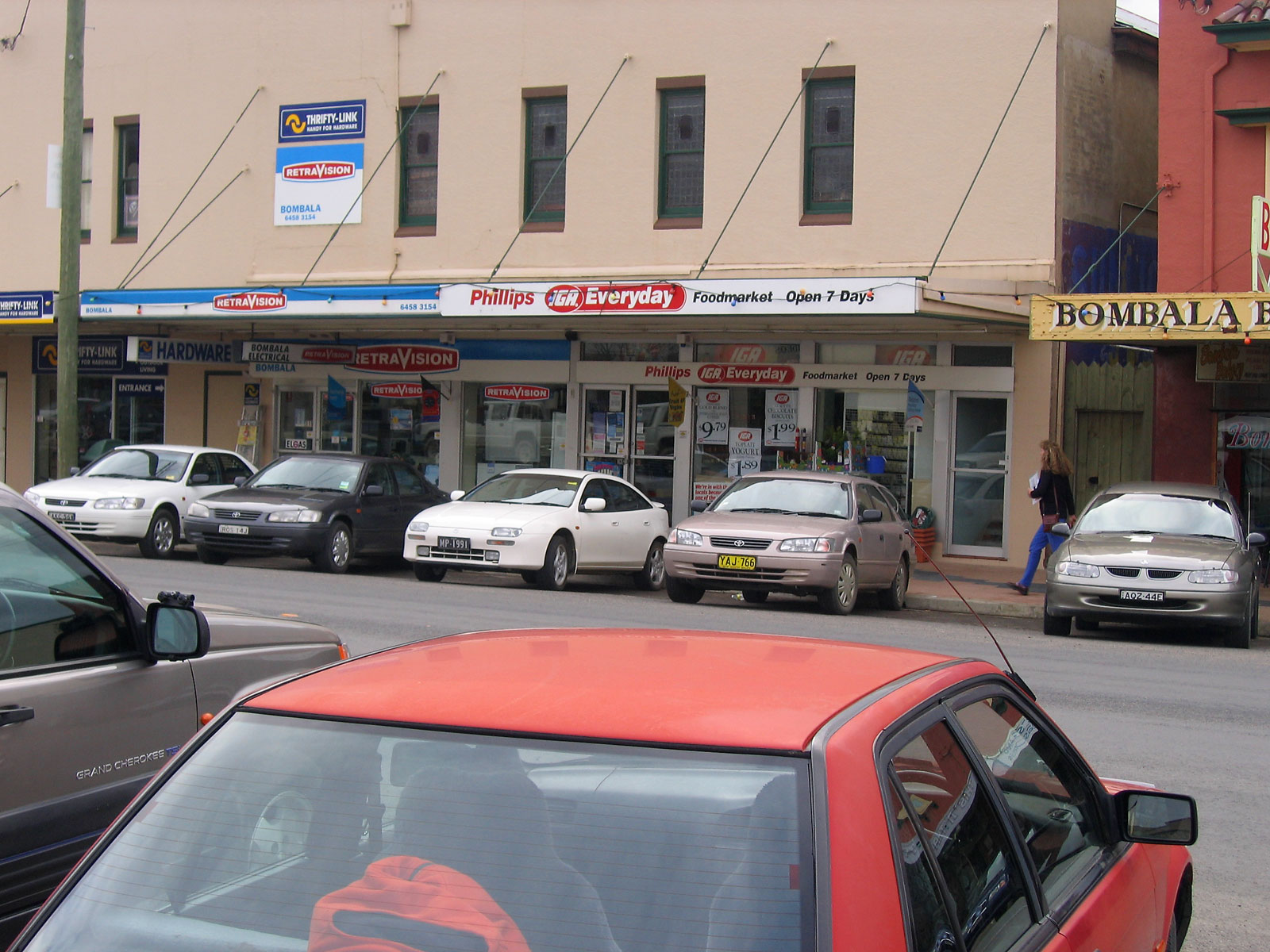
Bombala's (perpendicular) back-in parking style.

With perpendicular parking, also known as bay parking, cars are parked side to side, perpendicular to an aisle, curb, or wall. This type of car parking fits more cars per length of road (or curb) than parallel parking when a wider space is available, and is therefore commonly used in car parking lots and car parking structures.

Often, in car parking lots using perpendicular parking, two rows of parking spaces may be arranged front to front, with aisles in between. If no other cars are blocking, a driver may perform a "pullthrough" by driving through one parking space into the connecting space to avoid having to reverse out of a parking space upon their return.

Sometimes, a single row of perpendicular car parking spaces is marked in the center of a street. This arrangement eliminates reversing from the maneuver; cars are required to drive in forwards and drive out forwards.

=== Angle parking/echelon parking ===
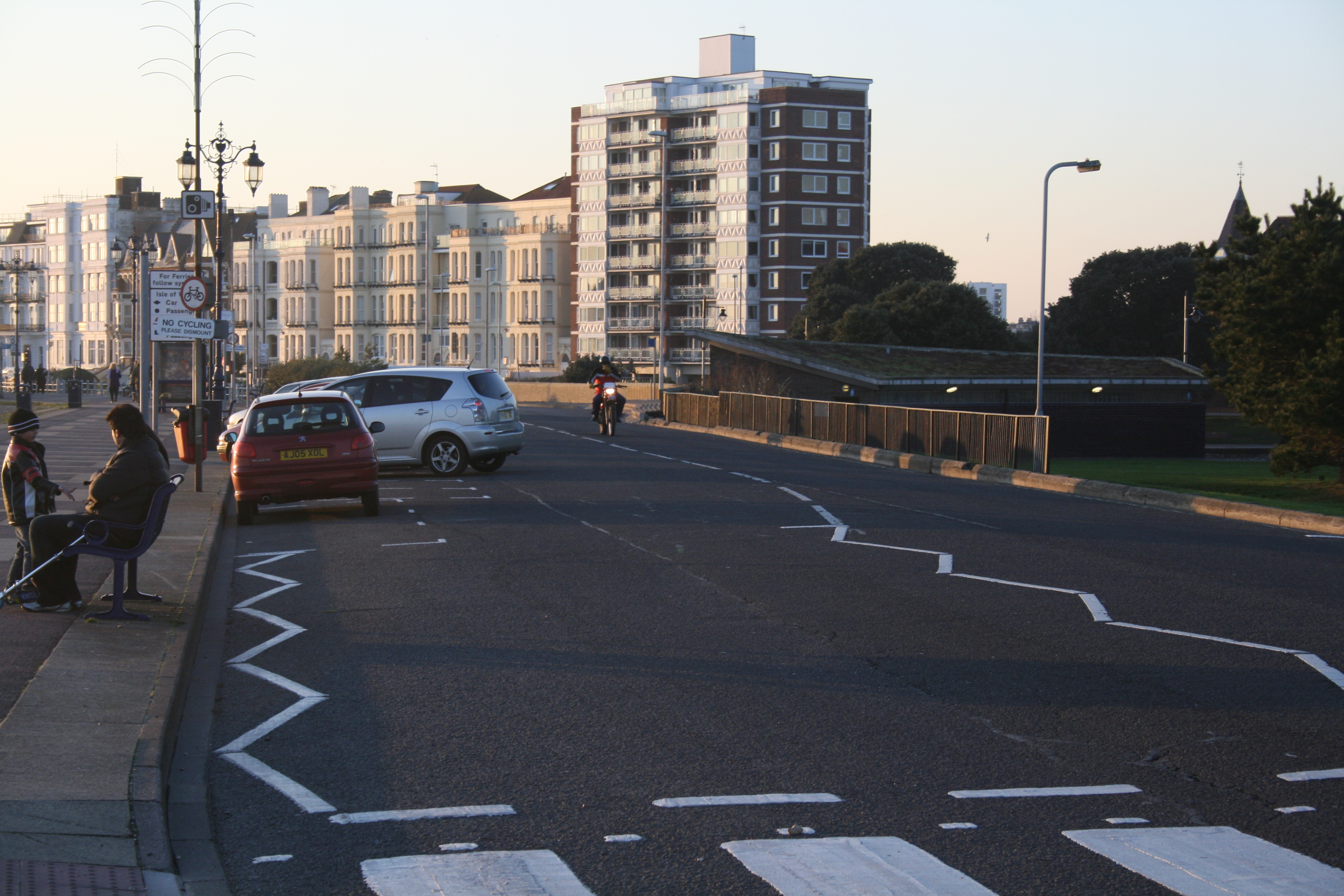
Angle parking along the Southsea seafront, England.

Angle parking, known as echelon parking in Britain, is similar to perpendicular parking for these vehicles, except that cars are arranged at an angle to the aisle (an acute angle with the direction of approach). The gentler turn allows easier and quicker parking, narrower aisles, and thus higher density than perpendicular parking. While in theory the aisles are one-way, in practice they are typically wide enough to allow two cars to pass slowly when drivers go down the aisles the wrong way.

Angle parking is very common in car parking lots. It may also be used in streetside car parking in the U.S. when there is more width available for car parking than would be needed for parallel parking of cars, as it creates a larger number of parking spaces. Some cities have utilized angled parking on-street (as compared to off-street parking facilities).

This has been done mostly in residential, retail and mixed-use areas where additional parking compared to parallel parking is desired and traffic volumes are lower. Most angled parking is designed in a head-in configuration while a few cities (Seattle, Portland, Baltimore, and Indianapolis are examples) have some back-in angled parking (typically on hills or low traffic volume streets).

Angle parking is considered dangerous by cycling organizations, especially in the head-in configuration, despite the increased visibility when reversing out of the space compared with reversing out of a perpendicular parking space. When comparing to parallel parking:

1. There is a significant risk to cyclists from vehicles reversing out, as approaching bicycles are in the blind spot of the reversing and turning vehicles.
2. Longer vehicles project further into the road; this can inconvenience/endanger other road users,
3. The "surplus" road space which enables angle parking could also be used for bicycle lanes.

Hence organisations such as the Cyclists Touring Club are usually opposed to all proposed echelon parking schemes, though there are some alternatives, such as back-in angle parking (slanted the "wrong" way, with the driver reversing into the space, rather than reversing out), which can overcome many of the issues of safety.

=== Other parking methods ===
Besides these basic modes of motor vehicle parking, there are instances where a more ad hoc approach to arranging motor vehicles is appropriate. For example, in parts of some large cities, such as Chicago and Bangalore, where land is expensive and therefore parking space is at a premium, there are formal and informal parking lots for motor vehicles where the driver leaves the keys to the vehicle with an attendant who arranges vehicles so as to maximize the number of vehicles that can be parked in the lot.

Vehicles may be packed up to five vehicles deep in combinations of perpendicular and/or parallel parking with limited circulation aisles for the parking attendant. Such arrangements are known as attendant parking. When the lot or facility is provided to serve the customers of a business, it is considered valet parking.

Inner city parking lots are often temporary, the operators renting land which is vacant pending the construction of a new office building. Some inner city lots are equipped with individual lifts, allowing cars to be stored above each other.

Another ad hoc arrangement is tandem parking. This is sometimes done with residential motor vehicle parking where two motor vehicles park nose-to-end in tandem. The first motor vehicle does not have independent access, and the second motor vehicle must move to provide access. As with attendant parking, the purpose is to maximize the number of motor vehicles that can park in a limited space. Formalised tandem parking will sometimes be sanctioned by local planning authorities for staff parking arrangements require additional parking in limited spaces.

== Marks and space size ==
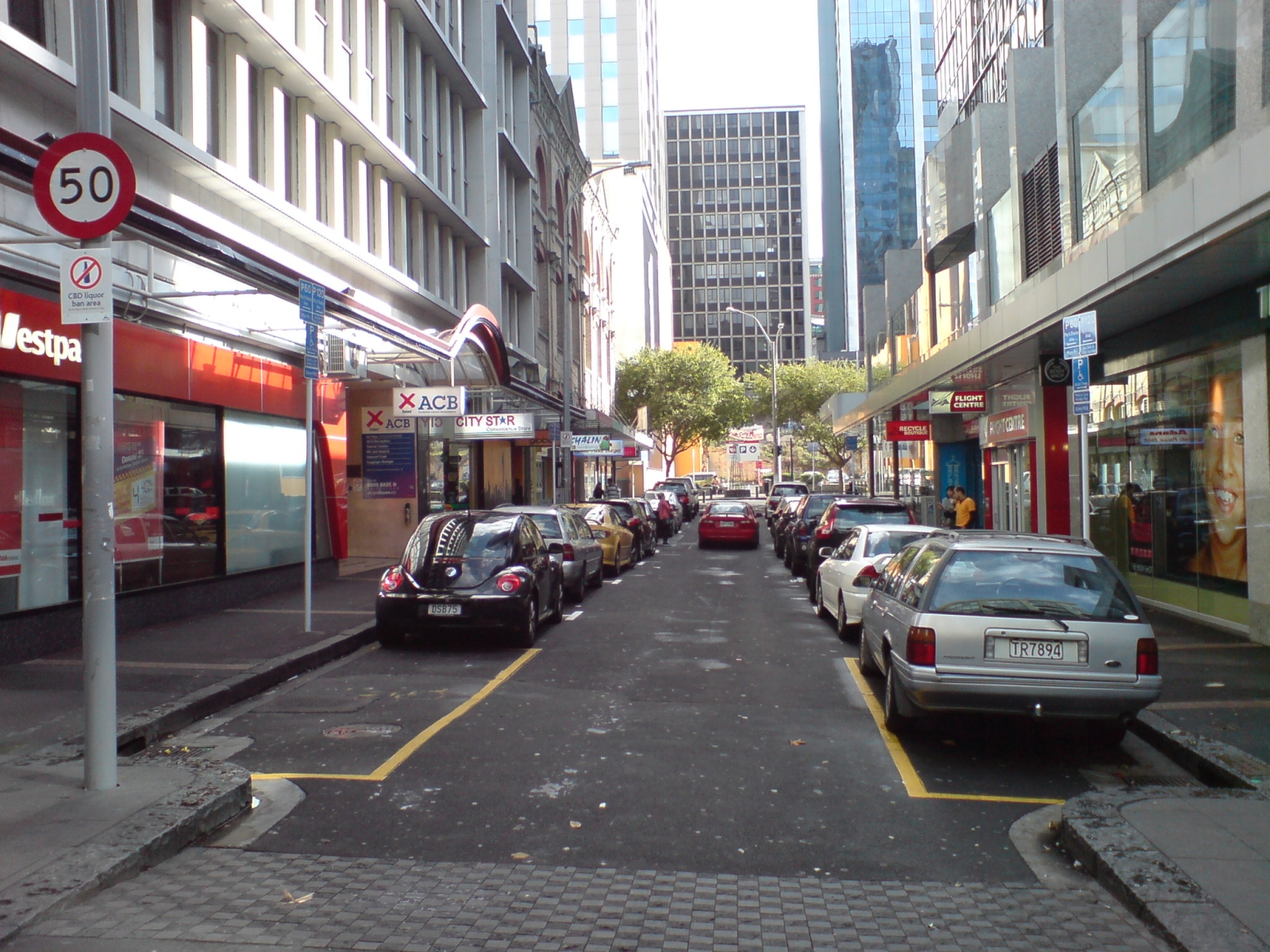
Street with spaces marked for parallel parking

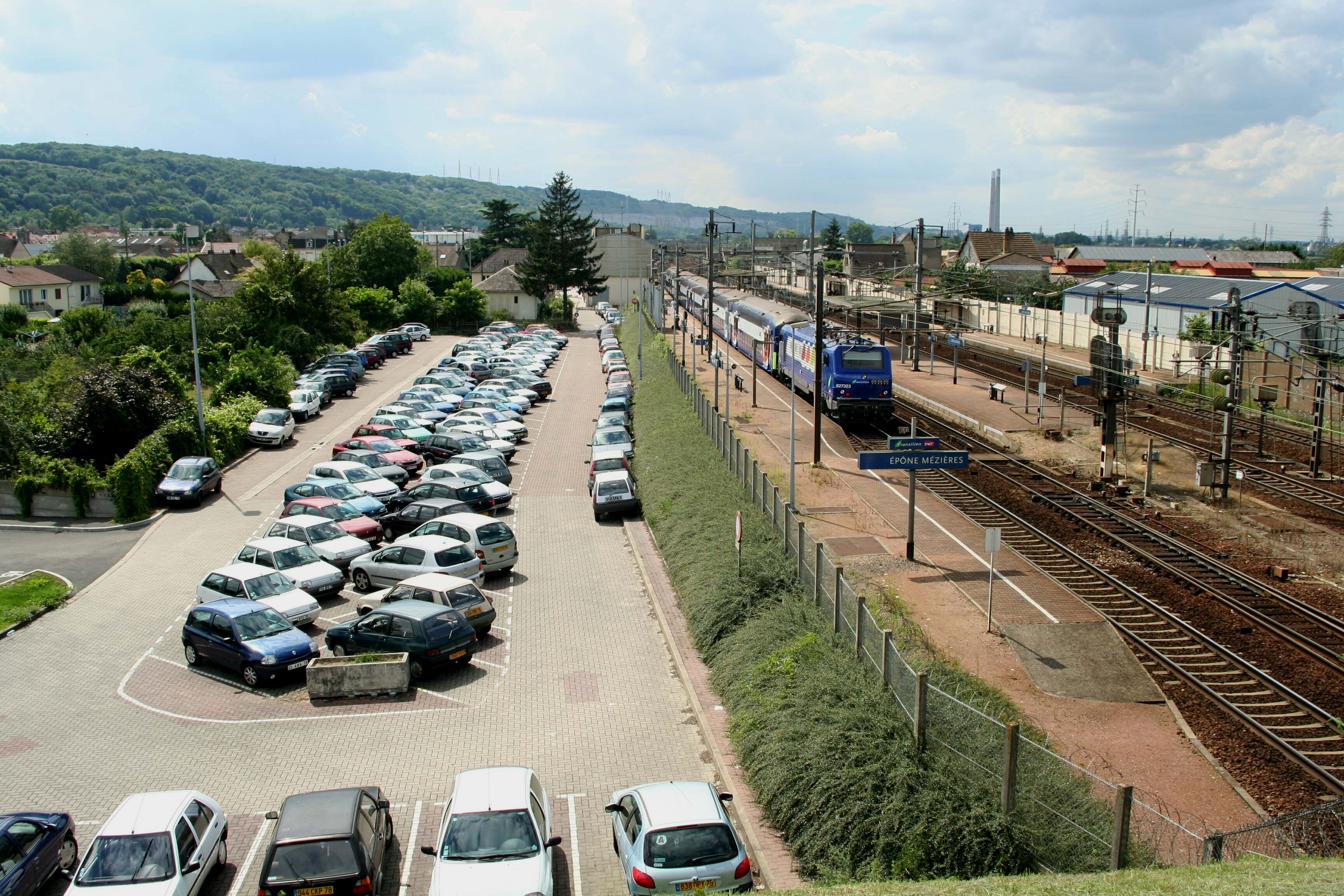
Parking lot in Épône railstation (France).

In parking lots (car parks in British English), parking is allowed only where marked.

In the US, minimum width standards of parking spaces usually range from 8.5 to 9.0 feet (2.6–2.7 m). Angled and perpendicular spaces may need to be wide to allow doors to open, while parallel parking spots may be narrower on low-traffic neighborhood streets.

Because the boundary between the parking space and the driving area is not always well-defined, the length of a parking space is more difficult to establish. However, most angled and perpendicular spaces are considered to be between 10 and 18 feet (3.0–5.5 m) in length. In the United States, due to vehicles being larger on average than some other countries, a parking space 10 feet (3.0 m) deep is uncommon and most parking spaces will be within 16 to 20 feet (4.9–6.1 m), with 19 feet (5.8 m) feet deep being the standard DOT recommended depth for standard perpendicular parking. Parallel parking spaces typically range from 20 to 24 feet (6.1–7.3 m) long.

During construction, the specific dimensions of a parking space are decided by a variety of factors. A high cost of land will encourage smaller dimensions and the introduction of compact spaces. Many garages and parking lots have spaces designated for a Compact car only. These spaces are narrower than traditional spaces, thus allowing more cars to park.

According to French standard "Norme NF P 91-100", minimum width of parking spaces range from 2.20 to 2.30 metres (7.2–7.5 ft) (See fr:Marquage du stationnement en France). Narrow parking spaces such as in Vevey, Switzerland, might make opening the door difficult in a larger vehicle.

Larger cars are an issue when the size of the bay is fixed. Automobile associations warn of this issue. A Swiss Association regulating parking space wants to consider this issue for 2016.

In the United Kingdom, the recommended standard parallel bay size is 2.4 metres (7.9 ft) wide by 4.8 metres (16 ft) long. Recently there has been some controversy about most UK parking spaces being too small to fit modern cars, which have grown significantly since standards were set decades ago. A new standard size of 2.6 meters wide (8.5 ft) and 5 meters long (16.4 ft) has been proposed.

In Australia, the dimensions are defined in AS2890 and are 2.4 m wide by 5.4 m long.

== Barriers ==
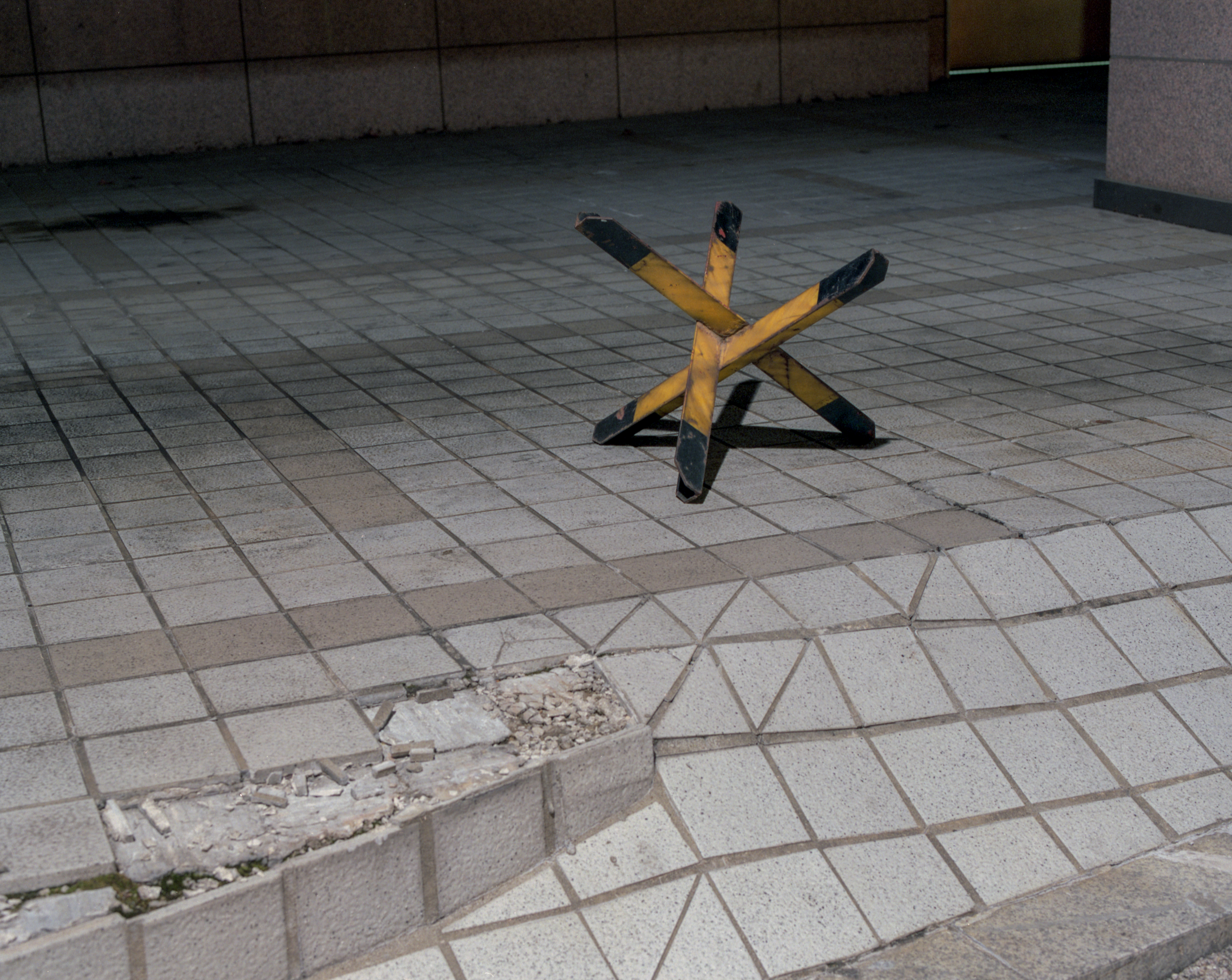
A parking obstruction bollard.

Parking spaces commonly contain a parking chock (wheel stop), which is used to prevent cars from pulling too far into the space and

- obstructing a neighboring parking space, curb, or sidewalk.
- contacting with and then damaging a building wall.

This barrier is usually made of concrete and will normally be a horizontal bar to stop the tires from moving forward or a vertical bar that may cause damage to the vehicle if contact is made. In a parking garage, the barrier will often be a concrete wall.

== Parking spaces for the disabled ==
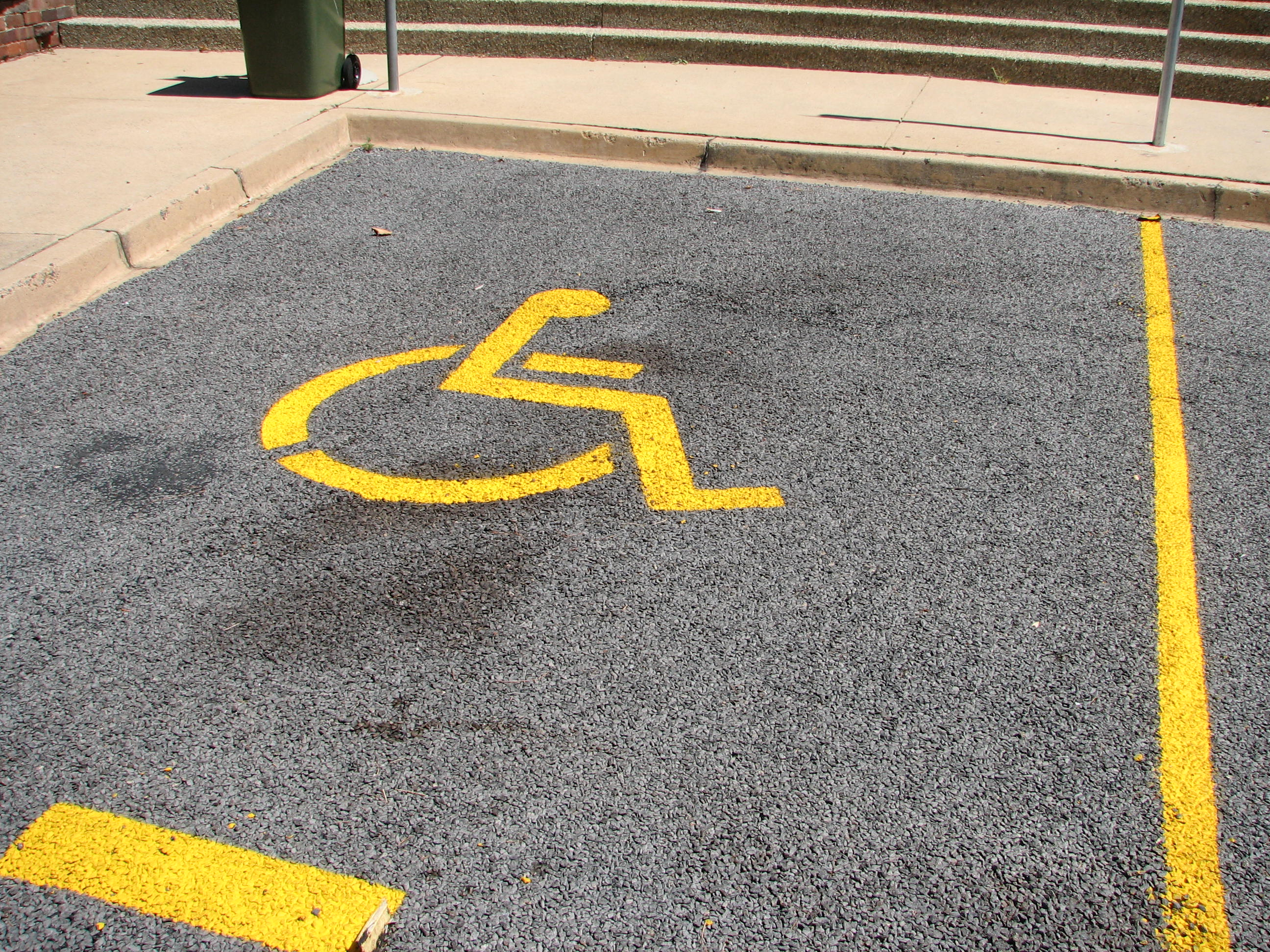
An example of a disabled parking place.

Some parking spaces are reserved as disabled-accessible parking, for individuals with disabilities. Disabled parking spaces are typically marked with the International Symbol of Access, though in practice, the design of the symbol varies widely.

In the United States the Access Board provides guidelines on parking spaces.

== Women's parking spaces ==
In some countries, women's parking spaces have been established in more visible spots to reduce the chance of sexual attacks, facilitate parking for women, or to provide spaces that are closer to shopping centers or employment.

== Variable street parking ==
=== United Kingdom ===
Painted lines on the road prohibiting parking come in yellow or red, and in single or double, as defined by The Traffic Signs Regulations and General Directions 2016 (TSRGD). Whilst double lines prohibit either parking or stopping entirely, single lines, accompanied by a sign, are time-dependent. Single yellow lines allow for parking within certain times of day, days of the week, and may have restrictions on time stayed, time not to return within, and parking charges. Single red lines allow for parking, waiting, or loading within certain times, but are otherwise designated 'no stopping' areas.

=== United States ===
The Manual of Uniform Traffic Control Devices (MUTCD) prescribes rules on curb markings. Local highway agencies may prescribe special colors for curb markings to supplement standard signs for parking regulation. California has designated an array of colors for curb regulations. A white curb designates passenger pick up or drop off. The green curb is for time limited parking. The yellow curb is for loading, and the blue curb is for disabled persons with proper vehicle identification. The red curb is for emergency vehicles only - fire lanes (no stopping, standing, or parking).

In Oregon and Florida, the yellow curb is utilized to indicate no parking. In Georgia either red or yellow can be used to indicate no parking. In Seattle, Washington, alternating red and yellow curb markings indicate a bus stop.

== See also ==
- Back-in angle parking
- Parking chair (for snowstorms)
