= SFpark =

San Francisco parking management system

SFpark is San Francisco's system for managing the availability of both on- and off-street parking. Taking effect in April 2011, the program utilizes smart parking meters that change their prices according to location, time of day, and day of the week, with the goal of keeping about 15% of spaces vacant on any given block. The San Francisco Municipal Transportation Agency launched the system with congestion mitigation funding from the Federal Highway Administration in July 2010 as a fallback from a downtown cordon. It is one of several such systems in the world. The City of Calgary, Canada and the Calgary Parking Authority with their ParkPlus system have been using a similar demand based pricing model since 2008.

The system seeks to reduce the time and fuel wasted by drivers searching for an open space. Parking usage is monitored via sensors placed in the asphalt, and the availability and prices can be checked via SFpark.org, iPhone and Android apps, and cell phone. Prices can range from a minimum of 25¢ to a maximum of $7 per hour during normal hours, with a $18 per hour cap for special events such as baseball games or street fairs. As of April 2013, prices range from 25¢ to $7.00 per hour during normal hours. In addition to the on-street parking, fourteen city-owned garages are included in the program.

This concept of market-based variable pricing or "performance parking" has long been advocated by transportation researcher Donald Shoup, now an adviser on the project.

== Results ==
By December 2012, average hourly parking rates had dropped by 14 cents from $2.73 to $2.59, SFMTA's revenue from parking citations dropped from 45% to 20% of total parking revenue, and 6% of the new meters charged 25¢ an hour.

A March 2014 study found that SFpark met its 60–80% occupancy goal and that cruising for parking is down by 50%.

A 2016 economic study found a dramatic positive benefit of the SFpark Project: subsequent price changes squeeze more blocks into the target occupancy range of 60–80%, reducing the number of blocks with very high or very low occupancy rates as well as, more generally, the number of blocks not meeting occupancy goals. The study notes that this finding does not mean that the occupancy rate on any particular block is more stable but rather that overall variability in occupancy rates across blocks decreases, on average, through performance-based price changes. If individuals can more reliably and quickly find parking spaces (i.e. if target occupancy rates are met more frequently on aggregate), then each vehicle trip does not need to be padded with additional travel time to "cruise" for a vacant space.

== City-wide expansion ==
The SFpark program was expanded to the entire city's 28,000 parking meters, from the pilot's 7,000 meters, in early 2018. Future rate adjustments for the meters will apply to the entire city.
