= Steve Heminger =

American businessman (born 1959/1960)

Executive Director of the Metropolitan Transportation Commission
- In office January 1, 2001 – February 28, 2019
- Preceded by: Lawrence Dahms
- Succeeded by: Therese Watkins McMillan

Personal details
- Born: 1959 or 1960 (age 65–66)
- Party: Democratic
- Education: Georgetown University (BA); University of Chicago (MA)

Steve Heminger served as the former executive director of the San Francisco Bay Area's Metropolitan Transportation Commission (MTC) from 2001 until his retirement in 2019. Since then, he has been serving as a director for the San Francisco Municipal Transportation Agency (SFMTA).

== Early life and education ==
Heminger received his bachelor's degree from Georgetown University and his master's degree from the University of Chicago.

== Career ==
Prior to joining MTC, Heminger served as Vice President for Transportation for the Bay Area Council, and as a staff assistant for various local, state, and federal governments, including the San Francisco Board of Supervisors, California State Legislature and United States Congress. At MTC, Heminger started as the manager of Legislation and Public Affairs in 1993; he was promoted to deputy executive director in 1999 and executive director in 2001.

In 2005, Heminger was appointed by Speaker of the House Nancy Pelosi of California to serve on the National Surface Transportation Policy and Revenue Study Commission. The commission, formed by SAFETEA-LU, expired on July 7, 2008.

Heminger, a Democrat, has been active in transportation politics, and he has recommended that the federal gasoline tax be raised by forty cents per gallon. He was also a possible candidate to be President Barack Obama's nominee as Secretary of Transportation. Obama would ultimately choose Ray LaHood to fill the Transportation post.

Heminger's leadership at the MTC has been controversial, in regards to his extensive foreign travel at public expense, the problematic construction management of the new eastern span replacement of the San Francisco–Oakland Bay Bridge, and the decision to spend substantial transportation funds on the acquisition of a new MTC regional headquarters, supporting a move from Oakland to San Francisco, which was projected to cost $48 million but later increased to $218 million.

Heminger became the executive director of the Association of Bay Area Governments (ABAG) in July 2017 after ABAG and MTC merged. He retired from the executive director positions of both ABAG and MTC on February 28, 2019 and was appointed to the Board of Directors for the SFMTA by Mayor London Breed later that year. Heminger represents SFMTA on the Peninsula Corridor Joint Powers Board, the authority that operates Caltrain. In addition, he serves as a Senior Fellow for the University of California at Berkeley's Institute of Transportation Studies.
