= Back-in angle parking =

On-street parking strategy to improve safety

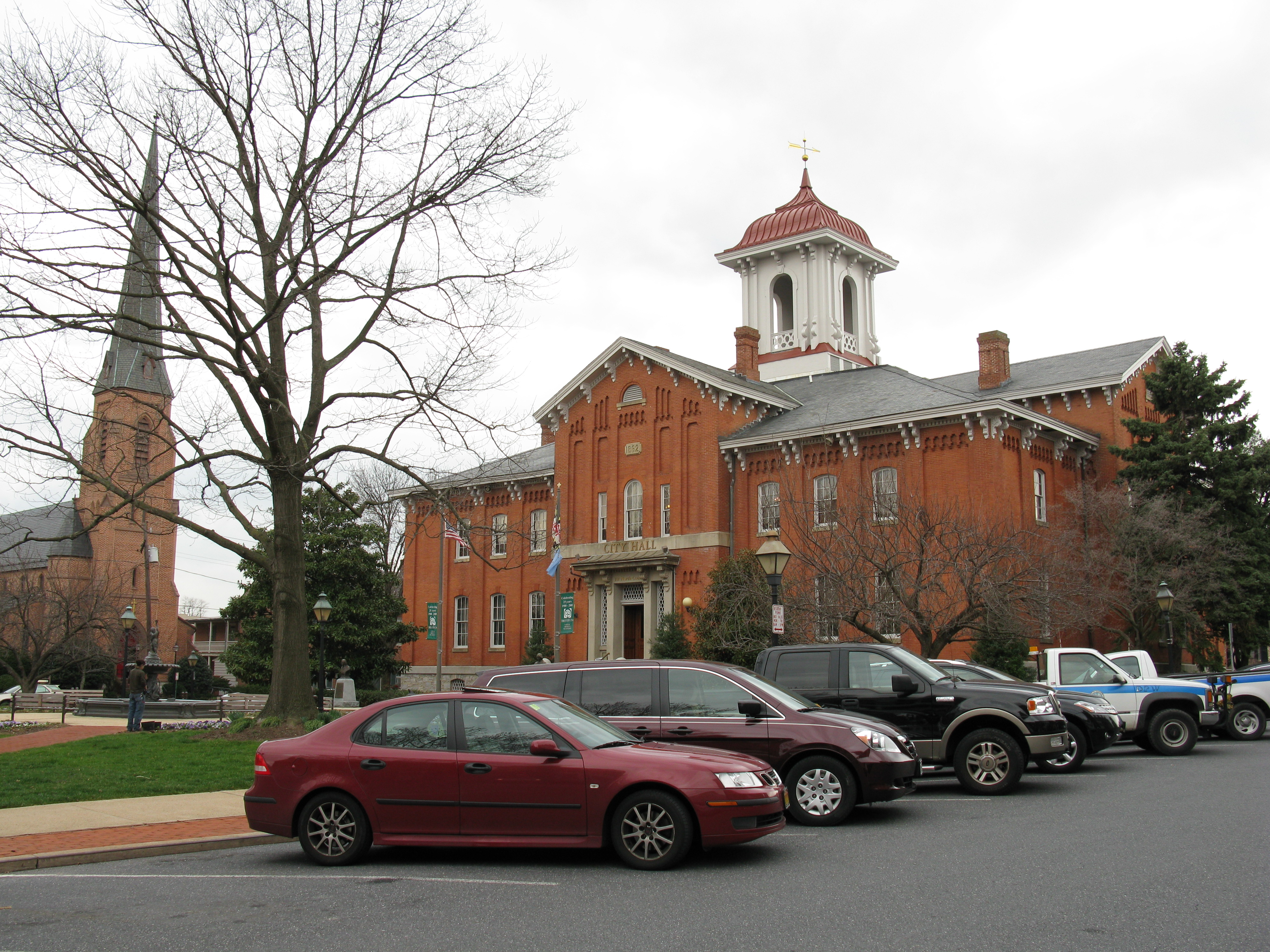
Back-in angle parking along Council Street in Frederick, Maryland, USA

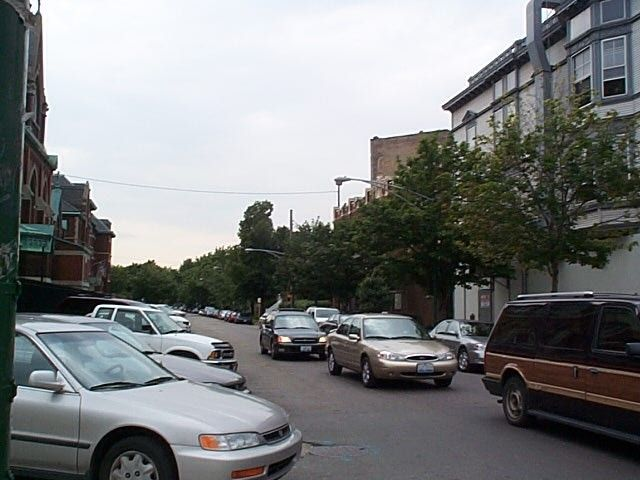
Back-in angle parking in Chicago, Illinois, USA

Back-in angle parking, also called back-in diagonal parking, reverse angle parking, reverse diagonal parking, or (in the United Kingdom) reverse echelon parking, is a traffic engineering technique intended to improve the safety of on-street parking.

For back-in parking, vehicles preparing to enter a parking space drive slightly past the space, signal, swing out and then back into the space. When leaving the space, drivers have an unobstructed view of traffic and can enter the traffic stream directly. In comparison, drivers using traditional pull-in angle parking (entering the parking space with the front first) often have difficulty seeing other traffic as they back out of the space when leaving again, resulting in traffic delays and considerable risk of collisions with pedestrians, bicyclists, and vehicles.

Existing pull-in angle parking spaces can be converted to back-in angle parking by re-striping to flip the angle of the stall markings. Streets with parallel parking have also been converted to back-in angle parking. In either case, the pavement markings are often augmented with signage indicating that vehicles must be backed in.

== Advantages ==
According to the Pedestrian & Bicycle Information Center, back-in angle parking provides motorists with better vision of pedestrians, bicyclists, motor vehicles, and other road users as they exit a parking space and enter moving traffic. Back-in angle parking also eliminates much of the difficulty that drivers, especially older drivers, have when backing into moving traffic.

In Tucson, back-in angle parking greatly reduced the number of cyclist motor vehicle collisions. The vehicle positioning associated with back-in angle parking allows eye contact and verbal or non-verbal communication between exiting drivers and other road users. Back-in angle parking positions the back of the vehicle next to the sidewalk/footway, enabling easier loading and unloading of the trunk/boot. It also positions the driver and passengers (including children) to enter and exit the vehicle towards the sidewalk instead of stepping toward traffic.

In some cities, parallel parking adjacent to bicycle lanes is permitted. This puts the bike lane in the dangerous door zone, but angle parking eliminates this hazard. Compared to parallel parking, reverse angle parking often provides more parking spaces in a given length of street, though this will vary depending on site conditions such as street width and the locations of driveways and fire hydrants.

== Disadvantages ==
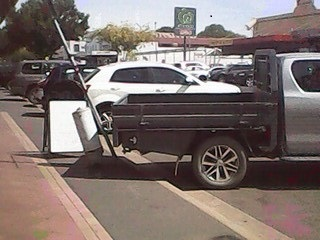
Damage to street furniture

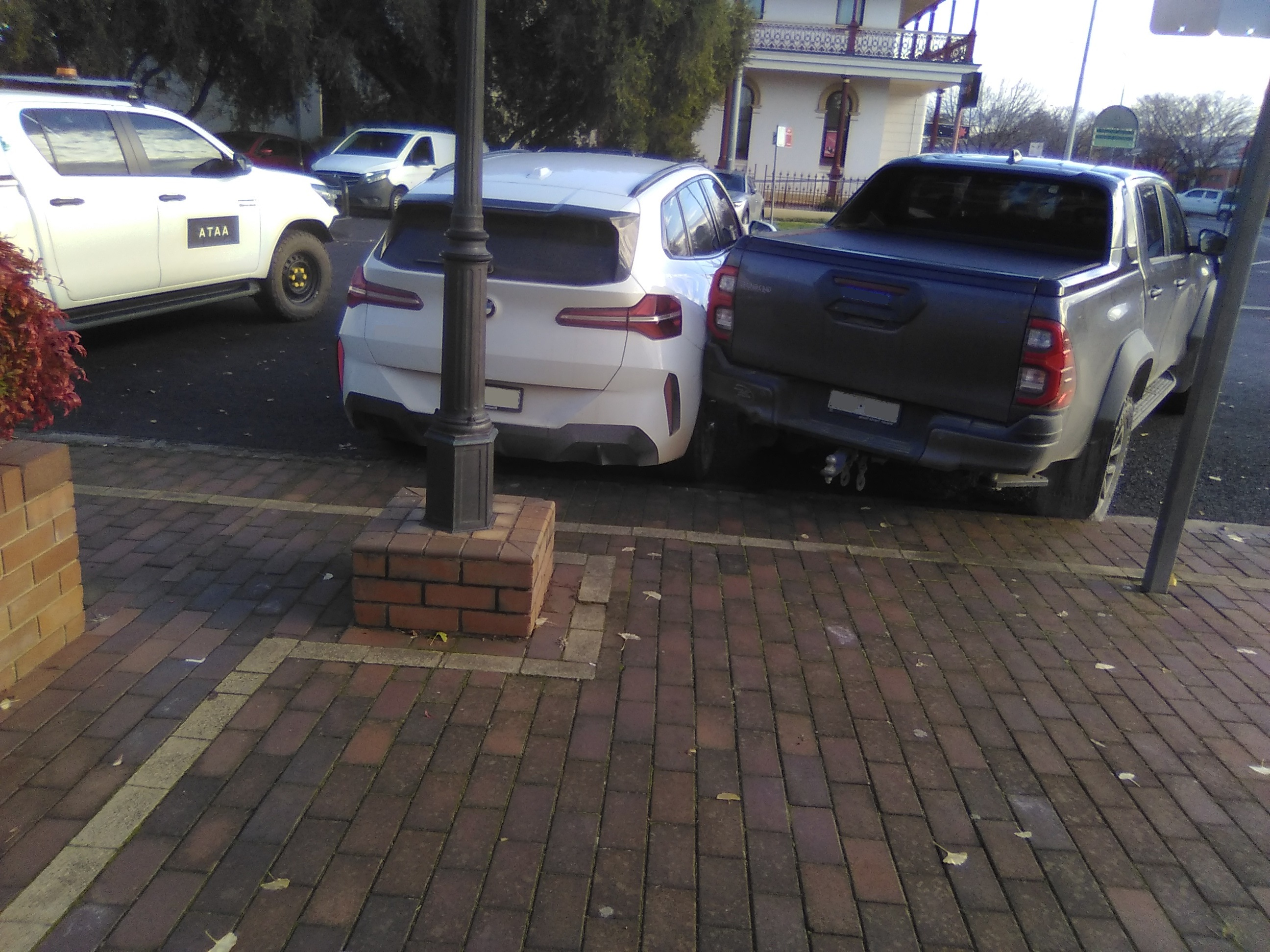
Care is needed

The primary disadvantage of back-in angle parking is that some drivers find the backing maneuver awkward, particularly if they have limited backing experience or the vehicle has poor rearward visibility. This can be overcome by intelligent use of side mirrors and reversing cameras, though blind spots can remain. Another criticism is that exhaust emissions may annoy pedestrians and residents nearby. Inexperienced drivers may take a wider clearance from an adjacent vehicle, resulting in less efficient use of available space. Also, when backing into a relatively enclosed area (e.g., a solid wall or stall), unseen pedestrians may more easily be injured, since visibility behind the vehicle is more limited. In standard angle parking, the driver takes very little time to park, and waits for a gap in the traffic before backing out, whereas back-in angle parking forces traffic to wait until the maneuver is completed, compounding gridlock and congestion problems.

In 2015, the city of Fremont, California reverted its experiment with back-in angle parking.

== See also ==
- Angle parking
