= Zone Bleue =

Former traffic zone in Paris, France

The Zone Bleue (French for Blue Zone) was a special traffic zone in the inner city of Paris in the decades after World War II. It was restricted to cars and lorries occupying less than 8 square metres (86 sq ft) floor space on the street.

As central Paris still required goods to be delivered, many French carrosiers started to offer special delivery vans with sunken rear lights, rolling shutters instead of doors that opened outwards, bumpers under the body instead of in front or behind, and other modifications which reduced the space they took up. Many of these vans also had raised or canvas roofs to allow them to carry more cargo while taking up less of the street.

Today the phrase "Zone Bleue" refers to areas that have time limits for parking, not only in Paris but in other French cities and in Belgium.

== See also ==
- Citroën H Van
