= Donald Shoup =

American urban planning engineer (1938–2025)

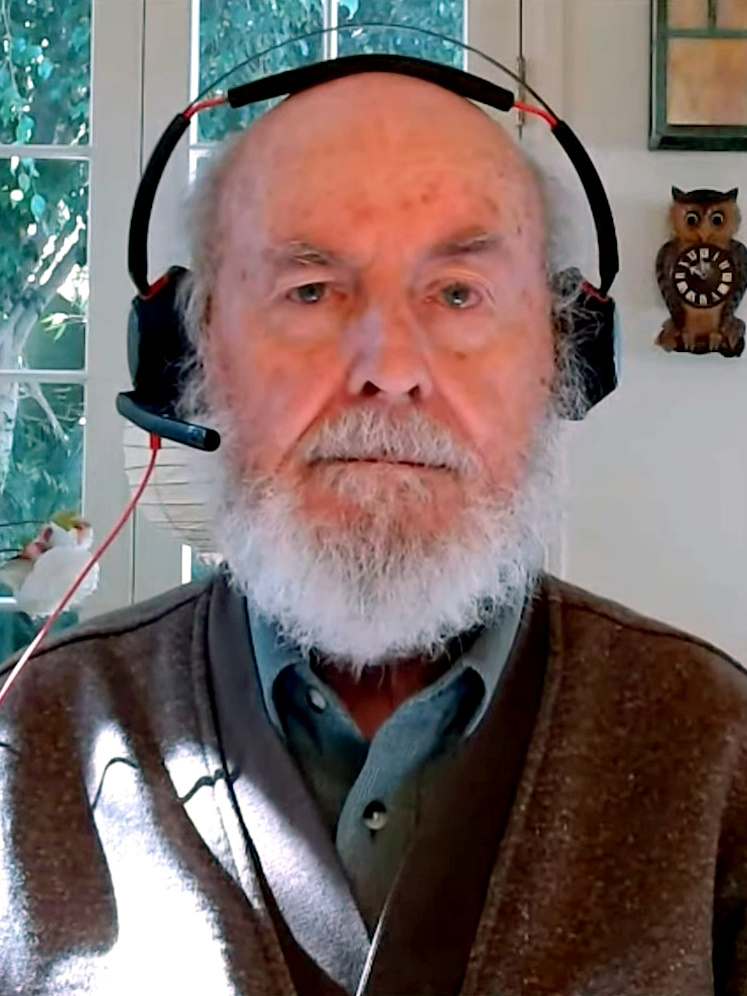
- Shoup in 2025
- Born: August 24, 1938; Long Beach, California, U.S
- Died: February 6, 2025 (aged 86); Los Angeles, California, U.S.
- Occupation: Professor
- Years active: 1968–2025
- Known for: Advocating against parking requirements in cities
- Spouse: Pat

Academic background
- Education: Yale University

Academic work
- Institutions: University of California, Los Angeles; University of Michigan
- Notable works: The High Cost of Free Parking
- Website: www.shoupdogg.com

Donald Curran Shoup (August 24, 1938 – February 6, 2025) was an American economist and professor of urban planning. He was a research professor of urban planning at University of California, Los Angeles and a noted Georgist. His 2005 book The High Cost of Free Parking identifies the negative repercussions of off-street parking requirements and relies heavily on 'Georgist' insights about optimal land use and rent distribution. In 2015, the American Planning Association awarded Shoup the "National Planning Excellence Award for a Planning Pioneer."

== Early life ==
Shoup was born in Long Beach, California, on August 24, 1938. When he was two years old, his family moved to Honolulu, Hawaii, for his father's work in the U.S. Navy.

Shoup arrived in New Haven, Connecticut as a student at Yale College, in the late 1950s at the peak of New Haven Mayor Richard C. Lee's efforts to build major parking garages and improve city traffic flow with the Oak Street Connector and other urban renewal projects.

Shoup received undergraduate degrees from Yale College in electrical engineering and economics, and a doctorate in economics from Yale in 1968.

== Career ==
After completing his PhD he headed west, assuming a post as research economist at UCLA's Institute for Government and Public Affairs. After a four-year stint as a professor at the University of Michigan, Shoup returned to UCLA as an associate professor of Urban Planning in 1974, and later was awarded a full professorship in 1980.

== Parking ==
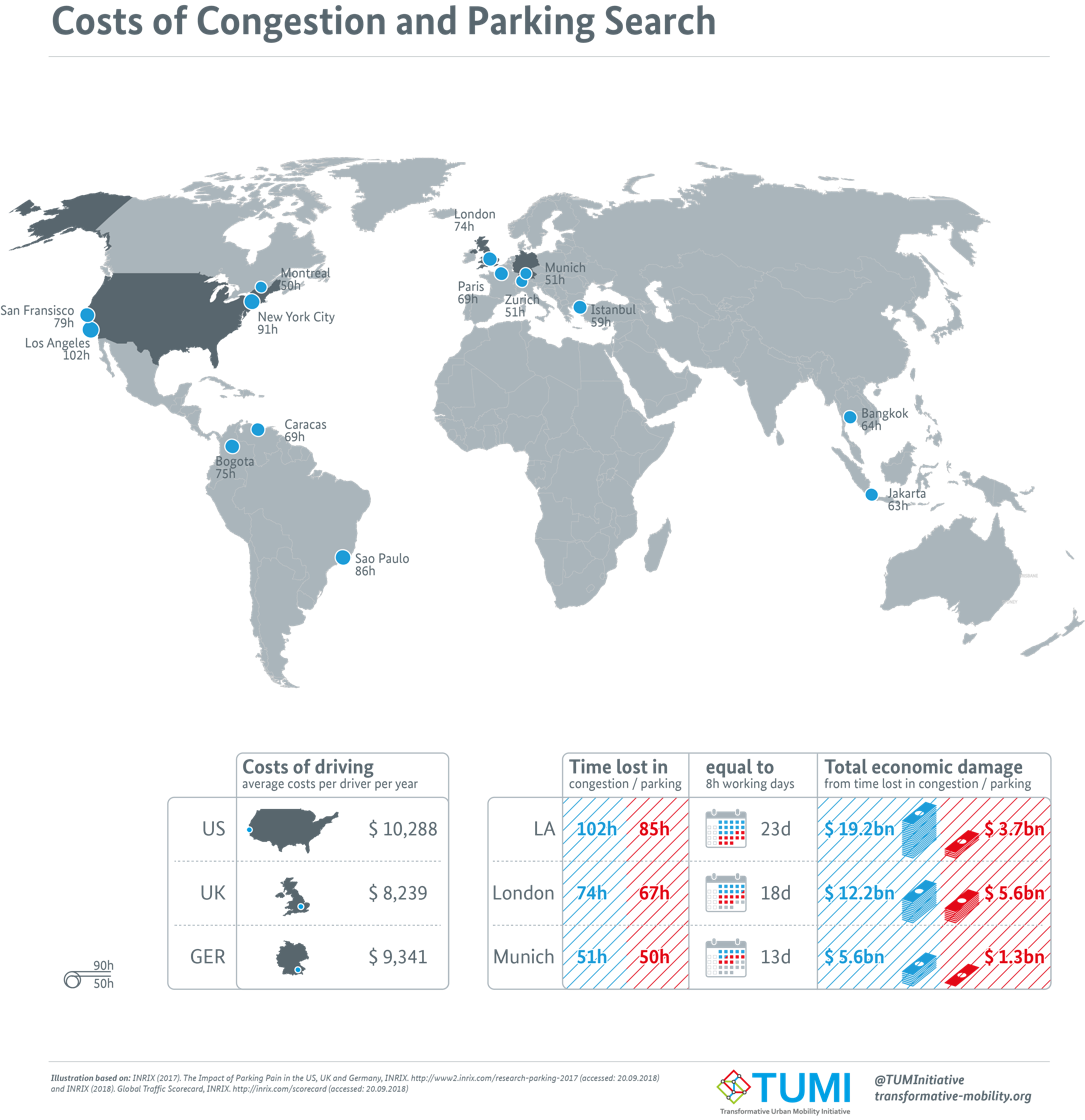
Costs of Congestion and Parking Search

Originally focused on public finance and land value tax theory, in 1975 Shoup was inspired by a master's thesis that found that Los Angeles County employees were almost twice as likely to drive alone than federal employees in the Los Angeles Civic Center due to the availability of free parking. Shoup extensively studied parking as a key link between transportation and land use, with important consequences for cities, the economy, and the environment. In a 2004 paper titled The Ideal Source of Local Public Revenue, Shoup argued for the application of Georgist tax theory to urban parking and transportation issues.

Shoup popularized the theory that an 85% occupancy rate of on-street parking spaces would be the most efficient use of public parking. When cars at any given destination in a city (a block or group of blocks) occupy more than 85% of on-street parking spaces, then cars arriving at that destination are forced to circle the block for a few minutes in order to find an unoccupied parking space. This small search time per car creates a surprisingly large amount of traffic congestion because, typically, many cars are searching for parking simultaneously during peak driving times. This wastes time and fuel and increases air pollution. Shoup called this phenomenon of excess driving resulting from under-priced parking "cruising for parking".

His research on employer-paid parking led to the passage of California's parking cash-out law, and to changes in the Internal Revenue Code to encourage parking cash out. His research on municipal parking policies has led numerous cities throughout the United States to change the price of curb parking and to dedicate the resulting parking meter revenue to finance added public services in the metered districts. Shoup has also been cited as inspiring many cities throughout the United States to lessen and eliminate parking minimums. In addition, Shoup himself also personally engaged with municipalities to try to change their parking policies.

Shoup was a Fellow of the American Institute of Certified Planners, and served as Director of the Institute of Transportation Studies and as Chair of the Department of Urban Planning at UCLA. He served as a visiting scholar at the University of Hawaii, Cambridge University, and the World Bank. Shoup also served on the advisory board of the Parking Reform Network.

== Personal life and death ==
Shoup lived in Los Angeles with his wife, Pat. He died at home from a stroke on February 6, 2025, at the age of 86.

== Bibliography ==
=== Books ===
- Shoup, Donald C.; Mack, Ruth P. (1968). Advance Land Acquisition by Local Governments; benefit-cost analysis as an aid to policy. Institute for Public Administration. OCLC 15905.
- Shoup, Donald; Pickrell, Don (1980). Free Parking as a Transportation Problem. United States Department of Transportation.
- Shoup, Donald C. (1997). Evaluating the Effects of Parking Cash Out: Eight Case Studies. University of California Transportation Center.
- Shoup, Donald C. (2005). Parking Cash Out. Planning Advisory Service report 532. American Planning Association. ISBN 978-1-932364-09-5.
- Shoup, Donald C. (2005). The High Cost of Free Parking. APA Planners Press. ISBN 978-1-884829-98-7.
  - The High Cost of Free Parking (Updated ed.). 2011. ISBN 978-1-932364-96-5.
- Shoup, Donald C., ed. (2018). Parking and the City. Routledge. ISBN 978-1-138-49703-0.

=== Selected articles ===
- Shoup, Donald C. (1970). "The optimal timing of urban land development" (PDF). Papers of the Regional Science Association. 25 (1): 33–44. doi:10.1007/BF01935815. ISSN 1435-5957.
- Willson, Richard W.; Shoup, Donald C. (1990). "Parking subsidies and travel choices: Assessing the evidence". Transportation. 17 (2): 141–157. doi:10.1007/BF02125333. ISSN 1572-9435.
- Shoup, Donald C. (1982). "Cashing Out Free Parking". Transportation Quarterly. 36 (3): 351–364. ISSN 0278-9434.
- Shoup, Donald C. (1995). "An Opportunity to Reduce Minimum Parking Requirements" (PDF). Journal of the American Planning Association. 61 (1): 14–28. doi:10.1080/01944369508975616. ISSN 0194-4363.
- Shoup, Donald C. (1999). "In Lieu of Required Parking" (PDF). Journal of Planning Education and Research. 18 (4): 307–320. doi:10.1177/0739456X9901800403. ISSN 0739-456X.
- Shoup, Donald C. (1999). "The trouble with minimum parking requirements" (PDF). Transportation Research Part A: Policy and Practice. 33 (7): 549–574. doi:10.1016/S0965-8564(99)00007-5. ISSN 0965-8564.
- Shoup, Donald C. (2006). "Cruising for parking". Transport Policy. Parking. 13 (6): 479–486. doi:10.1016/j.tranpol.2006.05.005. ISSN 0967-070X.
