= Dominoes =

Family of tile-based games

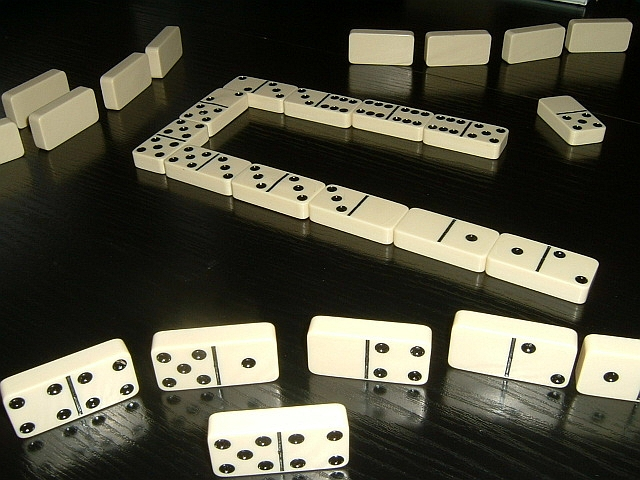
- Genres: Tile-based game
- Players: Varies depending on game
- Playing time: Varies depending on game

Dominoes are a family of tile-based games played with pieces. Each domino is a rectangular tile, usually with a line dividing its face into two square ends. Each end is marked with a number of spots (also called pips or dots) or is blank. The backs of the tiles in a set are indistinguishable, either blank or having some common design. The gaming pieces make up a domino set, sometimes called a deck or pack. The traditional European domino set consists of 28 tiles, also known as pieces, bones, rocks, stones, men, cards or just dominoes, featuring all combinations of spot counts between zero and six. A domino set is a generic gaming device, similar to playing cards or dice, in that a variety of games can be played with a set. Another form of entertainment using domino pieces is the practice of domino toppling.

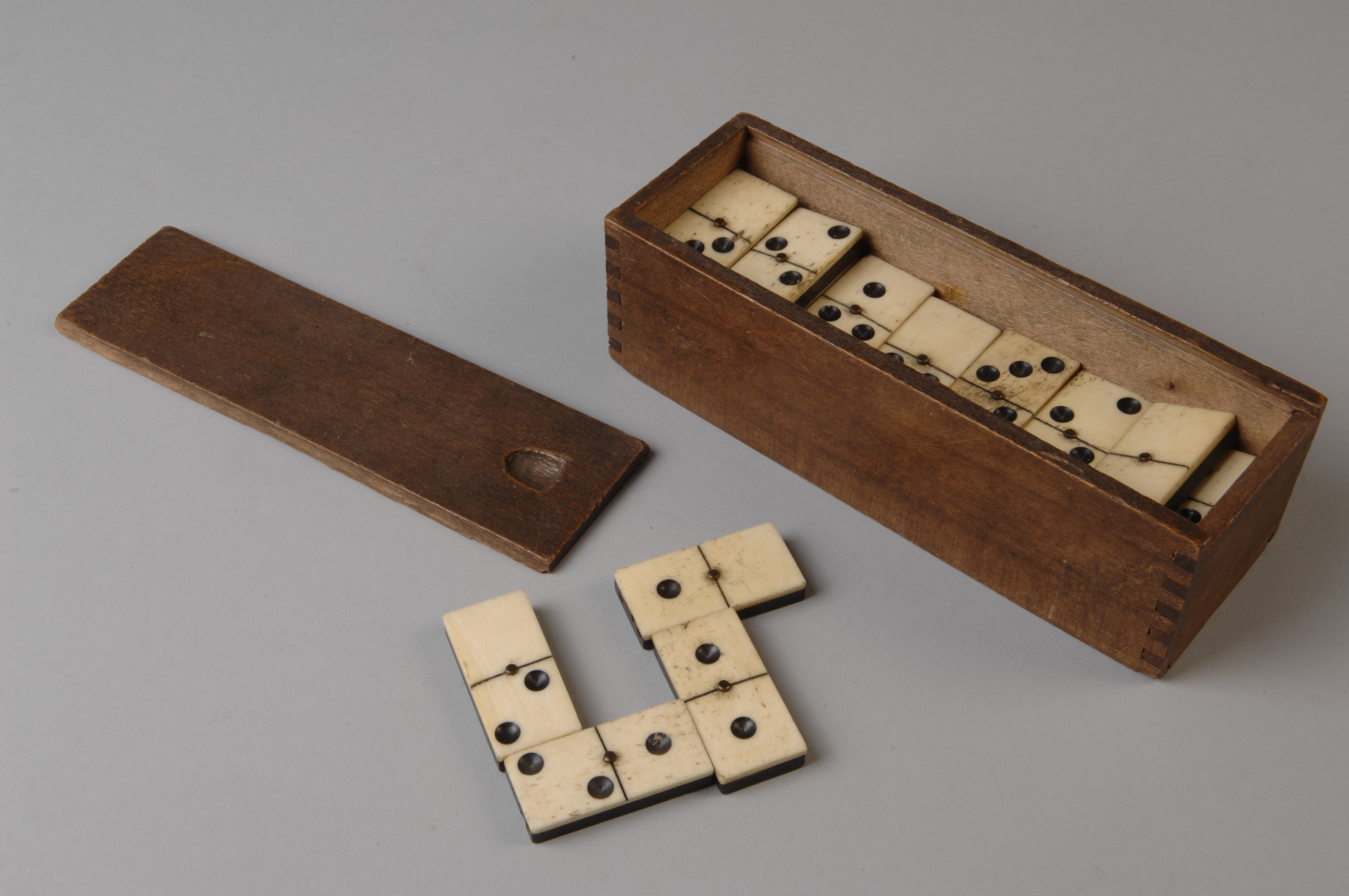
A boxed domino set dating from the late 19th or early 20th century

The earliest mention of dominoes is from Song dynasty China found in the text Former Events in Wulin by Zhou Mi (1232–1298). Modern dominoes first appeared in France during the mid-18th century, but they differ from Chinese dominoes in a number of respects, and there is no confirmed link between the two. European dominoes may have developed independently, or Italian missionaries in China may have brought the game to Europe, although there is no evidence of this.

The name "domino" is probably derived from the resemblance to a kind of carnival costume worn during the Venetian Carnival, often consisting of a black-hooded robe and a white mask. Namely, the double-one (🀹) tile looks like the domino mask. Despite the coinage of the word "polyomino" as a generalization, there is no connection between the word "domino" and the number 2 in any language. The most commonly played domino games are Domino Whist, Matador, and Muggins (All Fives). Other popular forms include Texas 42, Chicken Foot, Concentration, Double Fives, and Mexican Train. In Britain, the most popular league and pub game is Fives and Threes.

Dominoes have sometimes been used for divination, such as bone throwing in Chinese culture and in the African diaspora.

== Construction and composition of domino sets ==
European-style dominoes are traditionally made of bone, mother of pearl, ivory, or a dark hardwood such as ebony, with contrasting black or white pips which may be inlaid or painted. Some sets feature the top half thickness in mother of pearl, ivory, or bone, with the lower half in ebony. Alternatively, domino sets have been made from many different natural materials: stone (e.g., marble, granite or soapstone); other woods (e.g., ash, oak, redwood, and cedar); metals (e.g., brass or pewter); ceramic clay, or even frosted glass or crystal. These sets have a more novel look, and the often heavier weight makes them feel more substantial; also, such materials and the resulting products are usually much more expensive than polymer materials.

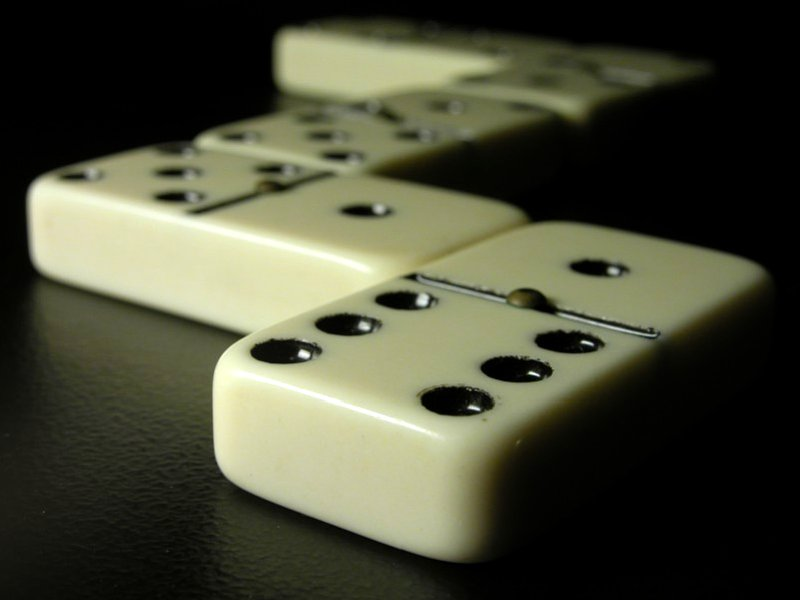
Dominoes

Modern commercial domino sets are usually made of synthetic materials, such as ABS or polystyrene plastics, or Bakelite and other phenolic resins; many sets approximate the look and feel of ivory while others use colored or even translucent plastics to achieve a more contemporary look. Modern sets also commonly use a different color for the dots of each different end value (one-spots might have black pips while two-spots might be green, three red, etc.) to facilitate finding matching ends. Occasionally, one may find a domino set made of card stock like that for playing cards. Such sets are lightweight, compact, and inexpensive, and like cards are more susceptible to minor disturbances such as a sudden breeze. Sometimes, the tiles have a metal pin (called a spinner or pivot) in the middle.

The traditional domino set contains one unique piece for each possible combination of two ends with zero to six spots, and is known as a double-six set because the highest-value piece has six pips on each end (the "double six"). The spots from one to six are generally arranged as they are on six-sided dice, but because blank ends having no spots are used, seven faces are possible, allowing 28 unique pieces in a double-six set.

However, this is a relatively small number, especially when playing with more than four people, so many domino sets are "extended" by introducing ends with greater numbers of spots, which increases the number of unique combinations of ends and thus of pieces. Each progressively larger set increases the maximum number of pips on an end by three; so the common extended sets are double-nine (55 tiles), double-12 (91 tiles), double-15 (136 tiles), and double-18 (190 tiles), which is the maximum in practice. As the set becomes larger, identifying the number of pips on each domino becomes more difficult, so some large domino sets use more readable Arabic numerals instead of pips.

== History ==
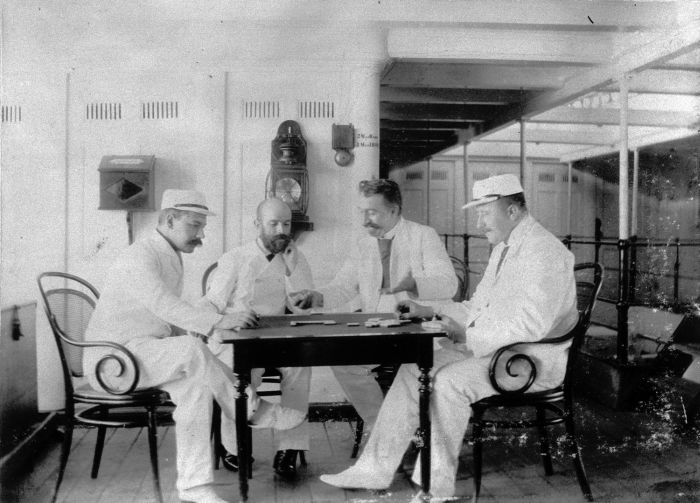
Dutch sailors playing dominoes, 1890s

=== Chinese dominoes ===
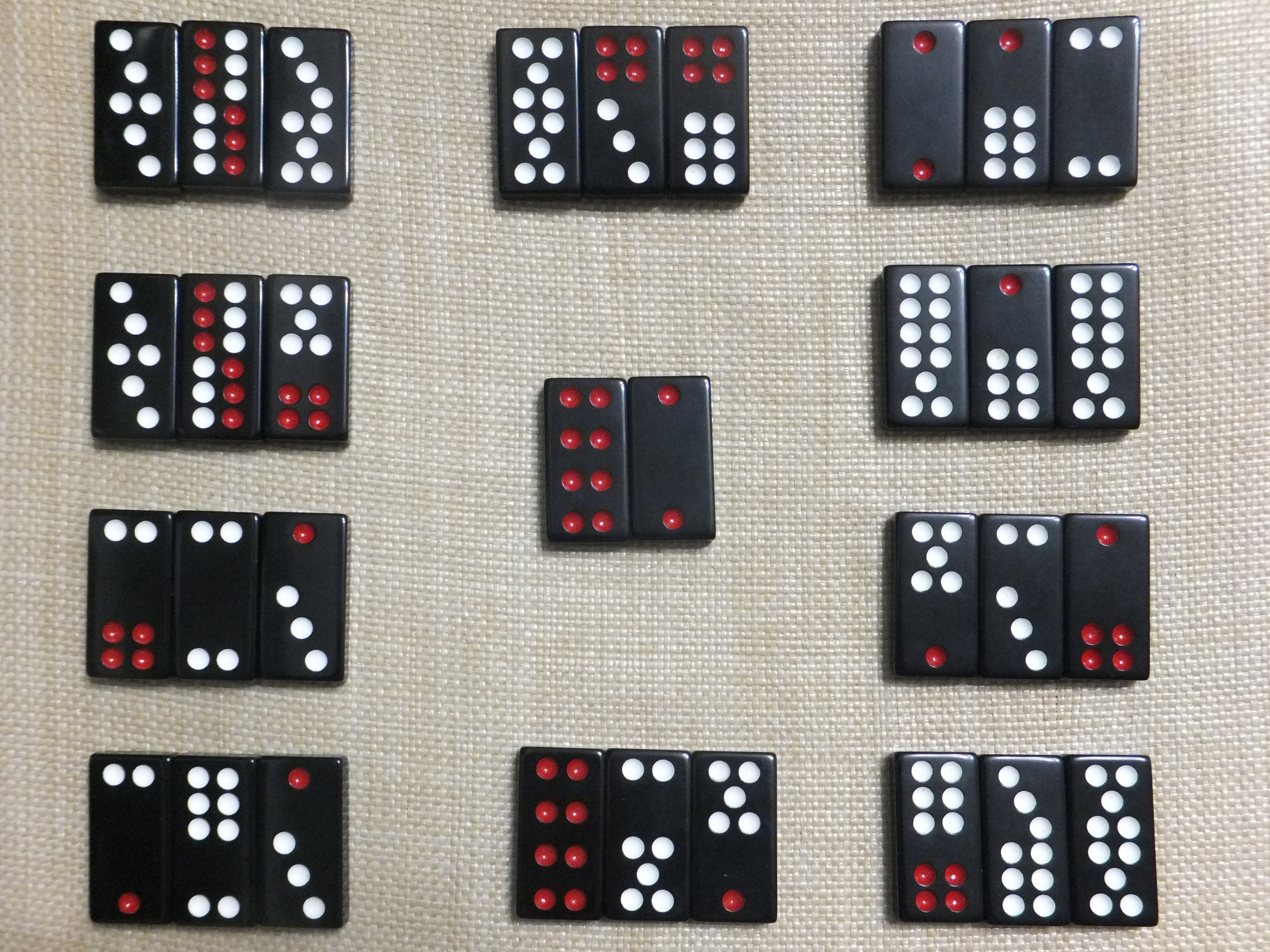
A full set of Chinese dominoes

In China, early "domino" tiles were functionally identical to playing cards. An identifiable version of Chinese dominoes developed in the 12th or 13th century.

The oldest written mention of domino tiles in China dates to the 13th century and comes from Hangzhou where pupai (gambling plaques or tiles) and dice are listed as items sold by peddlers during the reign of Emperor Xiaozong of Song (r. 1162–1189). It is not entirely clear that pupai means dominoes, but the same term is used two centuries later by the Ming author Lu Rong (1436–1494) in a context that clearly describes domino tiles. The earliest known manual on dominoes is the Manual of the Xuanhe Period which purports to be written by Qu You (1341–1427), but some scholars believe it is a later forgery.

The traditional 32-piece Chinese domino set, made to represent each possible face of two thrown dice and thus having no blank faces, differs from the 28-piece domino set found in the West during the mid 18th century, although Chinese dominoes with blank faces were known during the 17th century. Each domino originally represented one of the 21 results of throwing two six-sided dice (2d6). One half of each domino is set with the pips from one die and the other half contains the pips from the second die. Chinese sets also introduce duplicates of some throws and divide the tiles into two suits: military and civil. Chinese dominoes are also longer than typical European ones.

=== Dominoes in Europe and North America ===
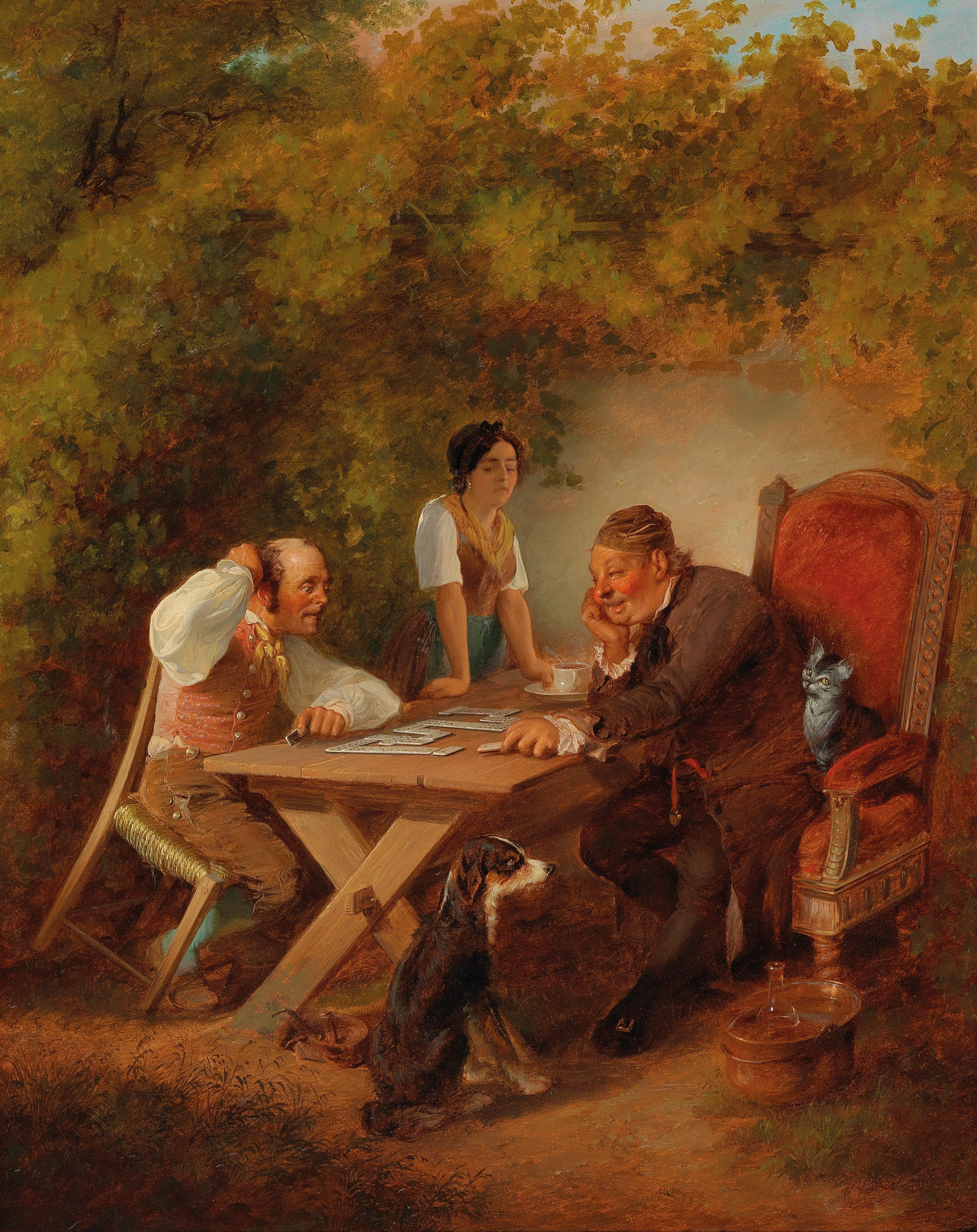
The domino players by Friedrich Sturm

Modern dominoes first appeared in France during the mid-18th century, but they differ from Chinese dominoes in a number of respects, and there is no confirmed link between the two. European dominoes may have developed independently. Having been established in France, the game of dominoes spread rapidly to Great Britain, Austria, southern Germany and Italy. The name domino does not appear before 1762, being first recorded in the magazine L’Avantcoureur, of 1st April 1762. It is in the 1771 edition of the Dictionnaire de Trévoux that "domino" as a game is recorded for the first time in a dictionary. There are two earlier recorded meanings for the French word domino, one referring to the masquerades of the period, derived from the term for the hooded garment of a priest, the other referred to crude and brightly colored woodcuts on paper formerly popular among French peasants. The way by which this word became the name of the game of dominoes is likely due to the former: the name of the masquerade costume being associated with the mask itself, and eventually transferred to the double-one (🀹) tile. The earliest game rules in Europe describe a simple block game for two or four players. Later French rules add the variant of Domino à la Pêche ("Fishing Domino"), an early draw game as well as a three-hand game with a pool.

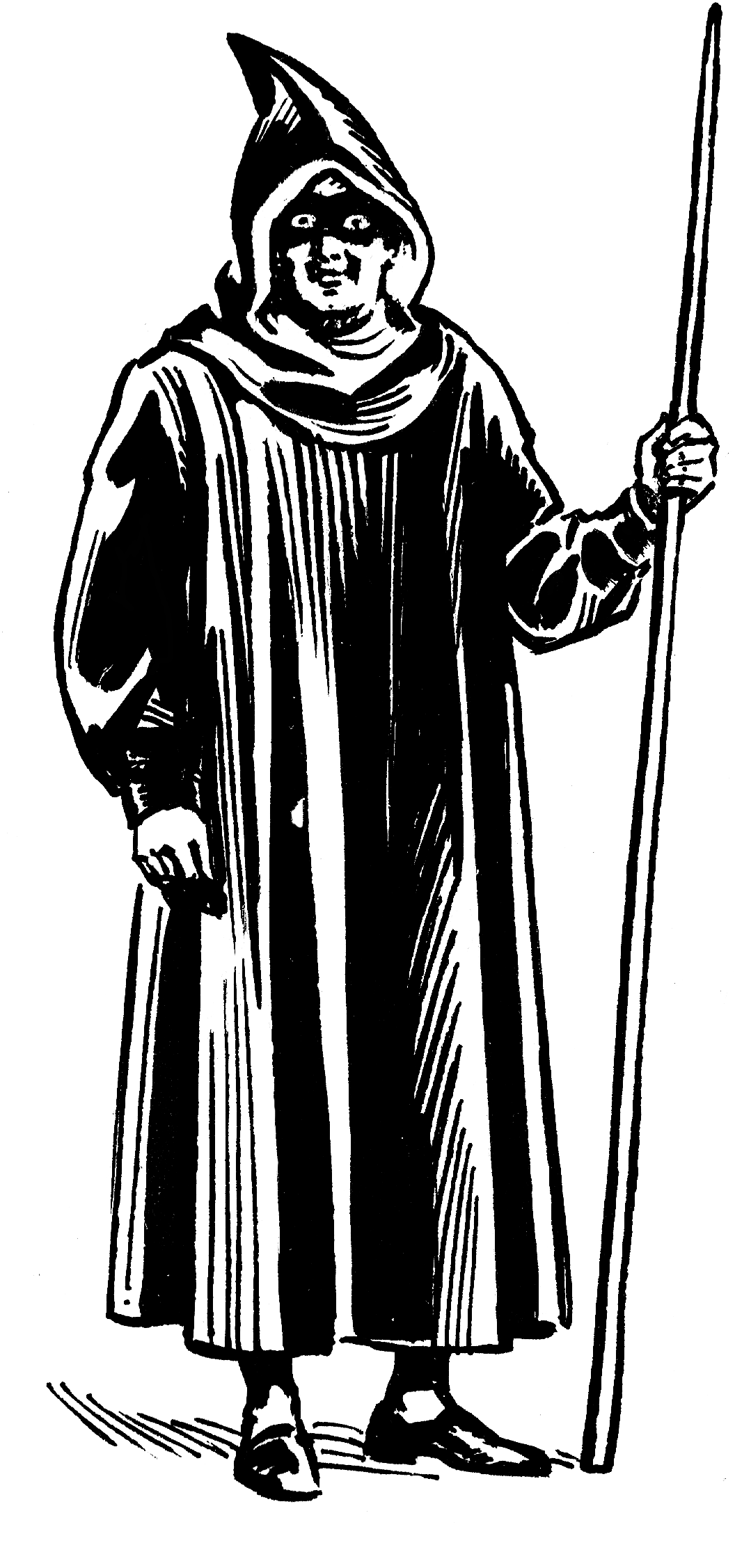
Domino costume

From France, the game was introduced to England by the late 1700s, (Note: The 1810 edition of Joseph Strutt's Glig-Gamena Angel-Deod, or, The Sports and Pastimes of the People of England reports that "this is a very childish sport, imported from France a few years back," and, in 1797, "Domino" is recorded in Sheridan's dictionary as both "the habit of a Venetian nobleman, a dress much used at masquerades" and "a sort of game.") purportedly brought in by French prisoners-of-war. The early forms of the game in England were the Block Game and Draw Game. The rules for these games were reprinted, largely unchanged, for over half a century. In 1863, a new game variously described as All Fives, Fives or Cribbage Dominoes appeared for the first time in both English and American sources; this was the first scoring game and it borrowed the counting and scoring features of cribbage, but 5 domino spots instead of 15 card points became the basic scoring unit, worth 1 game point. The game was played to 31 and employed a cribbage board to keep score. In 1864, The American Hoyle describes three new variants: Muggins, Bergen and Rounce; alongside the Block Dominoes and Draw Dominoes. In Muggins, the cribbage board was dropped, 5 spots scored 5 points, and game was now 200 for two players and 150 for three or four. Despite the name, there was no 'muggins rule' as in cribbage to challenge a player who fails to declare his scoring combinations. This omission was rectified in the 1868 edition of The Modern Pocket Hoyle, but reprints of both rule sets continued to be produced in parallel for around twenty years before the version with the muggins rule prevailed. From around 1871, however, the names of All Fives and Muggins, became conflated and many publications issued rules for 'Muggins or All Fives' or 'Muggins or Fives' without making any distinction between the two. This confusion continues to the present day with some publications equating the names and others describing All Fives as a separate game.

In 1889, dominoes was described as having spread worldwide, "but nowhere is it more popular than in the cafés of France and Belgium". From the outset, the European game was different from the Chinese one. European domino sets contain neither the military-civilian suit distinctions of Chinese dominoes nor the duplicates that went with them. Moreover, according to Michael Dummett, in the Chinese games it is only the identity of the tile that matters; there is no concept of matching. Instead, the basic set of 28 unique tiles contains seven additional pieces, six of them representing the values that result from throwing a single die with the other half of the tile left blank, and the seventh domino representing the blank-blank (🀱) combination. Subsequently 45-piece (double eight) sets appeared in Austria and, in recent times, 55-piece (double nine) and 91-piece (double twelve) sets have been produced.

All the early games are still played today alongside games that have sprung up in the last 60 years such as Five Up, Mexican Train and Chicken Foot, the last two taking advantage of the larger domino sets available.

Some modern descriptions of All Fives are quite different from the original, having lost much of their cribbage character and incorporating a single spinner, making it identical, or closely related, to Sniff. Most published rule sets for Muggins include the rule that gives the game its name, but some modern publications omit it even though the muggins rule has been described as the unique feature of this game.

Dominoes is now played internationally. It is recognized as an "ingrained cultural activity within the Caribbean" but is also popular with the Windrush generation (who have Caribbean heritage) in the UK.

In the U.S. state of Alabama, although rarely prosecuted, it was illegal to play dominoes on Sunday within the state until the relevant section of the Alabama Criminal Code was repealed, effective April 21, 2015.

== Tiles and suits ==
Complete double-six set

Dominoes (also known as bones, cards, men, pieces or tiles), are normally twice as long as they are wide, which makes it easier to re-stack pieces after use. A domino usually features a line in the middle to divide it visually into two squares, called ends. The value of either side is the number of spots or pips. In the most common variant (double-six), the values range from six pips down to none or blank. The sum of the two values, i.e. the total number of pips, may be referred to as the rank or weight of a tile; a tile may be described as "heavier" than a "lighter" one that has fewer (or no) pips.

Tiles are generally named after their two values. For instance, the following are descriptions of the tile bearing the values two and five (🁄):

- Deuce-five
- Five-deuce
- 2–5
- 5–2

A tile that has the same pips-value on each end is called a double or doublet, and is typically referred to as double-zero (🀱), double-one (🀹), and so on. Conversely, a tile bearing different values is called a single.

Every tile which features a given number is a member of the suit of that number. A single tile is a member of two suits: for example, 0-3 (🀴) belongs both to the suit of threes and the suit of blanks, or 0 suit.

In some versions the doubles can be treated as an additional suit of doubles. In these versions, the double-six (🁡) belongs both to the suit of sixes and the suit of doubles. However, the dominant approach is that each double belongs to only one suit.

The most common domino sets commercially available are double six (with 28 tiles) and double nine (with 55 tiles). Larger sets exist and are popular for games involving several players or for players looking for long domino games.

The number of tiles in a double-n set obeys the following formula:

$$\frac{(n+1)(n+2)}{2}$$

which is also the (n+1)th triangular number, as in the following table.

Relationship between the maximum number of pips on an end and the triangular numbers (values in bold are common)
n	0	1	2	3	4	5	6	7	8	9	10	11	12	13	14	15	16	17	18	19	20	21
T_{n+1}	1	3	6	10	15	21	28	36	45	55	66	78	91	105	120	136	153	171	190	210	231	253

This formula can be simplified a little bit when $n$ is made equal to the total number of doubles in the domino set:

$\frac{(n)(n+1)}{2}$

The total number of pips in a double-n set is found by:

$\frac{n(n+1)(n+2)}{2}$ i.e. the number of tiles multiplied by the maximum pip-count (n)

e.g. a 6-6 set has (7 × 8) / 2 = 56/2 = 28 tiles, the average number of pips per tile is 6 (range is from 0 to 12), giving a total pip count of 6 × 28 = 168

== Rules ==
The most popular type of play are layout games, which fall into two main categories, blocking games and scoring games.

- Most domino games are blocking games, where the objective is to empty one's hand while blocking the opponents’. In the end, blocking games may become scoring games by assigning a score determined by counting the pips in the losing players' hands.
- In scoring games, the objective is to gain a higher or lower score than the opponents'. The scoring is different and happens mostly during game play, making it the principal objective.

=== Blocking game ===
The most basic domino variant is for two players and requires a double-six set. The 28 tiles are shuffled face down and form the stock or boneyard. Each player draws seven tiles from the stock. Once the players begin drawing tiles, they are typically placed on-edge in front of the players, so players can see their own tiles, but not the value of their opponents' tiles. Players can thus see how many tiles remain in their opponents' hands at all times.

One player begins by downing (playing the first tile) one of their tiles. This tile starts the line of play, in which values of adjacent pairs of tile ends must match. The players alternately extend the line of play with one tile at one of its two ends; if a player is unable to place a valid tile, they must continue drawing tiles from the stock until they are able to place a tile. The game ends when one player wins by playing their last tile, or when the game is blocked because neither player can play. If that occurs, whoever caused the block receives all of the remaining player points not counting their own.

==== Middle Eastern version ====
A common variant of the blocking game that is played in the Middle East features four players with slightly altered rules. The stock is divided equally on all players, each having seven tiles in hand. After drawing the tiles, the player with the double-six tile starts by downing that tile on the table and the game then proceeds counter-clockwise.

Since there is no boneyard, a player without a matching tile passes their turn. A player that is unable to play is called a downed or sitting player. A less common alternation of the middle eastern game requires the player to the left of the sitting player to transfer one of their tiles (not necessarily playable) tile to the downed player. In this variant, if the transferred tile can be played, they have to down it.

Similar to a normal blocking game, the game ends when a player empties their hand or the game is blocked. If the game is blocked, the player with the lightest hand receives points equal to the sum of all losing players' hands. A set of games ends when any player reaches a set number of points, in which they win. If no player reached a winning score, the winning player from the previous round starts the next game with any tile in their hand and the game proceeds normally.

==== Spanish and Latin American version ====
Another variant of the blocking game is the Spanish and Latin American version and is played in teams of two. The stock is divided equally among all players, each having seven tiles in hand. Players sitting on opposite ends of the table are part of the same team.

The game ends when one of the players has no tiles left or when the game is blocked. In the first case, the team of the player without any tiles left earns the sum of the points left in the opposing teams' hands. When the game is blocked, the team with the least points in its hands earns the points left in the opposing teams' hands. If both teams have the same points, the team that started wins the round.

=== Draw game ===
In a draw game (blocking or scoring), players are additionally allowed to draw as many tiles as desired from the stock before playing a tile, and they are not allowed to pass before the stock is (nearly) empty. The score of a game is the number of pips in the losing player's hand plus the number of pips in the stock. Most rules prescribe that two tiles need to remain in the stock. The draw game is often referred to as simply "dominoes".

Adaptations of both games can accommodate more than two players, who may play individually or in teams.

=== Line of play ===
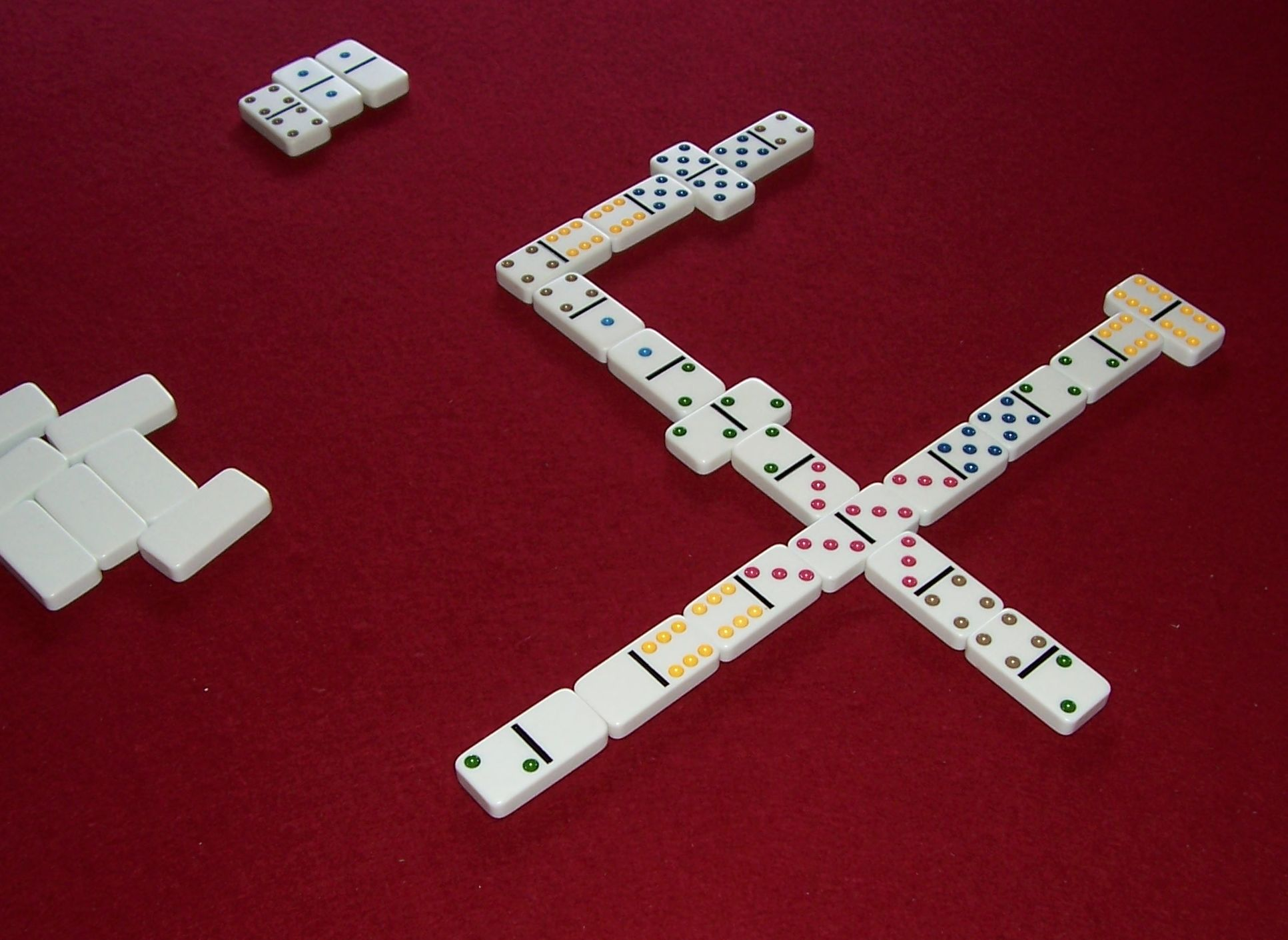
Five-Up played with multicolored tiles: the doubles serve as spinners, allowing the line of play to branch

The line of play is the configuration of played tiles on the table. It starts with a single tile and typically grows in two opposite directions when players add matching tiles. In practice, players often play tiles at right angles when the line of play gets too close to the edge of the table.

The rules for the line of play often differ from one variant to another. In many rules, the doubles serve as spinners, i.e., they can be played on all four sides, causing the line of play to branch. Sometimes, the first tile is required to be a double, which serves as the only spinner. In some games such as Chicken Foot, all sides of a spinner must be occupied before anybody is allowed to play elsewhere. Matador has unusual rules for matching. Bendomino uses curved tiles, so one side of the line of play (or both) may be blocked for geometrical reasons.

In Mexican Train and other train games, the game starts with a spinner from which various trains branch off. Most trains are owned by a player and in most situations players are allowed to extend only their own train.

=== Scoring ===
In blocking games, scoring happens at the end of the game. After a player has emptied their hand, thereby winning the game for the team, the score consists of the total pip count of the losing team's hands. In some rules, the pip count of the remaining stock is added. If a game is blocked because no player can move, the winner is often determined by adding the pips in players' hands.

In scoring games, each individual can potentially add to the score. For example, in Bergen, players score two points whenever they cause a configuration in which both open ends have the same value and three points if additionally one open end is formed by a double. In Muggins, players score by ensuring the total pip count of the open ends is a multiple of a certain number. In variants of Muggins, the line of play may branch due to spinners. In the common U.S. variant known as Fives players score by making the open ends a multiple of five.

In British public houses and social clubs, a scoring version of "5s-and-3s" is used. The game is normally played in pairs (two against two) and is played as a series of "ends". In each "end", the objective is for players to attach a domino from their hand to one end of those already played so that the sum of the end tiles is divisible by five or three. One point is scored for each time five or three can be divided into the sum of the two tiles, i.e. five at one end and one at the other makes six, which is divisible by three twice, resulting in two points. Double five at one end and five at the other makes 15, which is divisible by three five times (five points) and divisible by five three times (three points) for a total of eight points.

An "end" stops when one of the players is out, i.e., has played all of their tiles. In the event no player is able to empty their hand, then the player with the lowest domino left in hand is deemed to be out and scores one point. A game consists of any number of ends with points scored in the ends accumulating towards a total. The game ends when one of the pair's total score exceeds a set number of points. A running total score is often kept on a cribbage board. 5s-and-3s is played in a number of competitive leagues in the British Isles.

=== Card games using domino sets ===
Apart from the usual blocking and scoring games, games of a very different character are also played with dominoes, such as solitaire or trick-taking games. Most of these are adaptations of card games and were once popular in certain areas to circumvent religious proscriptions against playing cards. A very simple example is a Concentration variant played with a double-six set; two tiles are considered to match if their total pip count is 12.

A popular domino game in Texas is 42. The game is similar to the card game spades. It is played with four players paired into teams. Each player draws seven tiles, and the tiles are played into tricks. Each trick counts as one point, and any domino with a multiple of five dots counts toward the total of the hand. These 35 points of "five count" and seven tricks equals 42 points, hence the name.

== Competitive play ==
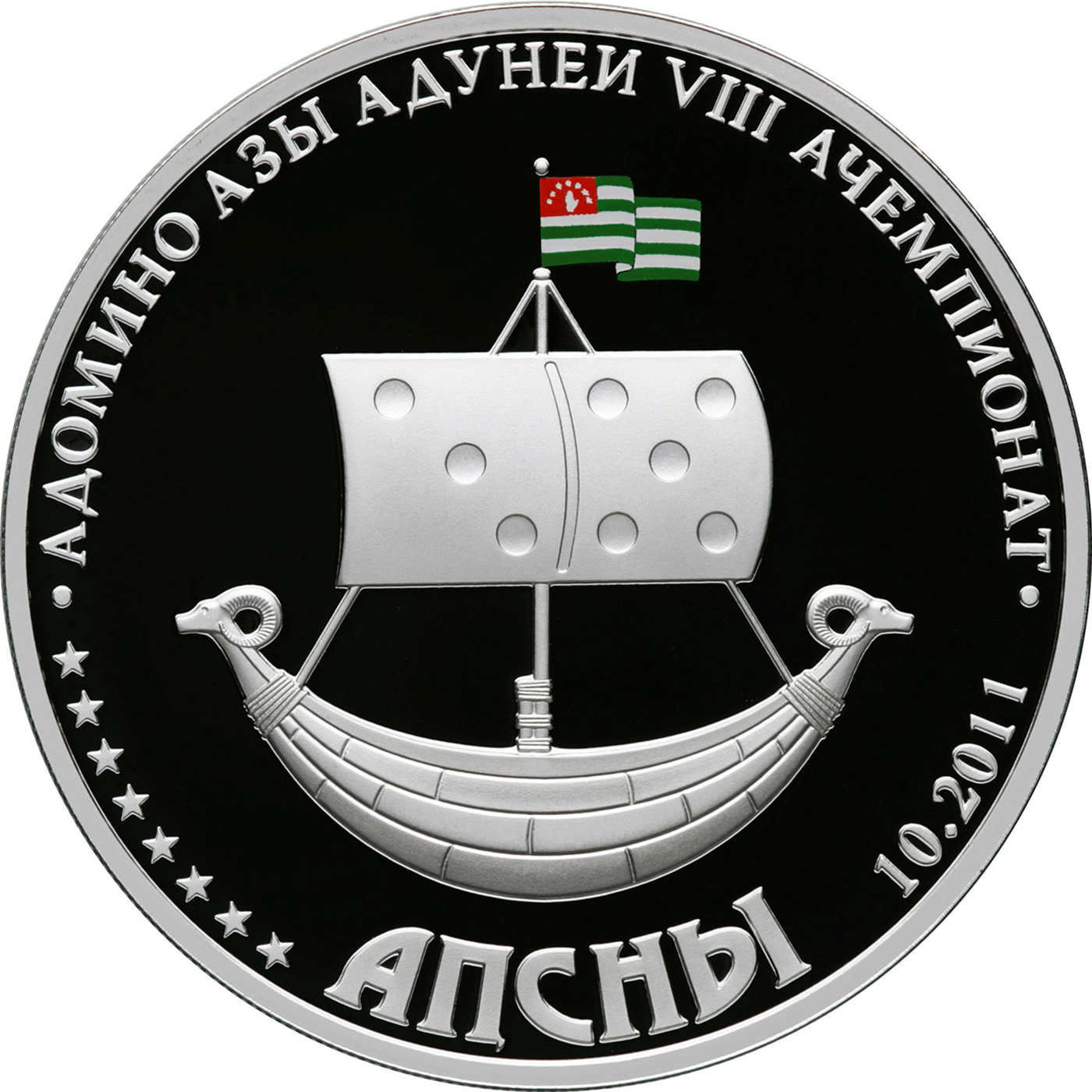
Commemorative Coin of the 2011 Domino World Championship in Abkhazia

Dominoes is played at a professional level, similar to poker. Numerous organisations and clubs of amateur domino players exist around the world. Some organizations organize international competitions. Examples include the Anglo Caribbean Dominoes League (ACDL) in the UK which includes over 40 clubs including the Brixton Immortals.

== Dominoes in Unicode ==
Since April 2008, the character encoding standard Unicode includes characters that represent the double-six domino tiles. While a complete domino set has only 28 tiles, the Unicode set has "reversed" versions of the 21 tiles with different numbers on each end, a "back" image, and everything duplicated as horizontal and vertical orientations, for a total of 100 glyphs. Few fonts are known to support these glyphs.

Domino Tiles^{[1]}^{[2]} Official Unicode Consortium code chart (PDF)
	0	1	2	3	4	5	6	7	8	9	A	B	C	D	E	F
U+1F03x	🀰	🀱	🀲	🀳	🀴	🀵	🀶	🀷	🀸	🀹	🀺	🀻	🀼	🀽	🀾	🀿
U+1F04x	🁀	🁁	🁂	🁃	🁄	🁅	🁆	🁇	🁈	🁉	🁊	🁋	🁌	🁍	🁎	🁏
U+1F05x	🁐	🁑	🁒	🁓	🁔	🁕	🁖	🁗	🁘	🁙	🁚	🁛	🁜	🁝	🁞	🁟
U+1F06x	🁠	🁡	🁢	🁣	🁤	🁥	🁦	🁧	🁨	🁩	🁪	🁫	🁬	🁭	🁮	🁯
U+1F07x	🁰	🁱	🁲	🁳	🁴	🁵	🁶	🁷	🁸	🁹	🁺	🁻	🁼	🁽	🁾	🁿
U+1F08x	🂀	🂁	🂂	🂃	🂄	🂅	🂆	🂇	🂈	🂉	🂊	🂋	🂌	🂍	🂎	🂏
U+1F09x	🂐	🂑	🂒	🂓												
Notes: 1. As of Unicode version 18.0; 2. Grey areas indicate non-assigned code points

== Historical domino competitions ==
- Col. Henry T. Titus vs. Capt. Clark Rice for the naming of Titusville, Florida.

== See also ==
- Domino games
  - Glossary of domino terms
  - List of domino games
  - Chinese dominoes
- Other related articles
  - Domino effect
  - Domino theory
  - Domino's Pizza
  - Domino show/Domino toppling
  - Polyominoes
  - Pub games
  - Tile-based game
  - List of world championships in mind sports

== Sources ==
- Dick, Wm Brisbane (1868). The Modern Pocket Hoyle: Containing All the Games of Skill and Chance as played in this country at the present time (4th ed.). New York: Dick & Fitzgerald.
- Dummett, Michael (1980). The Game of Tarot. Duckworth. ISBN 0715610147.
- How to Play Draughts, Backgammon, Dominoes and Minor Games at Cards. London: Stevens. 1863.
- Hoyle, Edmond (1803). Hoyle's Games, Improved: Consisting of Practical Treatises on Whist ... [etc.] : with an Essay on Game Cocks and the Rules &c. at Horse Races : Wherein are Comprised Calculations for Betting Upon Equal Or Advantageous Terms. R. Baldwin.
- Hoyle, Edmond (1859). Hoyle's Games: Improved and Enlarged by New and Practical Treatises, with the Mathematical Analysis of the Chances of the Most Fashionable Games of the Day, Forming an Easy and Scientific Guide to the Gaming Table, and the Most Popular Sports of the Field. Longman and Company.
- Patrick, David, ed. (1889). Chambers's Encyclopaedia. Edinburgh: Chambers.
- Pickover, Clifford A. (2002). The Zen of Magic Squares, Circles, and Stars. Princeton University Press. ISBN 0-691-11597-4.
- "Richard" (1865). Académie des jeux: contenant la règle de chacun des principaux jeux. Paris: Bernardin-Bechet.
- Sheridan, Thomas (1797). A Complete Dictionary of the English Language. Vol. 1. London: Dilly.
- Strutt, Joseph (1810). Glig-Gamena Angel-Đeod, or, The Sports and Pastimes of the People of England (Second ed.). London.
- "Trumps" (1864). The American Hoyle. New York: Dick & Fitzgerald.
