= Brixton Immortals =

Domino club in Brixton, South London

Coordinates: 51.4630°N 0.1069°W

The Brixton Immortals Domino Club formed in the 1970s, is a team and wider community social club playing Dominoes in Brixton, London, United Kingdom.

With Brixton Blog calling it "Brixton's most successful sport team", it is synonymous with the Brixton Domino Club building, now called the Lloyd Leon Community Centre (LLCC).

== History ==
The club was founded in the 1970s by Lloyd Leon, MBE, (who went on to become Lambeth's first Black mayor) with George Palmer and others from the Caribbean elder community.

The first location was on Acre Lane, then later The Atlantic pub on Coldharbour Lane (where Leon was the then pub landlord) before settling at 297-299 Coldharbour Lane, which is now known as the Lloyd Leon Community Centre.

Dominoes is widely played in Jamaica and the wider Caribbean, so sits strongly in the identity of the London Caribbean diaspora. This leads to the club being frequented by the community's Windrush Generation and the wider Caribbean community. Local MP Helen Hayes commended the club remarking upon the Dominoes game being "an important and fundamental part of the heritage of this area". Although first and foremost a team, the club also acts as a social space and has long been an informal support network and a self help institution.

The 1990s saw the team play in the United Kingdom Domino League. Lord Scarman and Lambeth's mayor were among attendees at the 1990s finals held at Lambeth Town Hall.

The club now takes part in the Anglo Caribbean Dominoes League (ACDL), which it won in 2018. In 2019 the Immortals invited a USA team to the club to play against a UK team made up of players from local clubs.

The current head of the club is Mervin Stewart and it is sponsored by the Victoria Credit Union in Jamaica.

== Club activity and social events ==
The club has held dominoes meetings and tournaments at Lambeth Town Hall since the 1980s as well as Windrush Square in central Brixton. It also regularly holds tournaments as part of Lambeth's Windrush Day celebrations, the borough's Black History Month celebrations, and Jamaica Independence Day. Events have been attended and supported by local politicians Bell Ribero-Addy, Helen Hayes and Sonia Winifred.

In recent years the Ubele organisation has supported the club in building capacity and supporting its management, as well as future planning and refurbishment for the Lloyd Leon Community Centre.

Other domino clubs in the London Borough of Lambeth include UK Diamonds ladies, Clapham Eagles, Clapham Dominoes Club, Myatt Field Park, Bradford, Crawford Foundation, Knight's Hill, The Golden Anchor and the Cosmopolitan Sports and Social Club. The UK Diamonds ladies have a crossover membership with the Immortals, share the same headquarters at the LLCC; they encourage women of all ages to get involved in what has traditionally been seen as a game more popular with men and elders in the community, rather than young women.

The club does frequent outreach events at festivals and teaching dominoes to young people at local schools.

== Lloyd Leon Community Centre ==
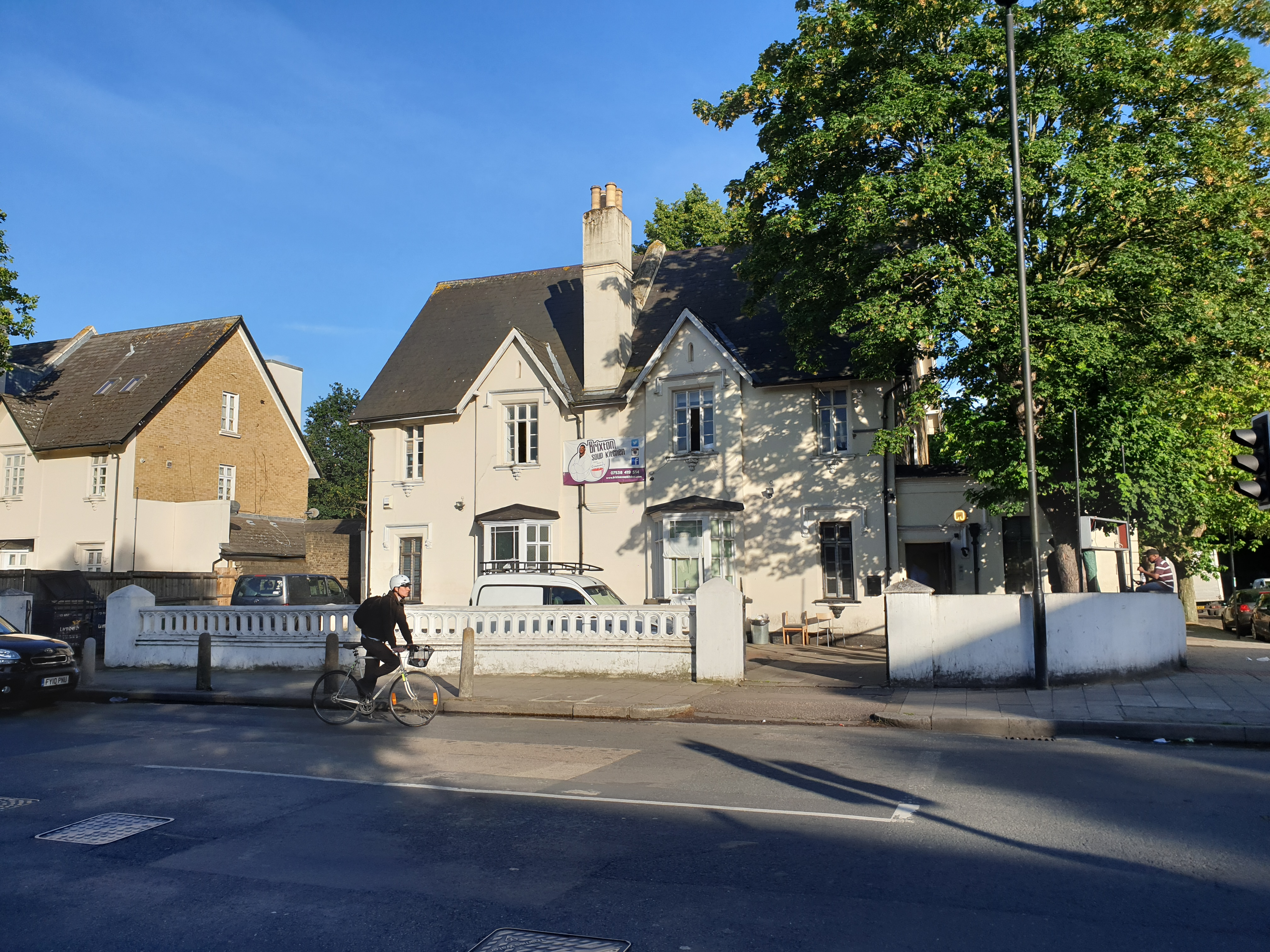
The Immortals' headquarters, Lloyd Leon Community Centre at 297-299 Coldharbour Lane.

The club operates out of the Lloyd Leon Community Centre (LLCC), a Grade II listed building at 297-299 Coldharbour Lane. The building houses the domino clubs, Brixton Soup Kitchen and Lawyers In The Soup Kitchen.

The building, converted from two 19th-century terrace houses, was opened as the Brixton Sports & Social Club and given to the local Black community following recommendations of the Scarman report after the 1981 Brixton Uprising. It was subsequently known as the Domino Club, being renamed the Lloyd Leon Community Centre after the Club's founder in recent years.

As of 2022, the building is currently closed for repairs and refurbishment.
