= Mexican Train =

Domino board game

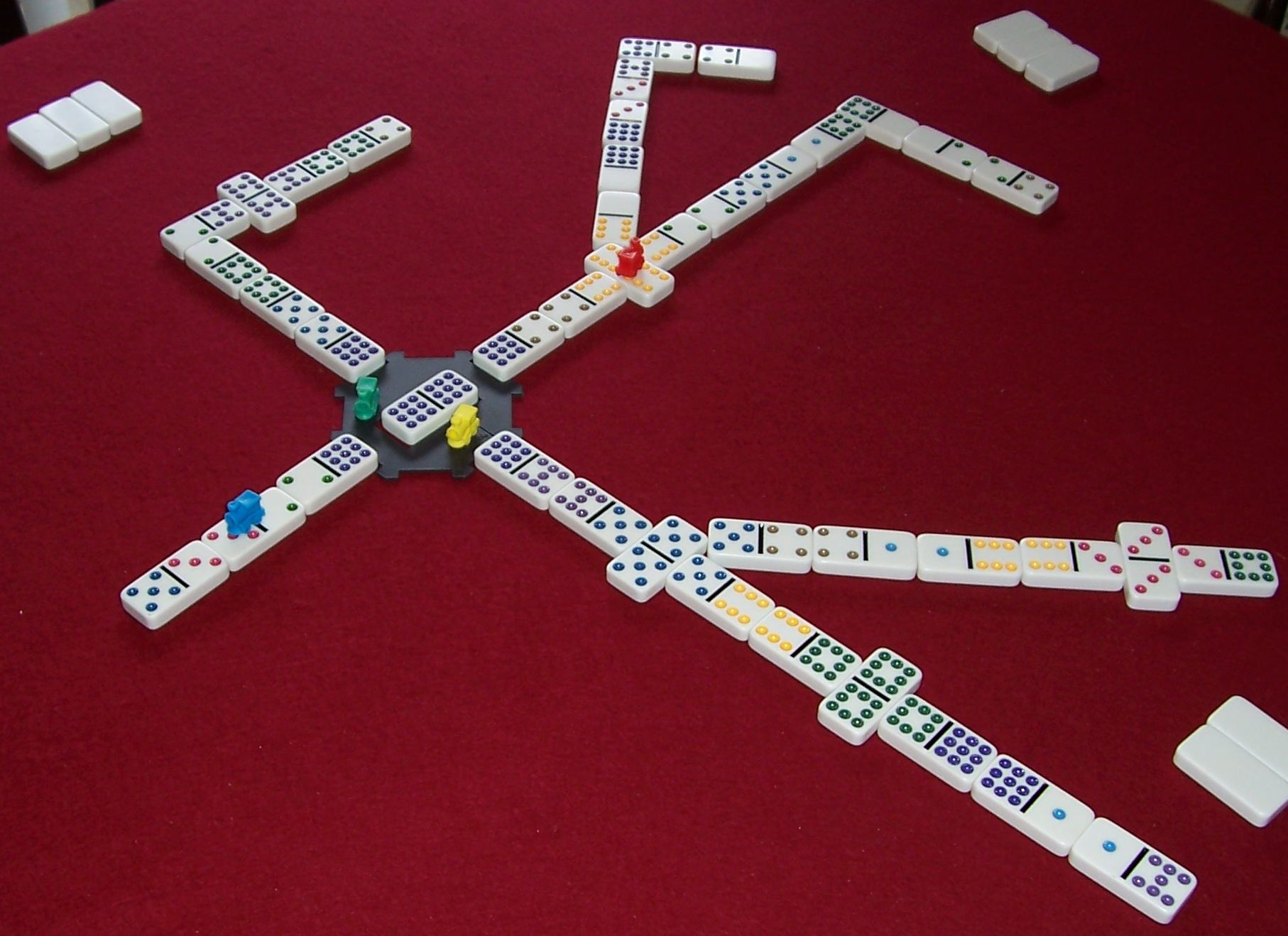
A typical four-player game of Mexican Train using the double-nine set and the branching doubles variation; the eponymous Mexican Train is not in view

Mexican Train is a game played with dominoes. The object of the game is for a player to play all the tiles from their hand onto one or more chains, or trains, emanating from a central hub or "station". The game's most popular name comes from a special optional train that belongs to all players. However, the game can be played without the Mexican train; such variants are generally called "private trains" or "domino trains". It is related to the game Chicken Foot.

== Equipment ==
A double-twelve set of dominoes is marketed as the standard for Mexican Train, and accommodates up to eight players, but there are many sets that are commonly used. The following sets can be used, depending on the number of people playing:

- Double-six (2 players, 28 tiles in total)
- Double-nine (2-7 players, 55 tiles)
- Double-twelve (2-8 players, 91 tiles)
- Double-fifteen (9-12 players, 136 tiles)
- Double-eighteen (13 players, 190 tiles)

Many domino sets use color-coded pips or numerals for the values to help players select matching domino values; however, the color coding scheme may vary from set to set.

In addition to dominoes, the game also uses:

- One token or marker for each player (required)
- Pencil and paper to keep score (required)
- A special spacer, known as the "station" or "hub", used to evenly space the trains around the central domino in radiating spokes (optional)

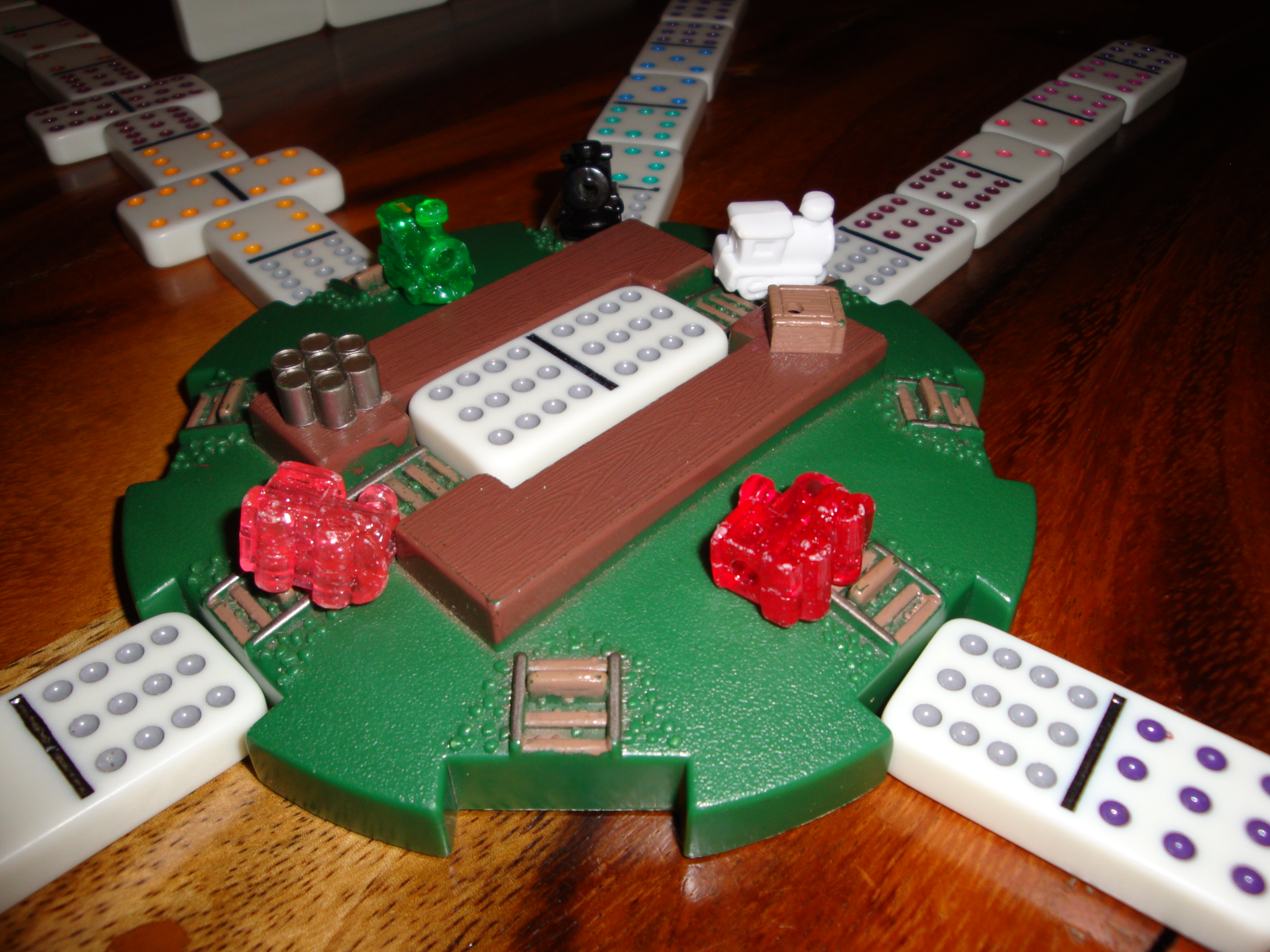
Commercially-produced station hub (pat. Fundex, 2006) with notches for eight spokes (five in use) and train-shaped player markers; the game in progress is using the double-twelve domino as the engine

Many sets of dominoes include a station and special train-shaped tokens for markers, and packaged games with a central "station" and custom tokens are available, along with pads to help keep score. However, the station piece is not strictly needed, and anything from coins to poker chips to even pieces of candy or slips of paper can be used as markers. Because the station or hub usually is designed for eight spokes, the maximum number of players is eight, although additional spokes may be laid in between slots to accommodate more players, using larger domino sets.

== Objective ==
The objective of all train games is to be the first to place all your dominoes. Dominoes may be placed onto the player's train, onto the Mexican train if available, or on the trains of other players under special circumstances. The middle tile counts as the start of a player's multiple tile train.

== Gameplay ==
There are many different rules for Mexican Train, typically with slight variations in gameplay and adjustments according to personal or family custom; the version presented in this article is an amalgamation of rules from Parsons (published by Puremco, 1994), Galt (published by Cardinal, 1994), and Bauguess (rewritten from the 1994 Parsons rules in 2007, revised 2012), using additional rules as needed to check for consensus as there is no single, definitive rule set. Exceptions and variations are noted.

=== Setup and start ===
At the start of each round, the dominoes are placed face-side down, shuffled, and each player draws an equal number to form their hands. The actual number drawn depends on the number of players, domino set in use, and rule variation in use. For example, for a 3-player game using the double-twelve set of 91 dominoes, each player draws 15 tiles for their hand, under the 1994 Galt rules. Dominoes held in a player's hand are kept hidden from the other players.

Number of dominoes per player, drawn for initial hand
| Players Set (tiles) | 2 | 3 | 4 | 5 | 6 | 7 | 8 | 9 | 10 | 11 | 12 | 13 | 14 | Rules |
|---|---|---|---|---|---|---|---|---|---|---|---|---|---|---|
| 2×6 (28) | 5 | | —N/a | | | | | | | | | | | DillyDally |
| 2×6 (28) | 9 | 8 | 6 | —N/a | | | | | | | | | | Glowing Eye Games |
| 2×9 (55) | 7 | | | —N/a | | | | | | | | | | DillyDally |
| 2×9 (55) | 8 | | —N/a | | | | | | | | | | | Mexican Train Fun, 2015 |
| 2×9 (55) | 10 | | | 9 | 7 | | —N/a | | | | | | | (unknown) |
| 2×9 (55) | 12 | 11 | 10 | —N/a | | | | | | | | | | Parsons, 1994 |
| 2×9 (55) | 15 | | 10 | —N/a | | | | | | | | | | Glowing Eye Games |
| 2×9 (55) | 15 | 13 | 10 | —N/a | | | | | | | | | | Bauguess, 2012; RNK, 2020 |
| 2×12 (91) | 16 | | 15 | 14 | 12 | 10 | 9 | —N/a | | | | | | Bauguess, 2012; RNK, 2020 |
| 2×12 (91) | 16 | 15 | 14 | 12 | 11 | 10 | 9 | —N/a | | | | | | University Games, 2014 |
| 2×12 (91) | 15 | | | 12 | | 11 | | —N/a | | | | | | Galt, 1994; DillyDally |
| 2×12 (91) | 15 | | | 12 | | 10 | | —N/a | | | | | | Mique, 2020; Glowing Eye Games |
| 2×12 (91) | 15 | | | 11 | | 8 | | —N/a | | | | | | Fundex, 2003 |
| 2×12 (91) | 12 | | | | | 10 | | —N/a | | | | | | Endless, 2020 |
| 2×12 (91) | —N/a | | 12 | | | 10 | | —N/a | | | | | | Mexican Train Fun, 2015 |
| 2×12 (91) | —N/a | | | 12 | 11 | 10 | 9 | —N/a | | | | | | Parsons, 1994 |
| 2×15 (136) | —N/a | 9 – 13 | | | —N/a | | | | | | | | | DillyDally |
| 2×15 (136) | —N/a | | | | | | | 11 | | | | —N/a | | Mexican Train Fun, 2015 |
| 2×18 (190) | —N/a | | | | | | | | | | | 11 | | Mexican Train Fun, 2015 |
| 2×18 (190) | —N/a | | | | 11 | | | | —N/a | | | | | DillyDally |

Any remaining dominoes are placed to one side, forming the "boneyard". For example, under the 1994 Galt rules, in a 3-player game using the double-twelve set of 91 dominoes, the players collectively hold 45 tiles, leaving 46 tiles in the "boneyard".

=== Opening the station ===
The double-12 domino, customarily used as the engine in the center of the station hub to start the first round.

The highest double tile is set aside before shuffling the tiles and placed to "open the station", starting the game; e.g., with a standard double-twelve set the double twelve is separated before shuffling and placed in the center of the station hub. In each successive round the next lower double is used until all doubles are used. The double-blank is used for the final round; however, players may agree to play fewer rounds in a complete game, especially when sets larger than double-nine are used.

Alternatively, in the 1994 rules written by David Galt, the player who is designated to take the first turn places their highest double in the station to start the game. If the first player does not have a double, the next player opens the station with a double. If no players have a double, each player takes a turn drawing one tile from the boneyard until a double is drawn and used to "open the station".

The player designated to go first should change with each hand. Galt suggests the first player role should rotate so that each player has an equal number of chances to go first. Other rule variants suggest alternative methods to select the first player:

- The first player is selected at random, then rotated clockwise.
- The first player for the first round can be selected by age (oldest or youngest), then rotate clockwise for each following round.
- Each player draws one tile from the boneyard after shuffling. The player who selected the highest total pip count is designated the first player for that round. The drawn tiles are shuffled back into the pile before drawing hands.
- The first player is the one who holds the double-12 domino after drawing hands.

=== Basic rules ===
1. A legal play is made by matching pip values, i.e., the domino being placed is oriented so the pip value on one end of that domino matches the pip value on the free end of a domino which is already on the table.
2. A player may choose to play their domino(es) on their private train, any marked public train, or the Mexican Train, which is a common train which remains public throughout the game.
3. There is no option to pass a turn. When the player holds one or more dominoes that can be played legally, at least one domino must be played from their hand.
4. When the player holds no dominoes which can be played, that player must draw one domino from the boneyard and play it if the drawn domino can be played. If the drawn domino cannot be played, or if the boneyard is empty, that player must designate their private train or the side of the station facing them, if no private train has been started, as public, by placing a marker.
5. After a double domino, i.e., a domino with identical values on both ends, is played legally, that double must be covered by the player who placed it, meaning that player must immediately play another domino legally next to the double. Responsibility to cover the double passes to each player in turn until the double is covered.

=== Opening phase ===
The first player then starts a private train, sometimes known as a personal train, by placing a tile that legally starts from the station by matching pip values to the engine in the station hub, in a direction leading towards their seat. Each player takes a turn, mirroring the first player's first move by playing one tile starting from the station hub in a direction that leads toward their seat.

In other rule variations, during the opening phase, players may start and build their private trains by using as many dominoes as possible from their hand, radiating out from the station hub towards their seats, instead of placing a single domino. Once each player has built these private trains as long as possible, players then start to take turns, placing one or two tiles per turn using their remaining tiles, until one player has emptied their hand, ending the round.

In the 1994 Parsons rules, each player separates their hand into two categories: "personal train" and "extras", with the "personal train" being the longest possible string of end-matching dominoes starting with one that can be laid into the central station hub, and the "extras" being the leftover dominoes that do not fit into the "personal train". With their first move, the first player may choose to start either their "personal train" or the "Mexican Train", using one of the "extras" that has an end matching the "engine" in the station hub.

=== Train building ===
After the initial opening phase, players take turns placing one or two of their remaining tiles legally on any eligible train, which is either their private train, any public train, or the always-public Mexican Train.^{Basic Rule (BR) 2} Two dominoes may be played only when the first domino played is a double.^{BR 5} Play continues from the first player to the left (clockwise). A player may not pass their turn,^{BR 3} as the boneyard-draw rule^{BR 4} or double covering rule^{BR 5} may require that player to designate their train as public.

A train can be as long as the players can make it; it ends only when all dominoes that could match its endpoint have already been played. As a result, trains can become quite long, especially with an extended domino set. It is acceptable to "bend" the train 90° or 180° to keep the train on the playing surface, as long as it does not interfere with the endpoints of other trains.

==== Public and private status ====
During their turn, a player may choose to play a domino on any train currently marked public, regardless of whether it is possible to play on their own private train.^{BR 2}

When a player is unable to place a domino before their turn ends, they must mark their private train as public by placing a marker on their train.^{BR 3,4} After a player legally plays a domino on their marked public train, i.e., the train with their marker, it reverts to being private and may not be played on except by the train's owner, unless it is forced to become public again. To designate when a train is private, the marker may either be removed altogether or moved to the station hub, depending on the rules.

The marker on a public train can only be removed by the marker's owner to make it private, and there is one marker per player. In other words, a player may not hold more than one private train at a time. Only the player whose marker is on a public train can turn the train private by making a valid play on that train and lifting the marker. For example, if Player B places a domino on a public train with Player A's marker, that does not force that train to become private for Player B; when Player A's turn comes, after Player A makes a valid play on that public train, only then will it become private.

If a player is deemed to have made a strategic error the highest score of that round is added to theirs.

==== Mexican Train ====
The Mexican Train is an additional train that remains public throughout the game: anyone may play on this train during their turn. It is metaphorically on a siding, physically represented by disconnecting it from the station hub, in a place convenient to all players. Typically, there is only one Mexican Train per round; rules vary on when it can be started (some say it can be started only after the opening turns are complete, while others are silent) or whether multiple Mexican Trains are allowed.

Any player may start the Mexican Train by playing one domino with an end matching the engine (i.e., the double in the station hub placed at the beginning of the round); subsequent players may add to the train, as long as the domino played matches the free end of the Mexican Train. For example, if the double-9 domino is the engine and the 9-6 domino is played to start the Mexican Train, the next domino to extend the Mexican Train must have one end with a 6.

=== Playing doubles ===
The double-five (🁙) has been played at the end of the private train for Player 1 and then covered by another domino (🂉).

When a double is played, it is placed perpendicular to the train. After a double has been played, the same player is required to play another domino, which is known as finishing, satisfying, answering, closing, or covering the double. The responsibility to cover the double passes to each player if the preceding player is unable to cover it. Each player who is unable to finish the double is required to mark their private train as public, which is consistent with the same basic rules as if that player was unable to make a legal placement on their turn:^{BR 3,4}

- In general, the second (non-double) domino must be played on the double.
- The double may be covered either by a domino already held, or by the domino that is drawn, if no suitable domino is held.
- If the drawn domino is unable to cover the double, that player ends their turn and play passes to the next player, who then becomes responsible to cover the double, again either with a domino already held, or with the domino that is drawn.
- For any player who is unable to cover the double during their turn, that player's private train is marked as public. This includes the private train of the player who initially played the double, if that player could not cover the double, regardless of where the double was played.
- All other trains become ineligible until someone "finishes the double", i.e., normal play may not resume until a domino is played against the double to cover it.
- If it is not possible to cover the double because that double is the last domino with that pip value, it does not need to be covered.

For example, if player A placed the double nine (9-9), player A must cover the double by making a legal play with a second domino (e.g., 9-7) to cover the double, or player A's private train becomes public; the next player (Player B) is then responsible for covering the double, and if player B is unable to cover, their train also becomes public and the responsibility to cover is passed to the following player (Player C). Responsibility to cover the double continues to pass repeatedly in this manner (Players D, E, F, etc.) until one player can cover the double; multiple trains may become public due to the double covering rule.

The playing of doubles and covering requirements are subject to significant variance depending on individual custom and the rules in use, so the basic rules presented here are based on a consensus reading of the different rule sets, biased toward the earliest rules, published in 1994 by Galt and Parsons and updated in 2012 by Bauguess. Refer to the § Double variations section in this article for a more specific description of the differences.

=== Ending and scoring the round ===
The round ends once one player has placed all their dominoes, or when it is not possible to play another domino and the boneyard is empty. One variation suggests that as a courtesy, a player holding only one domino should tap the table to indicate the potential end of the round in the next turn, giving the other players a chance to lower their score by playing their highest-valued domino. Optionally, if a player notices another player who has not announced they are holding only one domino, the latter may be forced to draw two tiles from the boneyard, if it is not empty.

At the end of each round, the player who emptied their hand receives 0 points, while each of the other players receives the sum of all pips (dots) on the dominoes remaining in their hand. The person with the fewest points after all thirteen rounds have been played is the winner.

In the case of a tie, the person with the most 0-point rounds is the winner. If this still results in a tie, the person with the lowest round total other than 0 is the winner.

=== Example ===
Illustrated six-player example gameplay
| Turn | Player (dir.) | Illustration | Trains | | Comments |
| Turn | Player (dir.) | Illustration | Public | Private | Comments |
|---|---|---|---|---|---|
| 0 | —N/a | A double-nine domino is placed in the center of the hub as the "engine" to "open the station". | —N/a | —N/a | In this example, a double-nine is placed in the center of the hub as the "engine" to "open the station". |
| 1 | 1(S) | A 9-7 domino is placed leading south from the station hub, which has a double-9 domino as the engine. | —N/a | S | Player 1 places a 9-7 domino to start their private train, in the direction of their seat. In this example, that direction is south. |
| 2 | 2(SW) | A 9-4 domino is placed leading southwest from the station hub, which has a double-9 domino as the engine. There is already a 9-7 domino leading south from the station hub. | —N/a | S, SW | Player 2 places a 9-4 domino to start their private train, in the direction of their seat. In this example, that direction is southwest. |
| 3 | 3(NW) | A 9-8 domino is placed leading northwest from the station hub, which has a double-9 domino as the engine. There is already a 9-7 domino leading south, and a 9-4 domino leading southwest from the station hub. | —N/a | S, SW, NW | Player 3 places a 9-8 domino to start their private train, in the direction of their seat. In this example, that direction is northwest. |
| 4 | 4(N) | A 9-3 domino is placed leading north from the station hub, which has a double-9 domino as the engine. There is already a 9-7 domino leading south, a 9-4 domino leading southwest, and a 9-8 domino leading northwest from the station hub. | —N/a | S, SW, NW, N | Player 4 places a 9-3 domino to start their private train, in the direction of their seat. In this example, that direction is north. |
| 5 | 5(NE) | A 9-6 domino is placed leading northeast from the station hub, which has a double-9 domino as the engine. There is already a 9-7 domino leading south, a 9-4 domino leading southwest, a 9-8 domino leading northwest, and a 9-3 domino leading north from the station hub. | —N/a | S, SW, NW, N, NE | Player 5 places a 9-6 domino to start their private train, in the direction of their seat. In this example, that direction is northeast. |
| Turn | Player (dir.) | Illustration | Trains | | Comments |
| Turn | Player (dir.) | Illustration | Public | Private | Comments |
| 6 | 6(SE) | A 9-1 domino is placed leading southeast from the station hub, which has a double-9 domino as the engine. There is already a 9-7 domino leading south, a 9-4 domino leading southwest, a 9-8 domino leading northwest, a 9-3 domino leading north, and a 9-6 domino leading northeast from the station hub. | —N/a | S, SW, NW, N, NE, SE | Player 6 places a 9-1 domino to start their private train, in the direction of their seat. In this example, that direction is southeast. All six private trains have been started at this point. |
| 7 | 1(S) | A 7-5 domino is placed leading south, matching the free end of the 9-7 domino in the station hub. | —N/a | S, SW, NW, N, NE, SE | Player 1 places a 7-5 domino to continue their private train south. |
| 8 | 2(SW) | A 4-6 domino is placed leading southwest, matching the free end of the 9-4 domino in the station hub. | —N/a | S, SW, NW, N, NE, SE | Player 2 places a 4-6 domino to continue their private train southwest. |
| 9 | 3(NW) | A 8-0 domino is placed leading northwest, matching the free end of the 9-8 domino in the station hub. | —N/a | S, SW, NW, N, NE, SE | Player 3 places an 8-0 domino to continue their private train northwest. |
| 10 | 4(N) | A 3-2 domino is placed leading north, matching the free end of the 9-3 domino in the station hub. | —N/a | S, SW, NW, N, NE, SE | Player 4 places a 3-2 domino to continue their private train north. |
| Turn | Player (dir.) | Illustration | Trains | | Comments |
| Turn | Player (dir.) | Illustration | Public | Private | Comments |
| 11 | 5(NE) | A 6-3 domino is placed leading northeast, matching the free end of the 9-6 domino in the station hub. | —N/a | S, SW, NW, N, NE, SE | Player 5 places a 6-3 domino to continue their private train northeast. |
| 12 | 6(SE) | A 1-5 domino is placed leading southeast, matching the free end of the 9-1 domino in the station hub. | —N/a | S, SW, NW, N, NE, SE | Player 6 places a 1-5 domino to continue their private train southeast. |
| 13 | 1(S) | A double-five domino is placed crosswise to the south-leading train, matching the free end of the 7-5 domino. | —N/a | S, SW, NW, N, NE, SE | Player 1 places a double-five domino, crosswise, to continue their private train south ... |
| 13 | 1(S) | A 5-3 domino is placed to cover the double-five domino previously played. | —N/a | S, SW, NW, N, NE, SE | ... then follows up by playing the 5-3 domino to "cover the double". Since the double was covered, the (S) train remains private. |
| 14 | 2(SW) | A double-six domino is placed crosswise to the southwest-leading train, matching the free end of the 4-6 domino. | —N/a | S, SW, NW, N, NE, SE | Player 2 places a double-six domino, crosswise, to continue their private train southeast ... |
| 14 | 2(SW) | The marker for Player 2 is moved to the double-six domino that just was played, indicating this (SW) train is now public. | SW | S, ~~SW~~, NW, N, NE, SE | ... but is unable to "cover" the double-six, and as a result, is forced to mark their train as public by moving their marker to that train. Responsibility to cover the double passes to Player 3. |
| 15 | 3(NW) | The marker for Player 3 is moved their private train, indicating this (NW) train is now public. Generally, the marker is placed on the last domino with a free end. | SW, NW | S, ~~SW~~, ~~NW~~, N, NE, SE | Player 3 also is unable to cover the double, and likewise is forced to mark their train as public by moving their marker to that train. Note that even if Player 3 has a domino that could be played on their formerly private (NW) train, they cannot because the double-six on the (SW) train must be covered before any other trains are eligible for play. |
| Turn | Player (dir.) | Illustration | Trains | | Comments |
| Turn | Player (dir.) | Illustration | Public | Private | Comments |
| 16 | 4(N) | A 6-2 domino is placed against the double-six of the SW train, indicating the double is now covered. | SW, NW | S, ~~SW~~, ~~NW~~, N, NE, SE | Player 4 covers the double-six with the 6-2 domino. Because it was covered by Player 4 and not Player 2, the (SW) train remains public; it can only be taken private by Player 2 when their turn comes, and only after Player 2 makes a valid play on the end of the public (SW) train. Before Player 2's turn, another player may place a domino on the free end (with a pip value of 2) of the public (SW) train, so Player 2 will not know if they can take the train private again until after Player 1's next turn. |
| 17 | 5(NE) | A double-nine domino is placed in the center of the hub as the "engine" to "open the station". | SW, NW | S, ~~SW~~, ~~NW~~, N, NE, SE | Player 5 chooses to play on the public (NW) train with a 0-9 domino, potentially disrupting Player 3's planned continuation of their formerly private train, as there are only a few dominoes left with a pip value of 9 on one end. The other trains on which Player 5 is eligible to play are their private (NE) train, the other public (SW) train, or the Mexican Train (not pictured). This is possible only because Player 4 covered the double in the last turn; if Player 4 had failed to cover, the (N) train would have been marked public and responsibility to cover the double-six on the (SW) train would have continued to Player 5. |

== Elements of strategy ==
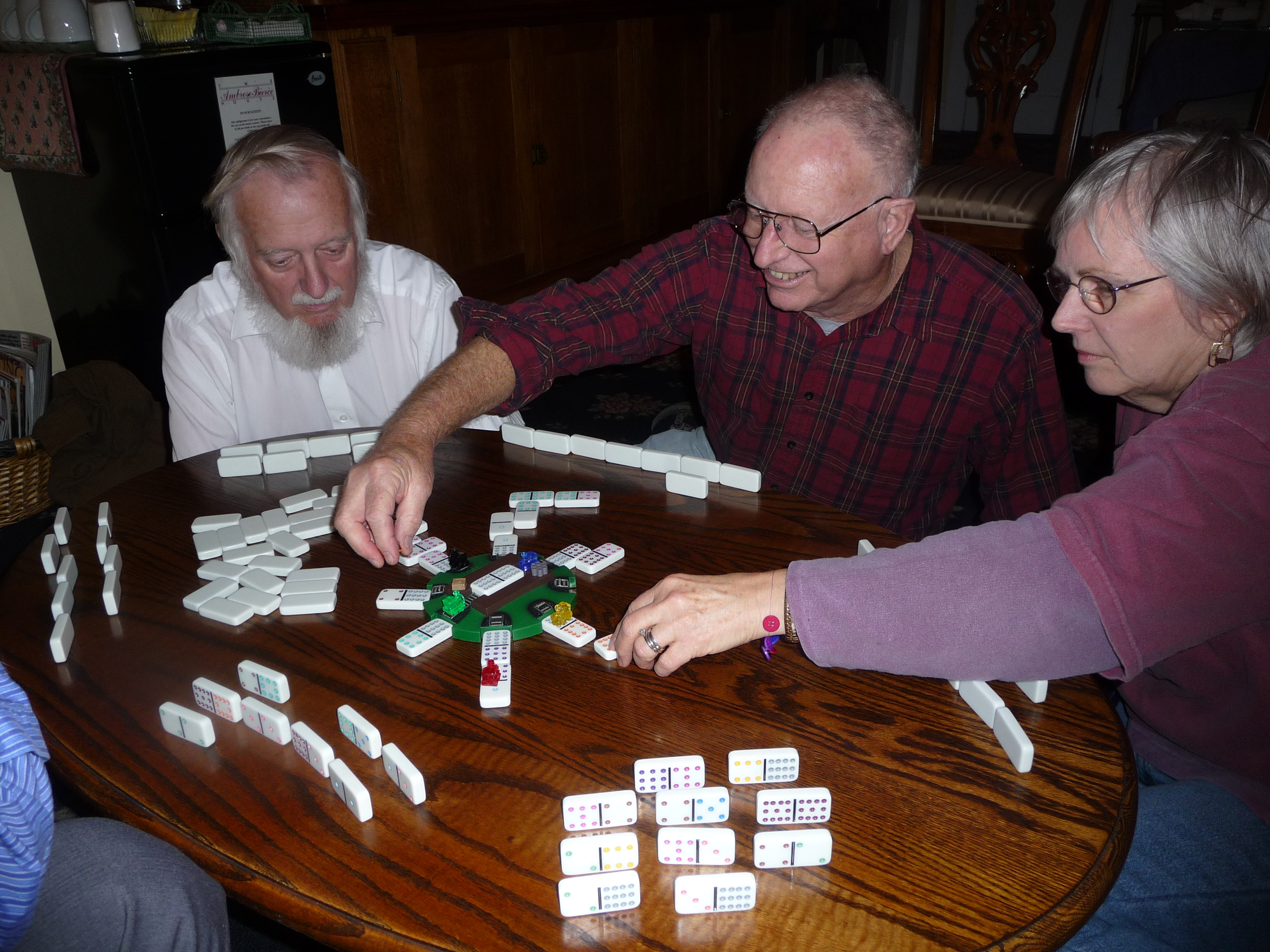
Six people playing Mexican Train using double-twelve dominoes

- It is generally in a player's best interest to keep their train private. By making a train public, the player allows other players to break an impasse in extending the train, but the player loses all other options except to attempt to play on the endpoint of their own train.
- While public trains offer additional options, the player's own private train should be considered first. Trains are usually public because their owners cannot play on them; if that train's endpoint does not change, its owner has no options until they draw a domino they can play on it.
- A player may choose to dump unmatched tiles on public trains first, before starting their own train, to trick the other players into believing that the player cannot start a train.
- If one or more players played on a public train and the endpoint value has changed, play another tile that will change the endpoint value back to its original value or to a value the player is thought not to have.
- Players must always play if they have an eligible tile. They cannot at any time hold back and pass and/or draw for some strategic reason.
- Because a player playing an unfinished double on someone else's train does not have to mark their own train as public, it is recommended that players play doubles on public trains whenever possible. Not only does this remove a major disadvantage to playing an unfinished double, it does not change the endpoint value of the train meaning its owner probably will not be able to play, and other players do have to mark their trains if they cannot finish the double.

== Variations ==
There are a number of other versions of the rules for Mexican Train, varying the number of dominoes drawn by each player, the rules for playing doubles, or the number of tiles that can be played during one turn. For example:

=== Partnerships ===
With four, six or eight players, the game can be played in teams of two, with partners sitting opposite each other. Rules are identical except that a player's train and their partner's train are considered to be a single train, as they will usually extend from opposite sides of the station, and thus a player can play on their own end or their partner's, and neither end becomes public until neither partner can play a tile. Scoring is also handled in pairs, with the player who went out scoring zero for their team (even though their partner will have dominoes remaining) and other teams summing their scores for a team score.

=== Faster pace ===
==== Fast game ====
After the starting double has been placed, during the opening phase, each player simultaneously starts and extends their private train, using as many dominoes in their hand as possible. Once everyone has finished this initial private train building phase, play reverts to turns, using the rules listed above. This speeds up the game, but eliminates some of the strategies resulting from the requirement to cover doubles.

==== Delayed first turn ====
Similar to the fast game variation listed above, instead of simultaneously, each person takes turns playing as many dominoes on their train as possible. Any player that is unable to play on their first turn draws a domino, and may then begin their first turn or pass. When a player who has passed finally starts their train, they may play as many dominoes as they can string together. After starting their train, players are only permitted to play one domino at a time as usual, unless playing a double. This version allows a player to save their "first turn" string of dominoes for when they have a chance, instead of being stuck with all dominoes from the beginning.

==== Swan drive ====
A player who can play on their own train may also play one tile on each subsequent public train in clockwise order. Each public train must be played on in order to continue in this manner, and only one tile per train may be played (unless a double must be finished). Once a player cannot play on the next public train, or has looped around to their own train, their turn ends. While playing on each public train, the player may choose to play on the Mexican train or skip it when he comes to it, making the placement of the train somewhat strategical. This version makes for a much faster game.

==== Bullet Train ====
As the name implies this makes the game move faster.

During a players turn if they are able to finish out their hand by playing all of their remaining dominoes on their private train, they can declare a "Bullet Train". Once the Bullet Train is verified, the other players finish out their private train by playing as many of their remaining dominoes as possible.

=== Double variations ===
==== Cover optional ====
Some rules state that covering the double is optional altogether, although most rules require covering the double.

==== Any train can cover ====
In other rules, the second (covering) domino may go on any eligible train instead of the double itself, but at least one set of rules restricts this only to the player who placed the double; following players must play against the double. When this variation is used, for example, a player could play a double on a public train, then "cover" it by playing another domino on their private train; the following player(s) are then responsible to play against the double on the public train.

==== Branching doubles ====
Once a double has been satisfied, players may continue to branch off of the double in two more directions, meaning the double will have a matching endpoint on all four sides, similar to Chicken Foot. Often, players like to angle these branches at a 45-degree angle to accommodate for more room. This variant gives players more choice and speeds up the game.

In at least one variation, each double is required to be covered by three branching dominoes before normal play can resume, i.e., three different players are required to fully cover the double. However, after the first covering domino has been played, it is not required to mark trains as public if the player is unable to cover the second or third branch.

==== Multiple doubles ====
Under this variation, a player may place multiple doubles during a single turn as long as the trains are eligible and the placement is legal; that player is required to cover only the first double played, and the next player is responsible for covering the second double, etc.; all doubles must be covered before normal play may resume. However, an earlier version of these rules states that only two doubles may be played in a single turn, and the covering domino for one of the doubles must be one already held; it may not be drawn.

==== Double public ====
The train on which the double was played becomes public, if it was private before the double was played, or it remains public.

==== Exceptions ====
In several rule variations, including the 1994 rules written by Galt, there are three exceptions to the double-covering requirement:

1. The double that was played is the last unplaced domino with that pip value (there are no possible dominoes that can be played to cover)
2. The double was played to return a public train back to private, removing that player's marker
3. The double was the last domino played out of that player's hand, ending the train and the round; however, some rules explicitly prohibit the player from placing a double as the last domino, requiring that it be covered instead.

==== Continuous draw ====
In one set of rules, if no player is able to cover the double after each player has had a chance to do so, the player who placed the double is required to draw continuously from the boneyard into their hand until a covering domino is found. For example, in a four-player game, if Player A placed a double, and all four players were unable to cover it, then during Player A's subsequent turn, they would be forced to draw until they can cover the double.

=== Blanks ===
Blank ends (no pips) are sometimes considered wild cards.

Blanks typically score zero points, but each blank could be scored as 25 points, with the double blank domino scoring 50 points.

== History ==
Mexican Train is a name typically used only in the United States. It is believed that American games using dominoes are descended from the Chinese game Pai gow, which means "make nine" and uses a variant of the double-six domino set, with some duplicated dominoes and omitting the blank values; however, the European double-six domino set was developed, possibly independently, around the start of the 18th century, in Italy. Chinese laborers may have brought Pai gow to Latin America after they began working in sugar fields in the mid to late 1800s.

Cubans and other Latin American players adopted the game's equipment for other games, including Longana, also known as Dominó Cubano in Mexico, which is not to be confused with Cuban Dominoes. Longana is a four-player game using a double-nine set; like Mexican Train it also calls for a double domino to start in the center of a cruciform layout and uses the same public / private switching system upon passing a turn; the primary differences in Longana are a double may be played on any chain, there is no common, always-public train, and the winner of each round receives a score equal to the sum of all the remaining dominoes in the other players' hands. The Cuban game is depicted in the film Buena Vista Social Club. It later arrived in the United States around the 1860s once Cuban laborers began working on U.S. railroads. Americans began referring to the game as "Mexican Train Dominoes" because of its growing popularity among Cuban, Mexican, and other Latin American laborers brought to the United States.

Roy and Katie Parsons developed and copyrighted rules for Train in 1994, and sold production rights to Puremco, who marketed the game as Mexican Train, packaging a double twelve domino set with rules for eight games. A trademark application was filed for the name Cardinal Mexican Train by a competitor, Cardinal Industries, in 1994, but the application was dismissed and abandoned in 1996. A subsequent trademark application for just "Mexican Train" was filed in 2017 and also was dismissed and abandoned.

== See also ==
- Chicken foot (game)
