= Black Equity Organisation =

Civil rights organisation in the UK

- Abbreviation: BEO
- Formation: 2022; 4 years ago
- Type: Charitable incorporated organisation (CIO)
- Registration no.: 1195506
- Purpose: Anti-racism, representing the Black British community
- Headquarters: 86–90 Paul Street, London EC2A 4NE
- Region served: United Kingdom
- Chair: Vivian Hunt
- Chief Executive: Timi Okuwa
- Revenue: £579,180 (to 31 March 2022)
- Expenses: £435,580 (to 31 March 2022)
- Funding: Donations and legacies
- Website: blackequityorg.com

The Black Equity Organisation (BEO) is a civil rights organisation and anti-racism charity in the United Kingdom, launched in 2022 with the aim of dismantling systemic racism.

== Background ==
The organisation was registered as a charitable incorporated organisation (CIO) on 12 September 2021. Co-founded by prominent black Britons including Vivian Hunt, David Lammy and David Olusoga, it was officially announced as a first-of-its-kind civil rights group for the UK in 2022, two years after the George Floyd protests in the United Kingdom which resulted in the removal of statues across the UK of figures associated with the transatlantic slave trade.

The organisation is intended to serve a similar purpose to the NAACP in the United States, with the aim of dismantling systemic racism in British society.

== Activity ==
In May 2022 the BEO set up an "access to justice hotline" to provide legal advice and representation for racism-related issues, and to provide other support for black families by guiding them to helpful resources. The organisation helped find a lawyer for the family of an 11-year-old black schoolboy in Wales who lost a finger when his hand was maimed while attempting to escape racist bullies.

A report commissioned by the Black Equity Organisation in September 2022 found that a majority of black people in the UK face discrimination from healthcare staff. It found that 65% of survey respondents had been discriminated against by healthcare professionals due to their ethnicity. It also found that the concerns of black women are more likely to be dismissed by practitioners due to a stereotype of "strong black women". It further concluded that 60% of black respondents did not see the changes needed to address these issues being implemented by the institutions in question.

In April 2023 the organisation launched legal action against Home Secretary Suella Braverman after she abandoned key reforms recommended by the inquiry into the Windrush scandal. The proposed reforms involved increasing the level of independent scrutiny of Home Office migration policies, and a further promise of reconciliation events with families of the scandal's victims. A petition with over 50,000 signatories urged the Home Secretary to reconsider, and the BEO sought a judicial review of the Home Secretary's decision. The BEO's Chief Executive Dr Wanda Wyporska called for the Home Office to be stripped of its responsibility for the compensation scheme set up for Windrush victims.

== Funding ==
The organisation does not actively raise funds from the public, and instead relies on donations and legacies (donations left in someone's will). In the financial period ending 31 March 2022, the organisation had a total income of £579,180 and a total expenditure of £435,575, with £143,610 retained for future use.

In May 2022, 6 multinational law firms including Herbert Smith Freehills, Allen & Overy, Ashurst LLP, Clifford Chance, Freshfields Bruckhaus Deringer, and Slaughter and May collaborated to support the launch of the Black Equity Organisation by providing strategic, financial and advisory support to combat racism in the UK.

In June 2022, Sky Group announced a £1 million partnership with the BEO for the Future 100 Growth Fund, which provides backing for black British entrepreneurs to launch and grow their businesses. Between 2009 and 2019, only 0.24% of venture capital funding invested in startups in the UK went to black entrepreneurs, with only 0.02% going to black female entrepreneurs. Sky Group pledged a total of £30 million to combat structural inequality and to help those affected by racism. The programme is open to black UK residents between 18 and 30.

== Trustees ==
As of 26 August 2023 the board of trustees includes:

- Vivian Hunt, consultant and Chair of trustees
- Adjoa Andoh, actress
- Siobhan Aarons, co-founder of Conservatives Against Racism For Equality (CARFE)
- Athian Akec, historian and writer
- David Olusoga, historian and professor
- Michelle Daley, disability justice activist
- Yvonne Field, founder and CEO of The Ubele Initiative
- Marcia Willis Stewart, King's Counsel
- Mark Boisson, accountant and treasurer of Hackney Foodbank
- Richard Lewis, businessman
- Kwame Kwei-Armah, actor and Young Vic artistic director
- David Lammy, politician
- Karen Blackett, Chancellor of the University of Portsmouth

== See also ==
- Racism in the United Kingdom
- Black Lives Matter movement in the United Kingdom
- Forever Family, a grassroots anti-racism and black power group in the UK
