= Domino Tiles =

Unicode character block

- Range: U+1F030..U+1F09F (112 code points)
- Plane: SMP
- Scripts: Common
- Symbol sets: Domino tile symbols
- Assigned: 100 code points
- Unused: 12 reserved code points

Unicode version history
- 5.1 (2008): 100 (+100)

Unicode documentation
- Code chart ∣ Web page

Domino Tiles is a Unicode block containing characters for representing game situations in dominoes. The block includes symbols for the standard six dot tile set and backs in horizontal and vertical orientations.

Domino Tiles^{[1]}^{[2]} Official Unicode Consortium code chart (PDF)
	0	1	2	3	4	5	6	7	8	9	A	B	C	D	E	F
U+1F03x	🀰	🀱	🀲	🀳	🀴	🀵	🀶	🀷	🀸	🀹	🀺	🀻	🀼	🀽	🀾	🀿
U+1F04x	🁀	🁁	🁂	🁃	🁄	🁅	🁆	🁇	🁈	🁉	🁊	🁋	🁌	🁍	🁎	🁏
U+1F05x	🁐	🁑	🁒	🁓	🁔	🁕	🁖	🁗	🁘	🁙	🁚	🁛	🁜	🁝	🁞	🁟
U+1F06x	🁠	🁡	🁢	🁣	🁤	🁥	🁦	🁧	🁨	🁩	🁪	🁫	🁬	🁭	🁮	🁯
U+1F07x	🁰	🁱	🁲	🁳	🁴	🁵	🁶	🁷	🁸	🁹	🁺	🁻	🁼	🁽	🁾	🁿
U+1F08x	🂀	🂁	🂂	🂃	🂄	🂅	🂆	🂇	🂈	🂉	🂊	🂋	🂌	🂍	🂎	🂏
U+1F09x	🂐	🂑	🂒	🂓												
Notes: 1. As of Unicode version 16.0; 2. Grey areas indicate non-assigned code points

== History ==
The following Unicode-related documents record the purpose and process of defining specific characters in the Domino Tiles block:

Version	Final code points (Note: Proposed code points and characters names may differ from final code points and names)	Count	L2 ID	WG2 ID	Document
5.1	U+1F030..1F093	100	L2/04-163	N2760	Everson, Michael (2004-05-18), Proposal to encode dominoes and other game symbols in the UCS
5.1	U+1F030..1F093	100	L2/06-288		Pentzlin, Karl (2006-08-06), Comments on L2/04-163 - Domino tiles and other game symbols
5.1	U+1F030..1F093	100	L2/06-306	N3147	Everson, Michael (2006-09-12), Proposal to encode Mahjong, Domino, and Draughts symbols in the UCS
5.1	U+1F030..1F093	100	L2/07-171	N3171	Chen, Zhuang; Everson, Michael; Lu, Qin; Sekiguchi, Masuhiro; Shih-Shyeng, Tseng; Wei, Lin-Mei; West, Andrew (2006-09-27), Proposal to encode Mahjong, Domino, and Draughts symbols in the UCS
5.1	U+1F030..1F093	100		N3153 (pdf, doc)	Umamaheswaran, V. S. (2007-02-16), "M49.14", Unconfirmed minutes of WG 2 meeting 49 AIST, Akihabara, Tokyo, Japan; 2006-09-25/29
