= Matador (domino game) =

Domino game

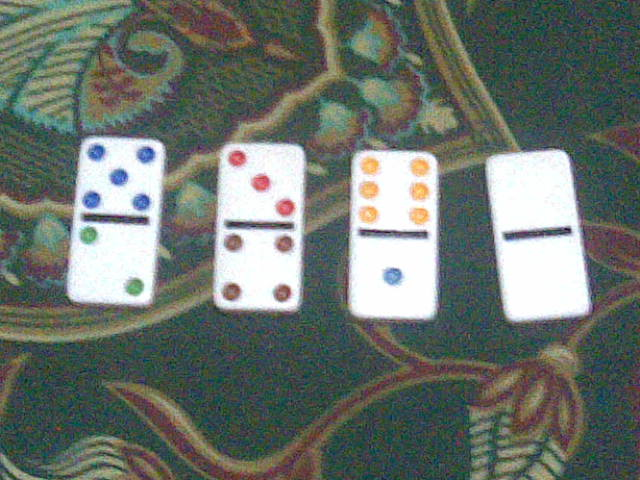
The dominoes used as "matadors". Note that each tile, except the double-zero (🁣), has seven pips.

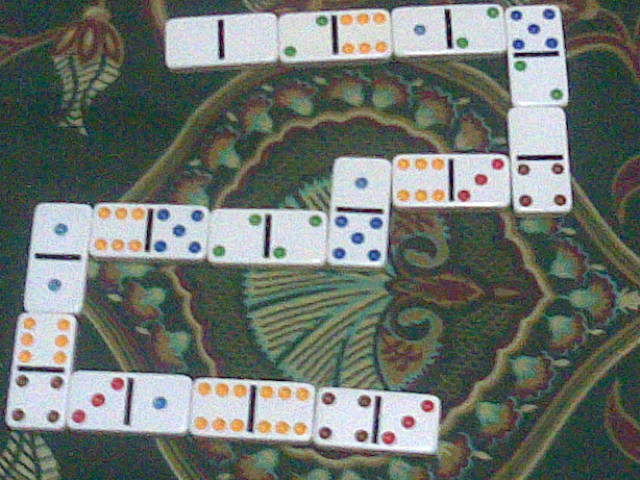
The game of Matador in progress. Note the "matadors": 4-3 (🁐) is placed beside double-six (🁡), 5-2 (🂈) against 0-4 (🁧), and double-zero (🀱) against 2-6 (🁅). Also notice the doubles placed parallel rather than perpendicular to the domino line.

Matador (Spanish, "killer" or "bullfighter") or Matadore, sometimes called Russian Dominoes, is a domino game for two to four players using a double six set of dominoes. It is one of the blocking family of domino games in which the object of the game is to be the first to go out, while blocking one's opponents from doing so. Its distinguishing feature is the unusual rule of playing tiles so as to combine pips instead of matching numbers.

== Number of dominoes ==
After it is decided who goes first, usually the player who picks the highest double (a domino with both ends showing the same number of spots), each player gets five tiles, with the leftover ones set aside in an area known as the boneyard.

== Connections ==
During play, players must connect either end of the line of tiles not with a matching number on either end, but one causing the two connecting ends to have a total of seven pips, i. e. a six-spot end must be connected with a one-spot one, a four-spot with a three-spot, and a two-spot with a five-spot. Doubles are placed endwise and count the same as single dominoes. Blanks are closed to play for any domino other than a "matador". A "matador" can be either the double-zero (🀱) domino or one containing a total of seven pips (4-3 🁐, 5-2 🁖, and 6-1 🁜). A player can also place a "matador" at any time without any regard to the numbers at either end of the domino line.

When a player does not have a domino that connects with either end of the domino line, the player must pick a domino from the boneyard and see if this is playable. If it is, the domino must be played; otherwise one must pick another domino repeatedly until a playable one turns up. If the boneyard is empty, i.e. all dominoes have been taken, the player must signify that he passes his turn, usually by knocking. There is also a rule set that says that when a player has no playable domino and picks up an unplayable domino from the boneyard, the player must pass immediately.

== Win ==
As usual, the player who has set all their tiles to the tableau wins the game. If all players pass their turn once in succession, the game ends and the player with the lowest number of pips on their leftover tiles wins.

== See also ==
- Glossary of domino terms

== Bibliography ==
- Brandreth, Gyles Daubeney (1981). Everyman's indoor games. London: J.M. Dent. OCLC 1244726791.
