= Vivian Hunt =

Business executive

Dame Vivian Hunt DBE
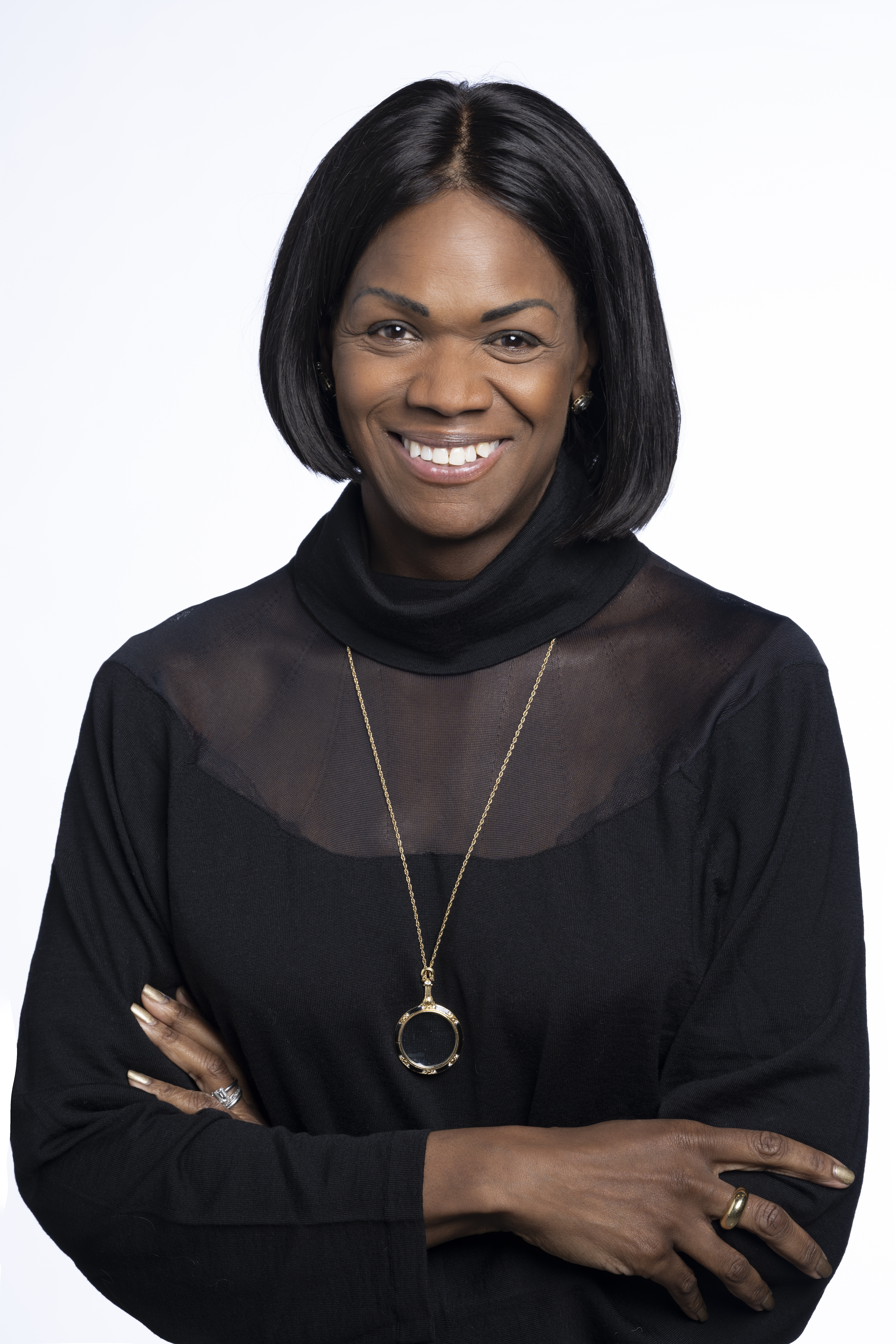
- Headshot of Dame Vivian Hunt in 2022
- Born: Vivian Yvonne Hunt; July 1967 (age 58–59); Cleveland, Ohio
- Education: Harvard College; Harvard Business School
- Occupation: Business Executive
- Board member of: Harvard Board of Overseers, Teach First, Black Equity Organisation, The British Museum, The Southbank Centre
- Spouse: Nicholas Basden

Dame Vivian Yvonne Hunt DBE (born July 1967) is a business executive.

== Early life and education ==
Vivian Hunt was born in Cleveland, Ohio and has two brothers. During her childhood, she and her family lived in the United States of America and in Japan. She attended the Concord Academy in Massachusetts and graduated in 1985. After college, she joined the Peace Corps where she worked in Senegal as a regional supervisor in a primary care and midwifery practice (1989–91).

== Career ==
=== McKinsey & Company ===
In 1995, Hunt joined consulting firm McKinsey & Company's Boston office before transferring to the United Kingdom and Ireland office. Hunt was appointed Managing Partner of the UK and Ireland offices in 2013 and served in that role for seven years. Previously, she led the company's Life Sciences EMEA division for eight years. Hunt also served on McKinsey's global Board of Directors, Professional Standards, Finance and several personnel committees.

=== Multistakeholder capitalism and business research ===
Hunt strongly advocates for stakeholder capitalism. This includes an evidence-based approach to identify and eliminate bias and improve performance in business.

Hunt delivered a TEDTalk on How businesses can serve everyone, not just shareholders, which received over 1.5 million views. She has discussed the importance of a sustainable, inclusive approach to capitalism.

Hunt is a founding co-author of McKinsey's four Diversity Matters publications that found diversity and inclusion are correlated with higher financial performance. She also co-authored ESG articles How to make ESG real and Does ESG really matter--and why? She co-authored the first Women in the Workplace report, the largest comprehensive study of the state of women in corporate America, and How advancing women's equality can add $12 trillion to global growth. The insights and methodologies have been applied globally.

In 2018, she was criticised by The Times when Gender Pay Gap reporting revealed that McKinsey & Company paid its women employees salaries that were 24% less than male employees and bonuses that were 76% lower than men despite Hunt having received her DBE for services to women in business. McKinsey clarified that it paid men and women in equivalent roles the same amount, but that it had a disproportionately high number of men in senior roles.

=== Board, government and nonprofit experience ===
In April 2024, Hunt and Tyler Jacks were elected senior officers of the Harvard Board of Overseers for academic year 2024-25. As a Harvard Overseer, Hunt co-chairs the governing boards’ joint committee on alumni affairs and development and serves on a diverse array of board and academic visiting committees, including those for Harvard’s Business School, the Graduate School of Education, and the Art and Peabody Museums.

Hunt is a co-founder and the Chair of the Black Equity Organisation, an independent black civil rights organisation "created to dismantle systemic racism in Britain." In this role, Hunt has advocated on issues affecting black Britons, through programmes such as Shaping the Future of Black Britain. She participated in a conversation with 5 News on the presence of racism in a wide range of areas, including health care, education and the criminal justice system.

She is a founding member and Chair of Generation UK, a non-profit that trains people with few academic qualifications, social or economic disadvantages and provides intensive technology and analytics training. This is a skills-based collaboration with companies and governments to place qualified people into jobs.

Hunt also served on the US-UK Fulbright Commission and the University of Oxford Said Business School Business Leadership Council amongst other UK governmental bodies.

Since 2019, she has been Chair of Teach First.

== Personal life ==
She is married to Nicholas Basden. The couple has two sons. She is a British and American citizen.

== Honours ==
Hunt was made a Dame Commander of the Most Excellent Order of the British Empire in Queen Elizabeth's 2018 New Year Honours for "services to the economy and to women in business". In 2019, she received the Chartered Management Institute's Gold Medal Award and Business in the Community's National Gender Champion Award. In 2022, she received the Strategic Management Society's Lifetime Achievement Award.

Hunt was named one of the ten most influential black women in Britain by the Powerlist Foundation, and one of the 30 most influential people in the City of London by The Financial Times.

Hunt has received multiple honorary awards for her contributions to business and society. These include an honorary doctorate in law from the University of Warwick, the University of York and the University of Portsmouth and an honorary Fellowship from University College London.
