= Friedrich Sturm =

Austrian artist (1823–1898)

Friedrich Sturm, also Fritz Sturm (1823–1898) was an Austrian artist known for his decorative art and paintings of animals and flowers.

== Life ==
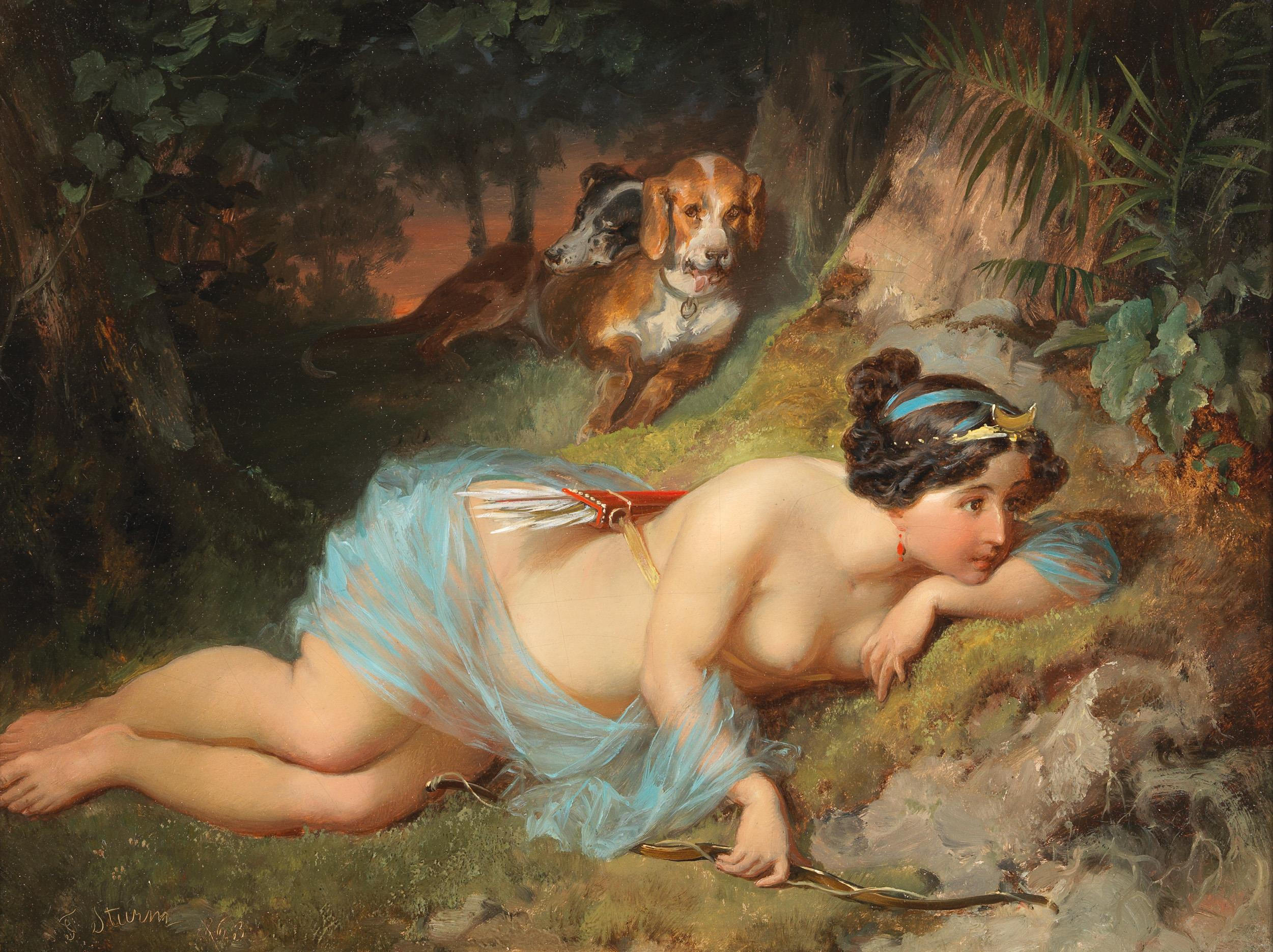
Sturm: Diana, Goddess of the Hunt (1863)

Sturm was born on 19 May 1823 in Vienna. He started out as a student of his father, who was a porcelain and enamel painter, and then attended the Academy of Fine Arts, Vienna. He then went on a study trip to Serbia and Hungary, where he worked as a theatre artist, portrait painter and painter of church art. He turned to fresco painting and specialized as a flower and animal artist. He decorated numerous Viennese buildings with wall and ceiling paintings, and he also painted on silk for the salon of the Empress of Austria. From 1853 to 1859 he sent his pictures to the monthly exhibitions of the Austrian Art Association. With the opening of the Museum of Art and Industry in Vienna in 1868 he became a professor at the associated School of Applied Arts, now the University of Applied Arts, and headed its department of plant, animal and ornament art until 1892. Women were also allowed to take part in his flower painting classes. From 1881 to 1889 he was director of the facility. He was retired due to illness in 1892. He died on 1 November 1898 in Weissenbach an der Triesting.

The artist Georg Sturm was his son and student.

Sturm was a member of the Eintracht artists' association and, from 1861, the Vienna Cooperative of Visual Artists (Künstlerhaus) and, from 1868, a member of the Vienna Academy of Fine Arts. He received numerous awards. In 1876 he became Knight of the Franz Joseph-Order.

== Literature ==
- Constantin von Wurzbach: "Sturm, Fritz." In: Biographisches Lexikon des Kaiserthums Oesterreich (Biographical Lexicon of the Empire of Austria). Part 40 Kaiserlich-königliche Hof- und Staatsdruckerei, Vienna 1880, p. 230 (digitalised).
- Franz Vallentin (1908). "Sturm, Friedrich" . Allgemeine Deutsche Biographie (in German). Vol. 54. Leipzig: Duncker & Humblot. pp. 631–632.
- Hans Vollmer, ed. (1938). Sturm, Friedrich (Fritz). Vol. 32: Stephens–Theodotos. Leipzig: E. A. Seemann. p. 253.
