= Chickenfoot (domino game) =

Domino game

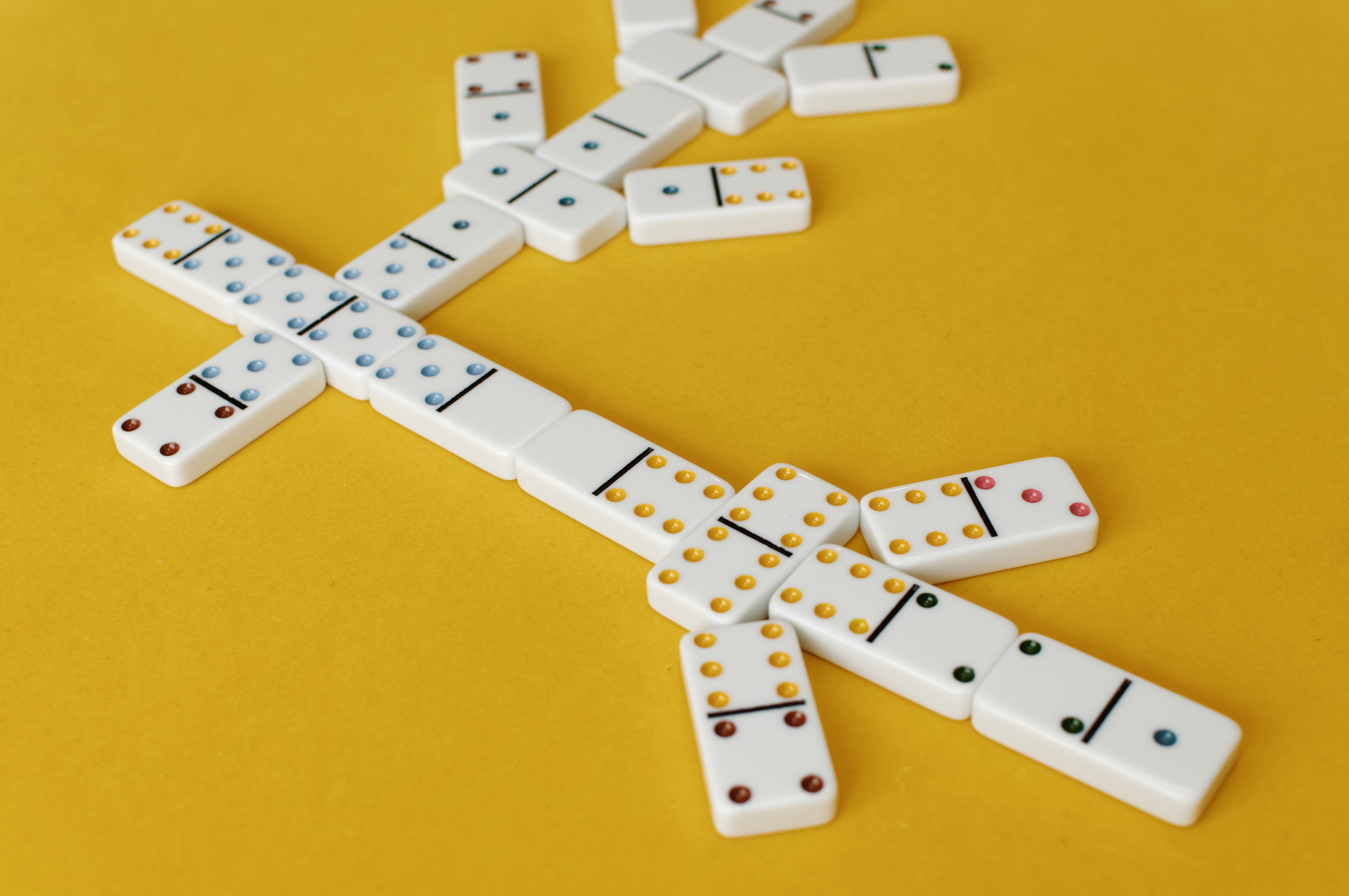
A game of Chicken Foot in progress

Chickenfoot or Chicken Foot, also called Chicken-Foot Dominoes and Chickie Dominoes, (Note: The spelling and capitalisation of this game vary, but around three-quarters of reliable sources use Chickenfoot and Chicken Foot. The 'chicken foot' feature within the game is usually in lower case.) is a Block domino game of the "Trains" family for 2 to 12 players invented by Louis and Betty Howsley in 1986. Chicken Foot is played in rounds, one round for each double domino in the set and is best for 4 to 7 players.

== Objective ==
The goal of the game is to have the lowest score by the end of the last round. For each round, the goal is for the player to empty their hand of dominoes by playing them on the board.

== Setup ==
The dominoes are first turned face down and shuffled. Then, each player picks seven dominoes to form their hand. With more than four players, the game requires an extended set. The number of dominoes drawn can be increased when fewer players are using a larger set (for instance, four players using a double-twelve set can draw 15 dominoes). Any remaining dominoes are placed to the side, forming the boneyard.

A typical opening setup for the first round of a game. All four sides of the opening double must be covered before play can continue. (Some people play that you only complete three sides, not four directions. One lines up at a right angle To the original double. The other two go on the opposite side at 45 degree angles. The completed thing looks like a Y with a line through the middle.)

== The first round ==
The round begins with the highest double being placed in the center of the layout to start the game (using a double-twelve set, this would be the double 12). (In each succeeding round, the next lowest double is found and placed as the starting point: 11, 10, 9, etc. until the last round using the double blank).

In the first round only, everyone draws a single domino from the boneyard. The player drawing the highest value begins the round and everyone returns their drawn domino to the boneyard. The starting player must play a matching domino (one with an end of the same value as the double) from their hand on one of the four sides of the double, with the matching end against the double. The next player plays another matching domino on a remaining side, and this continues until all four sides are filled. If a player cannot play because they do not have a matching domino, then the player must draw one domino from the boneyard. If that domino does not match, their turn passes to the next player. No other plays can be made until all four sides of the double are filled.

Once all four sides of the double are filled, the player to the left of the last person to fill the double can play any domino in their hand that matches an exposed end of a played domino. If a player is unable to match any exposed dominoes, they must draw one domino from the bone pile and either play it if possible or pass. If the boneyard has been emptied, any player who cannot play simply passes. If no player can play or draw, the round ends.

== Chicken foot and chicken toes ==
An example of a chicken foot, played with fours. A double is played with its long side against the endpoint, and no other play can be made until three matching dominoes have been played on the other side

Any time a player plays a matching double on an endpoint, the player calls "Chickie (number)" to indicate they have started a new "chicken foot". For example, if a player played a double-four (🂃) on the end of a 6-4 (🁟) domino they would lay it long side against the end with the 4 and call "Chickie Fours". No other dominoes can be played until three more 4's are played against the other side of the double-four. The three dominoes played against the double-four are played on the long side opposite the side originally played. In this case, the 4-3 (🁐) is placed horizontally and the 4-0 (🁍) and 4-2 (🁏) are placed diagonally to form the three toes.

The result will look like a chicken foot (hence the name of the game) with the double having one domino laid perpendicular to one side, and three more dominoes, the 'chicken toes', on the opposite side, the middle being perpendicular and the other two at 45 degrees to perpendicular. Any player who does not have a domino matching the played double must draw a domino from the bone pile and then play it if it matches or pass. Once three matching dominoes are played to finish the chicken foot, the next player may play a domino on any matching endpoint, including any of the three branches of the new chicken foot.

== Ending a round ==
A round is over when either one player plays the last domino in their hand or no players can make a legal play. The latter situation can occur if someone plays a double that no longer has three remaining free dominoes to play on it and the boneyard is exhausted.

At the end of each round, each player sums up the spots on the dominoes in their hand, which becomes their score for that hand and is added to their running total. In each subsequent round, the highest double drawn that has not yet been used to start a round starts the next round. When a round for each double has been played, the game is over and player with the lowest score wins.

A game cannot end in a double. If it does, the player who played a double as their last move gets 50 points. A player who holds the double blank in their hand at the end of a round gets 50 points, but a blank half has no value other than the number on the other half.

== See also ==
- Glossary of domino terms

== Bibliography ==
- Kelley, Jennifer A. (1999). Great Book of Domino Games. NY: Sterling.
