= Yvonne Field =

British activist and social entrepreneur (born 1960)

Yvonne Field OBE
- Born: 4 March 1960 (age 66); London, England
- Occupations: activist and social entrepreneur
- Known for: Social Justice Advocacy and Community Wealthbuilding

Yvonne Field OBE is a social justice advocate and social entrepreneur focusing on community wealth-building and is founder and CEO of The Ubele Initiative. She was appointed Officer of the Order of the British Empire (OBE) in the 2023 Birthday honours list for her services to the voluntary, community and social enterprise sector and social justice.

== Early life ==
Born on 4 March 1960, the seventh and youngest girl of ten children of Windrush parents from Jamaica, her mother was Mary Mulvenia Field and her father Ferdinand Bancroft Field. Yvonne Anita Field grew up mainly in Deptford, south London, in one of the first Black families in the area. As well as learning tap dancing, recorder and guitar, Field enjoyed writing to pen-pals, and had over a hundred pen-pals globally.

== Education ==
Field became involved in social activism from an early age. At 11 years old, the sole Black girl among seven candidates, she was denied a place at the local grammar school. The reason given for her rejection was that her mother, despite having Indefinite leave to remain, was not a British citizen (shortly afterwards Mrs Field received her British passport). With no available places in other schools, her mother took up the fight. Field credits her mother's actions as a strong influence on her life and subsequent decisions.

Supported by the then, Race Relations Board, Field challenged the initial decision with the assistance of local Black activist Alrick 'Ricky' Cambridge (a founding member of the Black Unity and Freedom Party) and a team of local Black students. Eventually, Field was offered a place at Haberdashers' Aske's Hatcham Grammar School in New Cross, London, where she thrived, despite being a Black working-class girl in a predominantly white middle-class school. Along the way, she learned the challenging lessons of navigating white culture and communities.

At 16, Field moved to the more culturally diverse Hackney Community College (now New City College). This, coupled with the influence of the Black Power movement and Black-led feminism in the USA, helped to shape her Black political consciousness as a young woman.

Her decision not to pursue a career in teaching led Field to embrace the concept of informal education through youth work and community education. She studied Community and Youth Work and Social Work at the highly reputed Westhill College, Birmingham, from 1980 to 1982. The Reverend Frederick William (Fred) Milson (1912–1983), as a lecturer and Head of Department (1960–1977), had played a significant role in the development of youth and community work, contributing to the professionalisation of the field. Committed to lifelong learning, Field was later awarded a teaching qualification through assessment and recognition of her prior training and development experience and subsequently became a Fellow of the Institute of Education and Training.

She continued her education gaining an MA degree in Social and Community Work from Bradford University in 1989, and an MSc degree in Change Agent Skills and Strategies from the University of Surrey in 2009.

In 2012, Field was awarded a Winston Churchill Memorial Trust Travel Fellowship. She embarked on learning journeys to Atlanta, USA, and New Zealand, where she met with individuals and visited socially innovative organisations involved in leadership and social change initiatives. Comparing and contrasting models and processes used to develop leadership within communities facing discrimination and social exclusion, she produced a report focusing on Black leadership and the development of community sustainability through enterprise.

== Career ==
Field started her career working in community education as an Advisory Worker for Work with Girls and Young Women, first with the Lambeth Girls Project (1983–1985) and then with the Inner London Education Authority (1985–1986). She subsequently spent over two years in the Caribbean with the Commonwealth Youth Programme, based in Guyana. During this time, she travelled extensively, conducting research, providing advice and technical assistance to twelve governments, and designing and delivering various development programmes for youth and community professionals, also acting as tutor on the Diploma in Youth and Community Development.

Returning to the UK, Field worked for six years with the London Borough of Greenwich as an Assistant Education Officer for Community Education. Her responsibilities included working on education policy and planning, as well as managing the central youthwork function. She then spent four years as the Youth and Play Work Training Coordinator at the Centre for Public and Voluntary Sector Development at Goldsmiths, University of London (1996–2000). In this role, she developed and delivered accredited learning programmes for youth workers, play workers, and adults mentoring and supporting young people.

While holding a part-time position in academia, Field established herself as an independent organisational development consultant under the name Yvonne Field Training & Consultancy (1996–2000). She worked as a consultant and trainer, primarily collaborating with local government and the third sector on organisational development, community solutions, and evaluation services.

This consultancy evolved into Yvonne Field Associates (YFA) (2000–2015), a management consultancy and training company with a team of up to 20 associates. YFA focused on promoting social inclusion, diversity, and dynamic partnerships. Services included interim management solutions, service reviews, evaluation of services, change management, and organisational development interventions. YFA also designed and delivered tailor-made accredited learning and development programs and Field mentored and coached over 40 women-led businesses and start-ups. In addition to running this successful company, Field provided advice to the UK Government and regional governments on the development of Black and racially-minoritised communities and women's enterprise.

During this time, Field served as a Senior Associate (2010–2012) at Reos Partners in Oxford and Johannesburg, where she co-designed and co-delivered complex social system change projects, also holding the position of Programme Manager for the MSC in Management in Innovation Studies at Wits Business School in Johannesburg, South Africa from 2012 to 2013.

From 2014 to 2020, Field worked part-time at Goldsmiths University as a lecturer on the BA (Hons) Community Development and Youth Work degree. Additionally, she supported student professional practice on the MA in Social Anthropology and Youth Work, also serving as the External Examiner on the BA (Hons) Community Development and Youth Work programme at Worcester University from 2018 to 2021, contributing to the moderation of the undergraduate degree programme and overall quality assurance.

The part-time positions in academia provided Field with the space to pursue her passion for community development and social justice, leading to the launch of The Ubele Initiative in 2014. Ubele, derived from the Swahili word for "the future," is a national social enterprise founded by Field in 2014 to address the historical lack of funding for Black and racially-minoritised communities. Its primary objective is to act as a catalyst, supporting these communities in developing sustainable community spaces through intergenerational leadership, community enterprise, and social action. Ubele has five strategic objectives: strengthening communities through enterprise and asset development; advocating for equity and justice; strengthening infrastructure and voice; developing people, groups, and organisations; and fostering partnerships and has supported over 6000 people across the UK through leadership programmes, capacity building, and managing £13.5million of direct grant support during the COVID-19 pandemic. The organisation has also established strategic partnerships with 28 countries, mainly in Europe, as well as with key national, social and community enterprise organisations, including Access Foundation, Locality, Power to Change, and Social Investment Business.

Ubele is based at Wolves Lane Horticultural Centre in Haringey, north London, where Field currently serves as the Director, with Ubele and Organic Lea as legal partners, responsible for stewarding the ongoing regeneration and development of the Wolves Lane Centre. Formerly a local authority parks and gardens depot, the site has been transformed into a thriving space for sustainable growing, education, social enterprise, and community engagement in north London.

In February 2020, The Ubele Initiative was appointed as one of five "specialist civil society infrastructure organisations" to receive two years of grant funding from a partnership between the Mayor of London, City Bridge Trust, and the National Lottery Community Fund. In April 2020, Field led the launch of a petition to investigate why Black and Minoritised communities were disproportionately impacted by COVID-19 in the UK. A Ubele Foundation report in May 2020 warned that COVID-19 might force many small Black and Minoritised charities to cease operations. Later that month, Field welcomed the call by the Mayor of London, Sadiq Khan, for an independent public inquiry into the disproportionate impact of COVID-19 on Black and Minoritised communities.

In June 2020, Field, along with Derek Bardowell and Sado Jirde, resigned from an equity working group organised by the National Emergencies Trust, citing disillusionment and a lack of meaningful dialogue. In late 2020, a follow-up Ubele Initiative report called for a national infrastructure body to support Black and Minoritised voluntary organisations.

The same year, Ubele launched, and currently leads, Elevate, a leadership development programme for Black and Racially-Minoritised individuals who identify as female, in partnership with four universities. The programme focuses on academic and professional services staff.

The Phoenix Way, led by Field as CEO of The Ubele Initiative and supported by Global Fund for Children and The National Lottery Community Fund, is a national collaborative partnership created during the COVID-19 pandemic as a response to the structural inequalities which Black and racially-minoritised communities and community-led organisations face in relation to influencing and accessing grant funding in the UK. It is a grant-making initiative aimed at transforming Black and racially-minoritised communities and was established in partnership with six Regional Leads and with the support of several UK funders, including The Youth Endowment Fund and the Lloyds Bank Foundation for England & Wales.

== Personal life ==
Field has one daughter, Omolara Martins, born in 1994 from her marriage to Desmond Martins (who she was divorced from in 2002). Field currently lives in north London.

== Bibliography ==
- Field, Y., (March) 2020, Developing a new generation of BAME community-based leaders, Lessons from an on-going journey, chapter in Community Development for Social Change by Dave Beck and Rod Purcell, Taylor & Francis / Routledge, (ISBN 978-1-315-52861-8).
