= Bunnock =

Throwing game

- Years active: Early 19th century
- Genres: Throwing games
- Players: 8
- Skills: Throwing

Bunnock (also known as the game of bones or simply bones) is a throwing game that is thought to have Russian origin. The aim of Bunnock is to throw bones at an oppositions rows of bones, trying to do so in the fewest throws possible. The team that knocks down all of the oppositions bones first, wins. Bunnock is played in teams of four, which must contain at least one person of the opposite sex. Persons of any age are allowed to participate. Historically bunnock was played with the ankle bones of horses; however, most modern sets use a resin replica version.

== History ==
The exact origin of Bunnock is unclear, however the most widely accepted version is that Bunnock originated in Northern Siberia during the early 19th century. It is thought to have been a version of the Mongolian game shagai, created by Russian soldiers that needed to entertain themselves while posted in remote areas of Siberia. These soldiers had an abundance of horse anklebones, which they found out they could stand upright. It is also believed that originally players would be situated in the centre of a circle, with players throwing outward at a circle of bones.

Bunnock would be introduced to Canada in the early 1900s by Russian and German immigrants. Most of these immigrants would settle in Saskatchewan, in which Bunnock became a popular farmyard pastime, farmers using their own horse anklebones.

In the 1960s, Joseph H. Gartner working at a horse meat processing plant, was granted the ability to salvage horse anklebones to make a set for his father. People living around Macklin, Saskatchewan caught word and also wanted sets. Gartner created a rulebook which standardized the rules and setup of Bunnock. These rules are still used today.

== Gameplay ==
=== Overview ===
Bunnock consists of two parallel rows of bones, each with 20 soldiers (marked in white) and 2 guards (marked in black). The objective of the game is to knock down your opponents bones, starting with the guards, after this you are able to hit the soldiers in any order. The team going first throws all of their throwers (marked in any distinct colour) at the opponents row. Once finished, the opposing teams is then allowed to throw their throwers. This goes on until the game ends. The first team to knock down all of the opposing team's bones wins the game, however each team is allowed to throw the same number of bones. If the team that went first knocked down all of the opposing teams bones first, the opposing team is allowed to throw back any of the bones that the other team used to attempt to knock down the remaining bones on the other team. In an event of a tie, an extra game is played.

=== Teams ===
A team consists of 4 players of any age which must contain at least one person of the opposing sex. A person can only play on one team. In the event that a player gets injured, the teammate will be replaced.

If a team is using any inappropriate language to the opposing team, an umpire can disqualify the team from play. If a team disagrees with the ruling, they can request the umpire to review the decision with two other empires. The ruling of this is final.

=== Setup ===
Two rows of 20 soldiers are placed parallel of each other, spaced 10 metres (32 ft 10 in) apart. A guard is placed on either end of the row, spaced out 40 cm (16 in) away from the row. An umpire flips a coin and calls a captain to call "Heads" or "Tails". The winner of the toss can either choose which end to play from, or choosing to shoot first or last. The opposing side gets the remaining option.

=== Play ===
These rules are retrieved from the official Bunnock rulebook.

1. All bones are thrown underhanded.
2. The throw line is the line that the bones are set up on, and extend 1 metre (3 ft 3 in) from either guard. The foul line is marked 1 metre (3 ft 3 in) in front of the throw line. You cannot at any point step over the foul line.
3. A bone that has been thrown over the foul line is not retrievable regardless of distance.
4. If a shot is declared foul, the shot is not counted. Any bones knocked down will be reset to their original positions.
5. Any opposition accidentally knocked down in any way is considered down.
6. In the event that a bone other than a guard is knocked down before both guards on that line have been knocked down, it will be placed 5 cm (2 in) inside the nearest guard. Any other bones knocked down before the guards, will be placed 5 cm (2 in) away from the previous bone. If there is no more space and another bone gets knocked down, the bone will be placed 5 cm (2 in) behind the replaced bone. If any of these bones are knocked down a second time, it shall be placed 5 cm (2 in) outside of the nearest guard and so on. If one of these bones is knocked down a third time it will be replaced where it fell.
7. If a bone beside a guard is knocked down at the same time as the first guard, the bone will be placed 5 cm (2 in) outside of the remaining guard. The first guard will be considered down.
8. A bone that has been thrown will remain in the same spot where it stopped until the end is completed.
9. Once both guards are down, no bones will be moved until the end is completed.
10. If a bone is leaning on a downed bone after an end is completed, the umpire will remove the downed bone unless both teams agree to leave the bone in the same spot. If the leaning bone stays upright, it is considered standing.
11. If a bone breaks when hit by a thrower and the base is still standing, the broken bone will be replaced with a new one.
12. Throwing order of bones on a team can change at any time, however a player must throw both bones before the next player can throw.
13. If more than one game is being played, the teams must switch sides, with the winner of the last game throwing first.

== Attractions ==
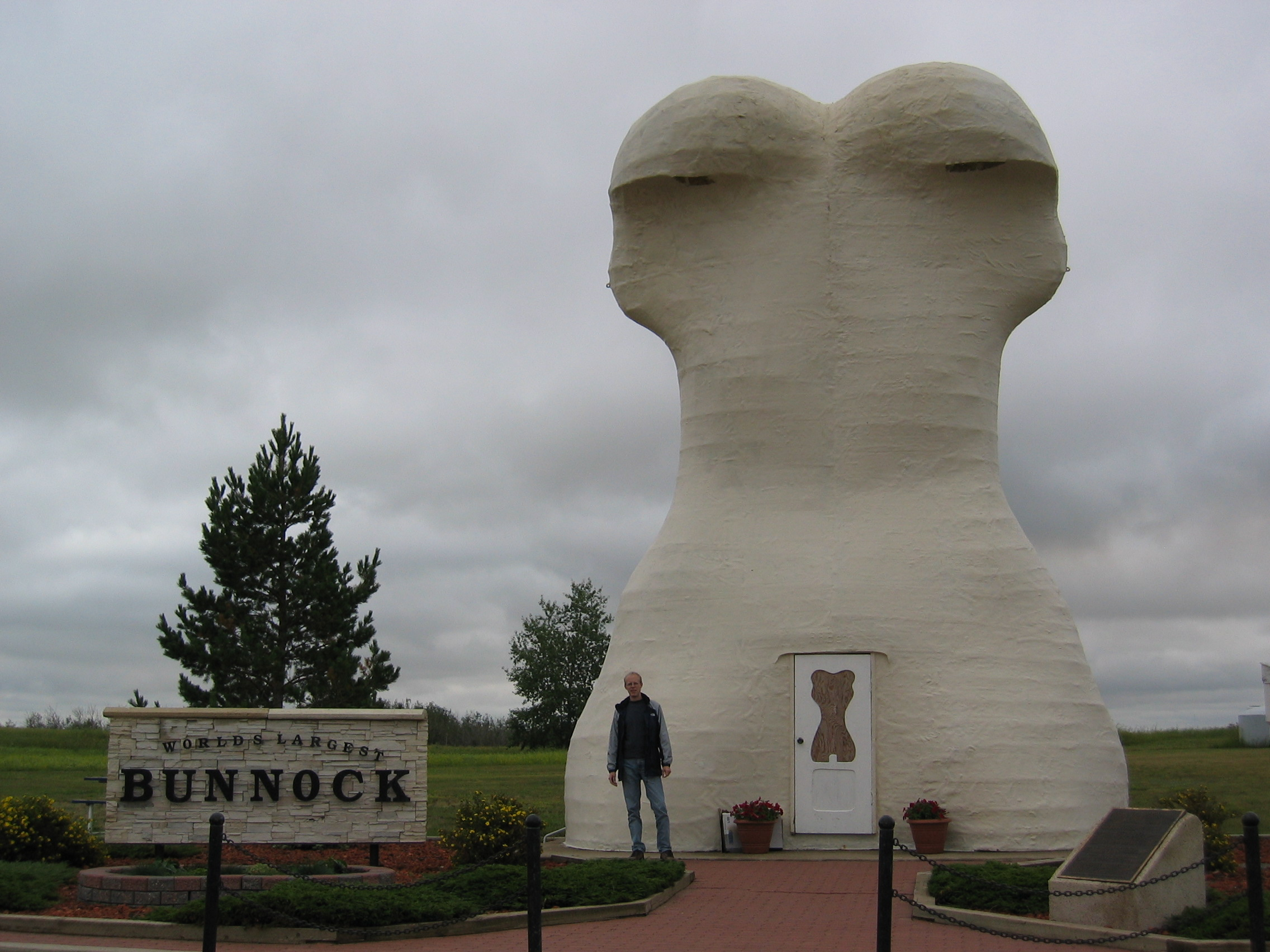
The World's Largest Bunnock, located in Macklin, Saskatchewan

Bunnock has become highly popular in the small town of Macklin, Saskatchewan located near the Alberta-Saskatchewan border. Macklin hosts the World Bunnock Championships every August in where the town nearly doubles in size. Macklin houses a tourist information booth that is a 9.8-metre (32 ft)-high fibre-glass horse anklebone replica. The information booth is located by the junction of Highway 31 and Highway 14.

== See also ==
- Finnish skittles, also known as kyykkä, the Finnish equivalent.
- Gorodki, the Russian equivalent.
- Horseshoes
- Kubb, the Swedish equivalent.
- Mölkky, another Finnish throwing game.
- Washers
