= Gorodki =

Russian throwing game

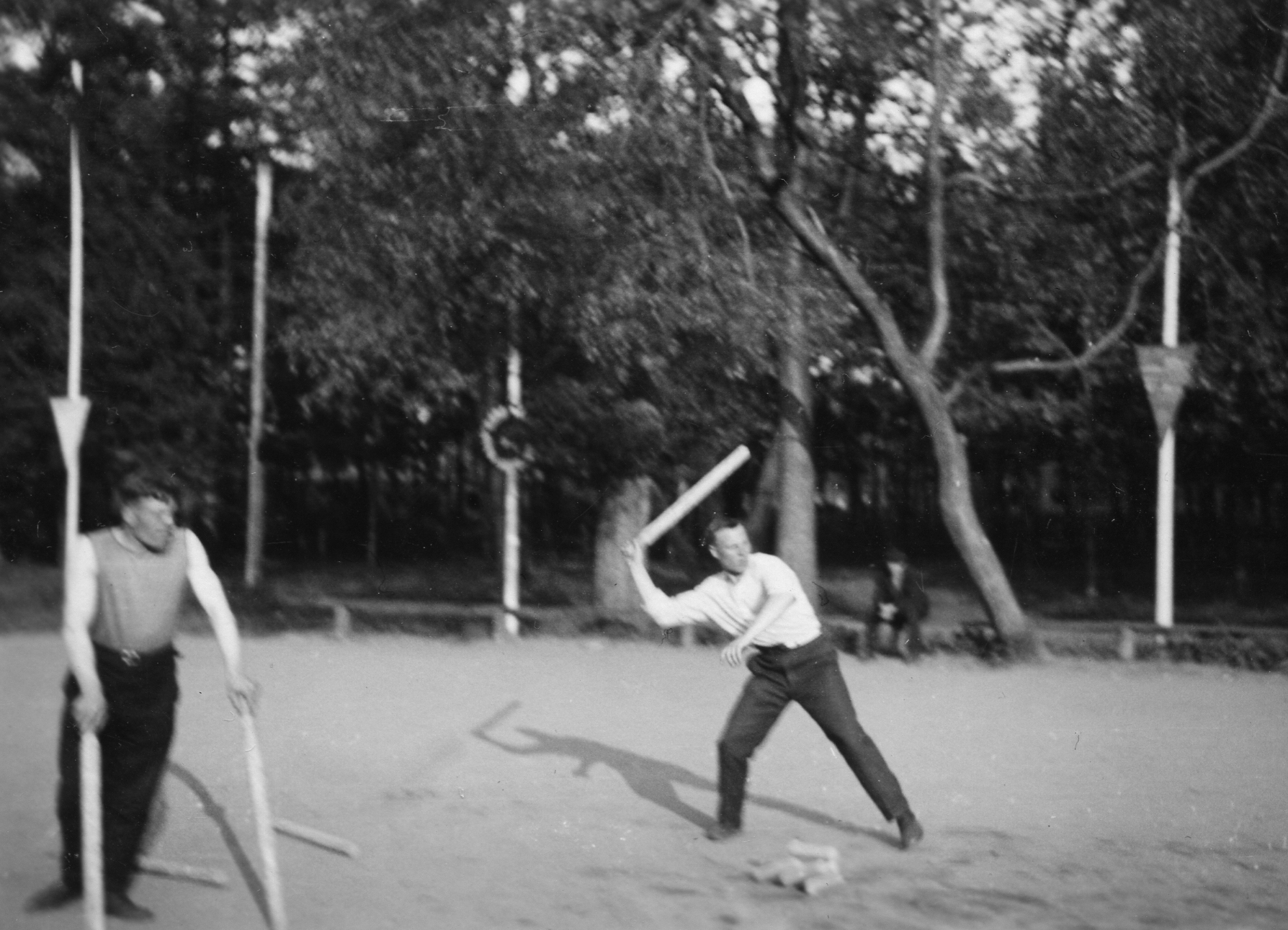
A game of gorodki in Moscow, 1935

Gorodki (Russian: Городки, lit. 'townlets'; Swedish: Poppi; Lithuanian: Miestučiai) is a Russian folk sport. Similar in concept to bowling and also somewhat to horseshoes, the aim of the game is to knock out groups of skittles arranged in various patterns by throwing a bat at them. The skittles, or pins, are called gorodki (literally "little cities" or "townlets"), and the square zone in which they are arranged is called the gorod ("city").

Its popularity has spread to Karelia, Finland, Sweden, Ingria, parts of Lithuania, and Estonia. In the Scandinavian and Baltic languages, the game has many different names, such as kurnimäng, kriuhka, köllöi, keili, and miestučiai. The Finnish variant is called kyykkä, or Finnish skittles.

The game was known in a form that is quite close to the modern one at least from the 17th century, since one of the most notable gorodki players was Peter the Great. It has survived in the contemporary period.

== Gameplay ==
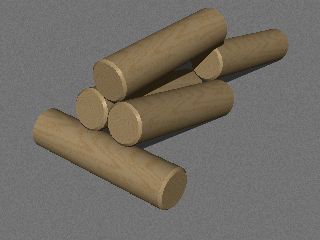
Gorodki arranged in the pushka ("cannon") pattern

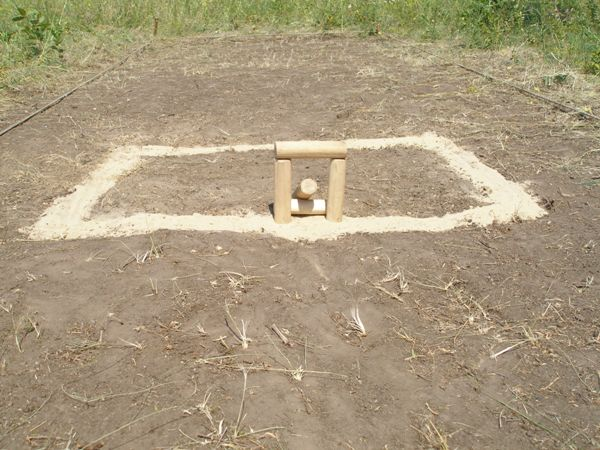
Gorodki target in "Machine gun installation" setup

The game consists of throwing a bat from a predetermined distance at the gorodki, which are arranged in one of 15 configurations:

- Cannon (пушка, pushka)
- Fork (вилка, vilka)
- Star (звезда, zvezda)
- Arrow (стрела, strela)
- Well (колодец, kolodets)
- Crankshaft (коленчатый вал, kolenchatyy val)
- Artillery (артиллерия, artilleriya)
- Racquet (ракетка, raketka)
- Machine gun installation (пулемётное гнездо, pulemyotnoe gnezdo)
- Lobster (рак, rak)
- Watchmen (часовые, chasovye)
- Sickle (серп, serp)
- Shooting gallery (тир, tir)
- Airplane (самолёт, samolet)
- Letter (письмо, pis'mo)

The goal is to completely knock the gorodki out of a marked square using the fewest possible number of throws.

When a player reaches the "letter" figure, a special set of rules apply:

- You must aim to the center spot and knock the gorodki in the figure out (players say "open the letter")
- Another four gorodki return to their place unless the center spot is knocked out
- You must knock the figure from 13 meters.

=== Gallery of figures ===
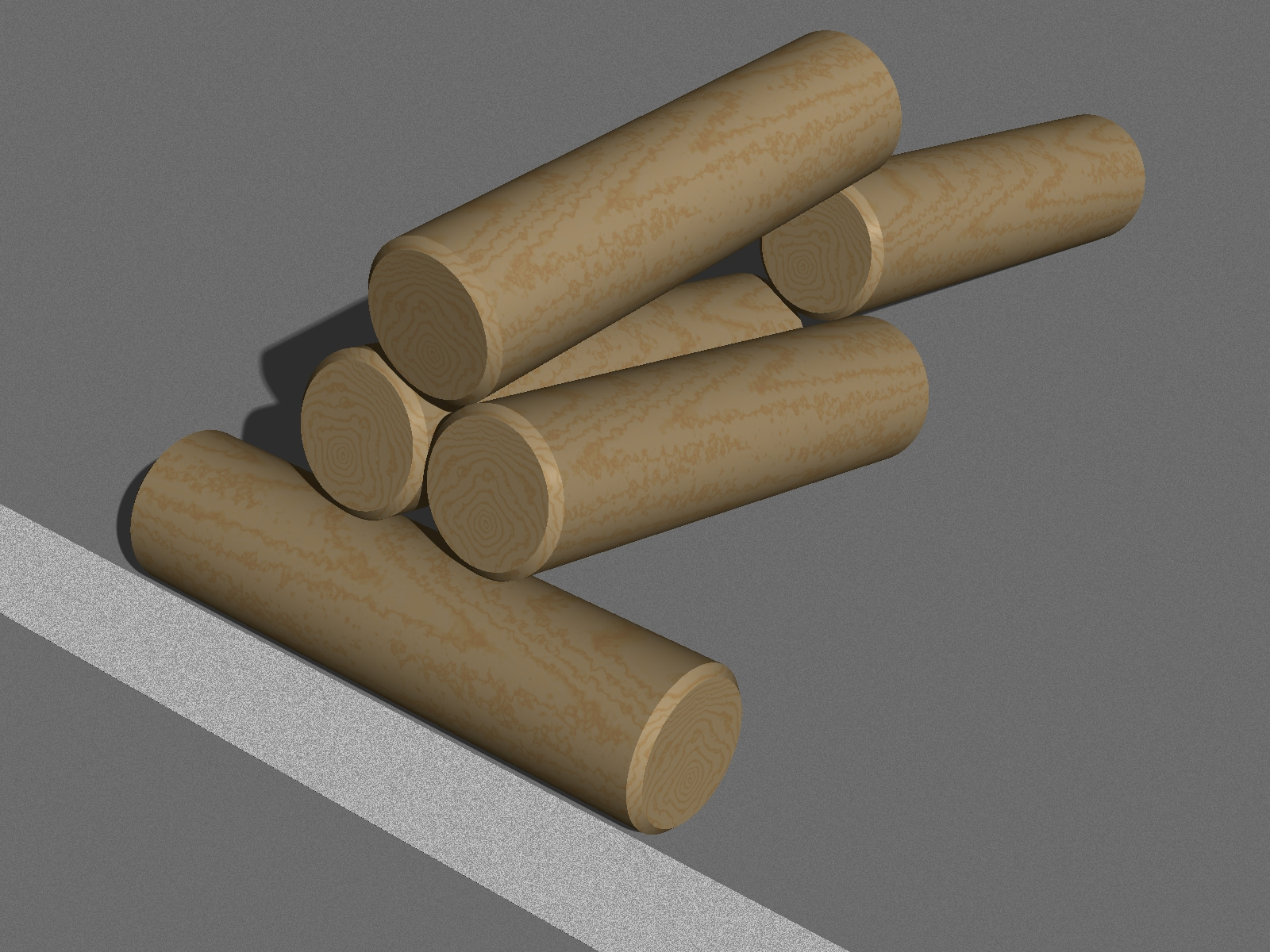
Cannon

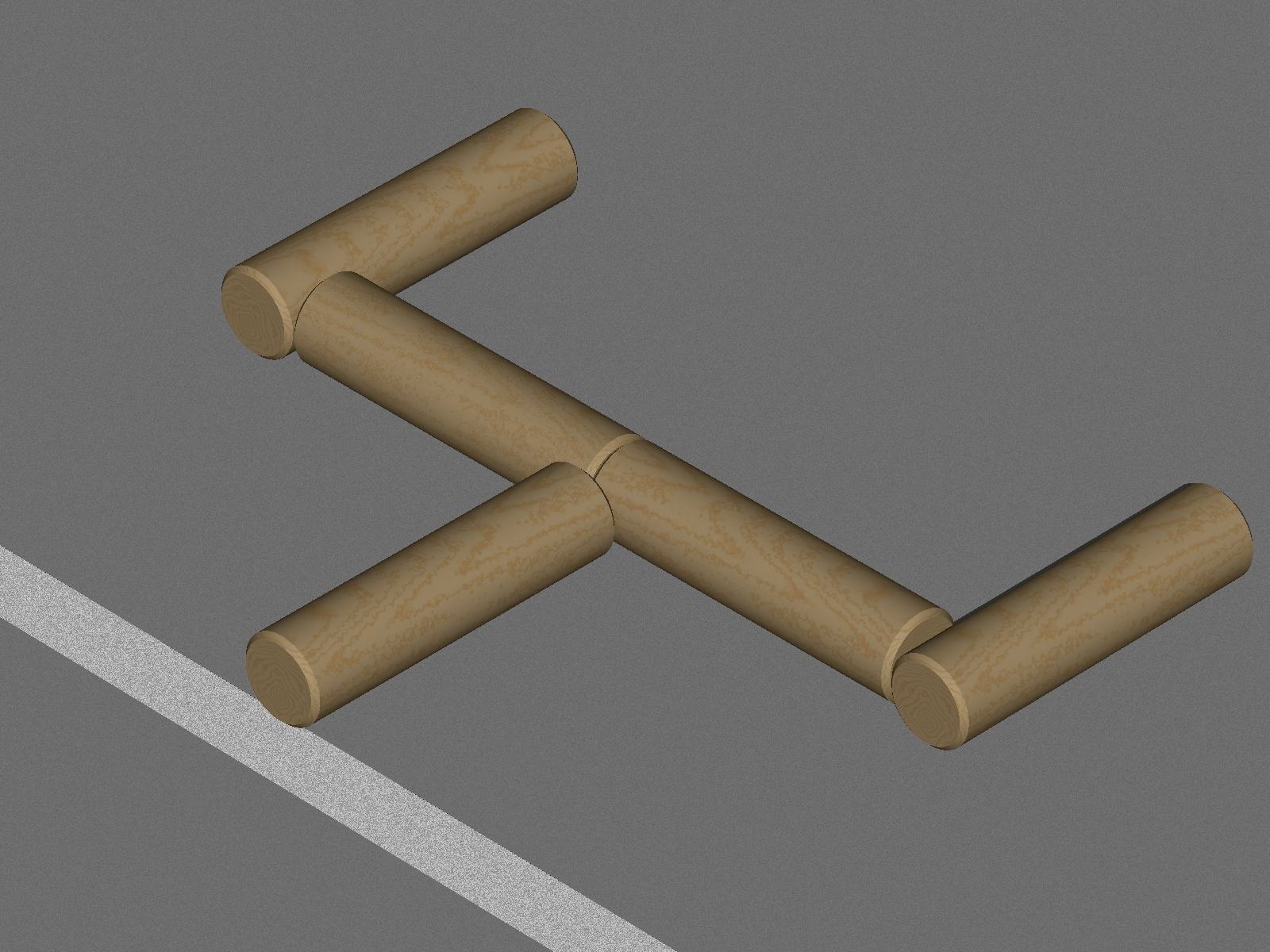
Fork

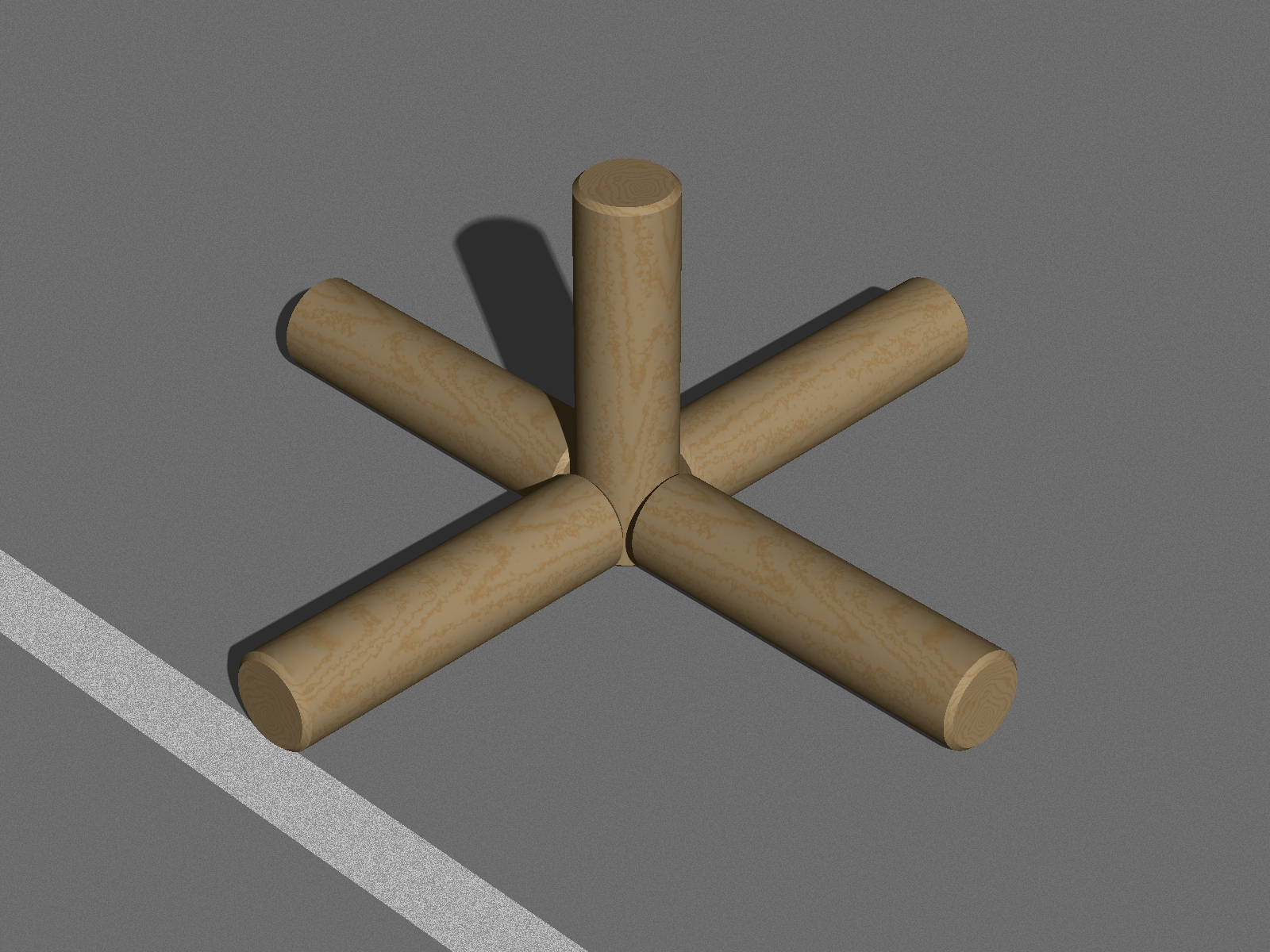
Star

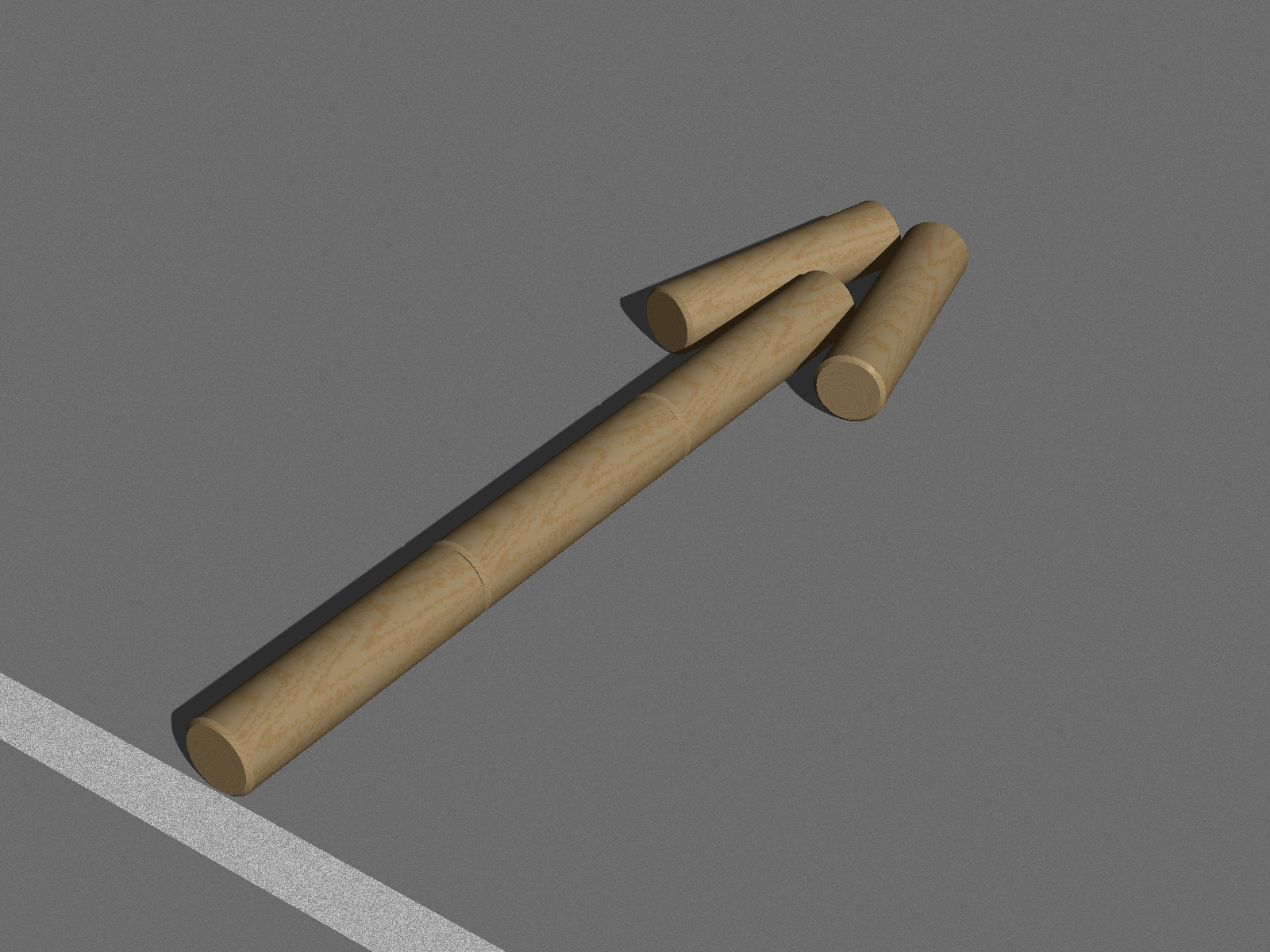
Arrow

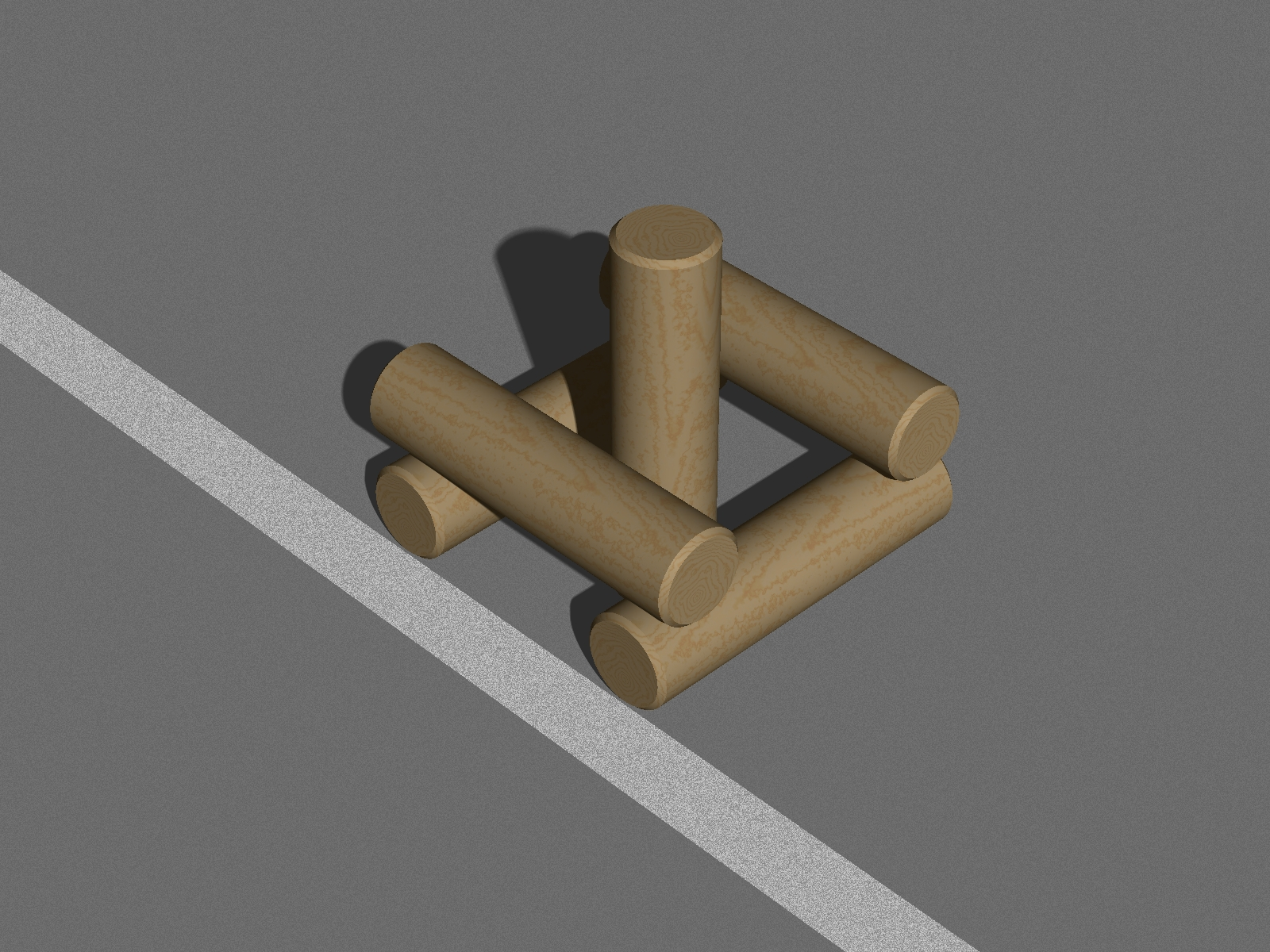
Well

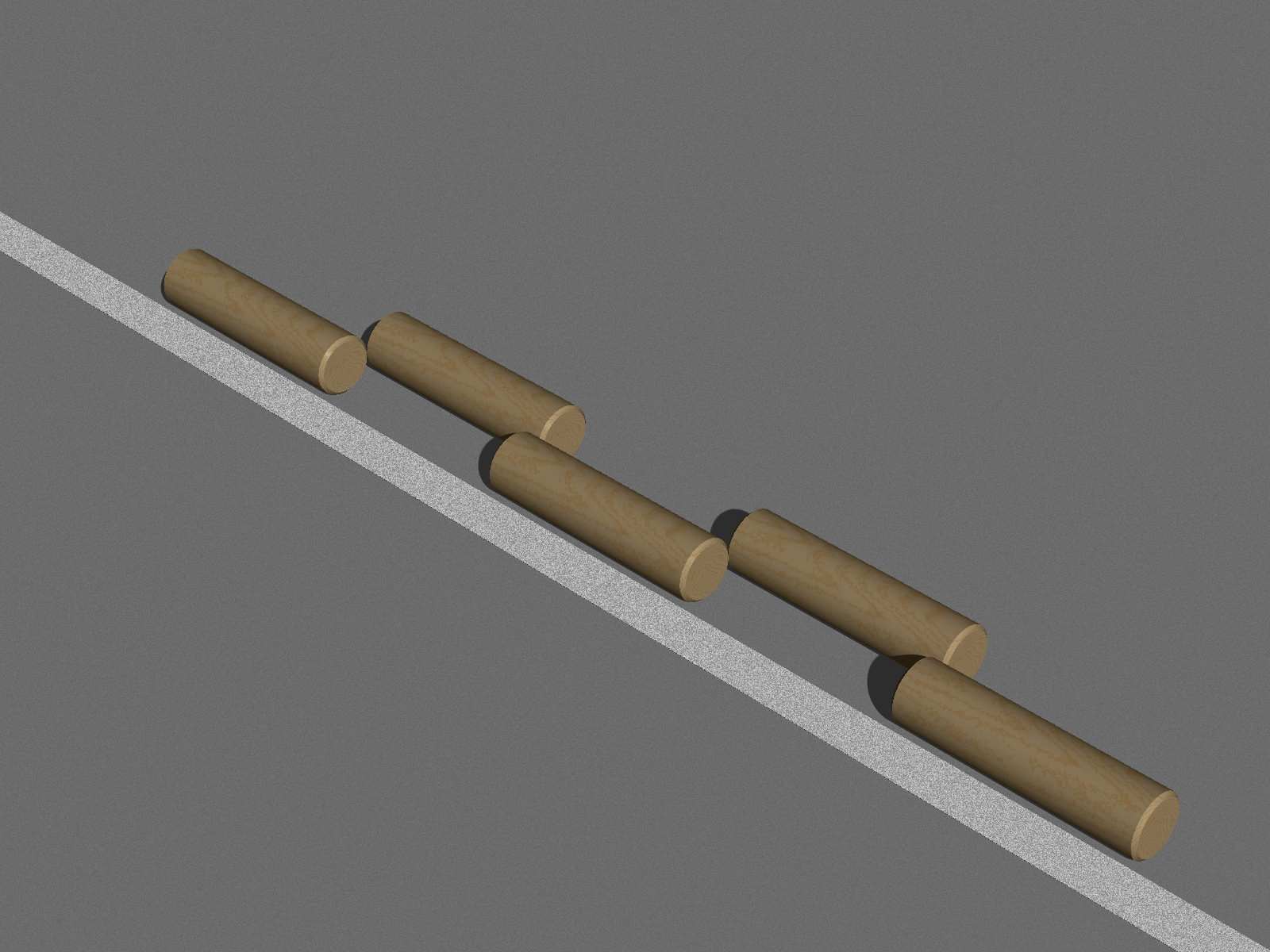
Crankshaft

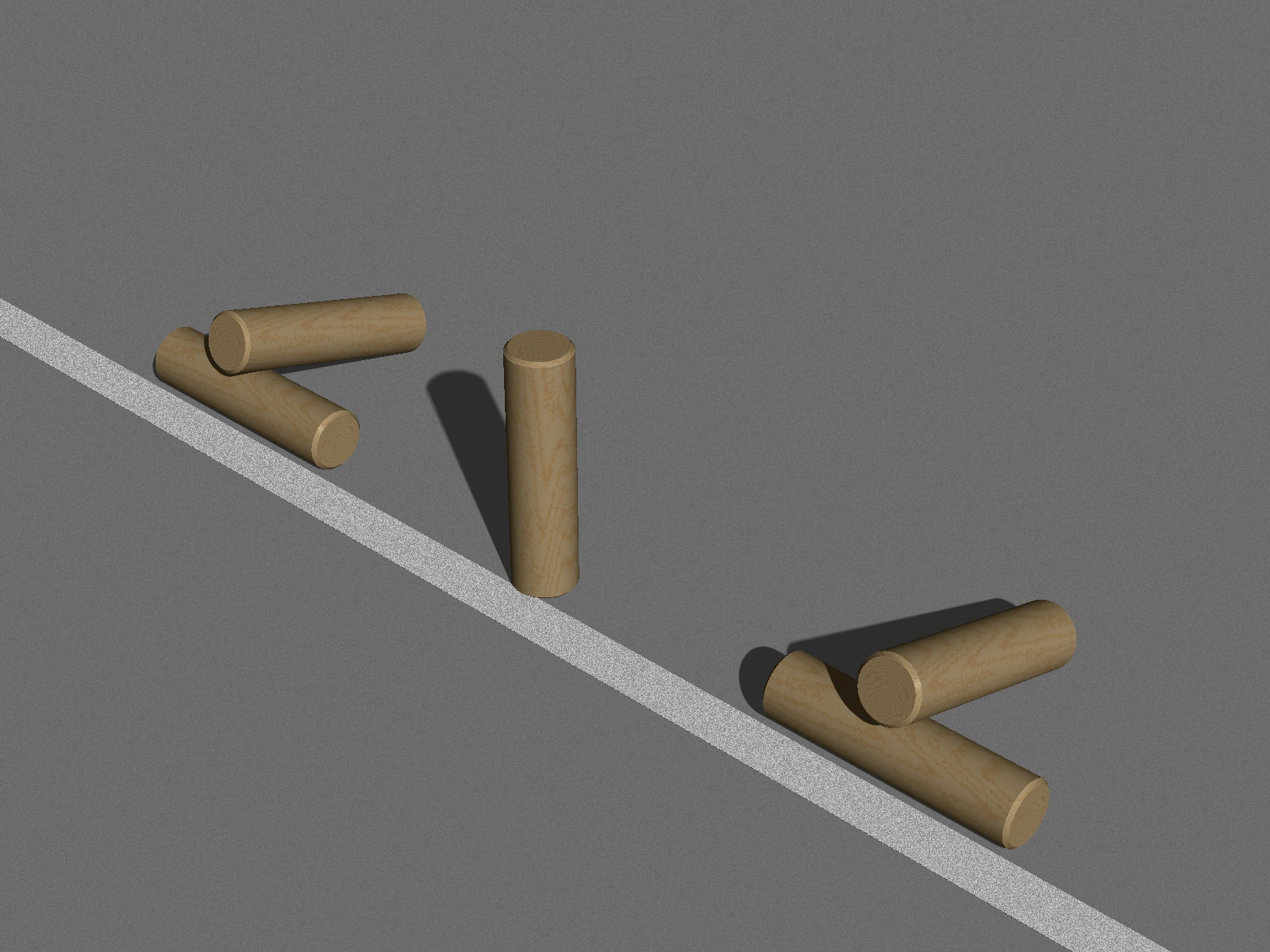
Artillery

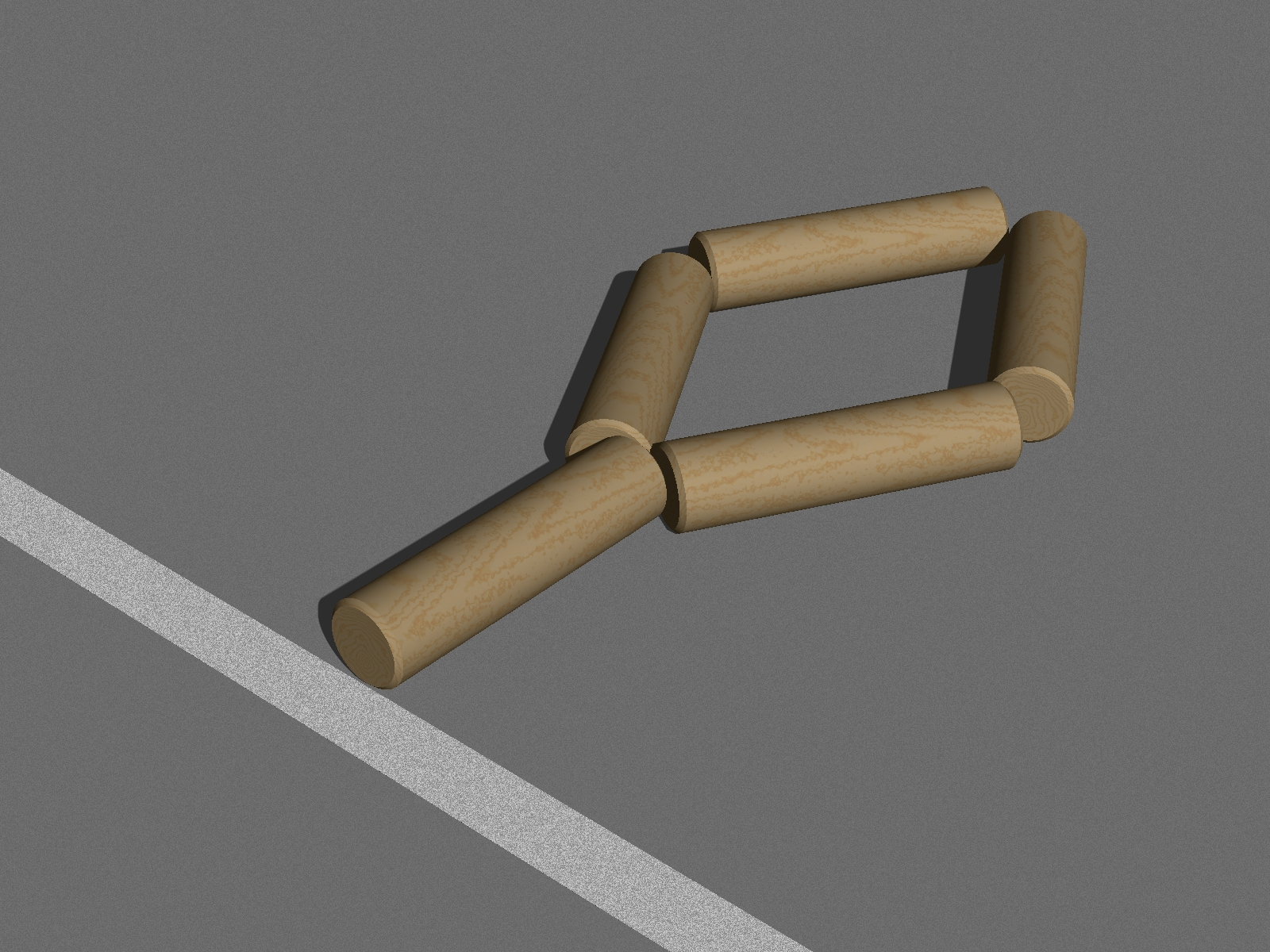
Racquet

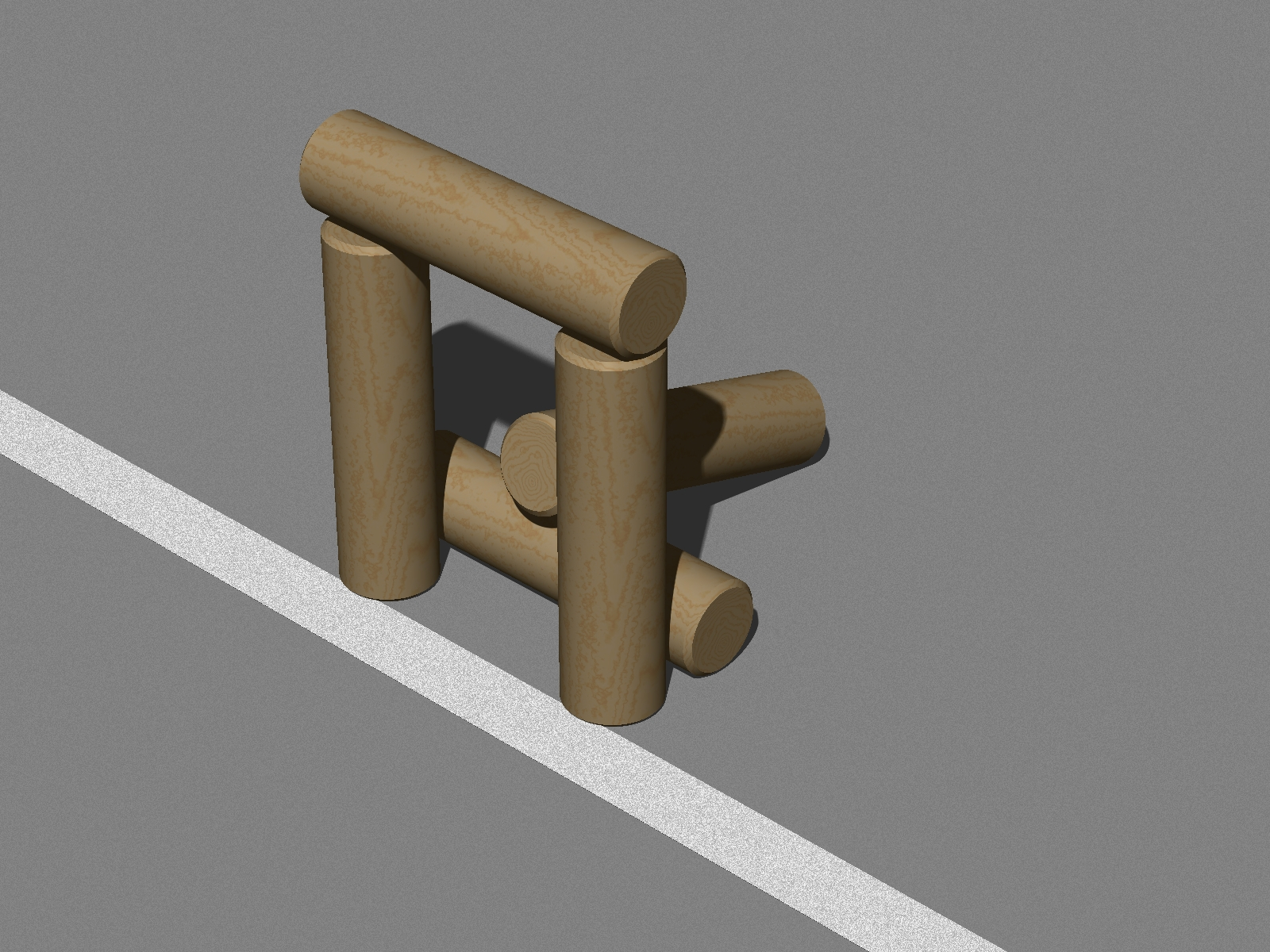
Machine gun installation

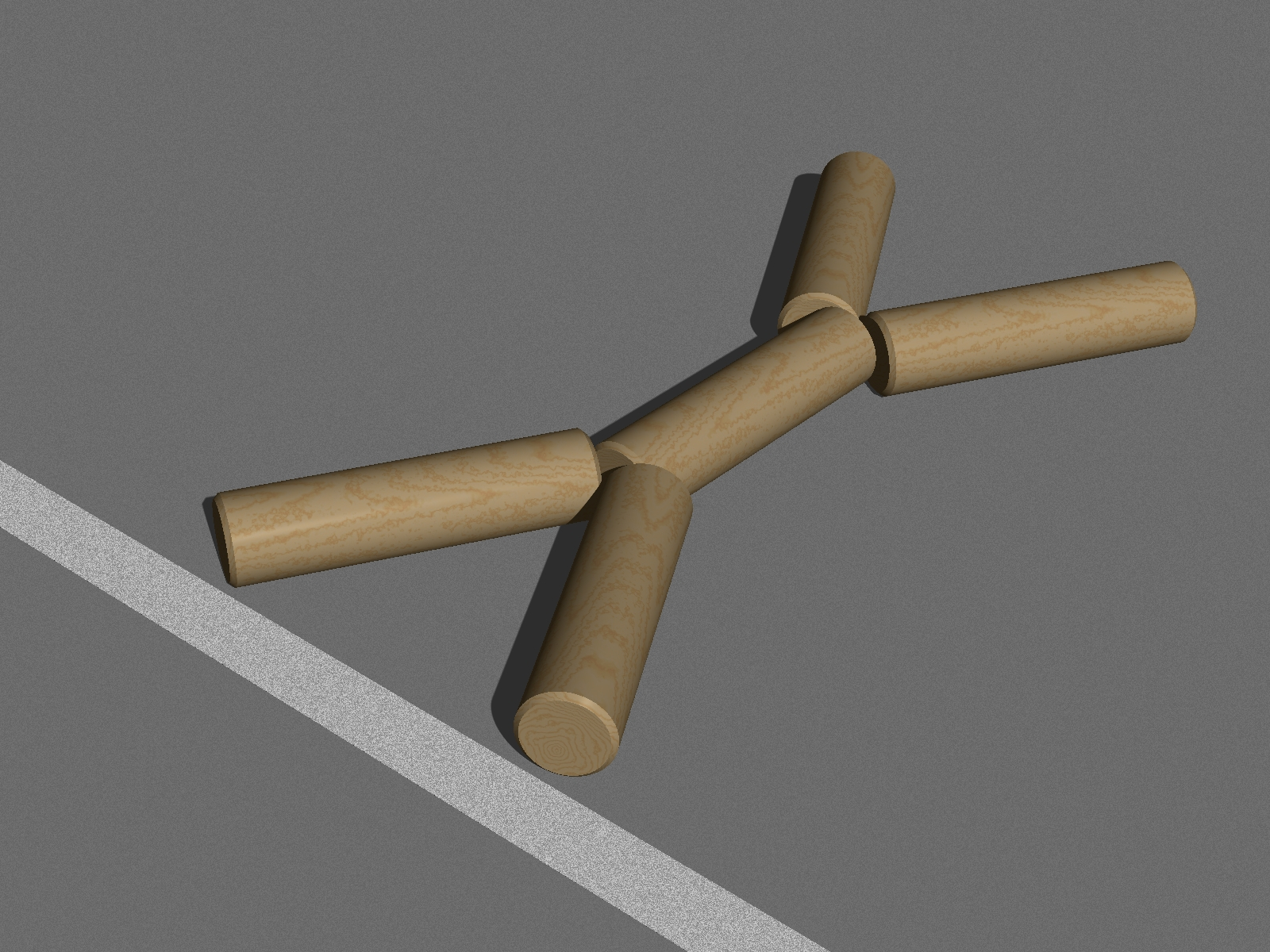
Lobster

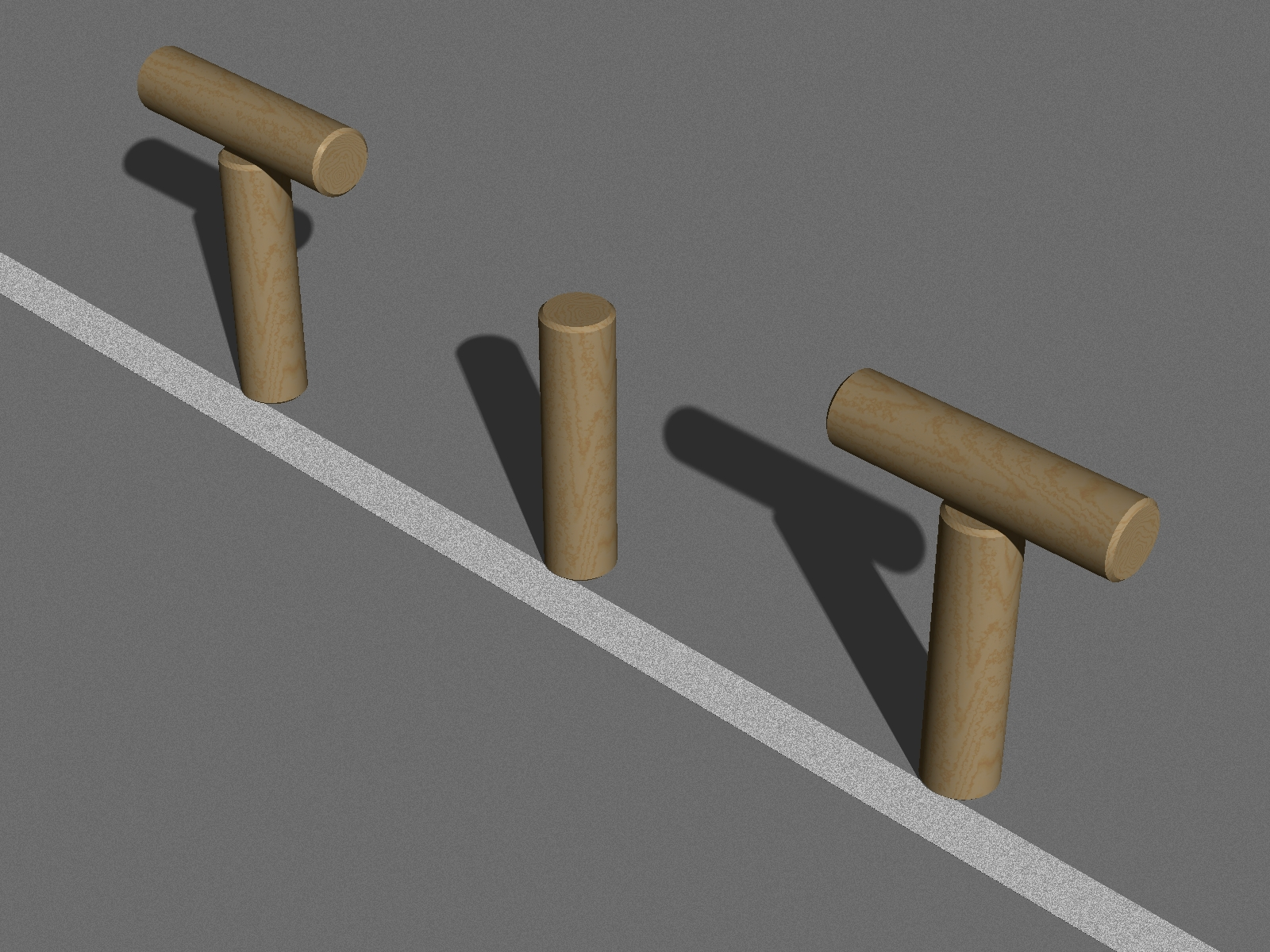
Watchmen

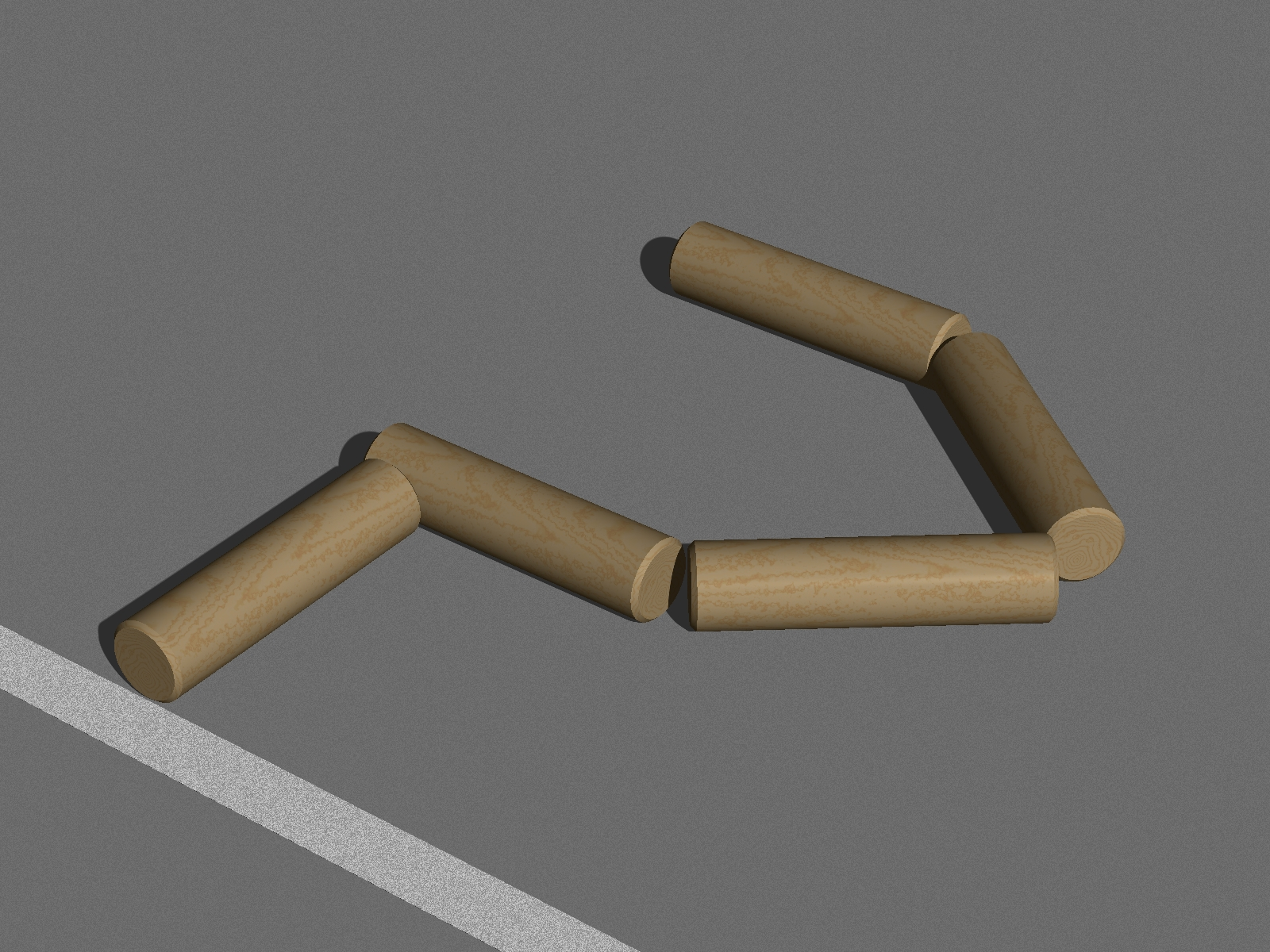
Sickle

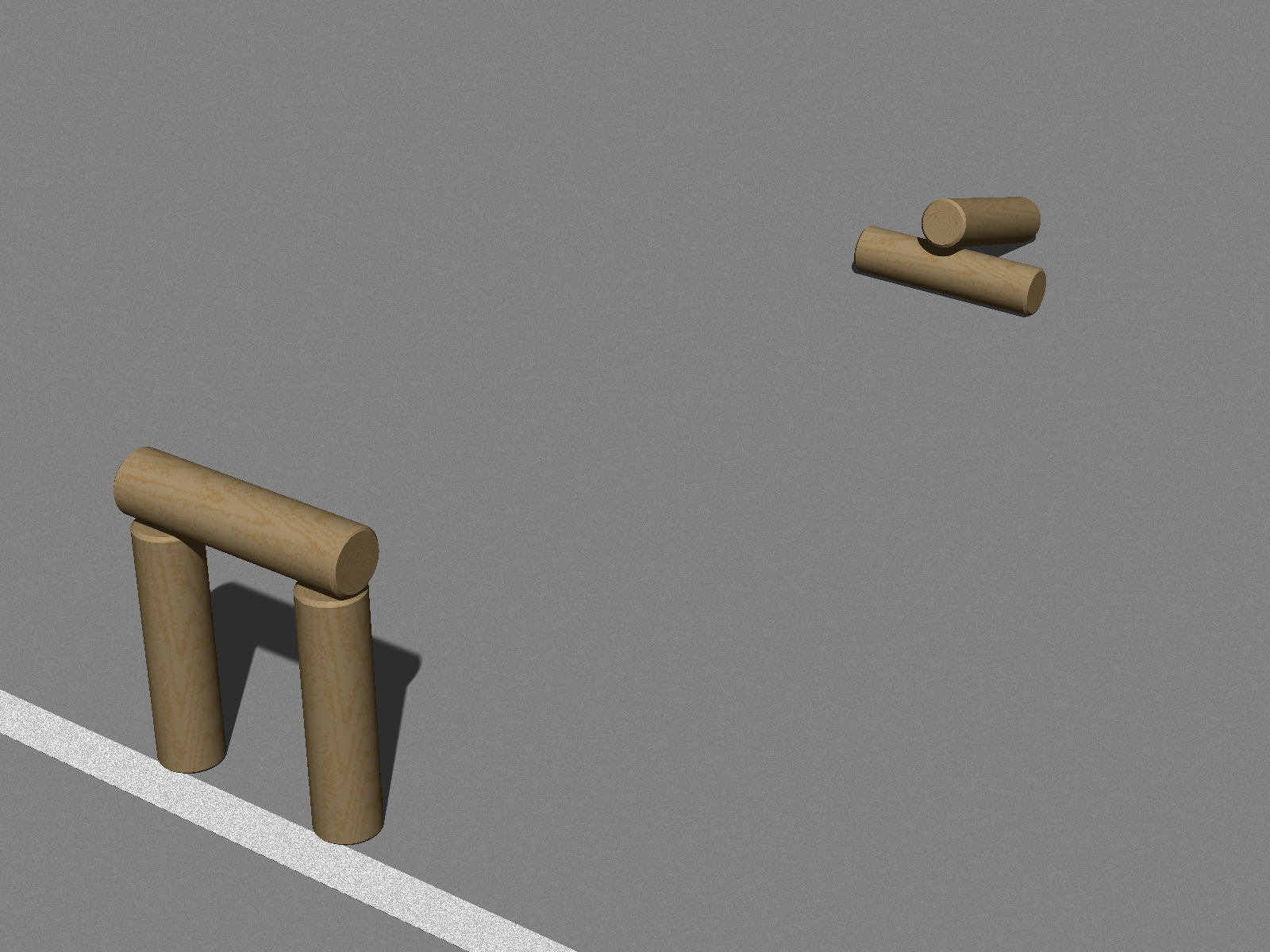
Shooting gallery

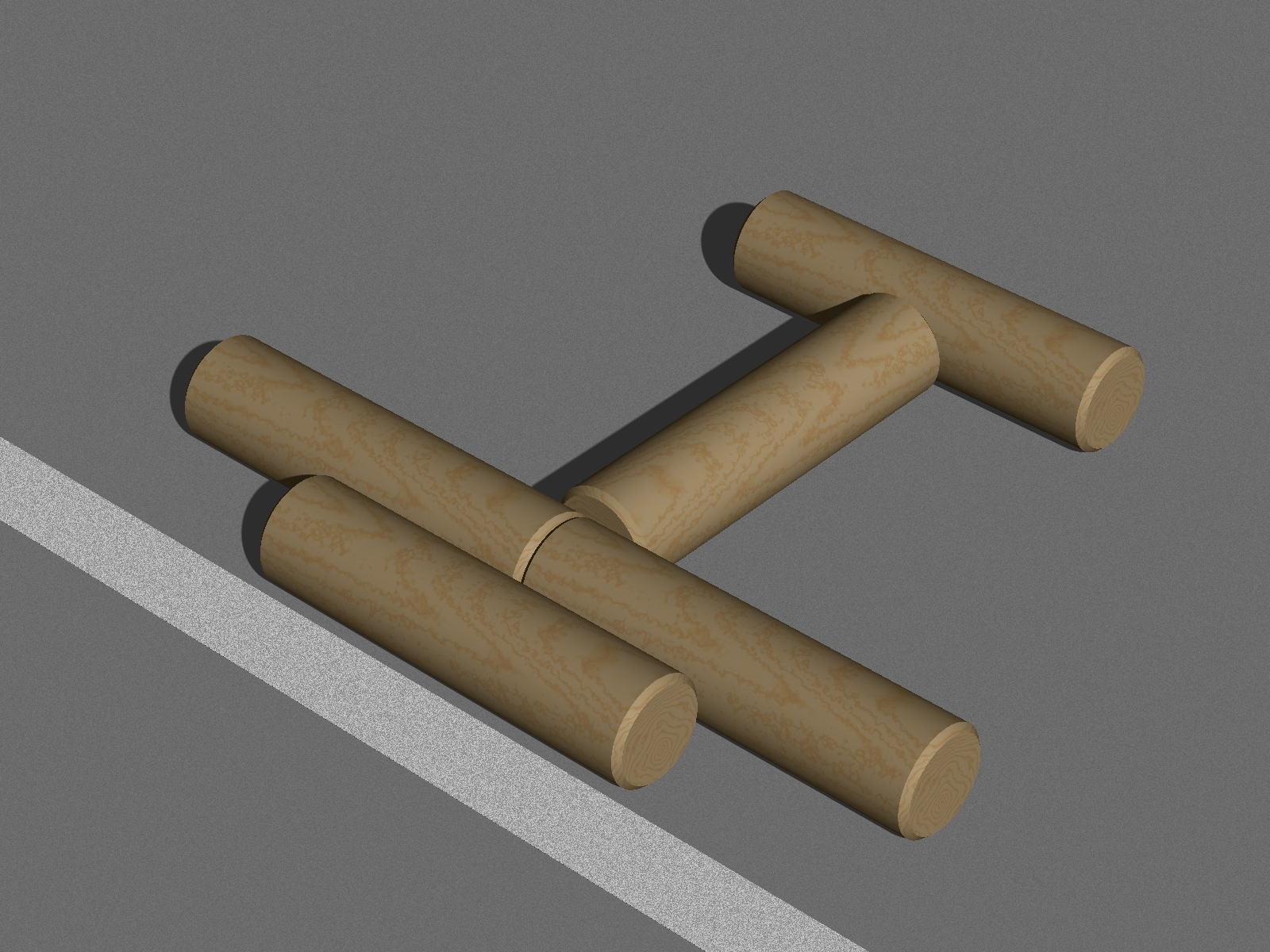
Airplane

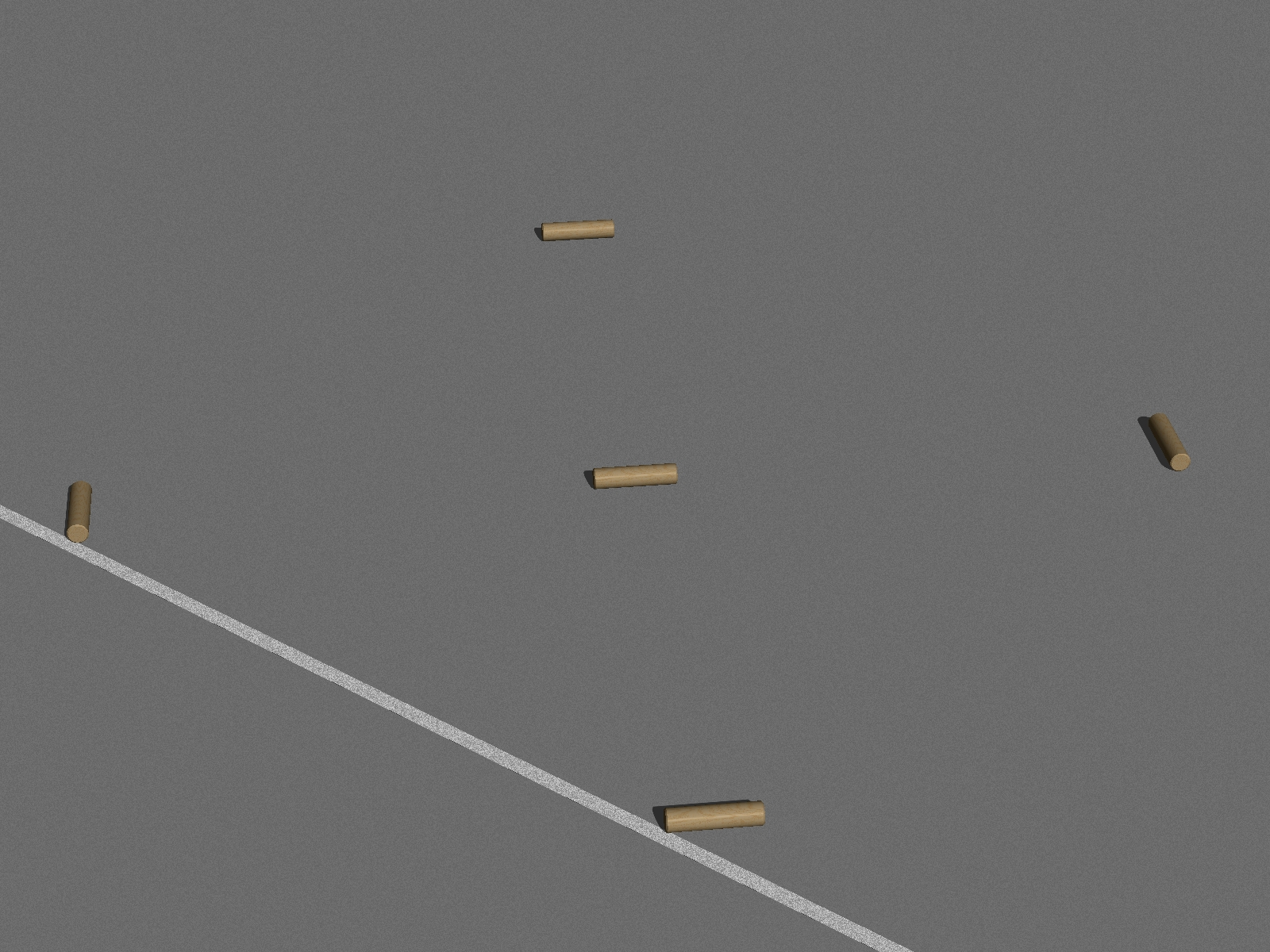
Letter

== History ==
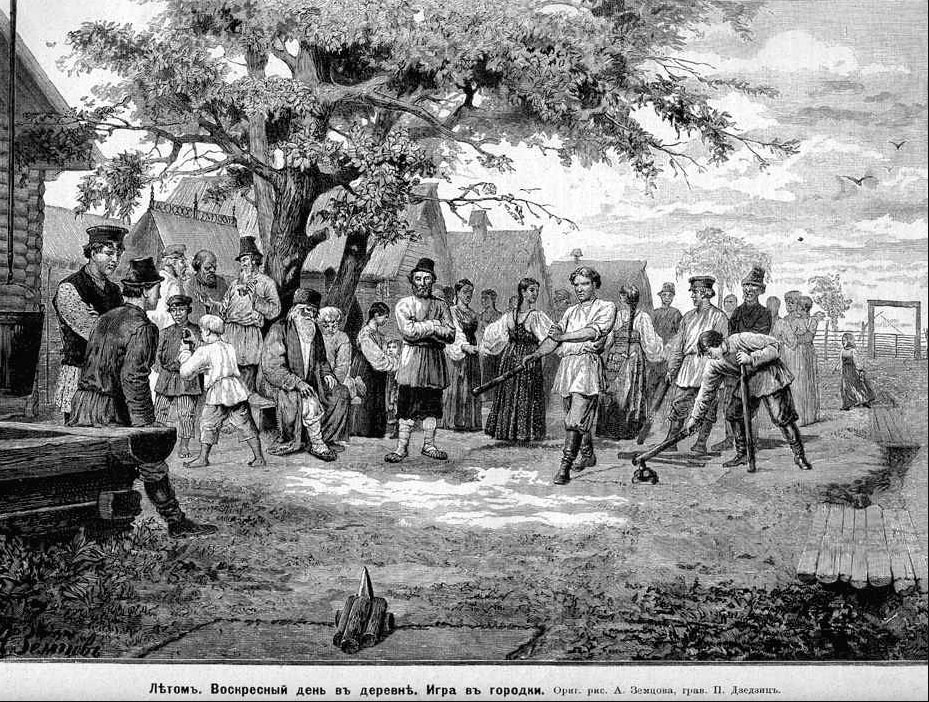
Men playing gorodki

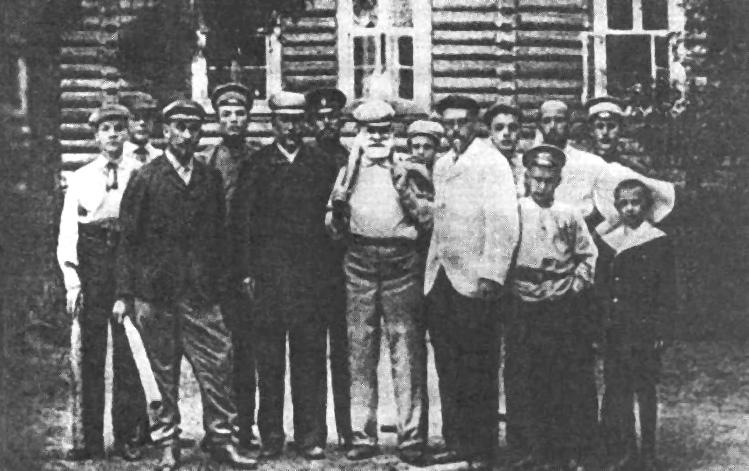
At the dacha in Sillamyagi after playing gorodki. In the centre is Ivan Pavlov

Although traditionally gorodki is a folk game, it was played by Russian historical figures such as Peter I, Alexander Suvorov, Vladimir Lenin, and Joseph Stalin, as well as cultural luminaries like Ivan Pavlov, Leo Tolstoy, Maksim Gorky, Nikolay Timofeev-Ressovsky, and others.

The game as it existed prior to 1923 had no rules per se. It was organized into a legitimate sport and its rules codified in 1923, when the first all-Union competition was held, and it became an event at the first all-Union Olympiad in 1928.

== Popular culture ==
The game was shown in an episode of the Soviet animated series Nu, pogodi!. Additionally, gorodki was featured in the popular CBS reality show The Amazing Race 17, episode 7, during a Roadblock challenge. The game was also featured on Schlag den Raab on 4 June 2011, and was a favorite childhood pastime of the eponymous protagonist of the novel Pnin by Vladimir Nabokov (p. 106, Vintage). The game can be played on the Wii game system through the game disc REC ROOM released in 2009.

== See also ==
- Bowling
- Bunnock
- Finnish skittles
- Kubb
