= Kubb =

Swedish lawn game in which pieces of wood are used to knock down other pieces of wood

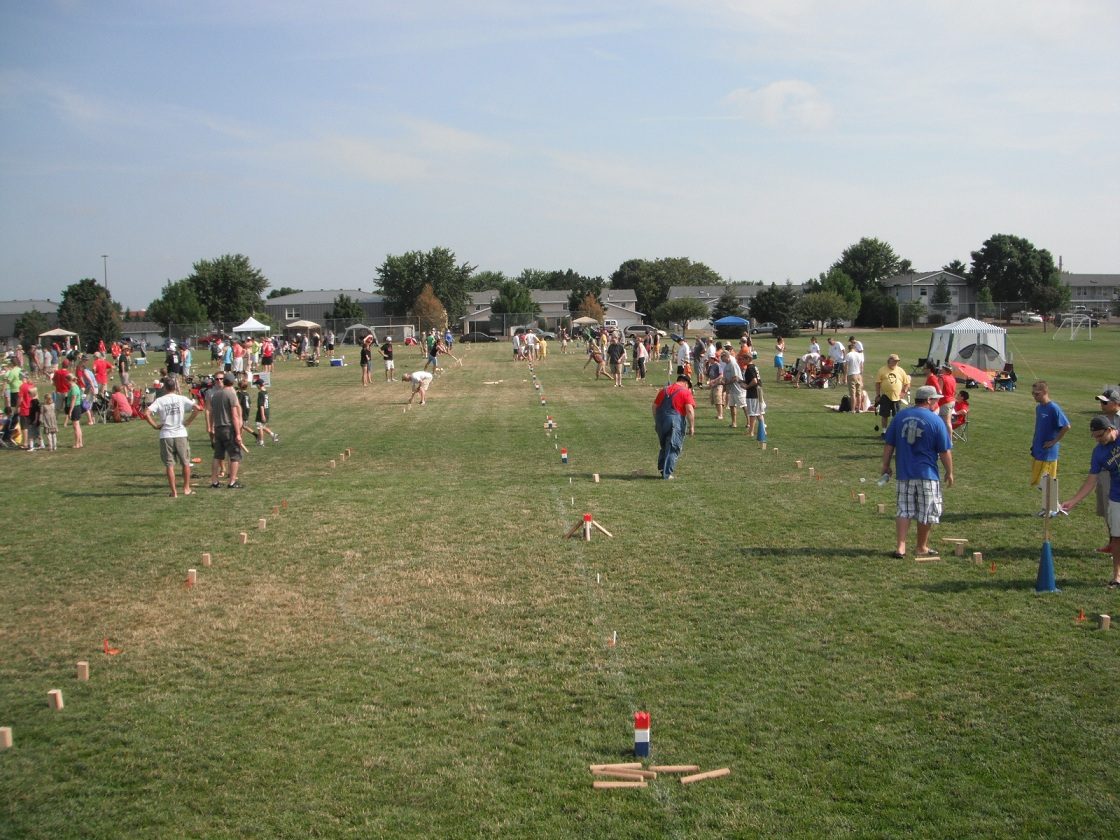
- 2012 US National Championship in Eau Claire, WI

Presence
- Olympic: No
- Paralympic: No

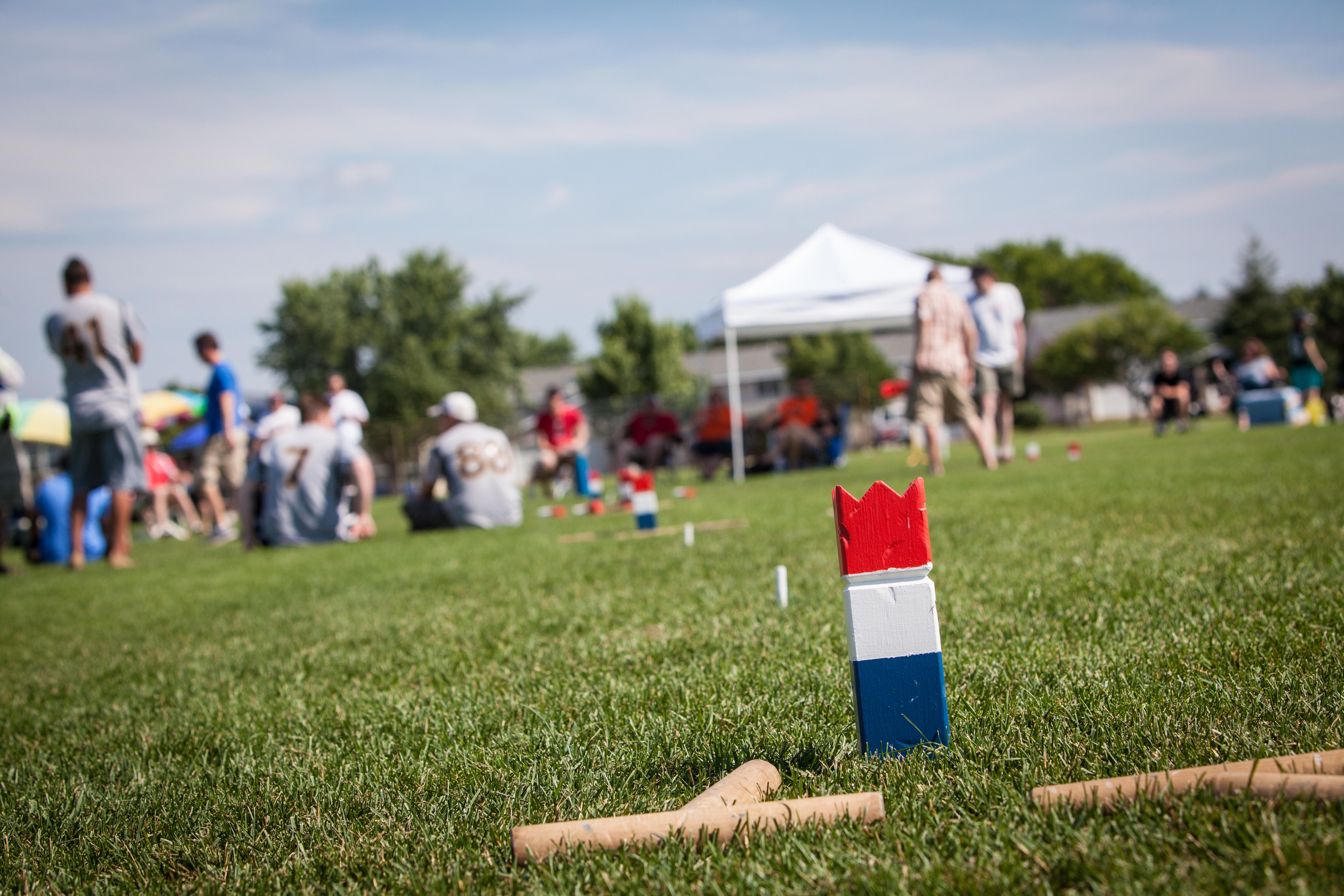
Kubb King on an unused pitch during final rounds of the 2013 USA Kubb National Championship

Kubb (pronounced [kɵbː] in Swedish and Gutnish) is a lawn game where the objective is to knock over wooden blocks (kubbar) by throwing wooden batons (kastpinnar) at them. Kubb can be described as a combination of bowling and horseshoes. Play takes place on a small rectangular playing field, known as a "pitch". "Kubbs" are placed at both ends of the pitch, and the "king", a larger wooden block, is placed in the middle of the pitch. Some rules vary from country to country and from region to region, but the ultimate objective of the game is to knock over the "kubbs" on the opposing side of the pitch, and then to knock over the "king", before the opponent does. Games can last from five minutes to well over an hour. The game can be played on a variety of surfaces such as grass, sand, concrete, snow, or even ice.

== History ==
=== Possible forebears ===
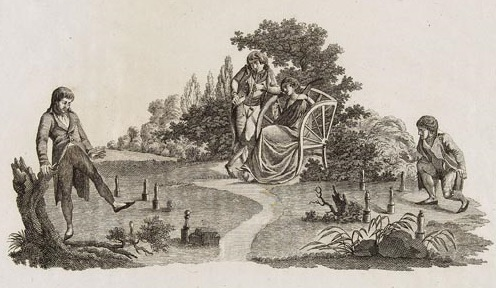
Boys playing the game kaisers with—the author insists—the wrong pins

The features of kubb most distinguishing it from other pin-toppling games (such as bowling and skittles) are that 1) teams "own" opposite sides of the playing field, and 2) toppled pins are "recycled" back into play and may be tossed to opposite sides. Endrei & Zolnay briefly note an unnamed game, (Note: "Eight persons each a side played, setting up twelve [pins] each on their own area, and bombing those of the opponent with bowls. But [pins] knocked down could in turn be used as missiles, and the team which last had one upright [pin] left won.") played in Poland "as early as the sixteenth century", which seems to exhibit both features.

Though differing from kubb in detail, kaisers, (Note: "Kaisers In this game of skittles, in which either two people or two parties take part, the nine pins are divided [between sides]. ¶ The person or party that gets only four pins by lot gets the king [pin] and the right of first toss. ¶ The pins can be placed wherever each side desires, including placement such that you can only reach them by throwing the ball and not by rolling it; but [the pins] must not be placed out of sight of the other side. ¶ If he who was awarded only four pins and the first toss hits one of the pins of the other party with his thrown or rolled ball, the latter is obliged to throw the knocked-over pin to the opposing party, who must stand it up on the same place upon which it fell. ¶ If the person who threw this pin over succeeds in knocking down another of the opposing party, it is their duty to throw that hit pin to the opponent. ¶ Play continues in this way until one side has not a single pin left. ¶ Finally, we note that everyone who is to toss must stand behind their pins, and not (the more easily to reach a pin that the opponent placed rather far away) step in front of his [own pins]. Do not be misled by the error of the draftsman or engraver, who gave the game ten skittles, several with a distinct form: rather, use eight common skittles and one king [pin] for this game.") as published in Leipzig in 1800, displays most of the fundamental features of kubb, including team sides, recycled pins, a kingpin, and even the requirement to throw from behind one's own pins; though as in the Polish game, the main projectile is a ball rather than a baton.

The Karelian game kyykkä and the possibly Siberian game bunnock both feature team sides and (unlike the Polish game and kaisers) use versions of batons as projectiles rather than balls.

Though typologically related to kubb, no definite historical connection between these games and kubb has been shown.

=== Norway ===
Known as kilkasting, variations of kubb have been used as children's play and for juvenile competitions. It is known and described from the mid 19th century.

=== Sweden ===
Sören Wallin has identified the Swedish game kägelkrig (as described in a 1911 encyclopedia) as essentially the same as, and the forebear of, kubb. This game was known on the Swedish mainland at least as early as 1878, when it was described in Ungdomens Bok, a sort of Boys' Own Book. (Note: "Kägelkrig ("Skittles War") The players divide into two teams. Each team has four pins, lined up opposite each other. [Player] number 1 of the first team throws the ball, attempting to hit any of the opponent team's pins. If successful, [player] number 1 of the second team throws not only the ball, but also the felled pin, over to the first team, seeking with it to fell some pins. The pin is thrown first; it, as well as any pins it knocks over, must be raised where they lie, before the ball is thrown. The pins hit by the ball are thrown back again, as just described. Once a team has lost all its pins, it acquires possession of the king [pin], and if it too is felled by the ball, the game is lost. The game is best suited for only two; nevertheless, several may play.")

Kägelkrig, the Polish game, and kaisers all seem to feature felled pins being thrown to the opponent side in order themselves to fell opponent pins, which is not a feature of contemporary kubb.

==== Gotland ====
Kubb was evidently unknown in Gotland in 1912, when a list of traditional Gotlandic games was drawn up, in conjunction with the Olympic Games (held in Stockholm that year). However, in 1931 a Gotlandic ethnologist, visiting the island of Fårö, just to the north of Gotland, recorded the earliest known use of the name "kubb" for this game, and it was played by residents of Gotland by at least the mid-20th century.

In the 1980s it became a local craze, leading to the first local commercial manufacturing efforts in the late 1980s. In 1995 a tournament was initiated in Rone, Gotland — the Kubb World Championship — somewhat ironically titled, as it was at this time still a thoroughly local affair. However, within only a few years, mainland and international teams were coming to Gotland to compete, and a major Swedish manufacturer was selling Kubb sets; in the 2000s Kubb spread to several European countries, as well as the USA and Canada. Large kubb tournaments now occur throughout Europe and the United States of America. Belgium alone held over 50 tournaments in 2012.

The Kubb World Championship takes place at the same time as "Medieval Week" in Visby (which has been "the island's main tourist magnet since the mid 1980s"). Medieval Week also incorporated the playing of kubb, and this connection has likely motivated kubb's being marketed, both in the US and in Europe, with such unfounded appellations as "Viking Chess" and "Old Norse Viking outdoor game".

=== United Kingdom ===
UK Kubb, the national body for Kubb in the UK, was founded in 2006 by two enthusiasts, one of whom had learned the game when on holiday in Sweden. They organised a UK Kubb Championship which has been run annually since that time. The championship rules are adapted from those of the US National Championship.

== Game pieces ==
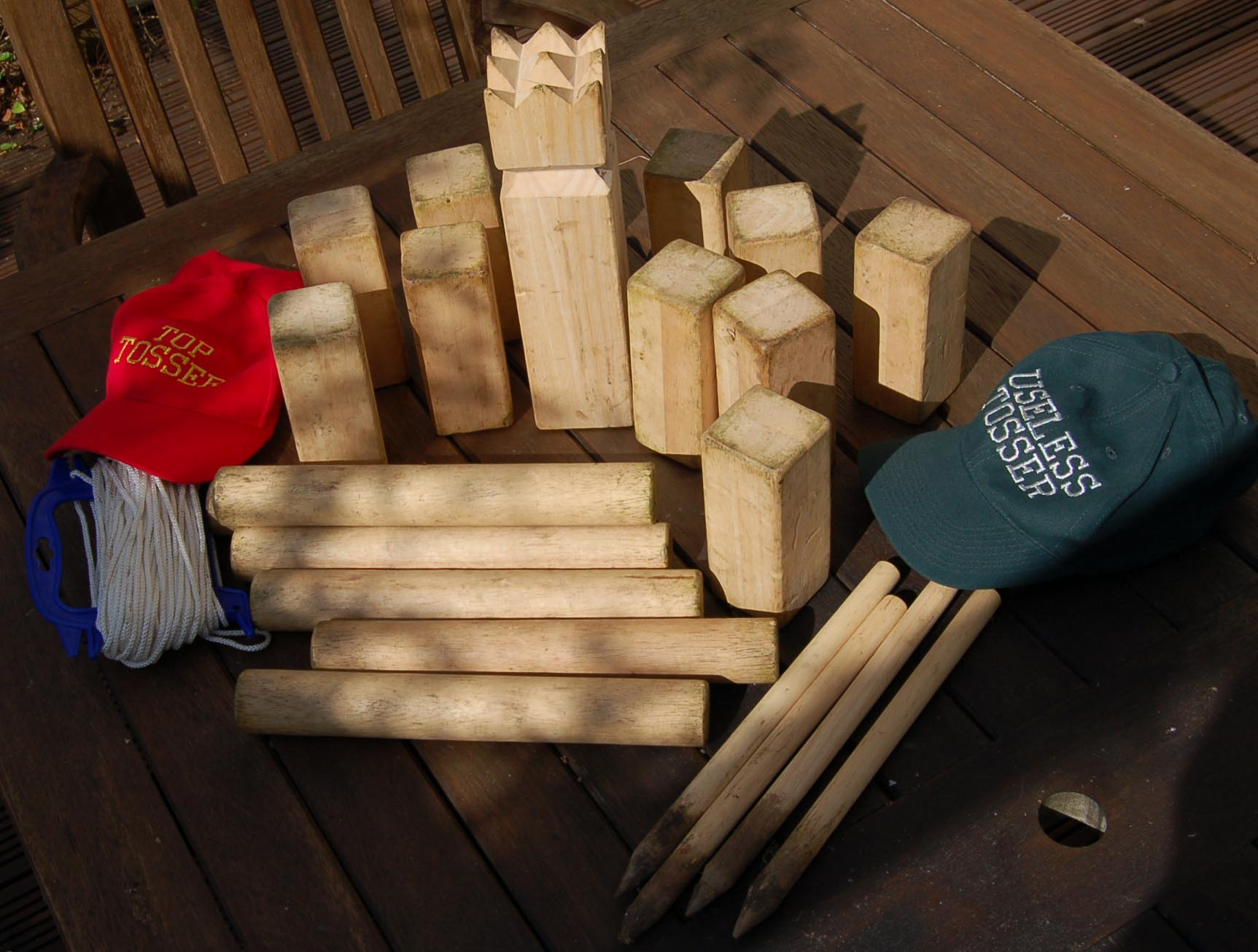
A typical set

Twenty-one or twenty-three game pieces are used in kubb:

- Ten kubbs, rectangular wooden blocks 10–15 cm tall and 5–7 cm square on the end.
- One king, a larger wooden piece 25–30 cm tall and 7–9 cm square on the end, sometimes adorned with a crown design on the top.
- Six batons, 25–30 cm long and 2.5–4.4 cm in diameter.
- Four or six field marking pins, four to designate the corners of the pitch, and, if there are six, two to mark the centreline.

== Setup ==
Dimensions of a Kubb pitch with four marking pins; one more may be placed at each end of the middle line

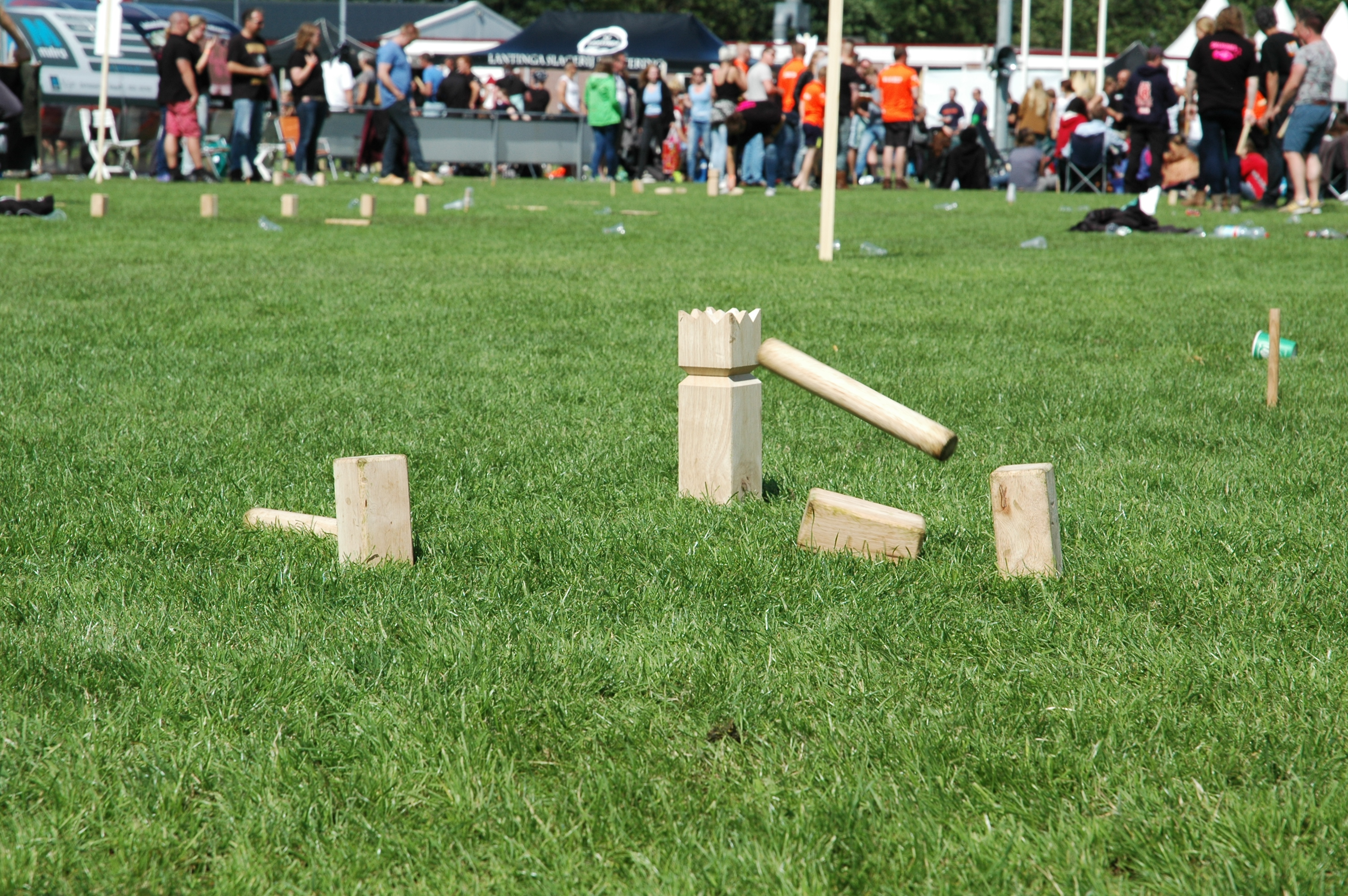
King and sticks in a traditional Kubb set at Dutch Championship

According to the US Championship rules and World Championship rules, kubb is played on a rectangular pitch 5 metres by 8 metres. Corner stakes are placed so that a rectangle is formed. The center stakes are placed in the middle of the sidelines (long edges of the rectangle), which divides the pitch into two halves. No other markers are required to demarcate the field's boundaries, although markings that do not interfere with game play are allowed (such as chalk lines).

The king is placed upright in the center of the pitch, and the kubbs are placed on the baselines (short edges of the rectangle), five kubbs on each side equidistant from each other.

Kubbs starting the game on the baseline are referred to as base kubbs. The baseline should run through the center of the kubbs. For young children, the 8-meter pitch length can be shortened.

== Rulesets ==
The World Championship rules and the U.S. National Championship rules are the two official tournament rulesets available for kubb.

=== U.S. National Championship ruleset overview ===
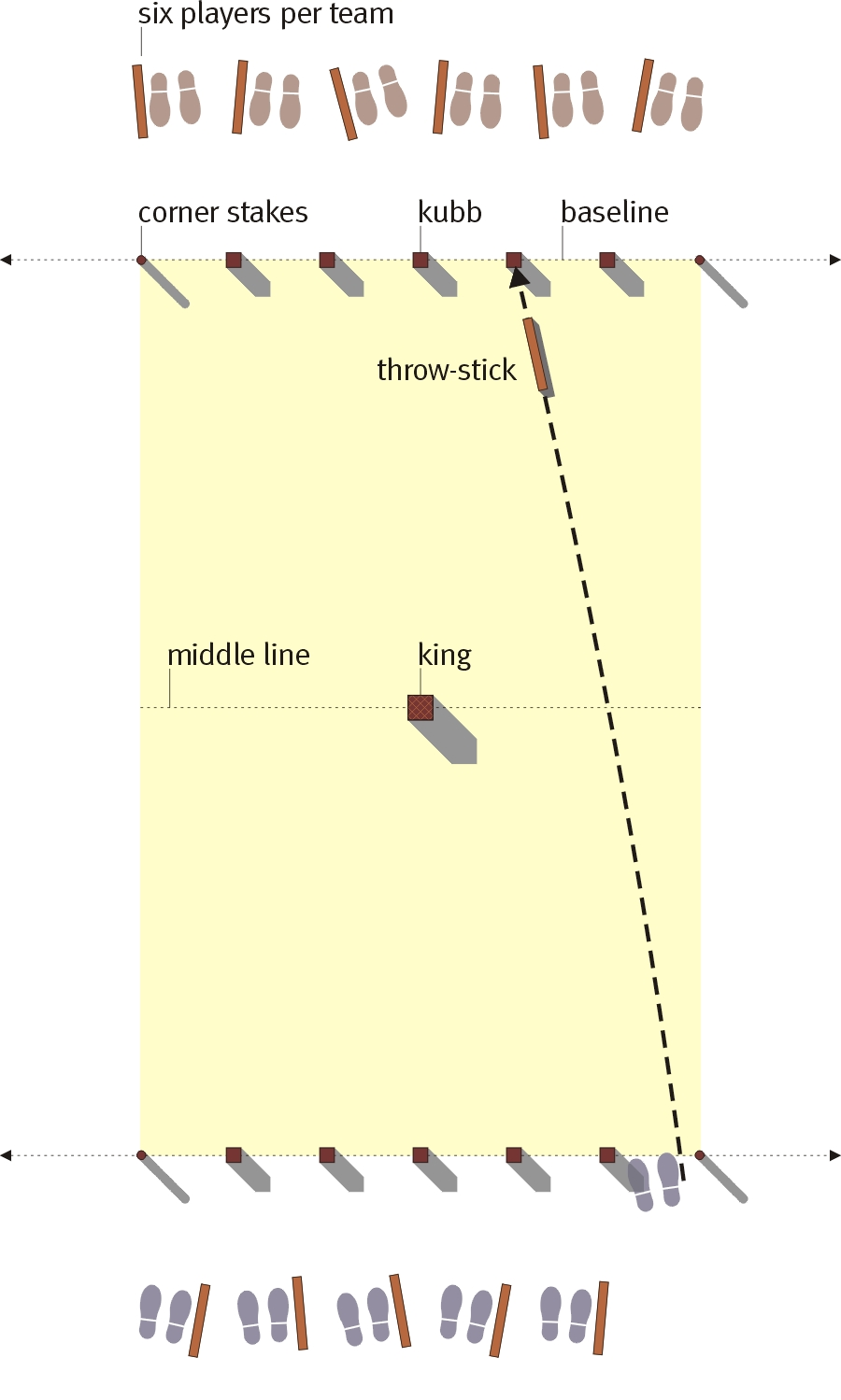
Kubb field setup

Kubb is played between two teams, which may or may not consist of only one person per team.

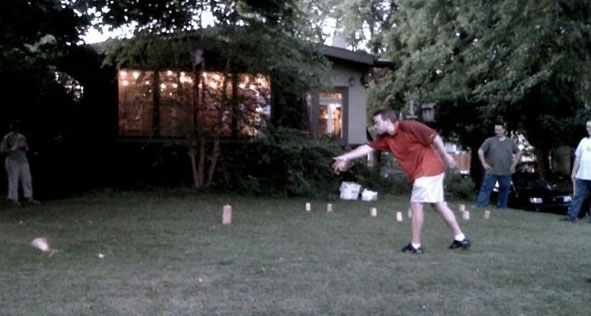
Kubb form demonstration at the 2009 Peterson Midwest Match

There are two phases for each team's turn:

1. Team A throws the six batons (called Kastpinne/Kastpinnar in Swedish) from their baseline, at their opponent's lined-up kubbs (called baseline kubbs). Throws must be under-handed, and, if the batons spin, they must spin end over end at no more than 45 degrees from the vertical. Throwing batons overhand, sideways or spinning them side-to-side (like a helicopter) is not allowed.
2. Kubbs that are successfully knocked down by Team A are then thrown by Team B onto Team A's half of the pitch, and stood on end. These newly thrown kubbs are called field kubbs. The key objective is to keep them close to each other (as to be able to hit more than one with a single throw of the batons (Kastpinnar)). The player that tosses the kubbs is called the inkastare.

If a kubb is thrown out of play, i.e., outside the boundary markers or not beyond the middle line (Note: after being raised, at least half of the kubb must be in the field of play to be considered in play), then one more attempt is given. If this also goes out, the kubb becomes a "punishment kubb" and can be placed anywhere in the target half by the opposing team as long as it is at least one baton length from a corner marker or the King. If a thrown kubb knocks over an existing baseline or field kubb, then the field kubbs are raised at the location where they rest, and baseline kubbs are raised at their original location.

Play then changes hands, and Team B throws the batons at Team A's kubbs, but must first knock down any standing field kubbs. If a baseline kubb is knocked down before all remaining field kubbs, the baseline kubb is returned to its upright position. (Field kubbs that right themselves due to the momentum of the impact are considered knocked down. Kubbs are considered knocked down if they end up tilting and relying on a game piece for support.) Again, all kubbs that are knocked down are thrown back over onto the opposite half of the field and then stood up.

If either team does not knock down all field kubbs before their turn is over, the kubb closest to the centerline now represents the opposite team's baseline, and throwers may step up to that line to throw at their opponent's kubbs. This rule applies only to throwing the batons at the opposing team's field and baseline kubbs; fallen kubbs are thrown from the original baseline, as are attempts to knock over the king (see below).

Play continues in this fashion until a team is able to knock down all kubbs on the opposing team's half of the field. If the former team still has batons left to throw, they now attempt to knock over the king. If a thrower successfully topples the king, their team has won the game.

If at any time during the game the king is knocked down by a baton or kubb while the opposing team still has kubbs in its half of the field, the throwing team immediately loses the game.

In tournaments, winners are typically determined by playing best out of three.

For informal play between players of widely differing abilities, such as an adult and a child, it is permissible to shorten the length of the pitch. Another option is for both players to play on the same team and keep switching sides during play.

== Tournaments ==
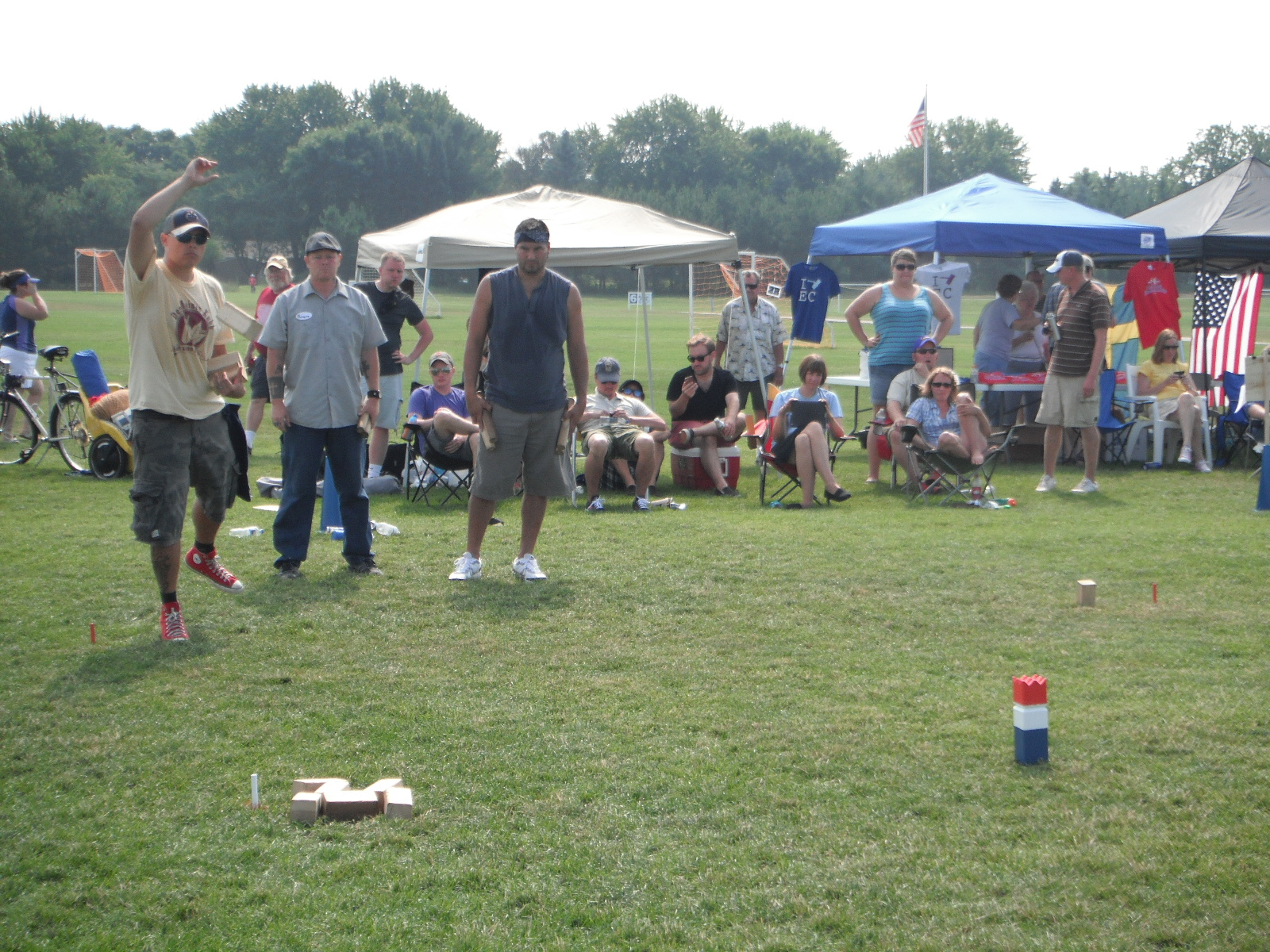
Team participating in a kubb tournament. The player is throwing (inkasting) the kubbs back into the field.

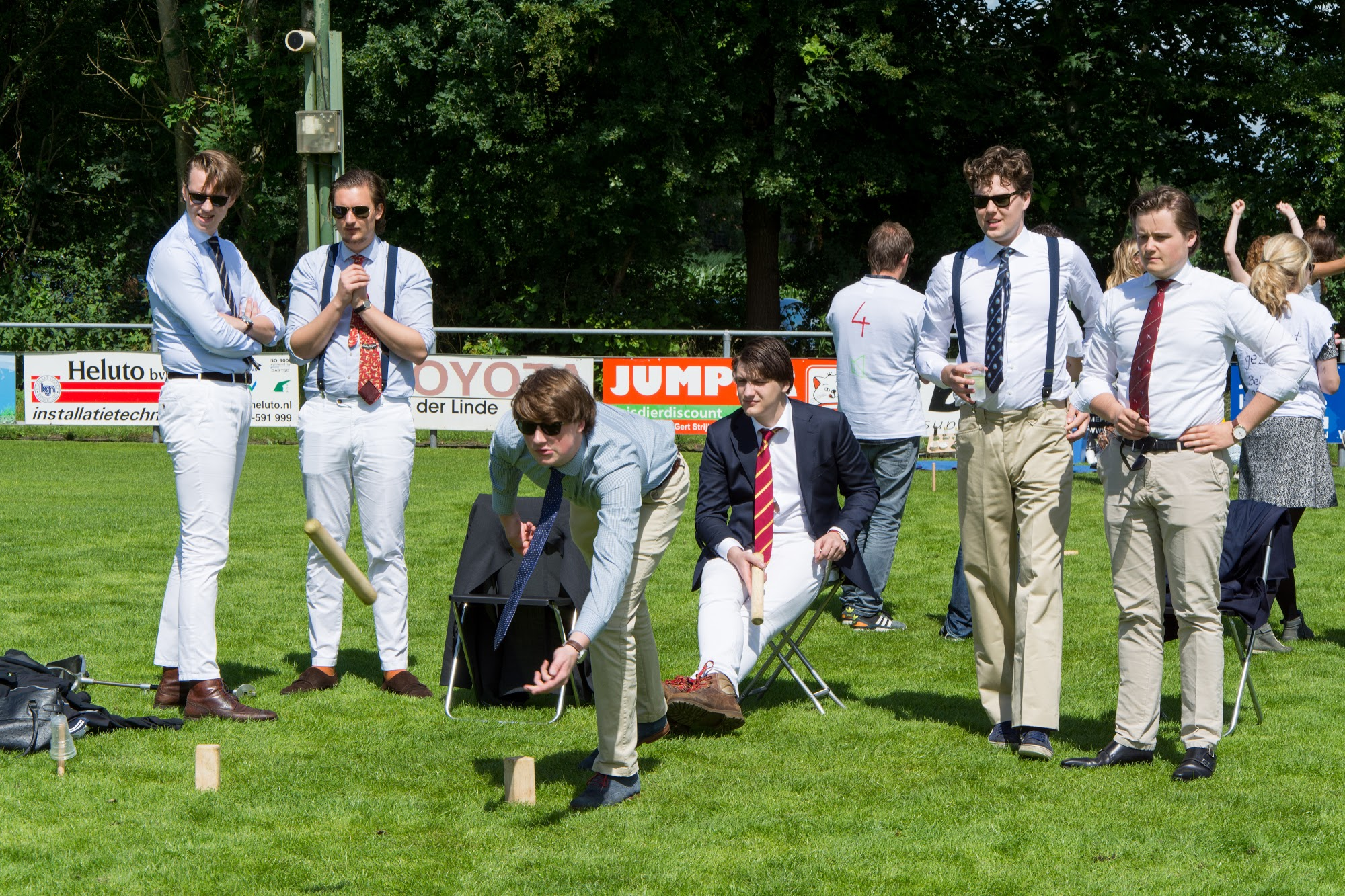
Dutch Kubb-team Jan-Diederick en de Ravenvangers at the 2016 Dutch Championship.

The Kubb World Championship is held annually on the island of Gotland, Sweden. The U.S. Championship is held annually in Eau Claire, Wisconsin.

Tournaments in the U.S. have exploded since 2007, especially in the Midwest. In 2016, the U.S. tournament list includes over 40 tournaments. The majority of tournaments are located in Minnesota and Wisconsin.

In 2013, the U.S. Midwest Championship was re-introduced. The annual tournament travels throughout the Midwest. (2013: Rockford, IL; 2014: Decorah, IA; 2015: Madison, WI; 2016: Madison, WI; 2017: Shakopee, MN; 2018: Canton, OH)

European tournaments are held in Sweden, Germany, Switzerland, Belgium, the Netherlands, Czech Republic, the UK and Italy. Most countries have their own national championship tournament.

== See also ==
- Bowling
- Bunnock
- Finnish skittles
- Gorodki
