= Finnish skittles =

Finnish throwing game

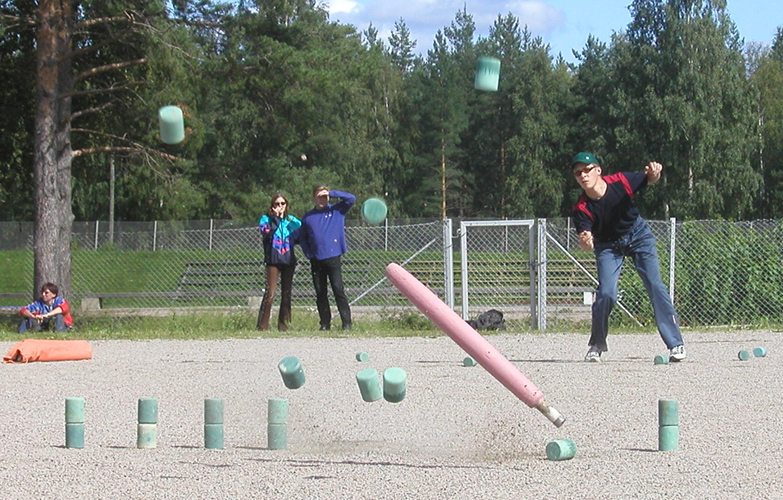
The Finnish Champion in men's individual game in 2007, Mika Peiponen (Nurmes Skittles Club), playing in Finnish Championships in Äänekoski, 2003.

Finnish skittles, also known as Karelian skittles, outdoor skittles or kyykkä, is a centuries-old game of Karelian origin. The aim in Finnish skittles is to throw wooden skittle bats at skittles, trying to remove them from the play square using as few throws as possible. Skittles can be played with four-person teams, in pairs or as an individual game. Finnish skittles is one of the three skittles games played in the World Championships of Gorodki Sport. The other games include Classic Gorodki and Euro Gorodki.

== History ==
In 1894, a Finnish author and photographer I. K. Inha wrote in his diaries concerning his journey to White Karelia, that the game he had discovered was almost extinct and it was only played in remote villages. In Karelia around lake Ladoga people knew about the game in Suojarvi and Salmi, but even there it was only played in remote villages. The game was also known in Karelian Isthmus and Ingria areas.

After the kinship wars the people that had migrated into Finland played skittles during their Karelian summer festivals.

In 1951 there was a movement to revitalise Finnish skittles with the approval of President Urho Kekkonen. A set of rules and a scoring system were created, taking into account the traditional Karelian skittles terms and rules.

Karelian Skittles Association was registered in 1986. Later on, the name was changed to Finnish Skittles Association in 1993. Finnish Skittles Association is a member of Finnish Sports Federation SLU (Suomen Liikunta ja Urheilu), a non-governmental sports federation for over one million Finns.

The chairman of Finnish Skittles Association is Jyrki Juvonen.

== Competition history ==
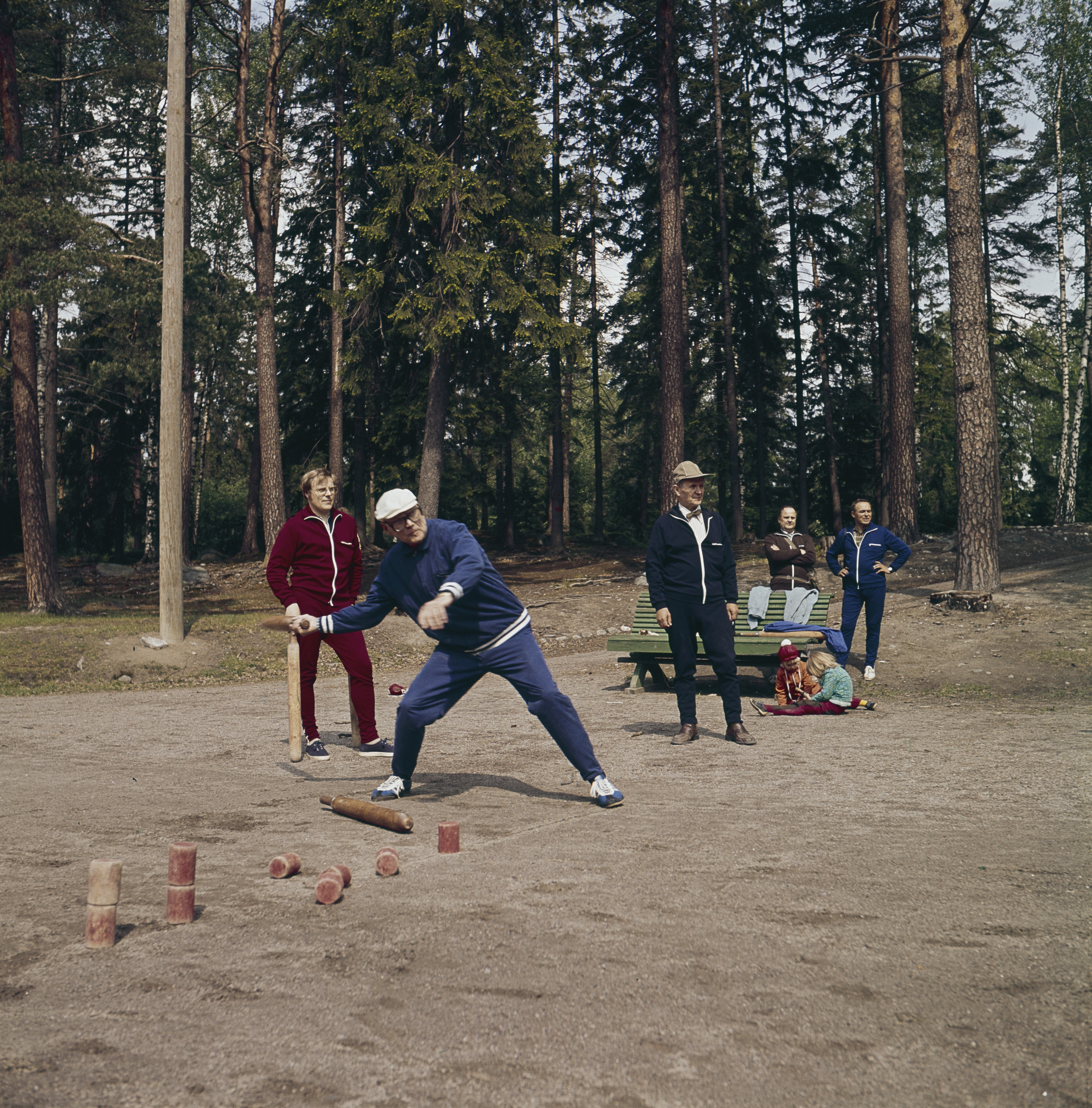
President of Finland Urho Kekkonen playing kyykkä (Finnish skittles) in Seurasaari in 1974

Men's team event was the first form of competitive skittles in Finland. During 1951–1961 the Finnish championships for men's team event were held in Seurasaari, Helsinki. Since 1961 the games have been held together with the Karelian summer festivals around Finland. Men's individual event was added to the curriculum in 1954, but the first championship medals were given in 1964, when the sport was officially given a championship status. In 1971, the first Finnish championship medals for veterans individual event were given. At the end of the 1980s, a new form of play was introduced, as the first Finnish Championship for individual pentathlon was held. The latest addition in Finnish Skittles is men's pairs event in 2005.

The first individual championships for women were held in 1973 and women's pairs event in 1980.

== Finnish skittles today ==
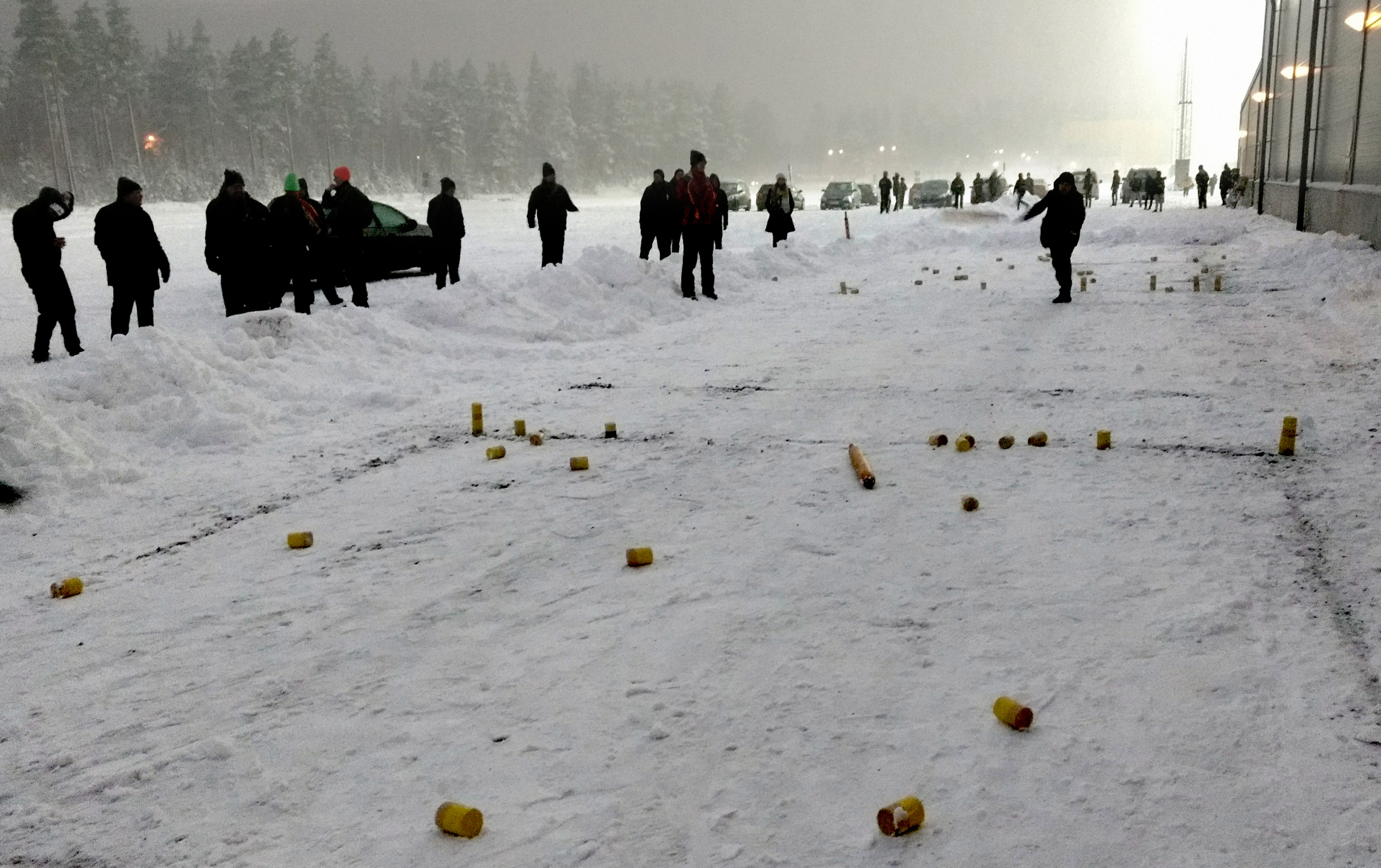
Finnish skittles playing at Lappeenranta

From May till October, the member clubs of the Finnish Skittles Association hold national tournaments (around 20–30 tournaments), regional championship tournaments and local club tournaments around Finland.

As for skittles Finnish championships, there are tournaments for men's team event and women's pairs event, individual pentathlon, men's and men's veterans (aged 60 or older) pairs event, as well as for individual event for men, women, veterans and juniors. Moreover, there are indoor championships during the winter for men's team event, women's pairs event and individual games.

In order to be able to compete on the top level for Finnish Championship medals, players need to achieve at least two championship scores during the previous season (+22 for men, +15 for women).

Every year there are also Nordic Championships held either in Finland or Sweden, including e.g. a national match between Sweden and Finland. Finnish Skittles is mainly played in Finland, although there are half a dozen Swedish skittles clubs, one strong club in Estonia and some activity in Russia. The third world championships in Finnish Skittles were held in Karlsruhe, Germany in 2006. The fourth world championships were held in Maladzyechna, Belarus, on July 31 – August 6, 2009. In addition to Finnish skittles, two versions of Russian gorodki were also played in the championships. Finland stroke gold in men's team event, women's pairs and in mixed pairs. In men's individual game Finns filled all podium places and women took gold and silver. In 2011 the world championships were held in Saint Petersburg, Russia. In 2013, European championships for individual games were held in Loksa, Estonia.

During summertime skittles is being played on a hard gravel field, which is the official surface for the game. During wintertime the games are held indoors on gravel, but the game can also be played outside on packed snow or ice (e.g. on parking lots or frozen lakes).

There is much activity outside Finnish Skittles Association during wintertime, especially in universities. In February, one of the biggest student tournaments in Finland, Academic Skittles World Championships, is held on the parking lots of Tampere University of Technology. Despite the name, the tournament does not hold an official world championship status. Winter skittles is also played a lot in Lappeenranta University of Technology, as well as in University of Oulu.

== Skittles terms ==
Crone
a skittle worth two points inside the playing square or on the front line of the playing square.
Priest
a skittle worth one point on the back- or sideline of the playing square.
Intruder
a skittle worth two points, that has moved into the front of the playing square.
Kona
a line of skittles on the front line, formed by building two skittles tall towers.
Miss
a throw that does not remove any skittles from the playing square. The thrown can either miss all the skittles totally or hit and move them inside the square.
Pike
(named after the fish) Student slang for a throw that totally misses all the skittles.
Tower
slang for a pair of skittles in a form of a tower, where one skittle is on top of another.

== Skittles individual game records ==
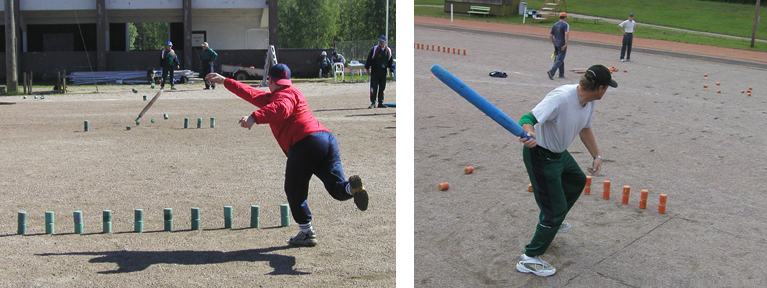
Left: Veli-Pekka Juvonen playing individual skittles in Äänekoski, 2002. Right: Esko Rautiainen playing in a team event in Imatra, 2003.

Men: +30

- Harri Kanto, Janakkala Skittles Club (1991, 1993)
- Harri Aaltonen, Janakkala Skittles Club (1992)
- Esko Rautiainen, Kuopio Skittles Club (2000)
- Veli-Pekka Juvonen, Imatra Skittles (2003)
- Marko Peiponen, Nurmes Skittles Club (2009)
- Veli-Pekka Ehoniemi, Helsinki Suojärvi Club (2011, 2017)
- Reima Peiponen, Nurmes Skittles Club (2013)
- Lauri Hokkinen, Tammer-Kyykkä (2017)

Women: +28

- Päivi Ruotsalainen, Orivesi Karelia Club (2011)

== Skittles short rules ==
=== Short rules ===
Outdoor skittles is played on a gravel surface which should be as even as possible. The playing field, including fringes, measures about 7 by 22 metres (23 ft × 72 ft). The field is composed of two playing squares and an area dividing the field into two. The home team's throwing square is the playing square of the opponent. The playing square measures 5 by 5 metres (16 ft × 16 ft) and the area between the squares is 10 metres (33 ft). Playing squares for children under 10 years measure 3 by 3 metres (9.8 ft × 9.8 ft) and the area between the squares is 6 metres (20 ft).

=== Skittles ===
The skittles are wooden cylinders rounded at the corners, with a height of 100 millimetres (3.9 in) and a diameter of 70–75 millimetres (2.8–3.0 in). At the beginning of the game, pairs of skittles are placed on the front line of the playing square. In team games, 20 pairs of skittles are placed at intervals, with 10-centimetre (3.9 in) margins. In individual games, 10 pairs of skittles are similarly placed, with 125-centimetre (49 in) margins. On a small playing field, the distance from the side line is 25 centimetres (9.8 in).

=== Bats ===
The bats are made of wood, rounded and equipped with handles. The maximum length of the bat is 850 millimetres (33 in) and its maximum thickness is 80 millimetres (3.1 in). There are no limitations for its weight.

=== Throwing distances ===
Boys and girls under 8 years make their opening and continuing throws in the playing square from a 4-metre (13 ft) distance (field 3 × 3 m, intermediate area 6 m). Boys and girls under 10 years make their opening throw from 6 m and continue throwing from 4 m. Boys and girls under 12 years make their opening throw from 8 m (field 5 × 5 m, intermediate area 10 m) and continue throwing from 6 m. Boys and girls under 15 years make their opening throw from 10 m and continue throwing from 8 metres (26 ft).

Women make their opening throw in the playing square from a 10-m distance and continue throwing from 8 m. Veteran women over 70 years make their opening and continuing throws from 8 m.

Men make their opening throw in the playing square from a 15-metre (49 ft) distance and continue throwing from 10 m. Veteran men over 70 years make their opening and continuing throws from 10 m. In team and pair games, 70-year-olds may open the play from the sides only when the other team members have not been able to knock any skittles out of the playing square.

=== Progress of the game ===
Skittles can be played with four-person teams, in pairs or as an individual game. In team and pair games, the players have two bats at their disposal. In individual games, four bats can be used per turn.

Each player in his turn steps up to the throwing square and by throwing the bat tries to knock the skittles out of the playing square. Skittles thrown out or unused bats yield points; skittles remaining in the playing square or between the playing squares yield minus points.

Skittles remaining in the playing square (crones) yield two minus points; skittles remaining on the lines (priests) yield one minus point, and unused bats yield one point.

The first half ends when either team or pair clears its playing square from skittles. The opponent may throw the same number of bats per half. After this, sides are changed, and the second half is played like the first one. The team with the highest total score is the winner. The winner is awarded two points for the victory. When the play ends in a tie, both teams receive one point. A defeat gives 0 points.

In individual games, 20 bats per half may be used. The first player throws four bats, whereafter the turn goes to the opponent, and after four bats, back again. The result of the player equals the number of unused bats (1 point per bat). When there are no skittles on the field, sides are changed and the second half is played like the first one. The final score of the player is the total result of both halves.

== See also ==
- Skittles (sport)
- Gorodki, Russian skittles, originates from the same game as Finnish Skittles and it is played in the same World Championships. The game variants include Classic Gorodki and Euro Gorodki.
- Washers
- Kubb
- Mölkky, a game where the idea is to topple the skittles, instead of removing them from the area.
