= Mölkky =

Finnish throwing game

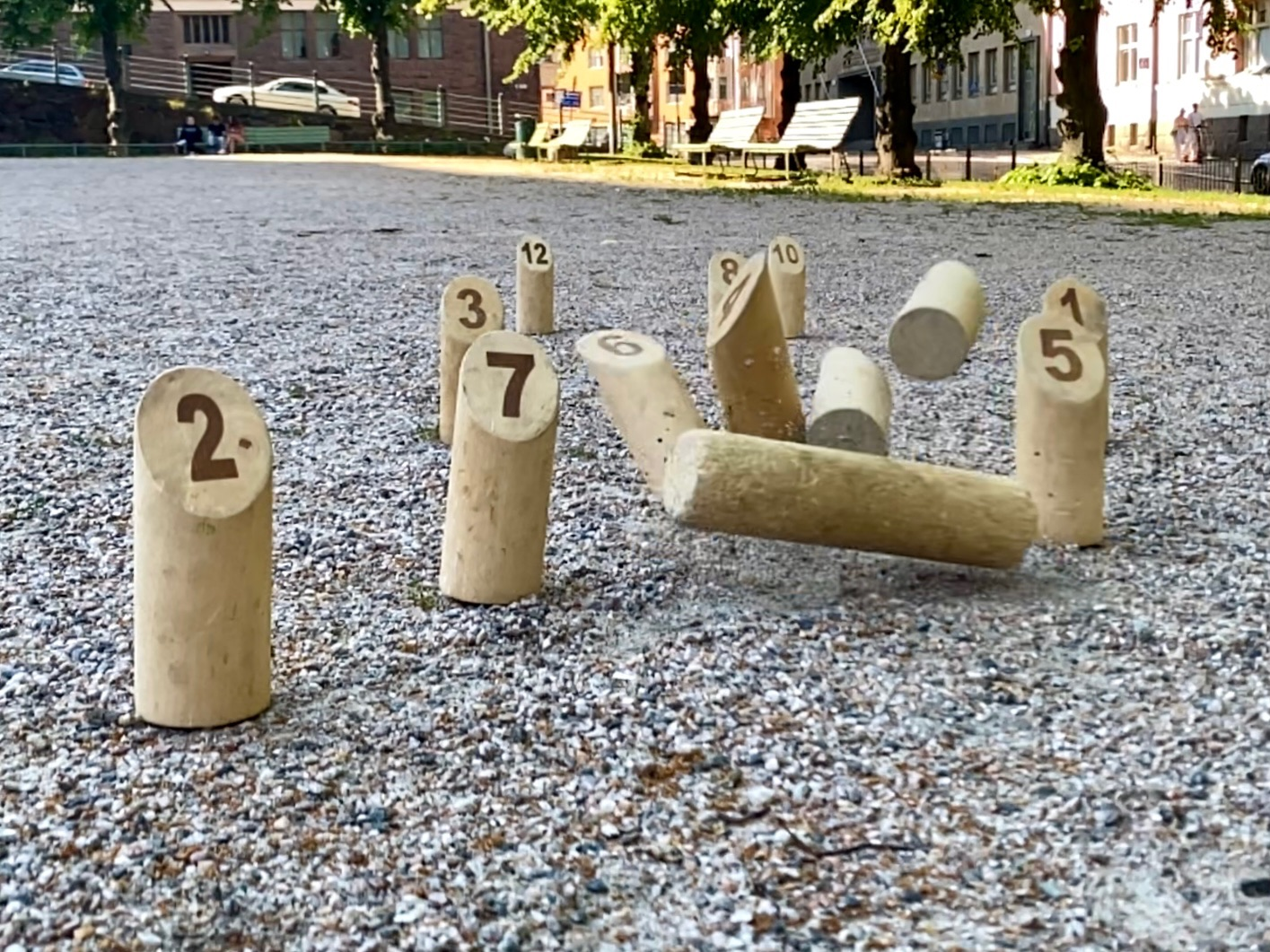
Throwing pin hitting four smaller pins.

Mölkky (Finnish pronunciation: [ˈmølkːy]) is a Finnish throwing game invented by Lahden Paikka company (formerly known as Tuoterengas) in 1996. It is reminiscent of kyykkä, a centuries-old throwing game with Karelian roots. However, Mölkky does not require as much physical strength as kyykkä, and is more suitable for everyone regardless of age and condition. Success in Mölkky is based on a combination of chance and skill. Lahden Paikka has sold nearly 200,000 sets in Finland.

In 2016 Lahden Paikka sold all rights of Mölkky, games production and the trademark to Finnish company Tactic Games Oy. The name Mölkky is a protected trademark. All Mölkky games are manufactured in Pori, Finland.

== Rules ==
A set of Mölkky pins in the position they would be set up in at the start of a game

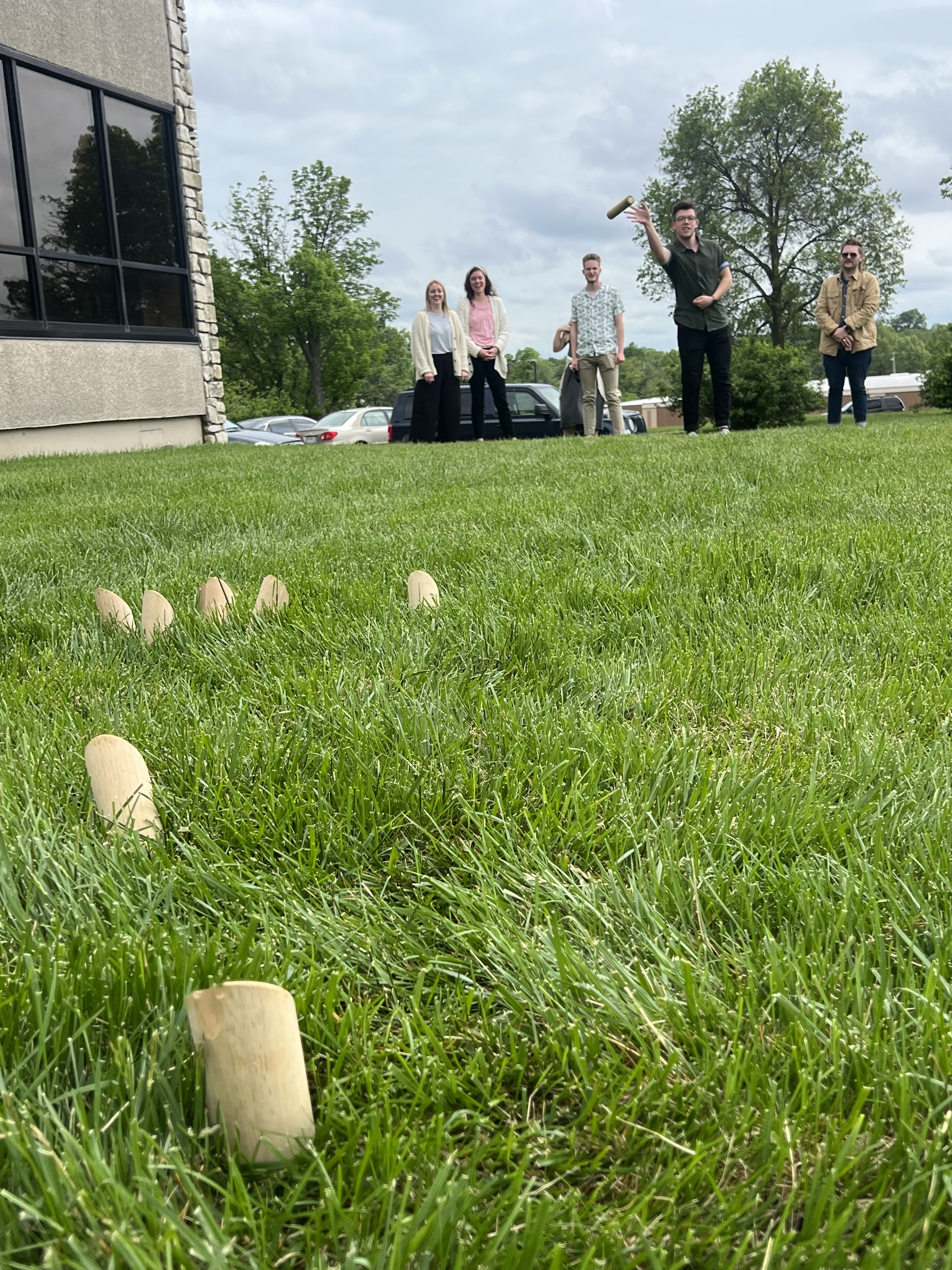
A casual game of Mölkky played on grass

The set consists of a throwing pin, and 12 shorter wooden pins (also called "skittles") numbered from 1 to 12. The pins are initially placed in a tight group in an upright position 3–4 meters away from the throwing line, with the pins organized as follows: 1st row, 1/2; 2nd row, 3/10/4; 3rd row, 5/11/12/6; 4th row, 7/9/8. The players take turns to toss the throwing pin to try and knock over the numbered pins.

Knocking over one pin scores the number of points marked on the pin, but knocking 2 or more pins scores only the number of pins knocked over (e.g., knocking over any 3 pins scores 3 points). A pin only counts if lying flat on the ground, not leaning on another pin (including the throwing pin).

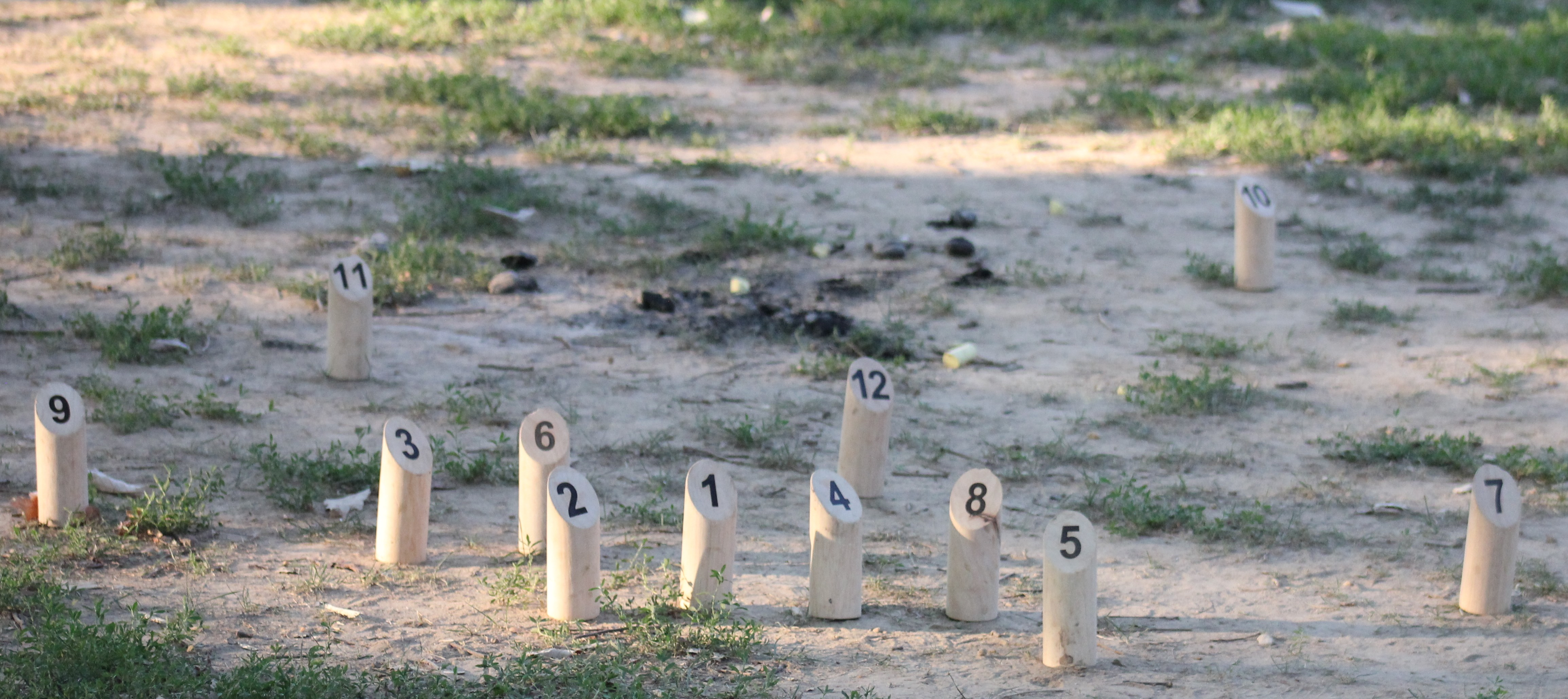
Mölkky pins midway through a game, having been scattered and stood back up several times

After each throw, the pins are stood up again, not in the original position but where they landed. The first player to reach exactly 50 points wins the game, but scoring more than 50 is penalized by setting the player's score back to 25 points. A player is eliminated from the game if they miss all of the numbered pins three times in a row.

== Organizations and competitions ==
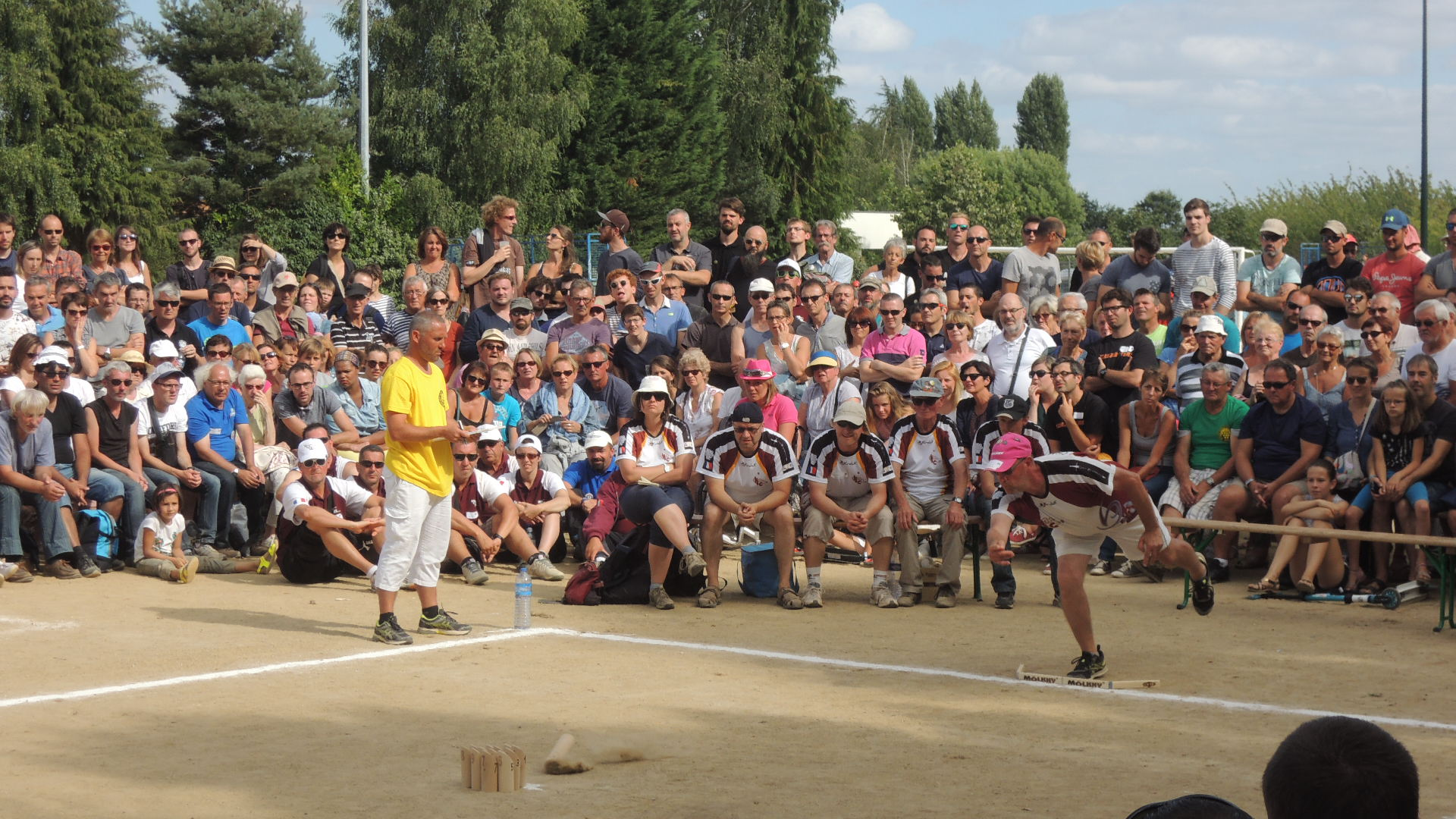
2016 Mölkky World Championship at Le Rheu, France

Mölkky players have started more than 250 Mölkky Associations. International Mölkky Organization is the umbrella organization for Mölkky associations. 26 countries are currently official members.

The Finnish championships for mölkky have been organised in Lahti since 1997 by the union of youth clubs in Southern Tavastia. The technology students in Tampere organised world championships in academic mölkky in 2001. The Finnish Mölkky Union has been formed to promote the game and its subculture.

The Mölkky World Championship in 2016 was the first Mölkky competition organised outside of Finland. The tournament was organized in Le Rheu, France. In 2017, it was organized in Prague in the Czech Republic, 2018 in Pori, Finland, 2019 in Samoëns, France and 2020 in Hyvinkää, Finland. In 2024, the competition was held in Hakodate, Japan.

In Australia the game is known by the trade-marked name 'Finska' (Swedish for Finn or Finland). The company Planet Finska both sells sets of the game and promotes competitions in Australia. The company was established by two friends who were introduced to the game by a Finnish friend in 2009. The first Australian Championships were held in 2010.

=== World champions ===
The results of the International Mölkky Organisation's world championship tournaments have been:

Year	World Champion	Country	Host City / Country
2026	Moon Prism Power	Japan	Helsinki, Finland
2025	EH	Finland	Gołotczyzna, Poland
2024	Akashi Molkky Club	Japan	Hakodate, Japan
2023	Team Lokki	Finland	Hyvinkää, Finland
2022	Team Lokki	Finland	Samoëns, France
2021	Cancelled		
2020	Cancelled		
2019	Cobra	Finland	Samoëns, France
2018	Janetzk1 DreamTeam	Finland	Pori, Finland
2017	Cobra Cska	Finland	Rakovník, Czech Republic
2016	Yatch	France	Le Rheu, France
2015	Vettynyt Halko	Finland	Lahti, Finland
2014	Pullistus	Finland	Lahti, Finland
2013	Wood Pub	Finland	Lahti, Finland
2012	France Team 1	France	Lahti, Finland
2011	Nassu	Finland	Lahti, Finland
2010	Konna & Koukku	Finland	Lahti, Finland
2009	Toka Janetzki	Finland	Lahti, Finland
2008	Möysän Mesut	Finland	Lahti, Finland
2007	Nassu	Finland	Lahti, Finland
2006	Mainospaita	Finland	Lahti, Finland
2005	Pirtin Tikka II	Finland	Lahti, Finland
2004	Team SS	Finland	Lahti, Finland
