= Tailgate party =

Social event around a vehicle

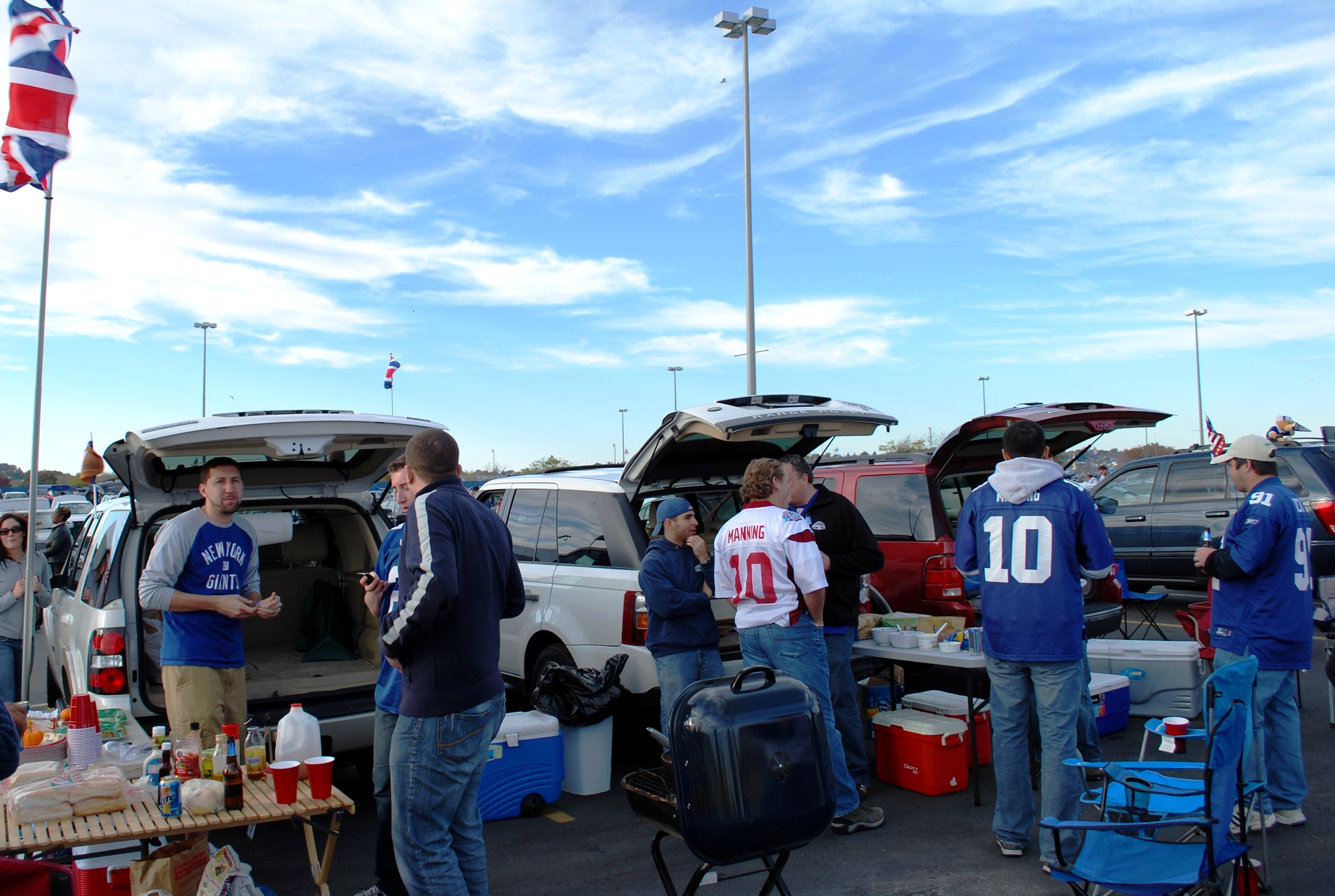
A tailgate party in 2009

A tailgate party is a social event held on and around the open tailgate of a vehicle. Tailgating, which primarily takes place in the United States and Canada, often involves consuming alcoholic beverages while barbecuing and grilling food.

Tailgate parties occur in the parking lots at stadiums and arenas, before and occasionally after games, festivals, and concerts. People attending such parties are said to be "tailgating". Many people participate even if their vehicles do not have tailgates. Tailgate parties also involve people bringing their own alcoholic beverages, barbecues, and food, which are sampled and shared among guests attending the tailgate. Tailgates are intended to be non-commercial events, so selling items to the fans is frowned upon and can even be considered illegal soliciting. Tailgating is often seen as a critical part of the sports experience in the United States. Because many American sports venues are surrounded by large parking lots, tailgating often takes place right outside stadium and arena entrances.

Tailgate parties have spread to the pre-game festivities at sporting events besides American and Canadian football, such as basketball, hockey, baseball and soccer. They also occur at non-sporting events such as weddings, cultural festivals and concerts. As American and Canadian football outside North America has copied many of its associated traditions from the National Football League (NFL), the Canadian Football League (CFL), and college football, tailgating parties are also held at some American football games in Europe. The term "tailgation" has been used to describe the collective of the party and those that identify with tailgate culture as a portmanteau of "tailgate nation".

== Food and drink ==
Tailgating typically involves the consumption of alcoholic beverages or soft drinks and the grilling of various meat products. Popular tailgate party foods include picnic and grilling staples such as bratwurst, hamburgers, hot dogs, buffalo wings, baked beans, steak, to-go pizza, sliders and cold salads like coleslaw or potato salad. Snacks include potato and tortilla chips with guacamole among others which are fairly common. Some food products were created because of tailgate parties. A brand of pimento cheese, called Palmetto Cheese, got its start at Atlanta Braves tailgate parties. In some Southern U.S. states and subtropical areas, fried seafood is made and shared at certain tailgate parties.

== Games ==
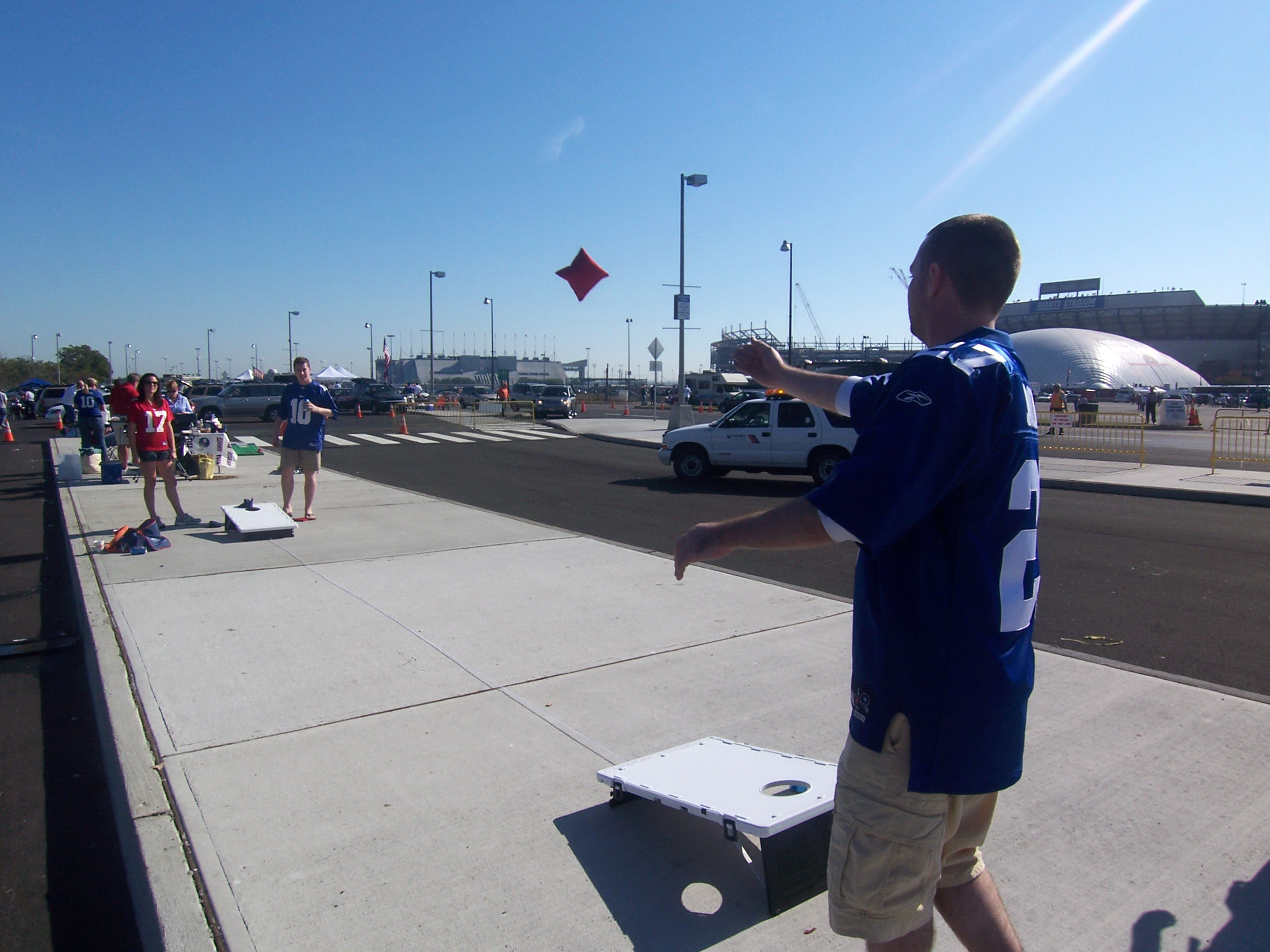
A game of cornhole

Lawn games such as KanJam, cornhole, ladder golf, Polish horseshoes, Louisville Chugger, Jarts, washer pitching and Sholf are very popular during tailgates and tailgate parties. Lawn games are associated with tailgating primarily because of the simplicity in the game materials. Lawn games carry the connotation of drinking games because of their presence during tailgates. Other games that are often played include beer pong and flipcup. It is also common for fans to bring sports balls such as footballs, soccer balls, and the like to casually play with. Many tailgaters have external stereos or use their car's sound system to play music, and it is not unusual to see some tailgate parties hook up a television set and antenna/satellite to an electric generator so partygoers can watch other sporting events.

== Local events ==
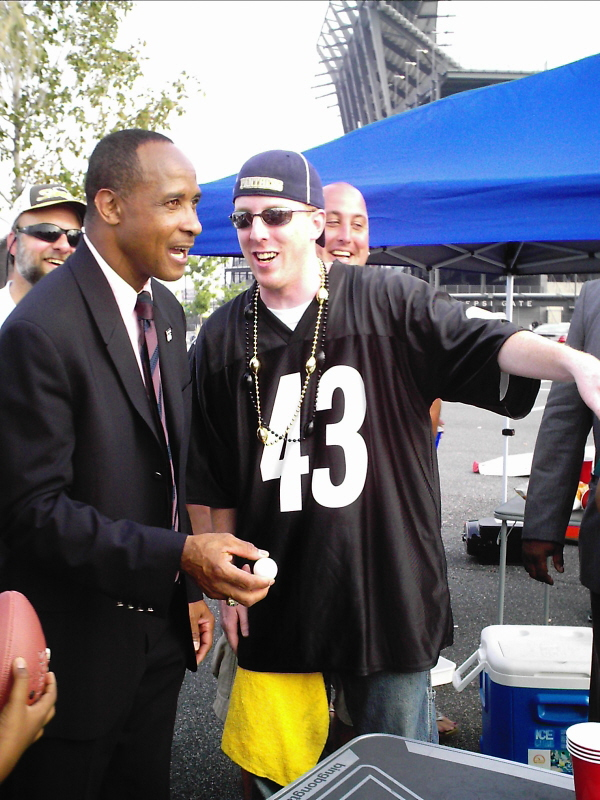
Former Steeler and 2006 candidate for Governor of Pennsylvania Lynn Swann courts voters tailgating before a football game between the Steelers and the Eagles.

In schools and communities throughout the United States, there are athletic departments, coaches and parents of student athletes who rely on post-game tailgating parties to build community and support for their program and team. Smaller, underfunded programs are assisted by the voluntary participation of parents and friends to feed the team and coaching staff post-competition, which establishes a strong core of support year after year.

In 2007, the NFL angered many football fans by banning tailgating before the Super Bowl. The NFL cited security risks, though many suspected it had more to do with corporate sponsored events than any real threat. In 2008, an online petition began circulating to encourage the NFL to lift the no tailgating at the Super Bowl policy. Members of the sports media also questioned the validity of NFL's claim that security concerns were the real reason for the ban.

In April 2019, Ontario Premier Doug Ford's staff announced the legalization of personal alcohol consumption outside sporting venues across the province, in effect creating a framework for tailgating-style events.

== In popular culture ==
In the Simpsons episode "Any Given Sundance", Homer takes his family to a tailgate party. He makes them get up early in order to be at the stadium hours before the football game, and states that "the game is nothing", the tailgate party being the only reason for them being there.

Season 3 of the Travel Channel original series Man v. Food had a tailgating special consisting of various segments from previous episodes that featured food that would make an ultimate tailgate party.

A number of television commercials, especially those aired during football games, feature tailgating culture, including those for Bud Light beer and cellphones.

In season 3 of It's Always Sunny in Philadelphia, Frank convinces Charlie to join him and tailgate while the rest of the gang try out for the Philadelphia Eagles.

Season 1 of Chicago Party Aunt had an entire episode, titled "Tailgate Jailgate", set at, and centered around, a tailgate party.

Season 4 episode 7 of Succession is called "Tailgate Party" and refers to a presidential election party held in Shiv and Tom's apartment.

In the 2023 revival of Frasier, the titular character hosts a tailgate party for a Harvard vs. Yale game, which is seen by his son as ironic as Frasier normally has little interest in sports.

== See also ==
- Drinking in public
- Fan zone
- Lawn game
