= Warhawk Alley =

Warhawk Alley is a 10-lane bowling and billiards facility located on University of Wisconsin–Whitewater campus. This area is located in the lower level of the James R. Connor University Center.

== Bowling ==
Warhawk Alley contains ten bowling lanes and serves as hosts to both the men's and women's bowling teams on the university's campus. It is not uncommon for students to take part in special bowling activities throughout the year.

The Men's Bowling Team is a Club Sport team that requires individuals to compete with other bowler's in a tryout. The team travels to compete with other bowling teams.

The Women's Bowling Team is an NCAA team sponsored by the university.

== Other Entertainment ==
Warhawk Alley is also host to eight billiards tables, multiple video game consoles, bag toss games, a dart board, and an air hockey table.
