= Lawn game =

Type of entertainment activity

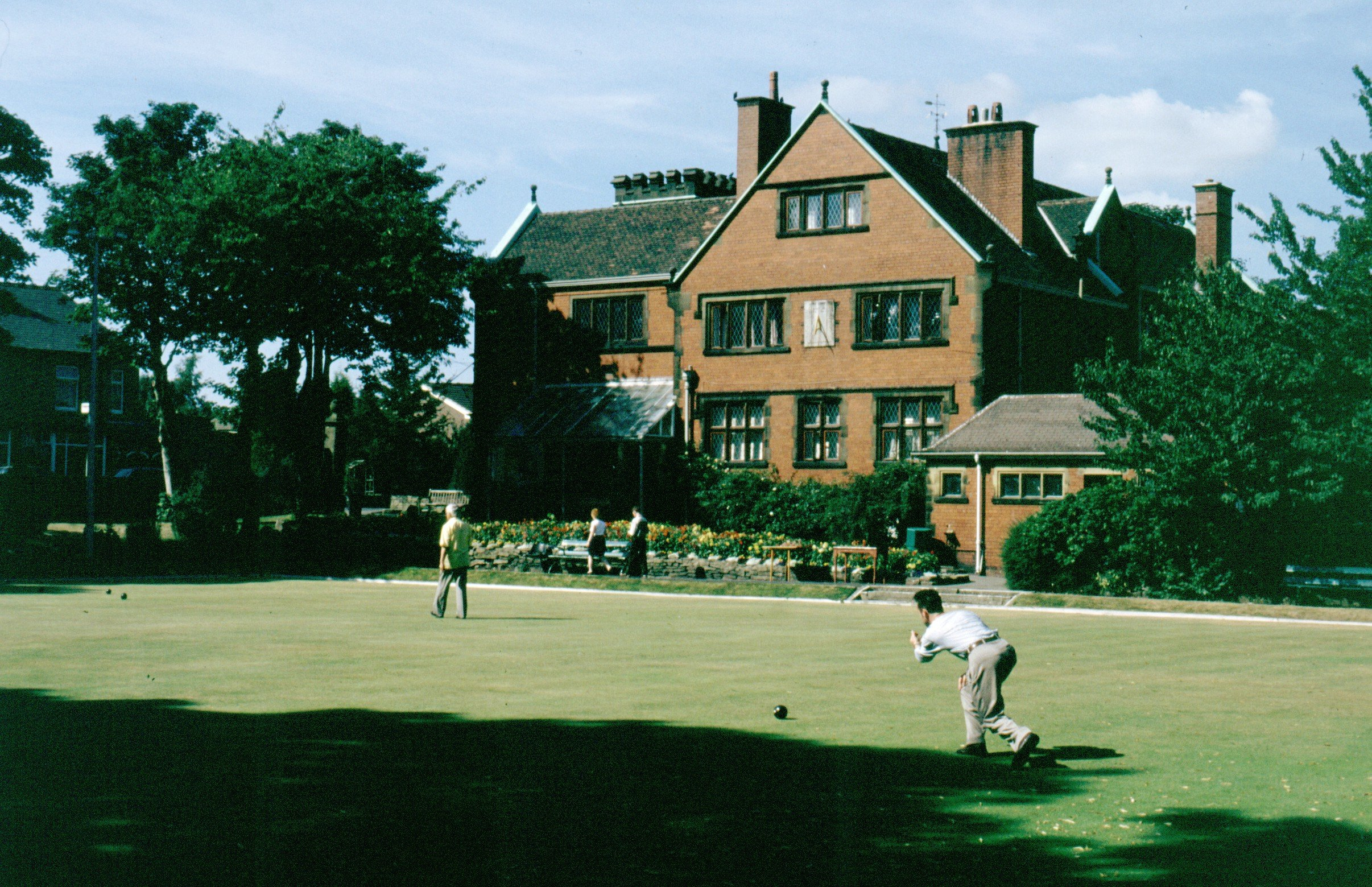
A crown bowls green at Edgworth, Lancashire, England

A lawn game is an outdoor game that can be played on a lawn. Many types and variations of lawn games exist, which includes games that use balls and the throwing of objects as their primary means of gameplay. Some lawn games are historical in nature, having been devised and played in different forms for centuries. Some lawn games are traditionally played on a pitch (sports field). Some companies produce and market lawn games for home use in a front or backyard.

== History ==
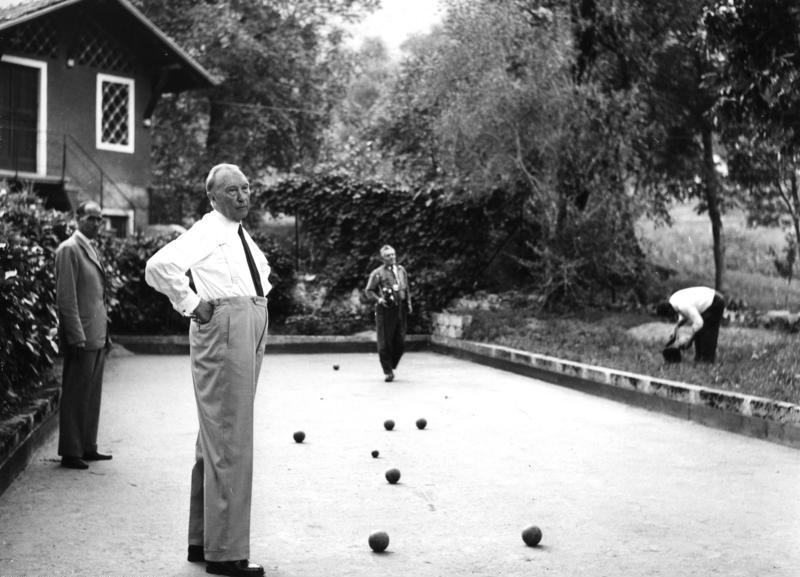
German chancellor Konrad Adenauer playing bocce in Italy, 1958

The lawn game bowls (lawn bowling) dates back to the Middle Ages period in England. Many local forms of round ball throwing and rolling games, such as bocce in Italy and bowls in England became popular by the Renaissance. It has been suggested that bowls itself likely originated from Ancient Rome, in a game played by Roman soldiers that involved rolling a ball "as close as possible to mark on the ground".

== Lawn games ==
=== Ball games ===
Many types and varieties of ball games exist. Several cultures have created forms of ball games. For example, the Maya and Aztec peoples played a ball game using a rubber ball. The Yanoama people in northwest Brazil played a game using a ball made from the bladder of a monkey, in which the ball would be hit upwards by participants, who would play the game in a circle. Bocce is typically played on a bocce court, and involves rolling a ball on the ground in efforts to place it near a smaller ball. Bowls involves rolling a ball toward a smaller target ball to make the rolled ball stop as close as possible to the target. Croquet involves hitting wooden or plastic balls with a mallet through a series of hoops. Croquet became popular in England in the 1860s. In the United States, the game is governed by the National Croquet Association, which coordinates annual tournaments. Several variations of the game exist. Pétanque is a form of bowls and boules where the goal is to throw hollow metal balls as close as possible to a small wooden ball called a cochonnet (literally "piglet") or jack, while standing inside a circle with both feet on the ground. Pétanque has been described as "the world's most played form of bowls". Backyard golf is a game played in the United States that involves elements of golf. Golf balls or whiffle balls may be used, and targets may include lawn furniture, buckets and tree branches, among others. Sholf is a game that is a cross between table shuffleboard and golf. Players take turns putting golf balls into scoring zones printed on a putting green.

Ball games

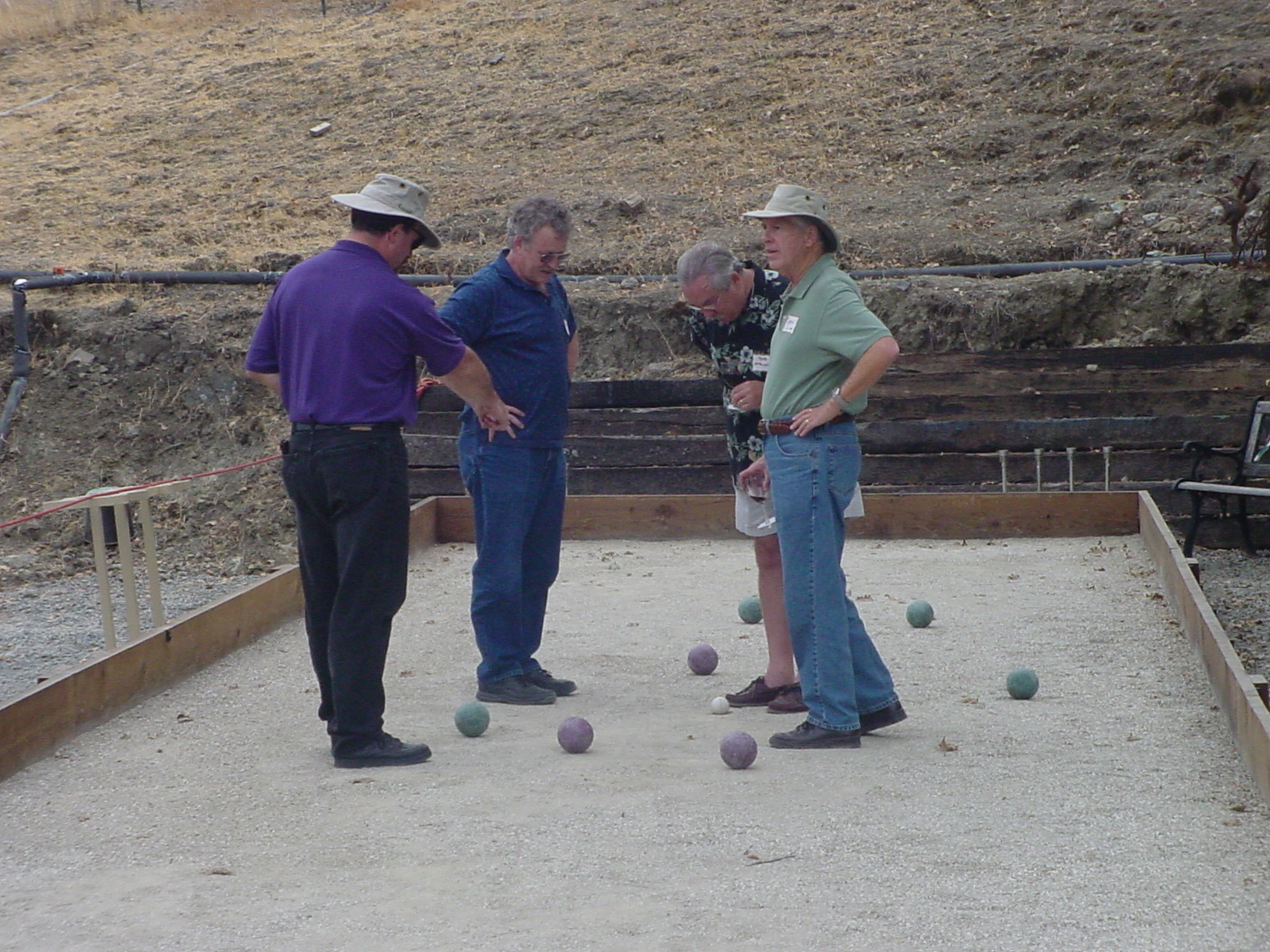
Bocce players tallying the score of a match

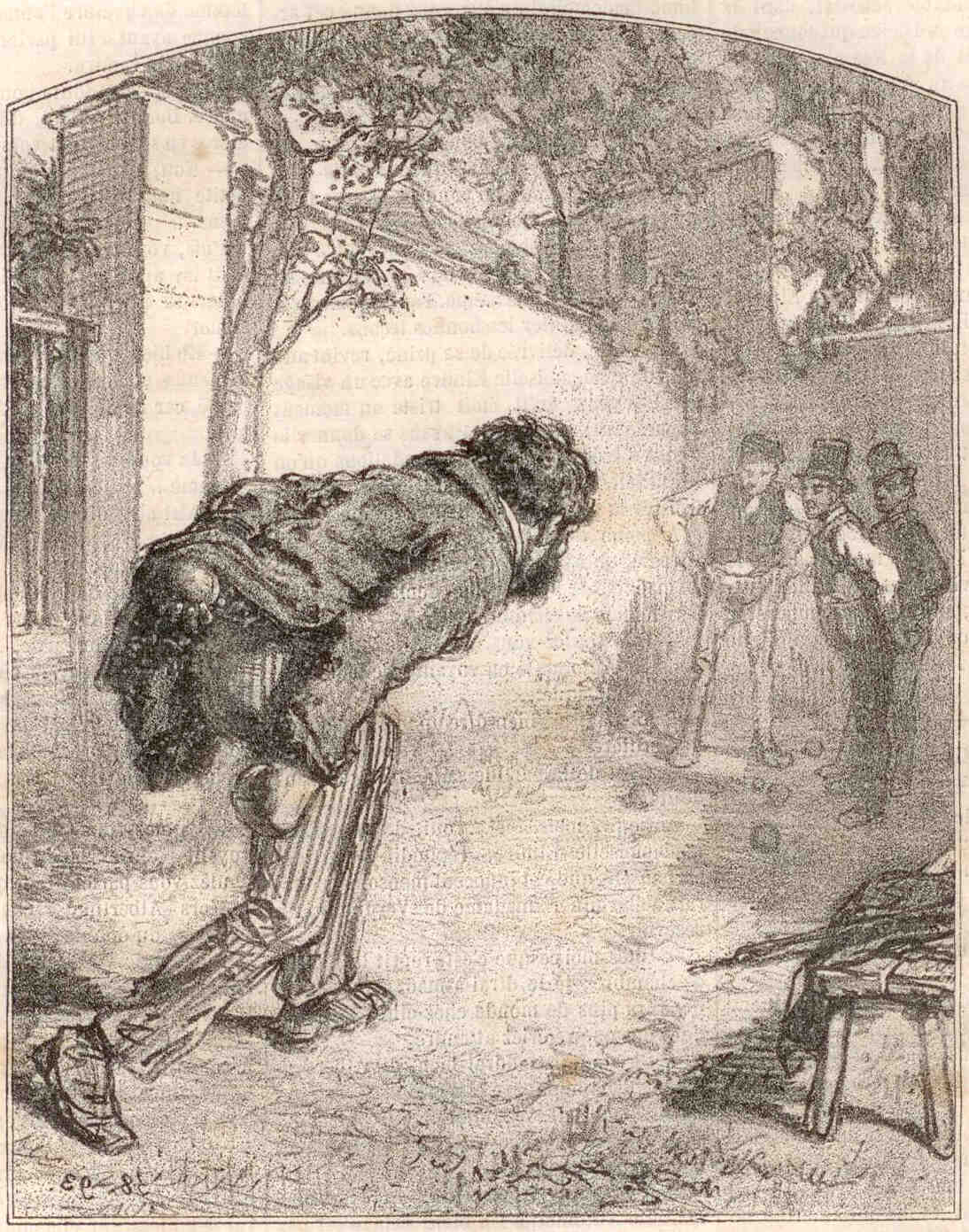
An engraving by Paul Gavarni depicting a Boules player, 1858

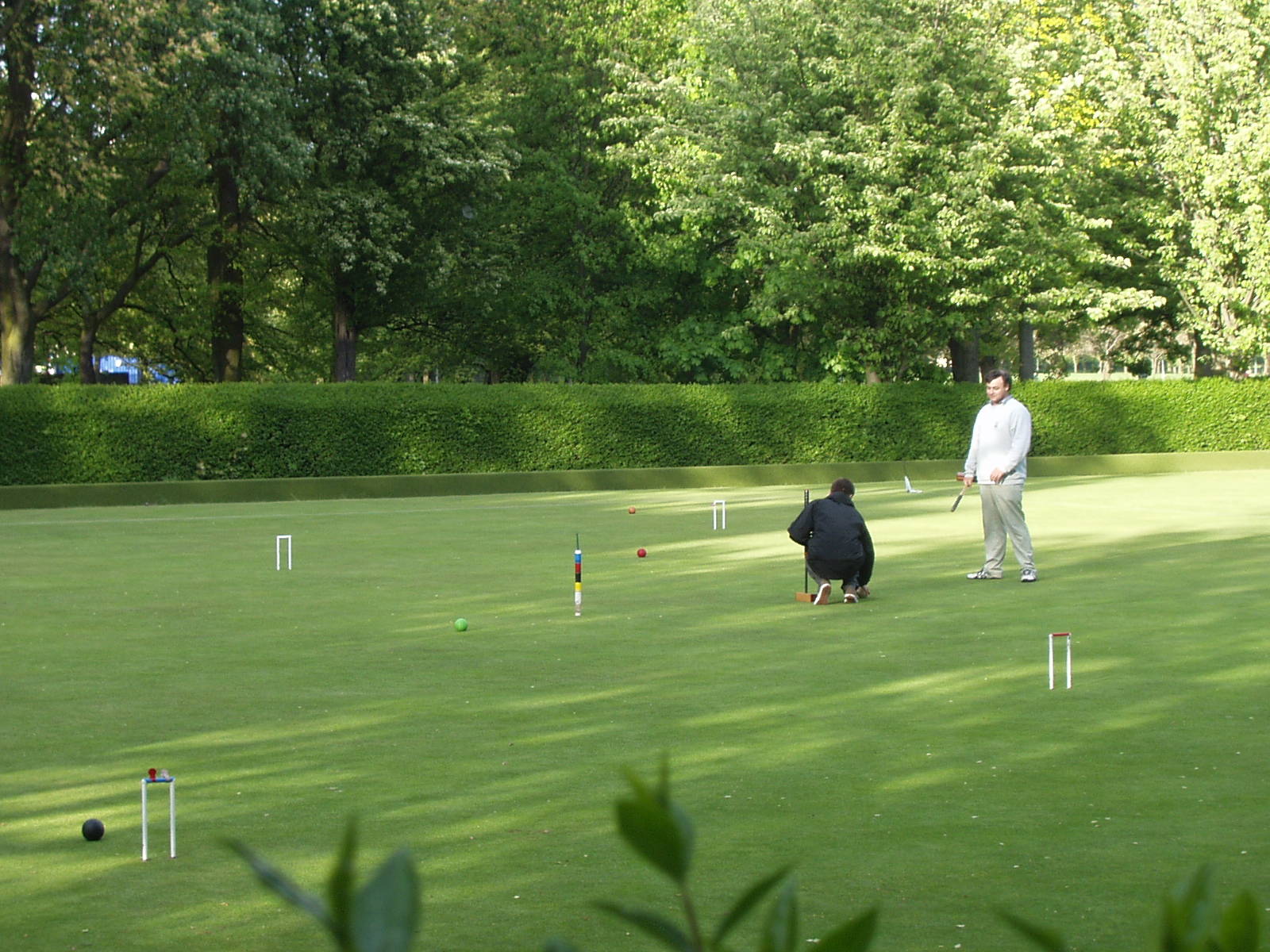
Croquet being played at a croquet club in Edinburgh, Scotland

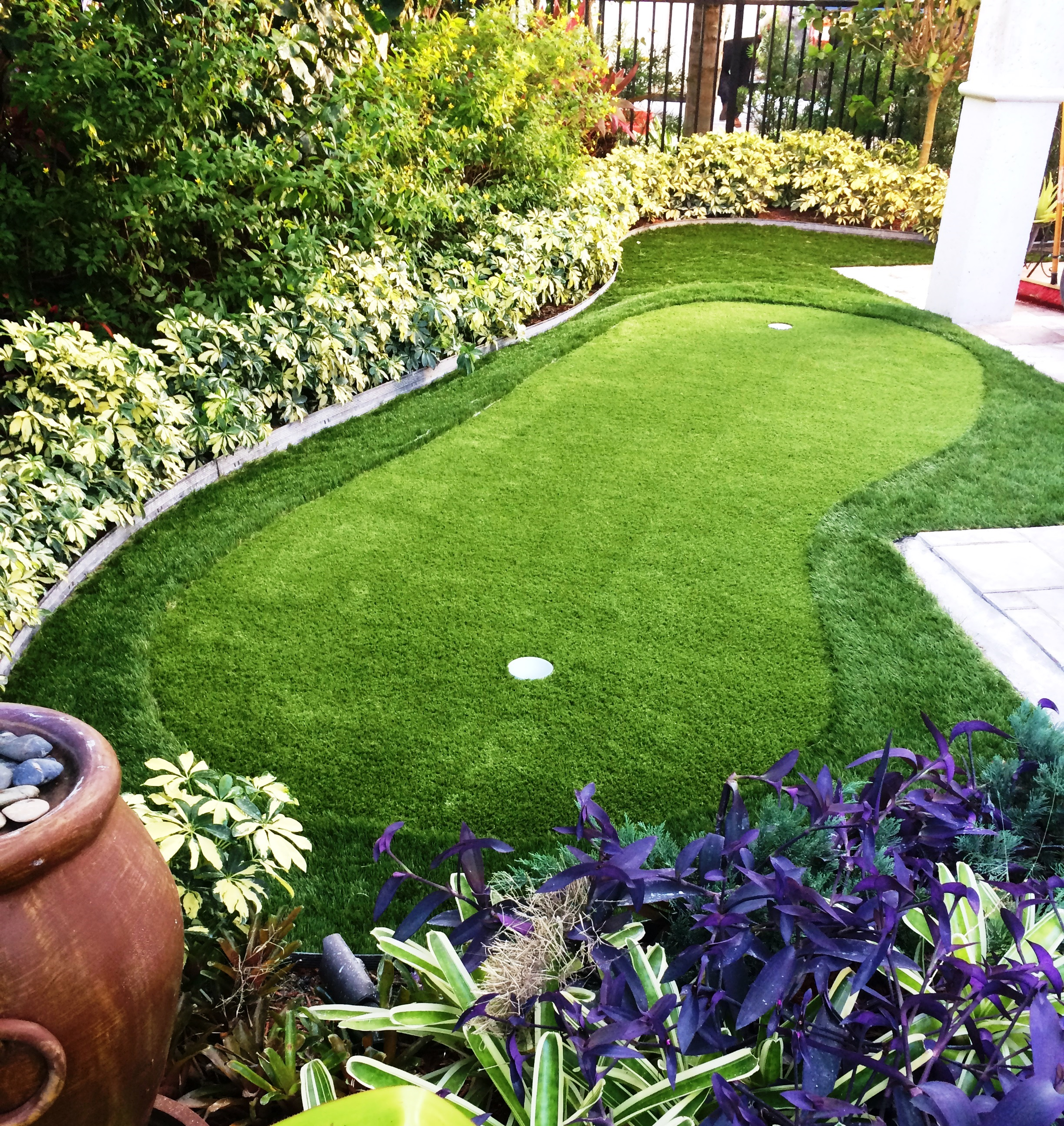
A backyard putting green created using artificial grass

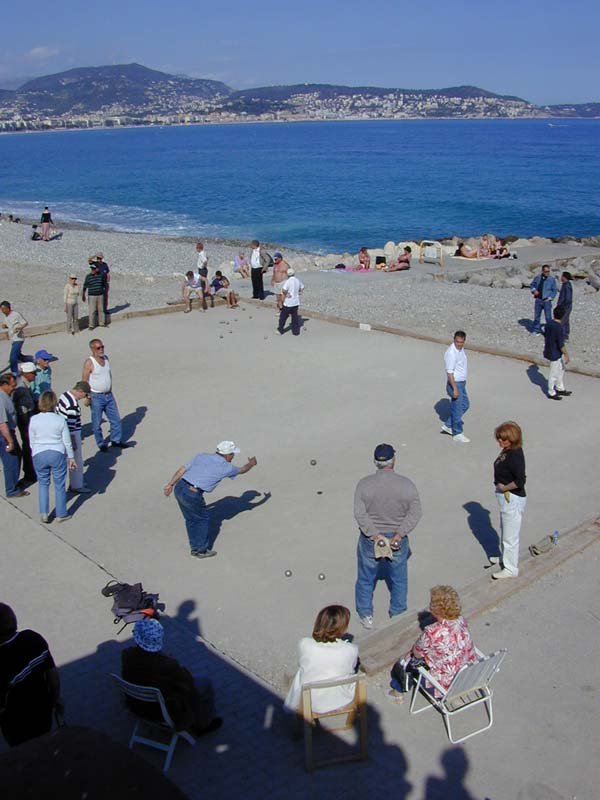
Pétanque players on the beach in Nice, France

People playing Sholf

=== Throwing games ===
Throwing games involve throwing various objects as the primary form of gameplay.

- Horseshoes involves players throwing horseshoes at stakes in the ground, with the goal of the horseshoe becoming wrapped around the stake (known as a "ringer") or the nearest to the stake compared to the others.
- Washer pitching (also referred to as washers, washer toss, huachas, washoes and Texas horseshoes) involves players in teams tossing washers toward a hole or box. Many variations of the game exist, and it has been described as similar to horseshoes.
- Lawn darts involves throwing large darts at targets that are placed on the ground. Lawn darts have been subjected to product recalls at times, due to children dying from head wounds from the darts or otherwise becoming injured by them. In the United States in 1988, the Consumer Product Safety Commission banned the sale of lawn darts. They were also banned in Canada in 1989.
- Ladder Toss involves throwing stringed balls at racks with three rungs, with points earned when the stringed balls are wrapped around a rung.
- Cornhole, also called bean bag, is a simple lawn game involving throwing bags of corn or beanbags at an inclined board that has a hole in it. Points are earned for bags going through the hole or remaining on the board.
- KanJam originated as a game called "Trash Can Frisbee", whereby a participant attempts to slam or slap a thrown flying disc into a garbage can. The game evolved into KanJam, which also involves slamming the disc into a can, along with points earned for the thrown disc hitting the can.
Throwing games

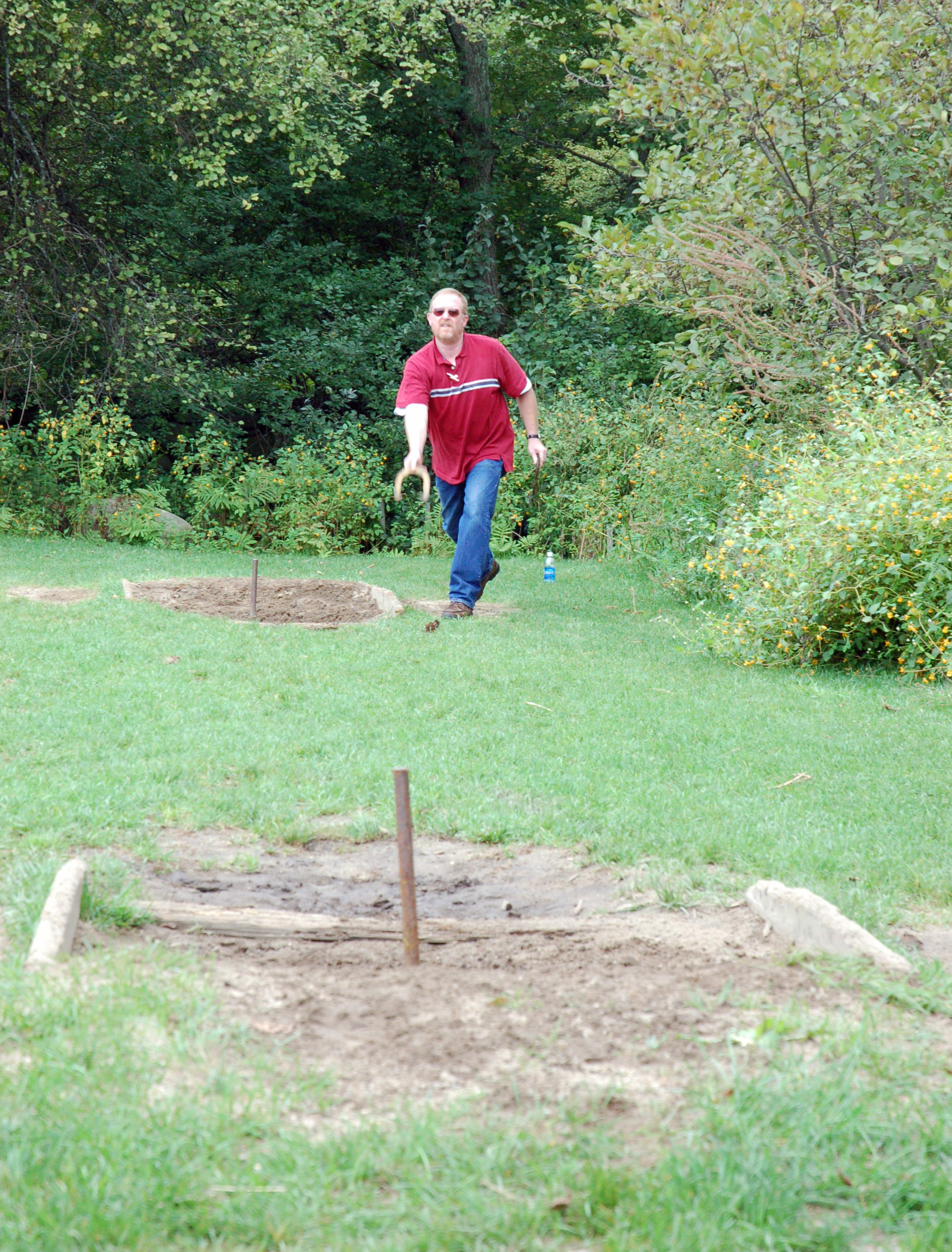
A person playing horseshoes

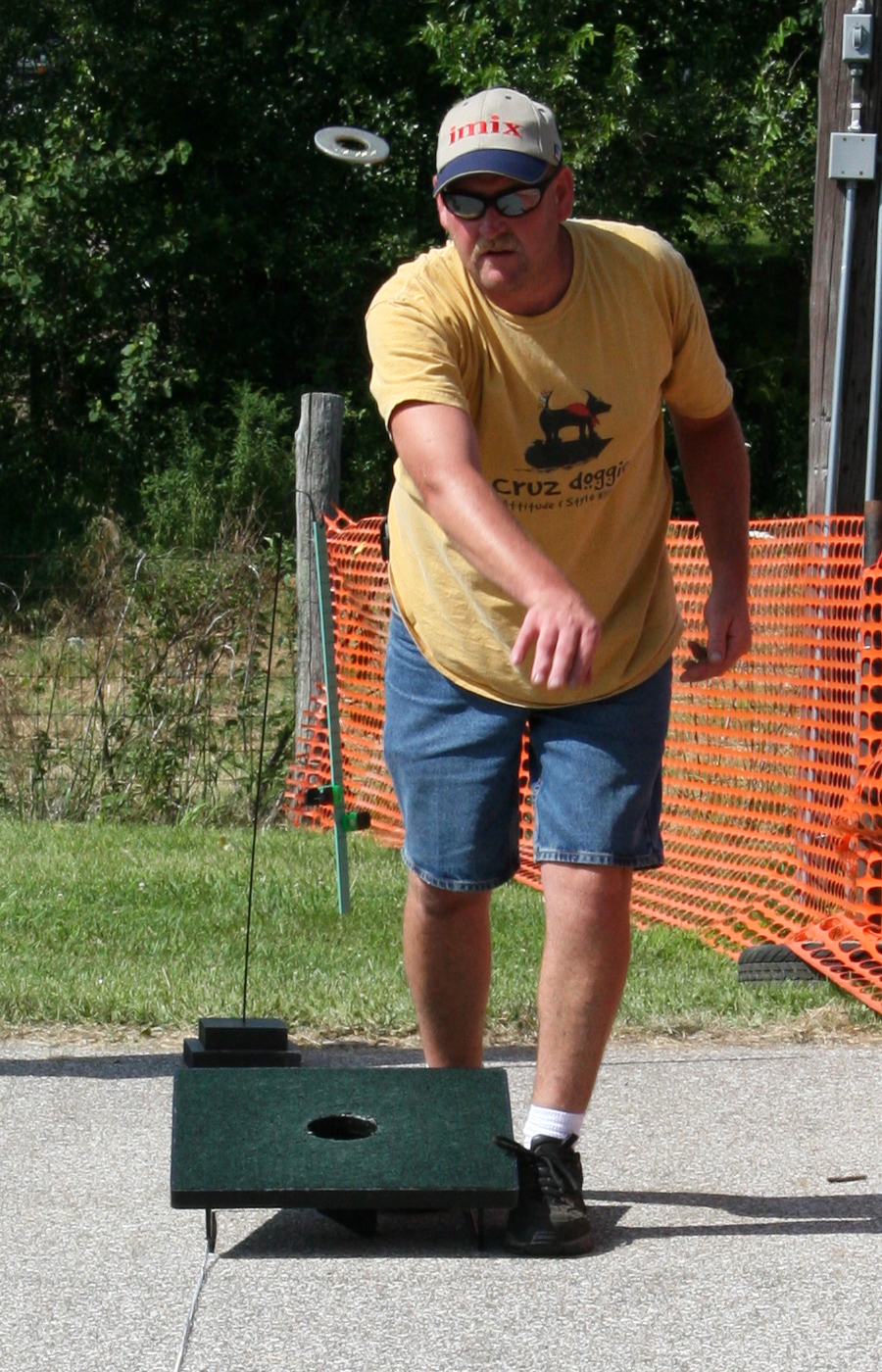
A player tosses a washer during a washer pitching tournament in Indiana

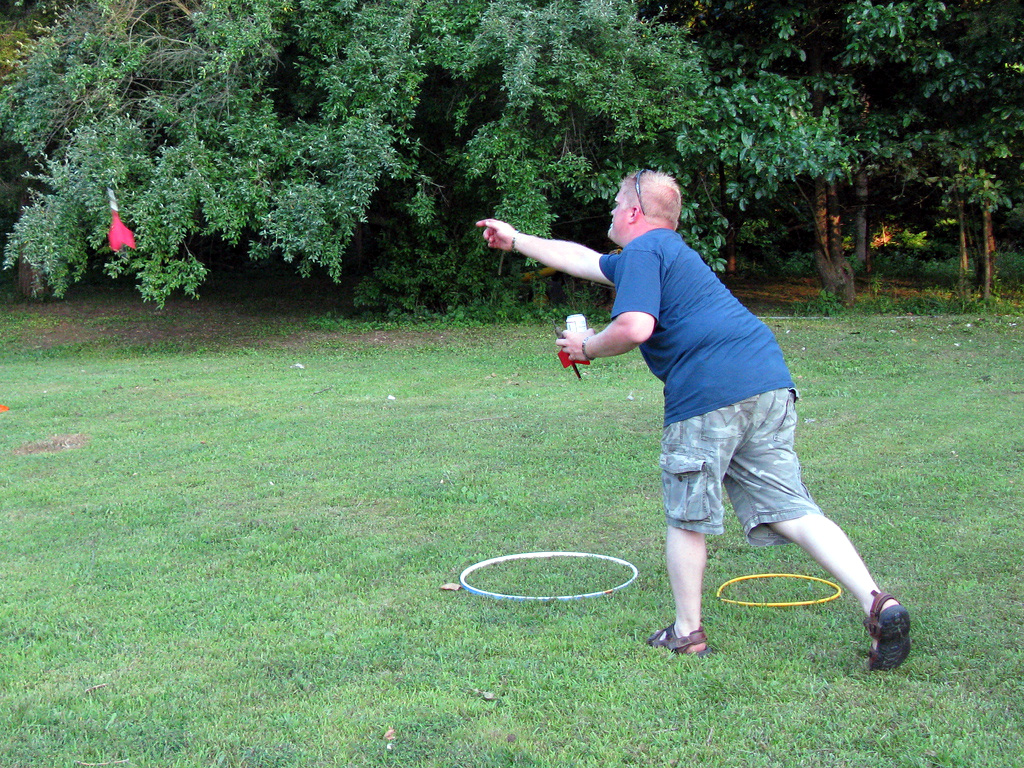
A man throwing lawn darts

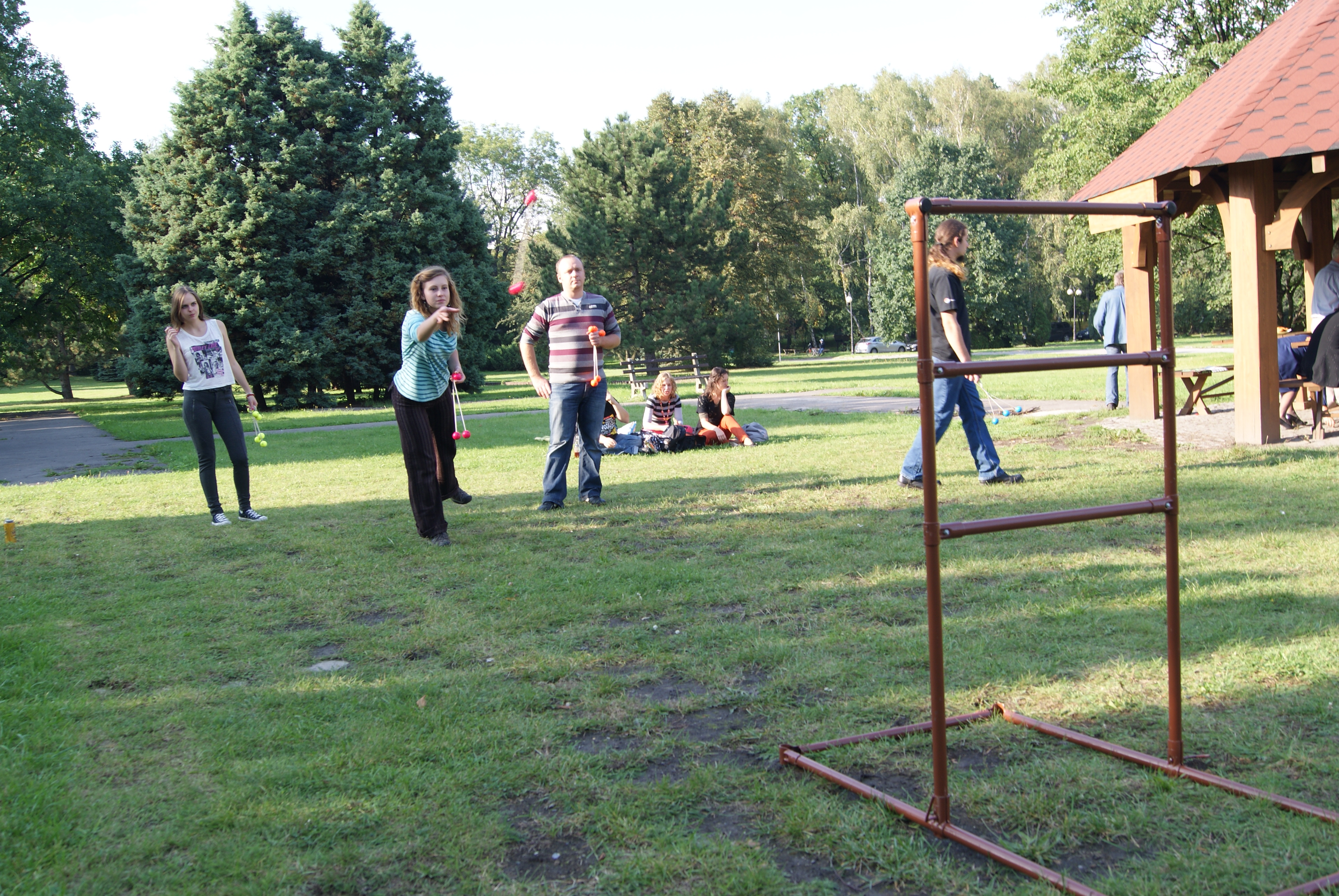
People playing ladder toss

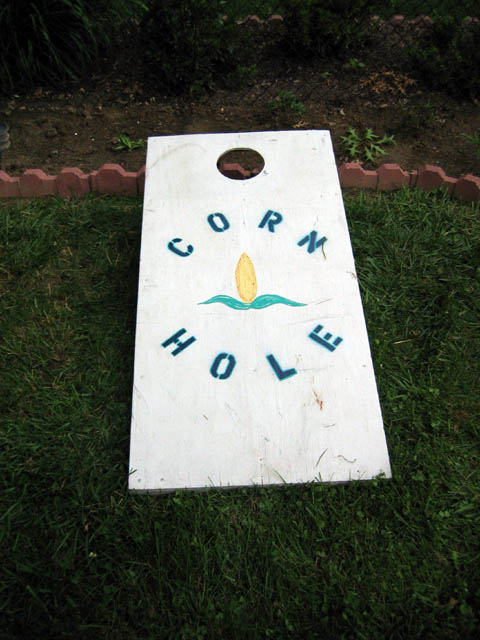
A cornhole board

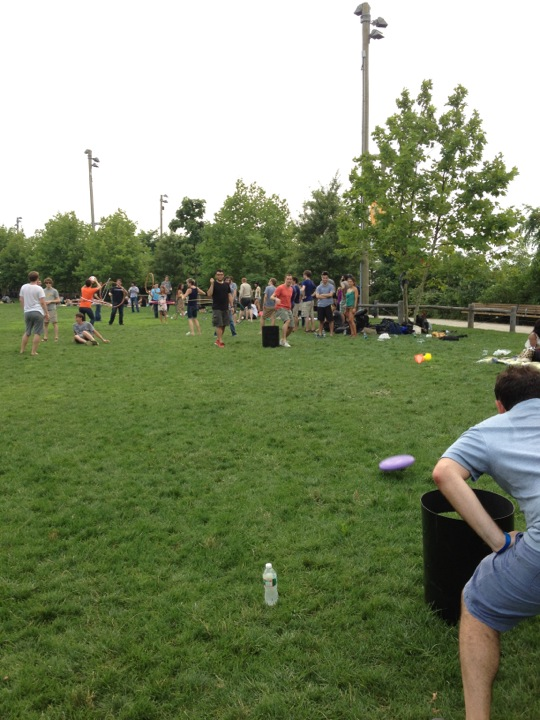
People playing KanJam

=== Other ===
- tag
- hide and seek
- egg and spoon race
- Three-legged race
- sack race
- wheelbarrow race

== See also ==
- Backyard cricket
- Cherokee marbles
- Egg rolling
- Kubb
- Mölkky
- Polish horseshoes
- Quoits
- Skittles
- Throwing sports
- Trangleball
- French cricket

== Bibliography ==
- Rowell, V.; Tukey, P. (2012). Tag, Toss & Run: 40 Classic Lawn Games. Storey Publishing, LLC. ISBN 978-1-60342-809-5. 208 pages.
