= Backyard golf =

Lawn game

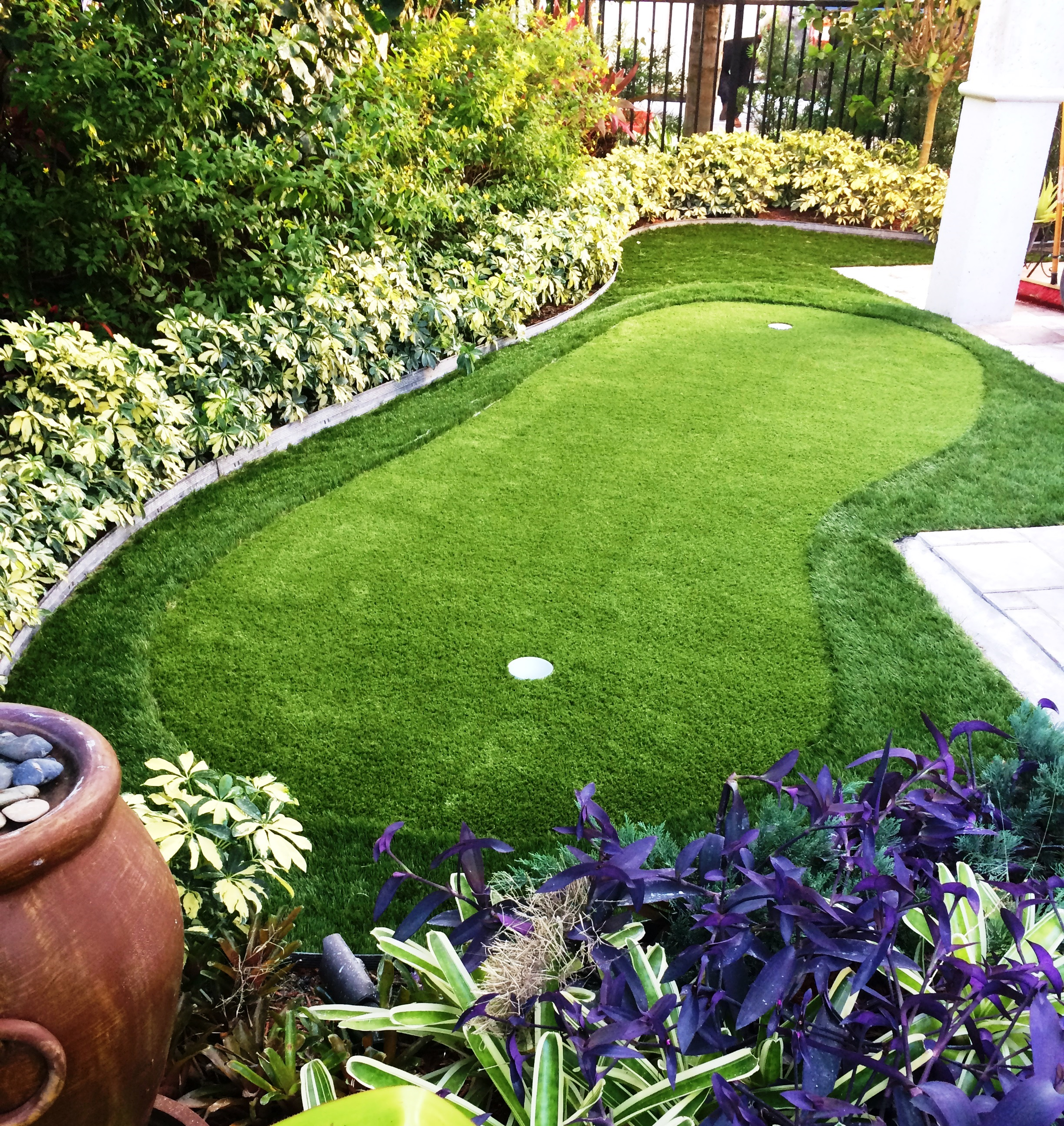
A backyard putting green created using artificial grass

Backyard golf is a lawn game played in the United States. The game is very similar to golf; however, it uses fewer clubs (i.e. sand wedge, pitching wedge, and nine iron). The balls are wiffleballs that are often covered with electrical, duct, or masking tape. The courses typically consist of one central hole location where different tee boxes constitute different "holes." Most courses have nine holes, although larger yards have been known to have 18 or 36 holes. The game is very easy to play as it requires minimal technical skill. The large size of the ball and short distance of the holes make backyard golf conducive to casual play.

The whereabouts of the game's origins remain unclear. It is entirely probable that the game was "invented" many times in many locations as a fun game in the vein of horseshoes, shuffleboard, or croquet. The game is very popular in Western Massachusetts where organized tournaments have occurred.

A relatively famous permanent course exists in Ludlow, Massachusetts on Chapin Street. It is known as the Ancient Nine or Lavoie Course. It is the only known course where the public is welcome to play the game on private property free of charge during daylight hours. Another course exists in Willoughby, Ohio on Marble Lane.
