= Ladder toss =

American throwing game

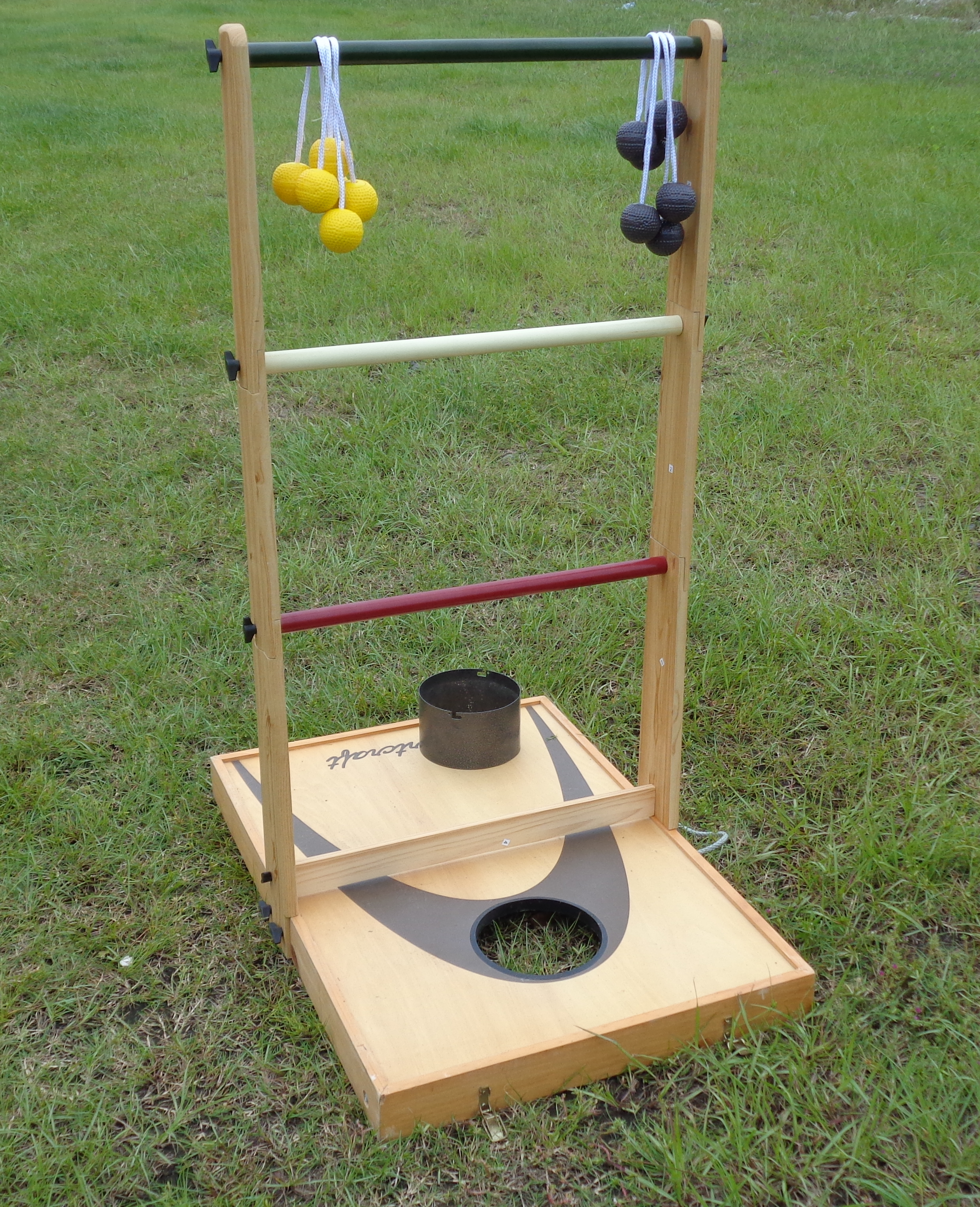
A ladder toss set

Ladder toss is a lawn game played by throwing bolas (two balls connected by a string) onto a ladder.

== History ==
A "ball and ladder game" was patented in 2002 by Pennsylvanian Robert G. Reid, a postman who had played the game with his family for decades before deciding to file for patent in November, 1999. The game is reported as having been played on Escapees campgrounds in the United States in the late 1990s. Some origin stories speculate that the bola is a stand-in for a live snake, which cowboys in the western United States or caballeros in Mexico would throw at fences or branches for points.

Reid sold his patent to Ladder Golf LLC, recorded in the patent office in March 2005, and the company began manufacturing the game commercially. The company sponsored a tournament in San Diego in April, 2005, featuring 32 teams.

== Etymology ==
Being a relatively new and grassroots game, it goes by many names. Some of these names are "Läderbölen" (English: "Ladder Ball"), "Bälle auf der Linie" (English: "Balls on the Line"), "Lasso Golf", "North Dakota Golf", "Norwegian Golf", "Dangle Ball", "Balls on Bars", "Hillbilly Golf", "Testicle Toss", "Balls-a-Danglin", "Polish Golf", and many others. There is also a patented version of the game called Ladder Golf.

== Rules ==
The items needed to play are two ladders and a set of three bolas per team. At the start of the game, a tossing line is set five paces away from the ladders. The player cannot step over the tossing line during their turn.

Three bolas are given to each player or team at the start of the game. A player or team completes their turn by throwing all of their bolas towards the ladders. The next player or team can commence their turn after the previous player or team have thrown all of their bolas.

Opponents may try to distract the current tosser during their turn, but they cannot touch the player or walk between the player and the ladders.

=== Scoring ===
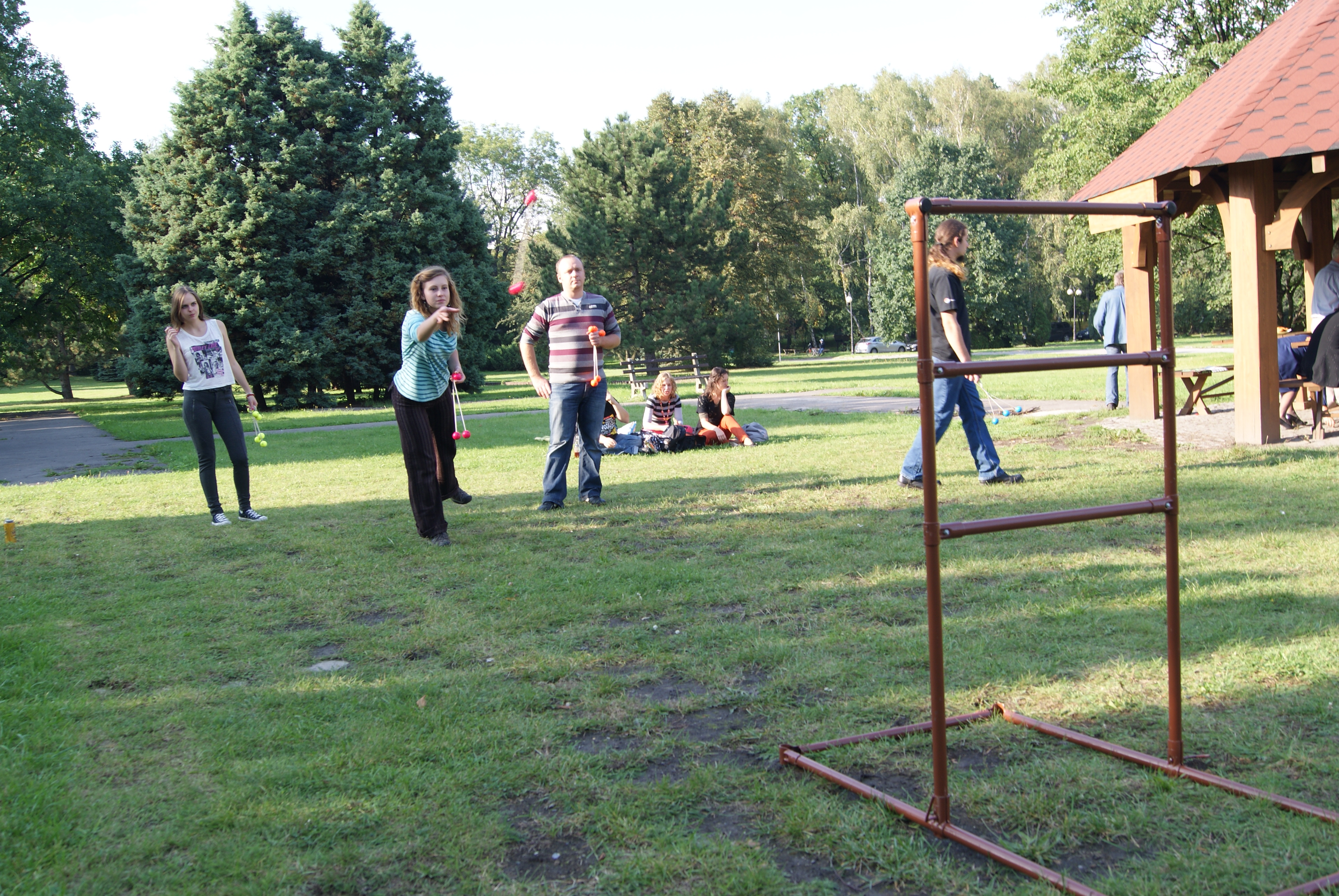
People playing ladder toss

Each ladder has three rungs, each rung scoring a different point value. One common method of scoring is to have the rungs be one, two and three points. In one variety the top is worth 1, middle is 2, and bottom is 3. Points are tallied at the end of each round, after all teams have thrown their bolas. The bolas suspended on the ladder score the points for that rung, often with the goal of getting at least 21 points to win.

The most common variety of scoring would be 1pt for the bottom rung, 2pts for the middle, 3pts for the top, and a bola on each of the rungs scores an automatic 10pts. This makes the game move faster, but is just as hard. If the ball bounces off the ground and lands on a bar it does not count as a point.

There are a few optional ways to earn or lose points:

- A "tight dangle bonus" is when the balls can no longer be wrapped around the horizontal rods. This is worth an additional point to each tight dangle.
- A "springboard bonus" occurs when the balls launch back in the direction they were thrown. A springboard bonus is worth one additional point.
- Points are cancelled where the bolas of the opponent land on the same rung. For example, if Player A throws onto the middle rung he or she scores 2 points, but when the opponent lands on that same rung, the scores cancel, netting to 0. Points only cancel on the same rung. Player A could have two bolas wrapped on the bottom rung (1pt) and Player B one bola wrapped on the middle rung (2pts), assuming no other bolas stuck, the net score would be 2 - 2 for that round of play. This optional play makes the game more competitive and the game may last longer.
- Other bonuses include 5 pts for a full house (a bola on each of the rungs) and 3 bonus pts for a triple (three bola on one rung). There are also optional rules for bonus points including a 'knocker' (the balls of the bola hitting each other), a 'banger' (the balls of the bola hitting the rack), a 'dropper' (the bola landing on a rung then dropping to a lower rung) and a 'grounder' (hitting the ground before the rungs). The bonus points can be combined, for example with a 'knock-dropper' scoring two bonus points. Other named shots include a 'twiddler' (multiple spins around the rung) and a 'gapper' (going through a gap clean).
- English scoring is 3pts for the top rung, 1pt for the middle, and 1pt for you and 1pt off the opponent for the bottom.

Players race to 21, but anybody who goes above 21 is 'bust' and nothing is added to their score that round. If players tie, they continue play until a player is at least 2 points ahead.

== Construction ==
The balls on the bolas are often golf balls, but may be any uniform weight. They are sometimes plastic balls, tennis balls, rubber balls or a monkey's fist knot. Teams are distinguished by having their own color. For example, Team One may have three bolas with blue string, Team Two may have red string and Team Three may have purple string. Also, the teams may have different colors of balls. Ladder toss may be played with two people (one person per team) or up to six people (three teams of two people).

The rungs may be plastic pipe, wood or other materials. Construction of the game is relatively easy and can be put together with the following:

- 16' – ¾" PVC pipe
- 2 – ¾" PVC elbow joints
- 6 – ¾" PVC "T" joints
- 12' – 3/8" nylon rope
- 12 – balls (six each of two different colors)
- 4 – ¾" PVC end caps (optional)

Ladder toss with white PVC pipes at a University of Texas tailgate

Irrigation (white) PVC pipe is commonly used but electrical (grey) PVC conduit may be preferable, at increased cost, as it contains UV inhibitors to prevent the PVC from getting brittle from sunlight exposure. Alternatively, painting (white) PVC pipe would also protect them from UV; be sure to use a paint intended for plastics and sanding with 220 grit will help with adhesion.

The game is often played while tailgating at sporting events. There may be various rule sets used.

== See also ==
- Cornhole
- Horseshoes
- Tejo (sport)
- Ring toss
