= American Cornhole Organization =

American organization for the sport of cornhole

- Company type: Private
- Industry: Sports league
- Founded: Cincinnati, Ohio, U.S. (2005)
- Founder: Frank Geers
- Headquarters: Camp Dennison, Ohio, U.S.
- Website: americancornhole.com

The American Cornhole Organization (ACO) was founded in 2005 by Frank Geers for the purpose of transforming the game of cornhole, often played recreationally for fun, into a competitive National Sport. In December 2006, American Cornhole Organization held its first ACO Nationals Championship in Northern Kentucky.

== Overview ==
The ACO was established in 2005 to standardize cornhole equipment and cornhole rules. Headquartered in Camp Dennison, Ohio, the ACO relies on a network of ACO Certified Officials to facilitate sanctioning ACO Majors, Pro Series Tours, ACO Cornhole Tournaments and ACO Cornhole Leagues across the United States and Europe. In the early days of its foundation, the ACO established standardization of cornhole board, bag, and rules in ACO sanctioned cornhole events.

In 2005, the ACO developed a line of cornhole products and a platform for cornhole rules, handicapping, player rankings, and league and tournament structures under the umbrella of the ACO Governing Body for the Sport of Cornhole.

Prior to the first ACO Nationals, the American Cornhole Organization held various organized ACO cornhole tournaments and events, including the Carson Palmer Cornhole Classic in Cincinnati in June 2006.

In 2006, The ACO held its first ACO Nationals Championship in Northern Kentucky to crown the ACO Nationals King of Cornhole. The same year, the ACO introduced a resin fill beg at its Nationals Championship, replacing the standard corn fill bag. The resin-fill bag has become widely adopted in the sport.

The ACO introduced standardized and sanctioned equipment to the game including ACO Star Logo Cornhole Boards, ACO Soft Touch Resin Fill Cornhole Bags, and ACO Governing Body Sport of Cornhole Rules. Structure and consistency gave legitimacy to cornhole as a sport, which helps ACO spread professional cornhole on a national scale.

In 2009 the ACO introduced the PlayersChoice Cornhole Bag - a bag with a two-sided playing surface, which added complexity to the sport.

== American Cornhole Historic Markers ==
- ACO PRO First Nationals Championships to crown ACO King of Cornhole
- ACO Introduces Resin Filled Cornhole Bags 2006
- ACO Introduces Airmail Box and Challenge 2007
- ACO Unveils ACO PRO Skill Challenge Test to Rank Pros Nationally 2007
- ACO PRO Jersey introduced at Easter Seals Tailgate Bash World Championships 2007
- ACO Adds World Ranking Points System featuring CornyForty - Top 40 Cornhole Players 2008
- ACO Introduces PlayersChoice Tournament Series Bags - two sided playing surface 2008
- AC "Star Logo" Tournament Series Cornhole Boards star in Cornhole the Movie 2010
- ACO Introduces - ACO Certified Officials & Sanctioned Cornhole Events 2010
- Topps Company Official Cornhole Collector's Card featuring Matt Guy, reigning 5-time ACO King of Cornhole Champion 2011
- ACO World Championships of Cornhole featured on ESPN's Kenny Mayne Wider World of Sports Summer 2013
- ACO World Championships of Cornhole featured on ESPN's SportsCenter on the Road w/ Matt Barrie & Sara Walsh Summer 2015
- World Cornhole Day - last Saturday of July - Official Proclamation in Columbia, SC in 2020
