= Lawn dart effect =

Sensory illusion in aviation

In aviation, the lawn dart effect occurs when fighter aircraft pilots accelerate horizontally at more than 1 standard gravity. The effect occurs when such extreme stimulation to the vestibular system leads to the perception that the aircraft is climbing, prompting the pilot to lower the aircraft's pitch attitude, or drop the nose.

== See also ==
- Sensory illusions in aviation
- Lawn darts
- G-force
- Dart (missile)
- Throwing dart
