= Sholf =

Sholf at a tailgate party

Sholf is a lawn game that is a cross between table shuffleboard and golf. Players take turns putting golf balls into scoring zones printed on a putting green.

== Gameplay ==
Players take turns putting golf balls, trying to score points, bump opposing golf balls off the green, and/or protect their own golf ball from bump-offs. Each player or team of two players is assigned a golf ball color.

After all eight golf balls have been played, each player re-putts their furthest ball from the scoring end. This is called the mulligan ball. The player who is not in scoring position putts their mulligan ball first. Only the team with the closest ball(s) to the scoring end receive points. Balls must completely cross the line to get the higher point value. Play then continues in the opposite direction. The winner of a match is the first to score thirteen points.

=== Singles or doubles ===
Sholf can be played as doubles or singles. In doubles play two contestants are partners against another team of two contestants; in singles play a contestant competes against another contestant.

In doubles play, one member from each team putts from one end of the Sholf putting green and the other member putts from the other end. In singles play, both contestants putt from the same end of the putting green.

=== Stonebridge ===
In Stonebridge play the mulligan ball rule is eliminated and matches are played as a best of three series. The winner of each game is the first to score fifteen points and the winner of the match is the first to win two games.
