= American Cornhole League =

Sanctioning body for professional cornhole in the United States

The American Cornhole League (ACL) is one of the sanctioning bodies for the sport of professional cornhole in the United States. Headquartered in Rock Hill, South Carolina, the ACL hosts over 25,000 tournaments per year and has an active player base of over 100,000 players.

The ACL features a group of professional cornhole players each season that compete on television broadcasts (network partners include ESPN and CBS). These players are referred to as ACL Pros.

The ACL is majority owned by ACL Commissioner Stacey Moore. In 2021, the ACL introduced its first outside investors of Asland Capital Partners and John Thompson III.

== History ==
The American Cornhole League (ACL) was founded in 2015 by Stacey Moore, its current Commissioner. It established a standard bag for competitive play and partnered with manufacturer AllCornhole for licensed cornhole equipment. In 2016 ACL streamed its first competitive event "Championship of Bags" on ESPN3., which began airing in 2017 on ESPN2. In 2019 ACL created the nonprofit USA Cornhole to support the sport's growth with the goal of inclusion in the Olympics.

In 2020 amid the COVID-19 pandemic, the ACL aired on ESPN networks for six straight weeks, propelling exponential growth for the league and sport. In 2021, the ACL signed a network contract with CBS Sports, introduced the ACL Pro Shootout Series, and launched the ACL Cornhole TV streaming channel in partnership with Triple-B Media.

== Divisions and skill levels ==
As of 2024, ACL sponsors skill-restricted National Pro Tour competitions (including the World Championships in the fall) and unrestricted Open events. Players are able to improve their standings and potentially qualify for Pro competitions by participating in State, Regional, and Local Open events. Skill levels are determined by average Points Per Round (PPG), consisting of Advanced (PPG >= 8), Competitive (PPG 7-8), Intermediate (PPG 6-7), Novice (PPG <6).

== Rules and regulations ==
The American Cornhole League has specific rules on how they work tournaments. Some of these rules are what kinds of bags and boards that can be used. Both boards and bags have to be stamped with the ACL logo on it to be considered regulation. With having the stamp put on it shows the bags and boards are the right weight and length. In other cases some of the ACL rules can be flawed for example players keeping their own score, this can lead to cheating. To solve the cheating is to have AST keep the scores instead of the players manually keeping it (Overturf). By solving this issue it prevents games and even tournaments from being replayed (Gillespie). The ACL relies on players to be honest with their score but in some cases, the players are not truthful. McCarthy states "Part of the standardization of equipment for the league was rooted in its proprietary ACL Bag Policy which standardized the cornhole bag for competitive play and the league's partnership with AllCornhole for officially licensed ACL Pro cornhole boards".Another rule is you need an ACL-stamped bag in order to use that bag in an ACL tournament. The reasoning behind the stamp is to make the game as fair as possible so people do not bring in lighter or heavier bags to cheat. Another rule they have is that the boards have to be 27 feet apart from the front of the boards. The boards in the American Cornhole league have to be stamped just like the bags so no one can bring a slow or slick board to tournaments and have an advantage over their competition.

== ACL Teams ==
The ACL Teams division is composed of sixteen teams divided into four regions within two divisions. There are also minor league teams, akin to a farm system in baseball, which each span a few states.

American Division
Region	Team	Minor Team (States)
North	Michigan Marauders	Detroit Marauders (Michigan, Minnesota, Wisconsin)
North	New England Woodchucks	Bangor Woodchucks (Maine, New Hampshire, and Vermont); Boston Woodchucks (Massachusetts), Hartford Woodchucks (Connecticut), Worcester Woodchucks (Rhode Island)
North	Ohio Aviators	Charleston Aviators (West Virginia), Cincinnati Aviators (Ohio), Cleveland Aviators (Ohio)
North	Pennsylvania Ringers	Albany Ringers (New York), Philadelphia Ringers (Pennsylvania), Syracuse Ringers, Trenton Ringers (New Jersey)
South	Carolina Coasters	High Point Coasters (North Carolina), Rock Hill (South Carolina)
South	Florida Freeze	Palm Beach Freeze (Florida)
South	Georgia Sliders	Suwanee Sliders (Georgia), Hernando Sliders (Mississippi and Alabama)
South	Virginia Cutters	Chesapeake Cutters, Fredericksburg Cutters (Virginia; also Maryland, Delaware and Washington, D.C.)
National Division
Region	Team	Minor Team (States)
Central
Central	Chicagoland Spinners	Cook County Spinners (Illinois), New Paris Spinners (Indiana)
Central	Kentucky Kernels	Memphis Kernels (Tennessee and Arkansas; also Kentucky)
Central	Missouri Maize	Springfield Maize (Missouri, Iowa, Kansas, Nebraska, and Oklahoma)
Central	Texas Bully Baggers	Baton Rouge Bully Baggers (Louisiana), College Station Bully Baggers, Dallas Bully Baggers, Houston Bully Baggers (all Texas)
West
West	Arizona Burn	Phoenix Burn, Tucson Burn (both Arizona and New Mexico), Salt Lake City Burn (Utah)
West	Cali Slingers	Oʻahu Slingers (Hawaiʻi), Sacramento Slingers (California)
West	Colorado Timber	Mitchell Timber (The Dakotas; also Colorado, Montana, and Wyoming)
West	Las Vegas High Rollers	Portland High Rollers (Oregon), Rainier High Rollers (Washington and Idaho), Reno High Rollers (Nevada); also Alaska
