= Cornhole =

Lawn game involving throwing bags of corn (or beans)

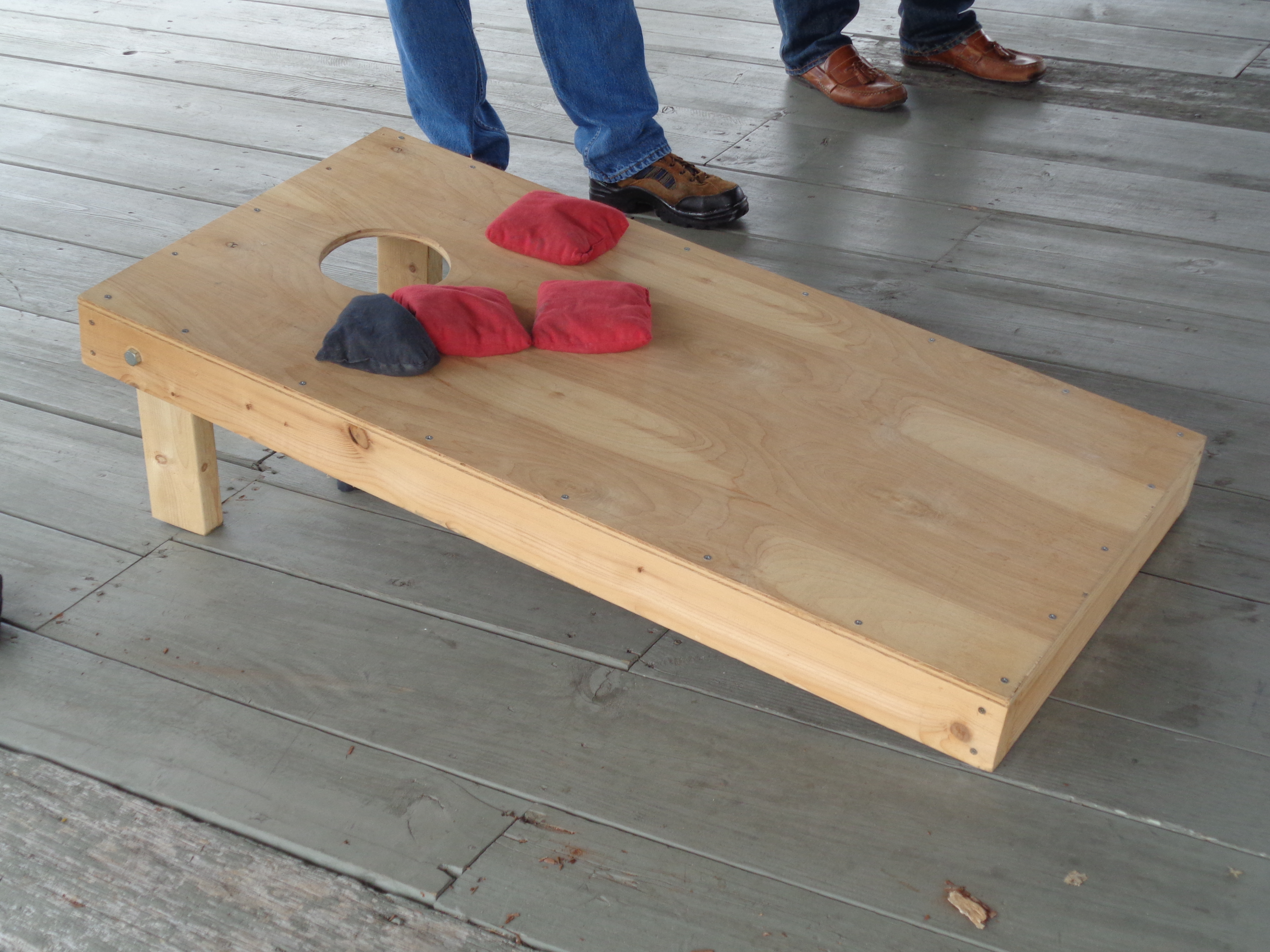
- A typical cornhole board, with two colors of bag
- Nicknames: Baggo, bean bag toss, dummy boards, doghouse, dadhole, sacks, beans, beanbag, ball bags, bean in the hole, ramps, bean bags

Characteristics
- Contact: No
- Team members: Either doubles or singles
- Type: Outdoor

Presence
- Country or region: North America

Cornhole (also known regionally as sack toss, bean bag toss, or bags) is a lawn game popular in North America in which players or teams take turns throwing fabric bean bags at an inclined board with a hole in its far end. The goal of the game is to score points by either landing a bag on the board (one point) or putting a bag through the hole (three points).

== History ==
The game was first described in Heyliger de Windt's 1883 patent for "Parlor Quoits", which displays most of the features of modern cornhole, but uses a square hole. Quoits is a game similar to horseshoes, played by throwing steel rings at a metal spike. Several earlier "parlor quoits" patents had sought to re-create quoit gameplay in an indoor environment, but De Windt's was the first to use bean bags and a slanted board with a hole as the target.

He sold the rights to the game to a Massachusetts toy manufacturer which marketed a version of it under the name "Faba Baga". Unlike modern cornhole, which has one hole and one size of bags, a Faba Baga board had two different-sized holes, worth different point values, and provided each player with one extra-large bag per round, which could score double points.

In September 1974, Popular Mechanics magazine published an article written by Carolyn Farrell about a similar game called "bean-bag bull's-eye". Bean-bag bull's-eye was played on a board the same width as modern cornhole boards (24 in [60 cm]), but only 36 in [90 cm] long as opposed to the 48 in [120 cm] length used in cornhole. The hole was the same diameter (6 in [15 cm]) but was centered 8 in [20 cm] (rather than 9 in [23 cm]) from the back of the board. Each player threw two bags, weighing eight ounces (230 g) each, "in succession". The boards in bean-bag bull's-eye were placed "about 30 ft . [9 m] apart for adults, 10 ft . [3 m] for kids." Scoring was essentially the same as that used in cornhole (three points for a bag in the hole, one point for a bag remaining on the board) and also used cancellation scoring.

In the Chicago area, a similar game is referred to as "bags" or "bean bags", but uses rectangular bags. The game spread in Chicago, Illinois, and the Northwest region of Indiana in the late 1970s and early 1980s, perhaps due to the Popular Mechanics article mentioned above. Cornhole as it is now known originated and gained popularity on Cincinnati's west side (near Ferguson Avenue) in the 1980s and spread to surrounding areas in Kentucky and Southeast Indiana.

=== Tournaments ===
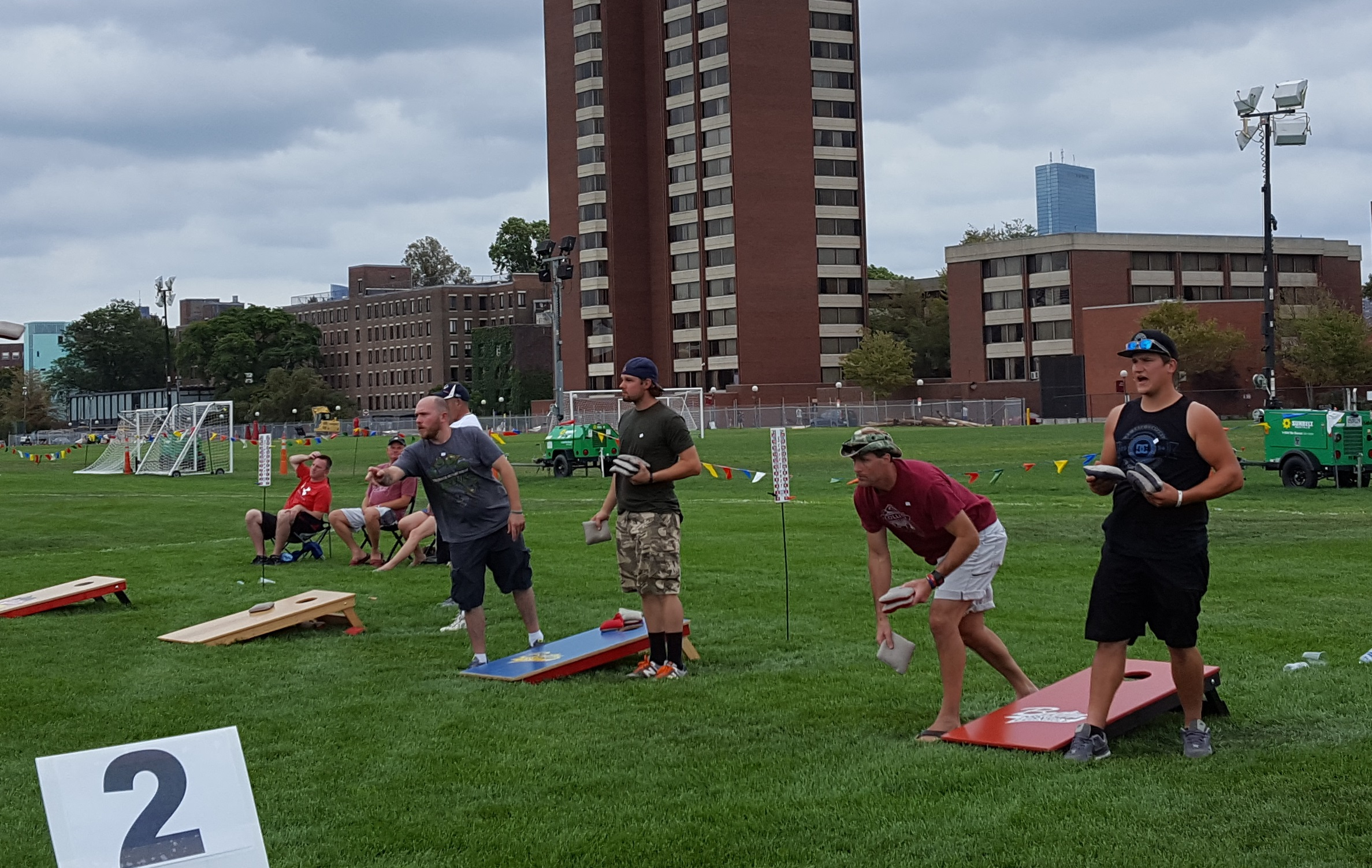
The Collier Cornhole Tournament, held on the campus of the Massachusetts Institute of Technology

The American Cornhole Organization (ACO) was established in 2005 by Frank Geers and is headquartered in Milford, Ohio. The ACO claims on its website to be the "governing body for the sport of cornhole".

The American Cornhole League (ACL) was founded in 2015 by Stacey Moore. According to the ACL's website, it promotes and develops cornhole as a sport on every level, and created software and apps to manage cornhole leagues, tournaments, special events, and player development.

The American Cornhole Association (ACA) is an organization whose sole mission is to help cornhole players enjoy the game of cornhole. According to its website, "[o]ne of the most important ways to achieve this goal is for people to have high-quality equipment to play on." Accordingly, the ACA is largely focused on selling cornhole-related products and equipment rather than acting as a sanctioning body of the sport; however, it does have its own rules and does sponsor events.

The United Kingdom Cornhole League (UKCL) was founded in 2021 by Daniel Lilley. It promotes competitive tournaments across the United Kingdom and develops cornhole as a sport.

== Rules and format ==
=== Equipment and court layout ===
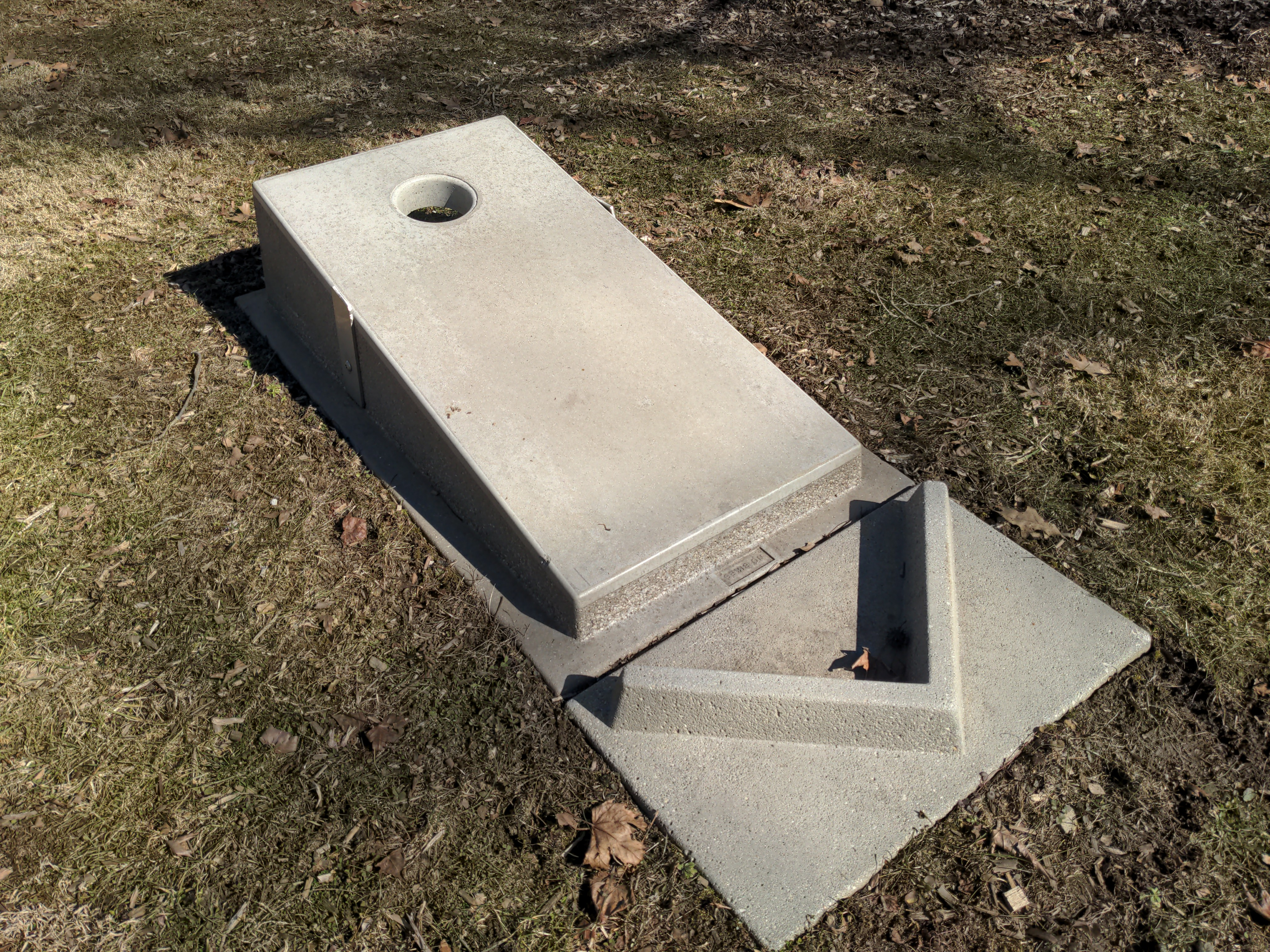
A concrete cornhole board installed at a park in Pennsylvania

Cornhole matches are played with two sets of four bags (eight total), two boards and two, four, or eight players.

There are four bags in a set. Each set of bags should be distinguishable from the other, usually by using different colors. The American Cornhole League's rules call for double-seamed fabric bags measuring 6 by 6 inches (150 by 150 mm) and weighing 15.5 to 16.5 ounces (440 to 470 g). Although bags used to be filled with preserved corn kernels (hence "cornhole") or dried beans, the American Cornhole Organization developed bags filled with plastic resin or other materials that will maintain a consistent weight and shape over many throws without deforming. Bags are usually dual-sided, with each side of the bag being a different material that can affect grip and react faster or slower on the board's surface. Faster bags are often preferred in humid conditions when bags will not slide as readily. Additionally, professional players may opt for different materials depending on their personal throwing styles. Players with a lower, faster throw may use more rotation and prefer a slower bag material, whereas players with higher, slower throws may use less rotation and prefer a more reactive bag.

As per the American Cornhole Organization Rules, each board is 2 by 4 feet (0.61 by 1.22 m), with a 6-inch-diameter (15 cm) hole. The hole's center is positioned 9 inches (230 mm) down from the center of the top edge of the board. Each board is angled with the top edge of the playing surface 12 inches (300 mm) above the ground, and the bottom edge 3–4 inches (76–102 mm) above the ground. A standard court places the two boards 33 feet (10 m) or 27 feet (8.2 m) apart, measuring from the bottom edge of the boards. Different (usually shorter) distances may be used if space is limited or if younger players are participating. Some smaller versions of the game, with scaled-down boards, bags, and holes are available specifically for children.

The areas immediately to the left and right of the boards are the pitcher's boxes. The line (either drawn or imaginary) extending from the bottom edge of the board in both the left and right direction is the foul line. When throwing the bags, players cannot step past the foul line or else the throw does not count.

=== Gameplay ===
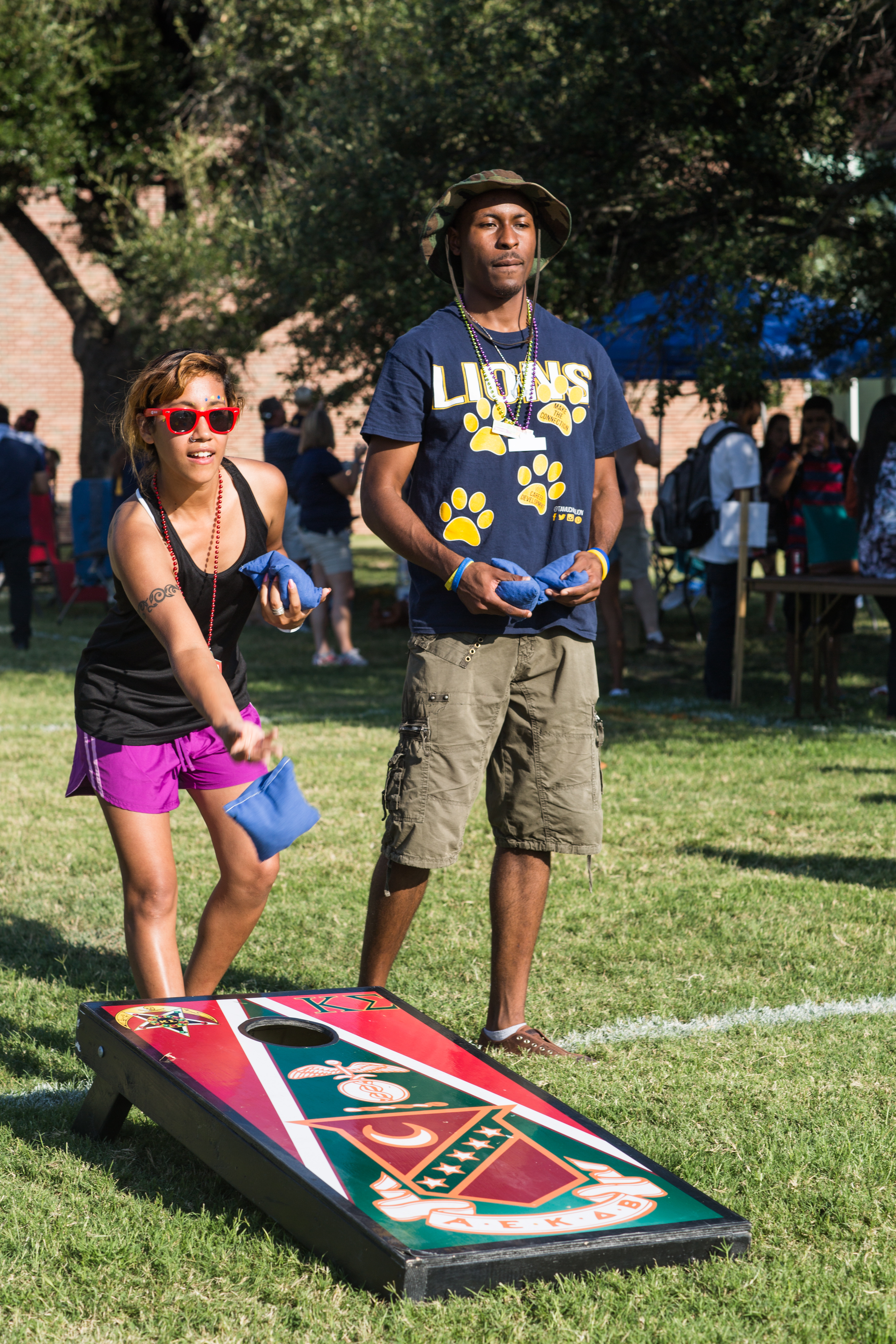
Cornhole being played during a pre-game tailgate party at Texas A&M University–Commerce. The player behind the board is not conforming to standard rules for official gameplay because she is not throwing the bag from inside either pitcher's box.

A cornhole match is separated into innings (or frames). During each inning, each player or team will throw their designated four bags. The manner in which the bags are thrown depends on which format of cornhole is being played: singles (1 vs. 1), doubles (2 vs. 2), or crew (4 vs. 4).

In singles (1 vs. 1), both players throw their four bags while standing on opposite sides of the same board (left vs. right pitcher's box), alternating throws between the two players. After all eight bags are thrown, both players walk to the opposite board, while remaining in their lane, to tally the score. To begin the next inning, both players turn around to throw at the other board in the same manner. The effect of this is that by always staying in their respective lane, the two players will alternate each inning throwing from the left vs. right pitcher's box.

In doubles (2 vs. 2), one partner from each team stands in the left pitcher's box of one board while the other partner stands in the right pitcher's box of the opposite board. Thus, each team's partners are on opposite ends, facing each other, both in the same lane. From here, gameplay is similar to singles: the two opponents at one board alternate throwing their four bags at the other board, after which a mid-inning score is tallied; then their partners at that board alternate throwing their team's four bags back at the other board, after which the final inning score can be tallied. In doubles, players may not change sides, i.e. one partner will throw from the left pitcher's box of one board and the other from the right pitcher's box of the other board for the entire game.

In the crew format (4 vs. 4), play is identical to doubles, but with two teammates at each of the two boards, one pair in the left pitcher's box of one board and the other pair in the right pitcher's box of the opposite board, each pair facing each other, in the same lane. Instead of each partner pitching four bags per inning (as in doubles), in crew each teammate pitches two bags per inning, again alternating throws both with the opposing team (as in singles and doubles) and with the player's teammate who is standing with them at the same board.

Note that in doubles and crew, the score for any inning is based on eight throws per team, as opposed to four throws per player in singles.

In all formats, the pitcher must throw the bag within 20 seconds. The time begins when the pitcher is inside the pitcher's box with an intent to throw. The first pitch of an inning goes to whichever player or team scored in the previous inning. If neither player or team scored in the previous inning, then whichever pitched first in the previous inning will again pitch first in the next inning. The first pitch of the first inning can be decided by a coin toss.

A legal pitch must be tossed while the pitcher's feet are within the pitcher's box. If the pitcher begins the throw with a foot beyond the foul line or otherwise steps beyond the foul line before releasing the bag, the pitch is a foul and does not count. A foul throw cannot be re-taken and the bag is removed from play before continuing. If a foul bag moves other bags in the field of play, those bags are returned to their prior position before continuing, including if a bag was moved into the hole. If a bag lands only partially on the board and is also touching the ground, it does not count and is removed before continuing.

=== Scoring ===
To score points, bags must be on the surface of the board or fall through the hole. To score three points, a bag may fall directly into the hole, slide into the hole after hitting the board, or be knocked into the hole by another bag. A bag remaining on the board scores one point. A bag partially on the board and partially on the ground ("dirt bag") does not count and should be removed before the next throw.

In cornhole, cancellation scoring is used. When the scores are tallied at the end of an inning, whichever player or team scores higher is awarded points equal to the difference between both sides. For example, if Team A scores 12 points in an inning and Team B scores 10 points, then Team A is awarded two points (12 minus 10); whereas if Team A and Team B both score 12 points, the difference is zero, and no one scores. Play continues until one player or team reaches or exceeds 21 points at the end of an inning. By using cancellation scoring, it is only possible for one side (or neither side) to score in any inning, so match ties are impossible.

Different variations in scoring or house rules are sometimes used. Sometimes, a bag hanging over the hole, but which has not fallen through, is scored as two points. Other variations (such as British rules) include requiring one team to reach exactly 21 points without going over to win. If a team exceeds 21 points after an inning (called "busting"), different punishments might be used such as automatically returning to 15 points, returning to the team's prior score, returning to the prior score minus one, etc. In some versions, if a team "busts" three times, their opponents automatically win the match.

=== Strategy ===
Gameplay strategy varies by player and skill level. At the professional level, players can easily slide all four bags into the hole if no bag blocks the path. Defensive strategies are often employed to slow down gameplay or force opponents to make difficult decisions. Defensive plays might include throwing a blocker bag that rests in front of the hole, thereby forcing an opponent to either slide through the blocker bag to reach the hole, throw another blocker behind the bag, or attempt a risky airmail shot over the bag aiming directly for the hole without touching the board. Bags can be made out of different materials to help strategies such as the blocker bag be easier to execute.

There are many types of shots that players use depending on the situation. The slide shot is one of the most basic shots and is when a bag lands on the bottom two thirds of the board and slides into the hole. Another shot used is the blocker bag as mentioned above along with an airmail. A more complicated shot is the bully bag where a player will push their opponent's bag away from the hole either to the left or right, while keeping their own bag in line with the hole making it difficult for the opponent to get their bag into the hole. The rolling shot is another technique that allows the player to "rollover" any bags blocking the hole such as a blocker, although this shot is more complicated.

Practicing and perfecting these shots allows players to be prepared and ready for any strategies their opponents throw at them. Knowing when to utilize each shot is an important part of the game and can help aid players of all skill levels.

=== Competitive player ranking ===
The American Cornhole Organization ranks amateur and professional cornhole players through their World Rankings. Players are world ranked by division, including Singles, Doubles, Women, Seniors and Juniors.

The American Cornhole League ranks their players based on points earned through local and regional tournaments. The points earned per tournament are based on the level of play. These levels include open, advanced, competitive, intermediate and novice with open providing the most points based on placement. Points are also used to determine the pros of the ACL.

== World Cup / International competition ==
Since 2023, the World Cornhole Organization (WCO) has organised an annual international tournament, the WCO World Cup, to crown a world champion national team.

Edition	Location (Host)	Winner	Runner-up / 2nd place
2023	Paris, France (Charlety Stadium)	United States	Canada
2024	Trier, Germany	United States	Canada
2025	Poreč, Croatia	United States	Slovenia

As of 2025 the 2025 World Cup in Poreč featured 26 countries from four continents, making it the largest Cornhole World Cup in history. In the 2025 final, Team USA won the title after a dramatic match against Slovenia.

The establishment of the WCO and its World Cup marks a shift of Cornhole from a regional pastime — especially in North America — toward a structured, global competition with standardized rules and growing international participation.

== Terminology ==
The following is a list of terms commonly used in cornhole:

- Airmail: a bag that does not slide or bounce on the board but goes directly into the hole, usually over an opponent's blocker bag.
- Back door, jumper, dirty rollup: a bag that goes over the top of a blocker and into the hole.
- Backstop: a bag that lands past the hole but remains on the board creating a backboard for a slider to knock into without going off the board.
- Blocker: a bag that lands in front of the hole, blocking the hole from an opponent's slide shot.
- Busting: an unofficial rule that sends a player's score back down to a predetermined number if their score at the end of an inning exceeds 21.
- Cornfusion: when players or teams cannot agree on the scoring of an inning.
- Cornhole: a bag that falls in the hole and is worth three points. Also known as a Drano, named for a drain-clearing product;
- Dirt bag: a bag that is on the ground or is hanging off the board and touching the ground.
- Frame: an inning, a single round during which a player or team and their opponent(s) all throw their bags.
- Four-bagger: when a single player gets four bags in the hole in a single round. The bags can be knocked or pushed in by a player as well as their opponent as long as all four of the player's bags go in the hole.
- Grand bag: when a player makes all four bags in the hole directly, one after another, during an inning; differs from a four-bagger in that a bag is not later knocked from the board's surface into the hole during the inning.
- Flop bag, floppy bag: type of toss that does not spin the bag horizontally or vertically, a bag without rotation or spin.
- Hammer: when one or more hangers (see below) are around the hole, a hammer can be used; a hammer is a bag thrown as an airmail bag with a high arc in an attempt to move hanger bags into the hole along with it.
- Hanger: a bag on the lip of the hole close to falling in.
- Honors: the player or team who tosses first, resulting from the team scoring in the previous inning or winning the coin toss before the first inning.
- Hooker: a bag that hits the board and while hooking or curving around a blocker goes into the hole.
- Jumper: a bag that strikes another bag on the board causing it to jump up and into the hole.
- Push, wash: when each player or team obtains an identical score in an inning resulting in no overall score change.
- Short bag: when a bag lands on the ground just before the board.
- Skunk, whitewash, shutout: a game that ends in a score of 21 (or more) to zero; by some unofficial rules a game may be called once a shutout score of at least 11–0 is reached.
- Slide, slider: a bag that lands in front of the hole and slides in.
- Swish: a bag that goes directly in the hole without touching the board (see also: "airmail").
- Woody: any bag that has been pitched and remains on the board's surface at the end of the inning (scoring one point).

== See also ==
- Croquet
- Ladder toss
- Lawn darts
- Mölkky
- Muckers
- Tejo
- Washer pitching
