= Trangleball =

Trangleball is an all terrain sport. It is played using a 3-sided pyramid. Around the pyramid is a field made up of two circles: an inner circle with a radius of 7.5 feet, and an outer circle with a radius of 14 feet. In each of the 3 sectors are 2 opponents who must throw the ball on the pyramid so that the other players will catch not it. Bursts of lateral movement are necessary to throw and catch the ball. Trangleball is a team sport, as is captured by its slogan, "There Is No "i" in Trangleball... It Is a Team Sport."

The game can be played 1 on 1, 2 on 2, or 3 on 3.

Trangleball was founded by Mark Miller in Fire Island, New York.
