= Polish horseshoes =

Game of throwing a frisbee to knock over a bottle

Polish horseshoes (also called Spanish horseshoes, frisbeener in the Midwest, French darts in Virginia, frisnok in Manitoba, and beersbee elsewhere in Canada) is an outdoor game played between two teams of two people using a frisbee, two glass bottles or cans, and stakes, ski poles or hiking sticks hammered into the ground. The game is played by the players taking turns throwing a frisbee at a glass bottle that rests on top of the stakes in the ground. The two stakes are placed anywhere between 20 and 40 ft (6.1 and 12.2 m) apart. Players must hold a drink in one hand at all times, leaving only one hand free for throwing and catching.

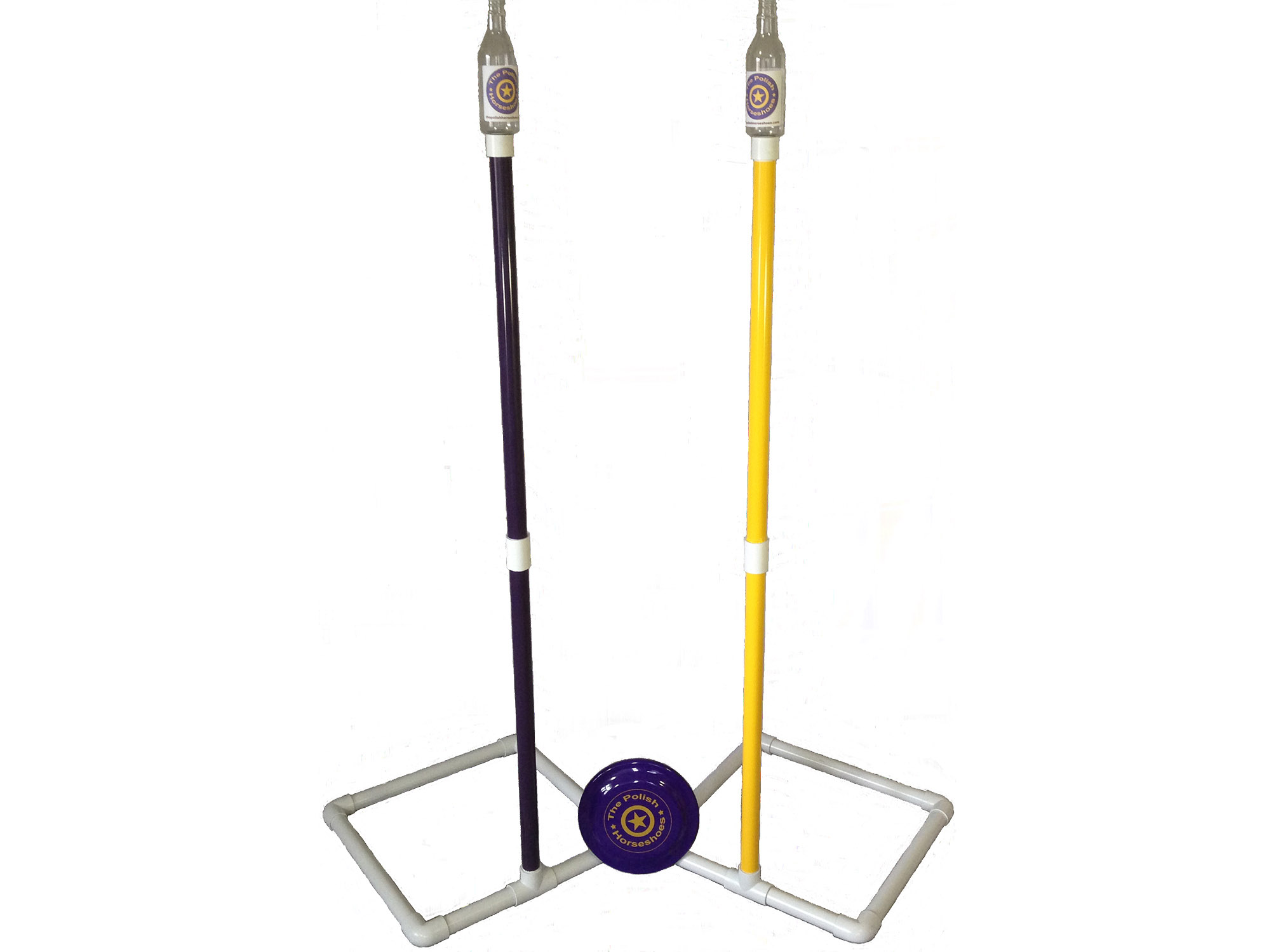
A Polish Horseshoes Set

== Play ==
The game begins with some kind of fair settlement between each team to decide who starts first. The first team tosses the frisbee, aiming it towards a glass bottle that is placed on top of the stake opposite them. Then the other team throws the frisbee at the first team's bottle. Points are scored when the frisbee hits the stake or the bottle, when the bottle is knocked off the stake and hits the ground, or when the receiving team fails to catch the frisbee. Play continues until one team has reached a set number of points (typically 21), beating their opponent by at least two points.

== Scoring ==
The object of Polish horseshoes is to knock the glass bottle off the stake either by hitting it directly or by hitting the stake. If the disc hits the stake and the bottle is knocked off, then one point is scored unless the bottle is caught before it hits the ground. If the disc hits the bottle directly and the bottle is knocked off, then two points are scored if the bottle hits the ground and only one point if the bottle is caught before it hits the ground.

In addition, the disc itself must be caught after every throw. Failure by the defending team to do so earns the throwing team one point. If the disc is uncatchable, then no points are awarded. The disc is deemed uncatchable if it hits the ground before getting to the stake; if the angle between the disc and the ground is more than 30 degrees (this is called a 'blade'); if it's outside of arm's reach within one step (if the catching team must take more than one large step to catch the disc with their free hand); or if it is above the catcher's fingertips when they hold their hand as high as they can, standing straight up. Also, if the disc hits the stake below knee height or if it hits the stake after hitting the ground, the disc is deemed uncatchable, and the throw is invalid (no points are awarded even if the bottle is knocked off).

The disc cannot be caught before it has passed the pole. If it is, the team that threw is awarded three points, under the assumption that they possibly could have earned a full three points if the catching team had not interfered prematurely. Because of this rule, it is common for players to stand just a step or two back from the pole as to eliminate any early catches.

Another commonly observed rule (albeit optional) is that a catch does not count if the catcher spills their drink. If the defending team catches the object, but the player who caught the disc spills a significant amount of their drink, the catch is not counted and the throwing team wins one point for the disc hitting the ground.

Scoring examples: If a thrower hits the bottle directly and the defenders fail to catch both the bottle and the disc, the throwing team earns three points, one for the bottle hitting the ground, one for the disc hitting the ground, and one for hitting the bottle directly. If the defending team catches both the bottle and the disc, the throwing team only gets the one point (for hitting the bottle). If the disc hits the stake rather than the bottle, then one point is scored for each object that hits the ground (the bottle and/or the disc). If the defending team catches both, then no points are scored. If the bottle is not dislodged, but the receiving team fails to catch the disc, the throwing team gets one point.

== See also ==
- Lawn game
- Flying disc games
