= KanJam =

Flying disc game

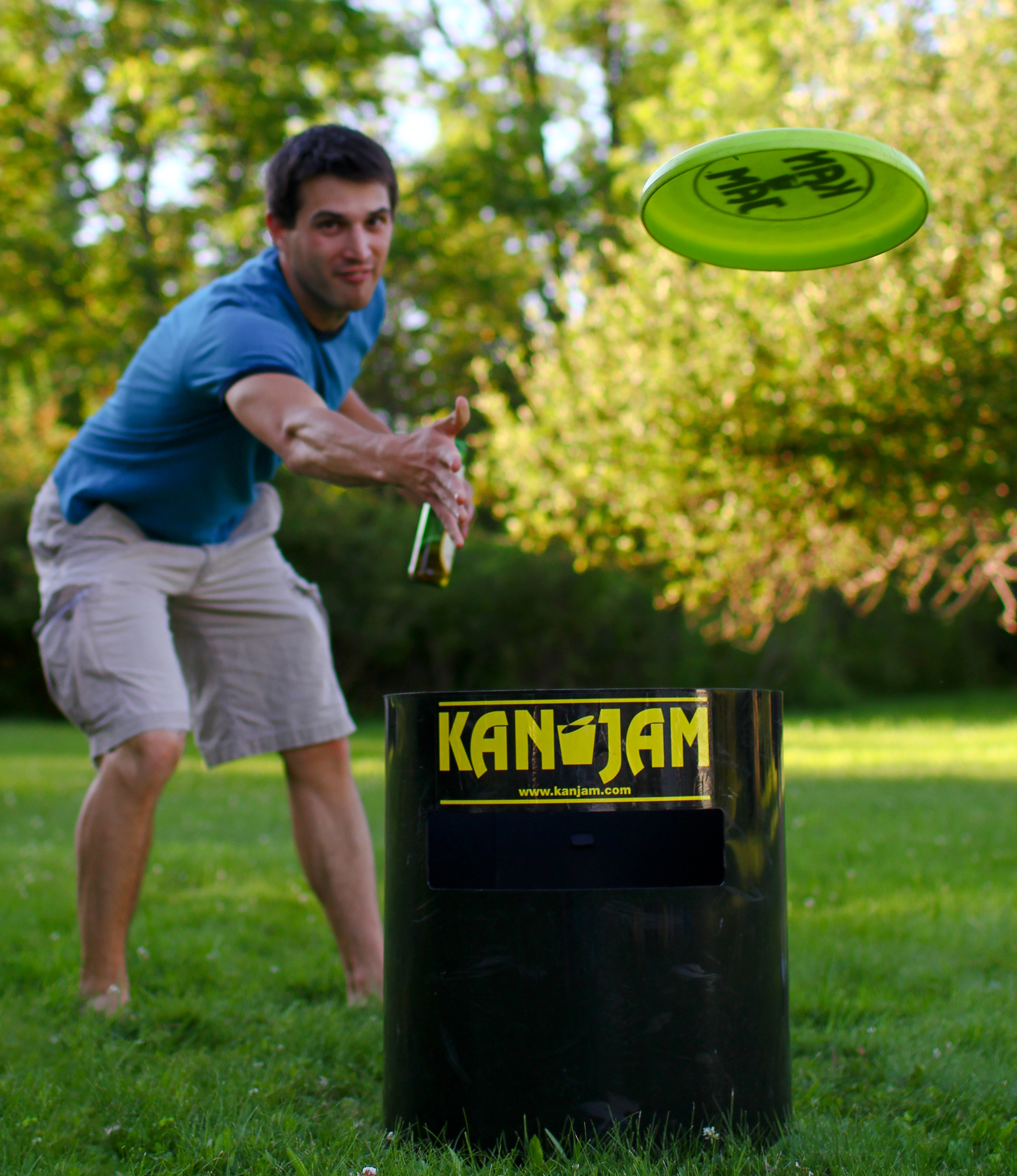
A Kan Jam game

Kan Jam (sometimes spelled kanjam, KanJam, or Kan-Jam) is a flying disc game, played with a flying disc and two cans into which players deflect the disc. Teams of two players take turns tossing a disc between two plastic cans, scoring points if the disc hits or is deflected into one of the cans. The game is played to a target score of exactly 21, but a team can also win if a player throws the disc through the slot or top of a can without the help of their teammate.

Kan Jam was developed in Western New York and is now played worldwide.

== Origin ==
Kan Jam was created in the 1980s by Charles Sciandra and Paul Swisher in Buffalo, New York, originally being called "Garbage Can Frisbee". "Garbage Can Frisbee" was created in the late 1970s by Rob Mogensen, Joe Raymond, John Kopasz and Jim Heron, four friends from Tonawanda, NY. The game was started just by the four friends messing around, and throwing a disc into a garbage can. Sciandra and Swisher were introduced to "Garbage Can Frisbee" by a common friend to the game's originators. The originators were recognized by Sciandra and Swisher at several of the Kan Jam World Championship events. The game was mostly played locally in the Buffalo area until the mid 1990s, when Sciandra and Swisher established a company and adapted the original "Garbage Can Frisbee" to Kan Jam. The developers sought a patent for the concept but ran into problems distinguishing it from other pre-existing games—most notably the game of Tiddlywinks—although this obstacle was overcome through the introduction of the "instant win" feature. After several years of development, a patent was granted and Kan Jam went on sale in 2005.

Sales started after the developers were able to sell the game to schools in North Tonawanda, the district in which Swisher works as a science teacher, as part of their physical education program. In 2006, Swisher sold his share to Mitchel Rubin. Sciandra and Rubin reorganized the company and founded Kan Jam LLC, made the game more retail- and user-friendly, and began selling games from their basement. By 2007, approximately 14,000 units were sold. They moved their operation to a larger facility.

Kan Jam is now played in all 50 states, across Canada, the Caribbean, Australia, New Zealand, across Europe and many other countries around the world.

Variations of the original game include Kan Jam Mini and Kan Jam Splash. Kan Jam Mini is designed to be played indoors or out, on table tops, the floor and anywhere it fits. The Kan Jam Mini has a smaller goal and disc than the original game. Kan Jam Splash is designed to be played in water and has a buoyant base. The Kan Jam Splash also has a smaller sized goal and disc. In 2017, Kan Jam released "Kan Jam Hard Count", a football game designed and created by collaborators PJ Tudisco and Andy Wheeler. Kan Jam Hard Count has elements of football, Ultimate Frisbee and basketball using two cone-shaped goals as the scoring vessels. The game is played in a 20 yard space and incorporates passing, catching and route running. KJ Hard Count is fast paced and is cardiovascularly intense.

In 2018, Sciandra and Rubin sold a majority stake in KanJam LLC to a consortium of private equity firms. Under the terms of the sale, the two will remain executives with the company, retain minority stakes in the corporation and ensure that the game remains manufactured by Western New York factories.

== Rules ==
The object of the game is to score points by throwing and deflecting the flying disc and hitting or entering the goal. The game ends when a team scores exactly 21 points or "chogs" the disc for an instant win. A team must get exactly 21 points to win. If a throw raises a team's score above 21, the points from that throw are deducted from the team's score. For example, if a team has 20 points, and a teammate redirects the disc into the kan for a 3-point bucket, their score is reduced to 17 points. In the event of a tie (both teams have 21 points at the end of a round), additional rounds are played until one team has more points than the other at the end of a round.

A coin toss or similar procedure is used to determine which team goes first. The game is broken up into turns, with an equal number of turns for each team. However, this does not apply in the case of an instant win. The goals ("kans") are spaced approximately 50 feet apart. A team consists of two people each standing at opposing ends of the playing field. One player throws the disc, while the other acts as the "deflector," who is free to move anywhere, unlike the thrower, but the deflector may not catch, carry, or double hit the disc. The original deflector then throws the disc back to the original thrower from his end in order to score, and then the next team takes their turn.

No points are awarded if the thrower goes over the line, or if the disc hits the ground before reaching the goal.

Points are awarded for a dinger, when the flying disc is deflected by your partner into the side of the kan (1 point), a deuce (a.k.a. "direct hit" or "direct"), when the flying disc hits the side of the kan without help from the deflector (2 points), or a bucket, when the flying disc is deflected through the top or into the front slot (3 points). In addition, when a player throws the disc into the middle of the kan through the front slot or the top without help from the deflector the disc must stay in the bucket, they score an instant win.

=== Perfect game ===
A perfect game occurs when one team reaches the 21 points in only 7 shots. This would require the team to score all 3-point or bucket shots. A perfect game can be overthrown if The Hammer (on the opposing team) throws the last shot as an instant win. If this happens there is no longer a perfect game. A perfect game also does not count if the opposing team keeps up the momentum and also scores 7 bucket shots which will send the game into overtime.

== Tournaments ==
There are two official Kan Jam Tournaments, the World Championship, and the Klassic. The Klassic has been played every year since 2004, the World Championship since 1990. The World Championship is held in North Tonawanda, NY, on the 2nd Saturday of August. Notable teams include Dorkus Malorkus, who have won four championships and four Klassics, Rebel Survivors who have won three championships and three Klassics, and Sole Survivors who have won three championships and two Klassics. 2014's championship was won by "Stallion Survivors". Ross Urugbezi was the 2019 KanJam World champion after beating 31 other competitors.

The most notable local league is called Woodbridge PDFA (formally known as KanJam Woodbridge). The initial season was held in 2019. The 732 Boyz won with members Kevin Lynch and Joe Dunn. Following the 2019 season, the league was canceled due to the COVID-19 pandemic. In 2021, Free Jamples won. In 2022, the American Lovers defeated the 732 Boyz for their first Championship. The 2023 tournament is set for August 27, 2023.
