= Lawn darts =

Lawn game using large darts

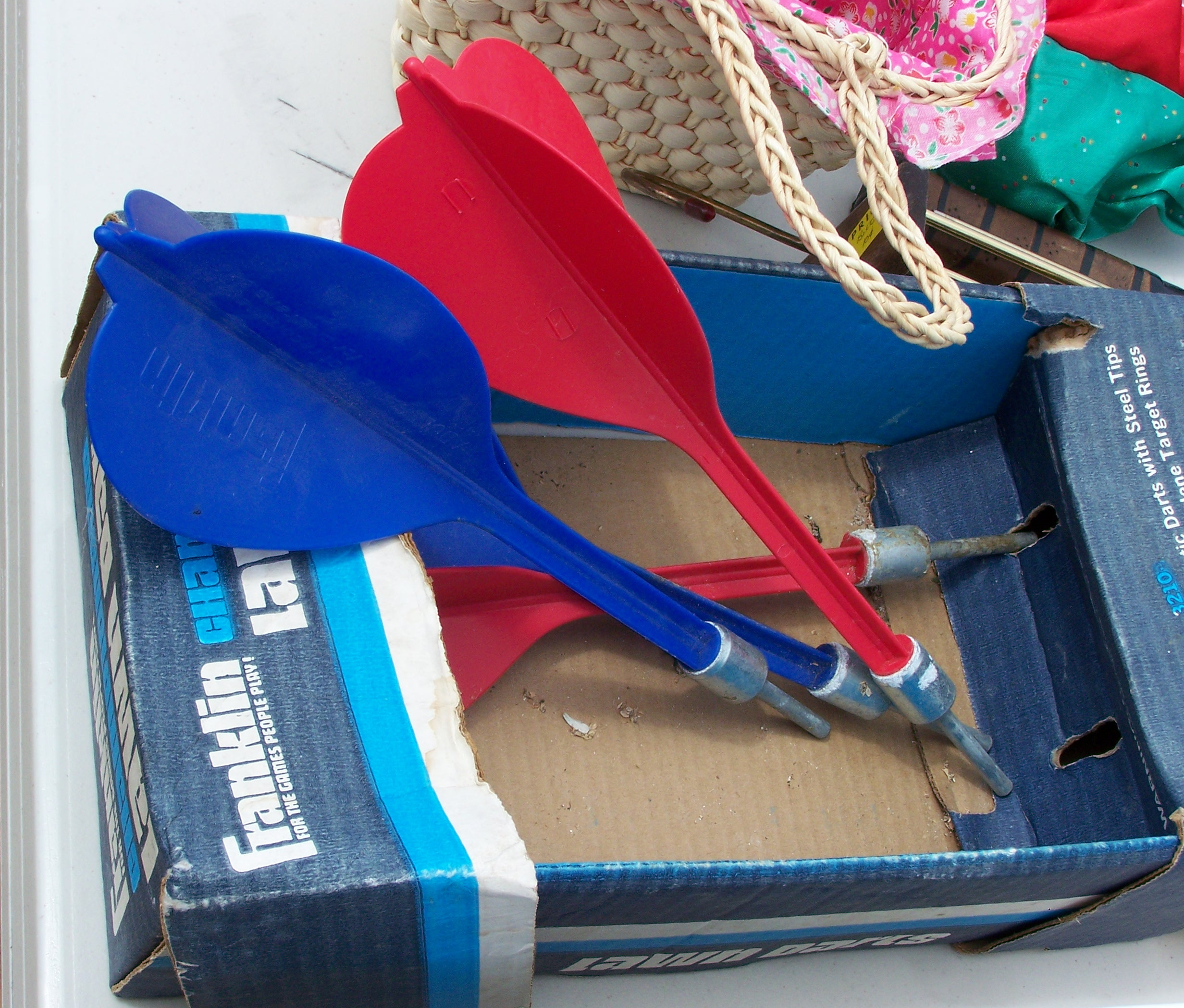
A package of lawn darts with metal tips

Lawn darts (also known as javelin darts, Jarts, lawn jarts, or yard darts) is a lawn game for two players or teams. A lawn dart set usually includes four large darts and two targets. The gameplay and objective are similar to those of both horseshoes and darts. The darts are typically 12 inches (30 cm) in length with a weighted metal or plastic tip on one end and three plastic fins on a rod at the other end. The darts are intended to be tossed underhand toward a horizontal ground target, where the weighted end hits first and sticks into the ground. The target is typically a plastic ring, and landing anywhere within the ring scores a point.

In the second half of the 20th century, the safety of metal-tipped lawn darts was called into question in several countries. After thousands of injuries and at least three children's deaths were attributed to lawn darts, the sharp-pointed darts were banned for sale in the United States and Canada. They are still used in the European Union; however, the tips are rounded instead of being sharp, and they are often magnetic, so the darts can stick to a magnet.

== Safety and bans in the U.S. and Canada ==
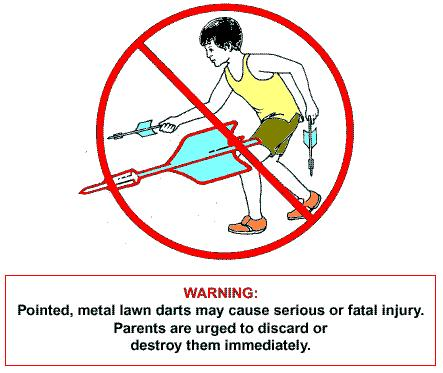
Image from U.S. Consumer Product Safety Commission notice

In 1970, the U.S. Food and Drug Administration (FDA) classified sharp-pointed lawn darts as a "mechanical hazard". This designation prohibited the sale of lawn darts unless the darts: (1) were packaged with a warning label that advised of the potential for serious injury, and cautioned parents to keep the product out of the reach of children; (2) included instructions on usage with warnings to avoid use when other persons or animals are within the field of play, and (3) were not sold in toy stores or toy departments.

The Consumers Union and the Children's Foundation petitioned the Department of Health, Education, and Welfare (HEW) to use the emergency provisions of the Child Protection and Toy Safety Act of 1969 to ban outright "outdoor games with 13‐inch pointed darts weighing more than five ounces each." When HEW refused, Consumers Union sued to instruct HEW to enact the ban. In 1970 a federal judge ruled in favor of HEW.

Between 1980 and 1988, 6,100 Americans had visited hospital emergency rooms as a result of lawn dart accidents. Of that total, 81% were 15 or younger, and half were 10 or younger. On April 5, 1987, seven-year-old Michele Snow was killed when a dart thrown by her brother's playmate penetrated her skull and caused fatal brain trauma. The darts were purchased as part of a set of various lawn games and had never been played before the incident occurred. Snow's father David began to advocate for a ban on lawn darts, claiming that there was no way to keep children from accessing lawn darts short of a full ban. As a partial result of Snow's lobbying, in 1988 the U.S. Consumer Product Safety Commission introduced an outright ban on lawn darts in the U.S. During the week when the commission voted to ban the product, an 11-year-old girl in Tennessee was hit by a lawn dart and fell into a coma. In 1997, the CPSC issued a reminder and warned parents to dispose of old sets after a 7-year-old boy in Elkhart, Indiana was injured when a dart from an old lawn dart set pierced his skull.

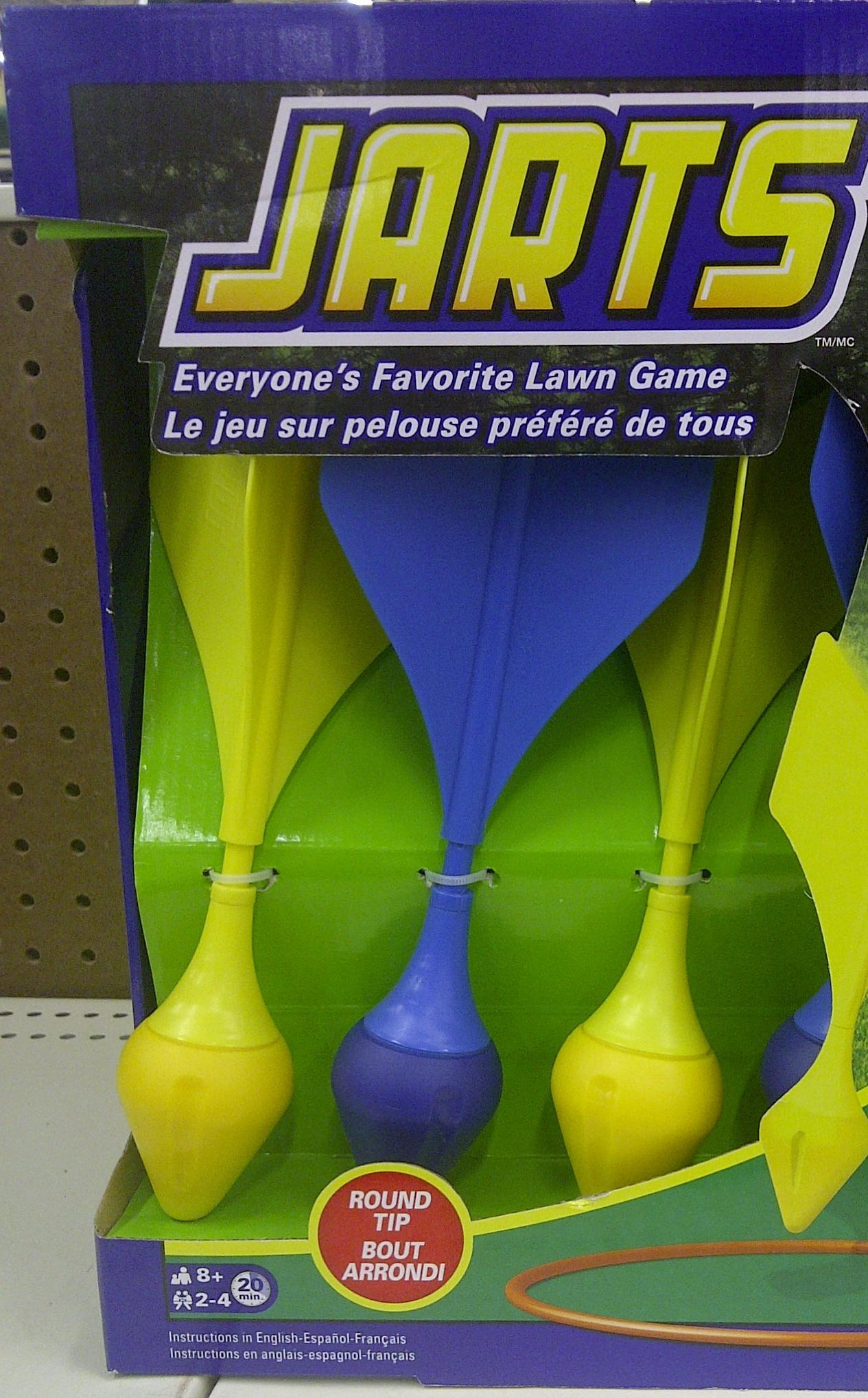
Darts with plastic tips

In Canada, lawn darts had caused at least 55 serious injuries by the time they were banned for sale in July 1989. The sale of second-hand lawn darts is also illegal under the Hazardous Products Act. Since then, alternatives made of plastic are available for sale in Canada, and a modified version of lawn darts with a blunt-tip design may be purchased in the United States.

== Rules ==
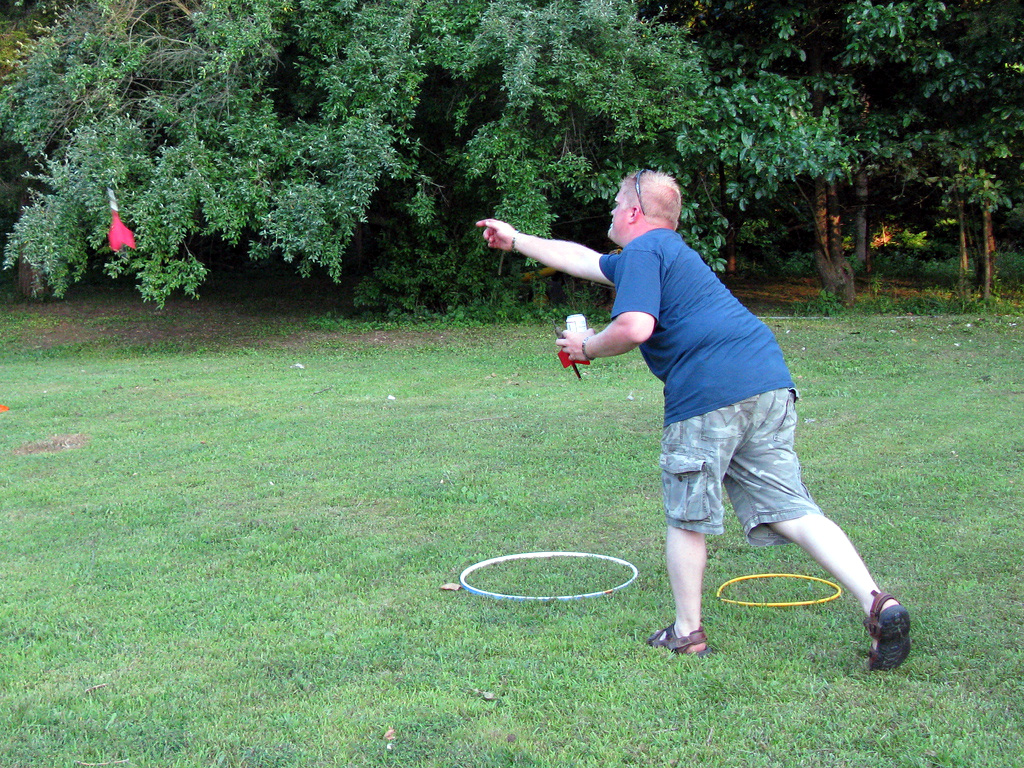
A man throwing lawn darts

The game may be played with standard or Handly Cup rules. Either variation can be played one-on-one or by teams of two. In the team versions, the players stand with one member from each team at each end (they should be sure to stand well back when the other side is throwing) and toss the darts to a target about 35 feet (11 m) away (with variation based on the players' skill and the location of the game).

In standard gameplay, points are scored when a dart lands in the target area. Usually if players from both teams land darts in the target, the scores cancel each other. For example, if Team A lands two darts in the target area and Team B lands one, Team A would get one point and Team B would get zero. Some versions of lawn darts include a smaller bullseye ring for additional points.

With the Handly Cup style, scores are based on darts in the ring plus darts closer to the ring than any of the opposing team's darts. Darts landing inside the ring, or "ringers", are worth three points each, and can be canceled by darts thrown by opponents that also land in the ring. Any dart that is closer to, but outside, the ring than any other dart thrown by the opposing team is worth one point. This means that if neither team managed to place a dart into the ring, but Team A landed two darts closer than did any of Team B's darts, Team A would score two points. If Team A landed one dart in the ring, and one dart closer than any of Team B's darts, Team A would score four points. If both teams land darts in the ring, it is impossible for a dart outside the ring to score any points, as it is further from the ring than the opposing team's dart that is inside. If Team A and Team B each land a dart inside the ring, and Team A also lands a dart outside the ring, but closer to the ring than Team B's other dart, neither team would score any points for the round. Handly Cup style matches are typically played by teams of two, with the pairs alternating until one team's total score is 21 or more. For a point to count, the dart must stick into the ground.

== See also ==
- Lawn dart effect, an error that fighter pilots must avoid
- Plumbata, an ancient weapon resembling a lawn dart
- Khuru (sport)
- Toy safety § Lawn darts
