= Throwing sports =

Sports where an object is thrown

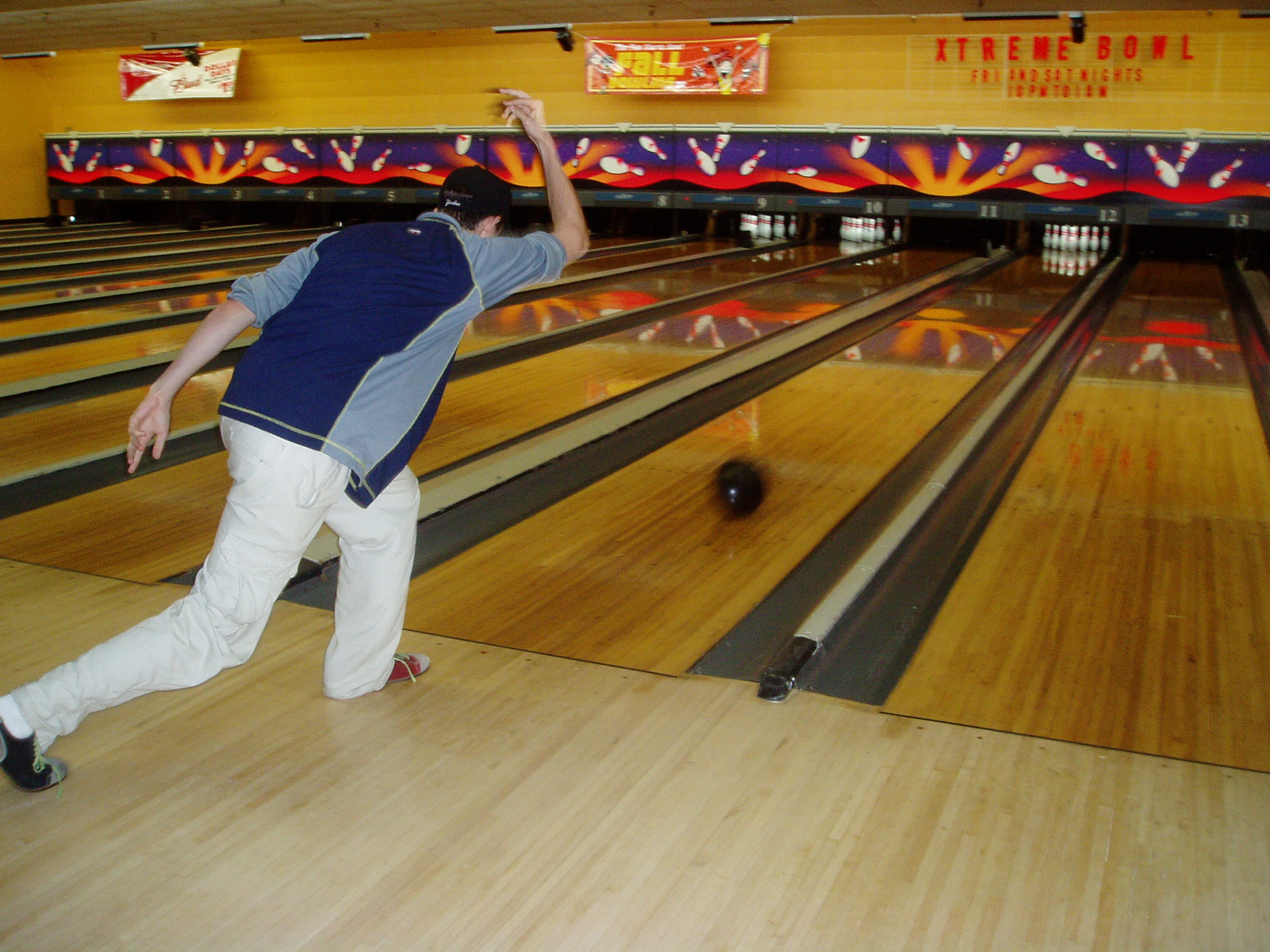
A man bowling a ball in tenpin bowling

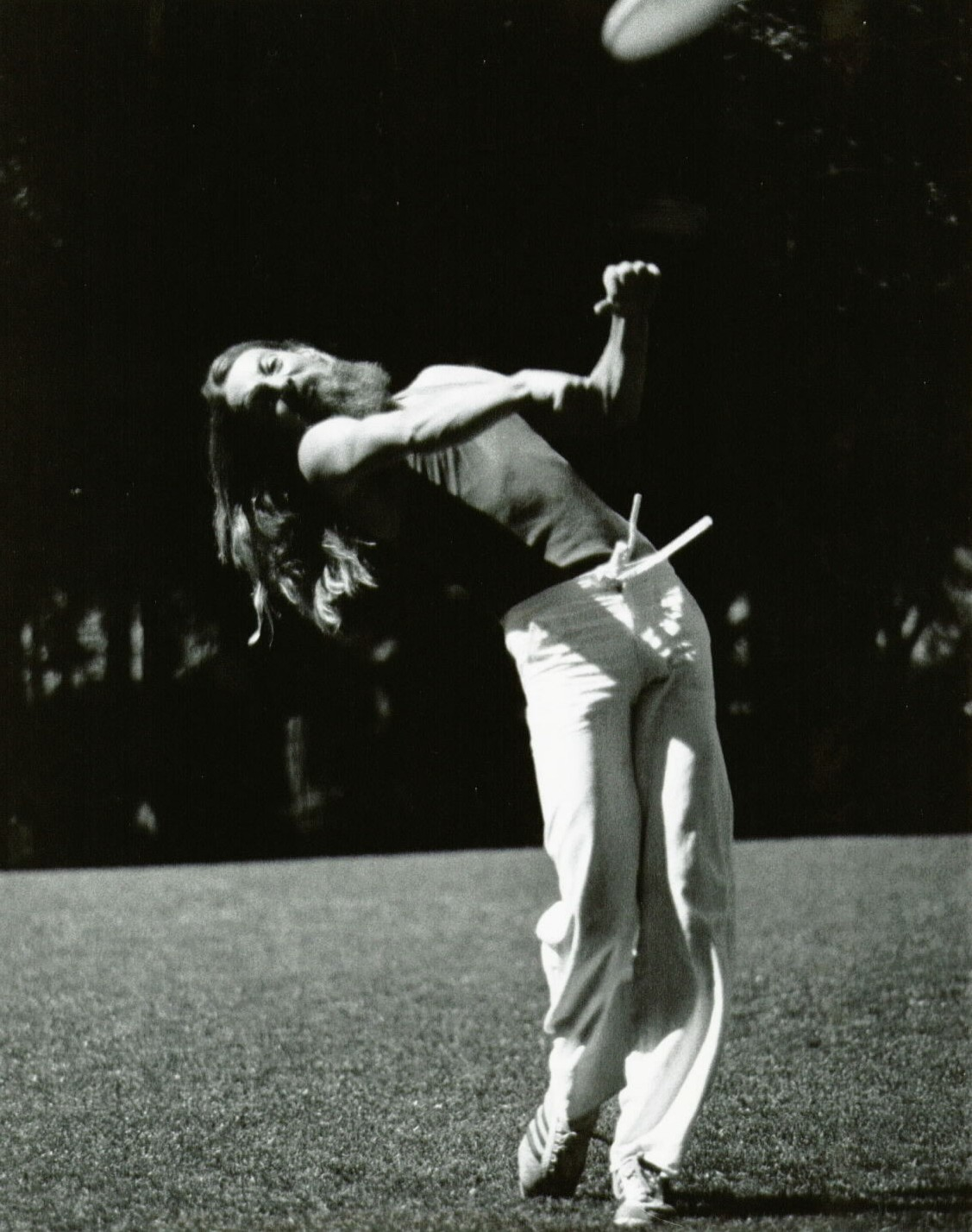
Ken Westerfield, side-arm (forehand) Frisbee distance throwing Record, 552'. Boulder, Colorado, 1978.

Throwing sports and throwing games are physical, human competitions where the outcome is measured by a player's ability to throw an object.

The two primary forms are throwing for distance and throwing at a given target or range. The four most prominent throwing for distance sports are in track and field: shot put, discus, javelin, and the hammer throw. Target-based sports have two main genres: bowling and darts, each of which have a great number of variations.

== History ==
Throwing sports have a long history. Modern track and field comes from a lineage of activities that dates to the Ancient Olympic Games. Artwork from Ancient Greece, in the form of friezes, pottery and statues, attests to the prominence of such sports in the society's physical culture. Antiphon describes phaininda (φαινίνδα) as an ancient Greek ball game in which the players deliberately tried to throw the ball to someone who was not expecting it.

Bowling games have similarly ancient roots. Games based on throwing stone balls in Ancient Egypt date to 5000 BCE, and a form of bocce is documented in Ancient Rome. The game of catch (throwing and catching an object between players) is among the most basic of all games and is a key component of many modern, complex sports and games. Its dodgeball variant is a basic throwing game where the opponent is the target.

Projectiles used in such sports are highly varied. Common projectile types include balls, darts, sticks, discs and rings. Formalised throwing sports often have strictly defined criteria for projectiles, such as a pre-determined size and weight. Less formalised games are usually not as strict and some games (for example, pitching pennies and horseshoes) incorporate everyday objects into the game, reflecting the simplistic roots of the pastimes.

Most throwing sports use a defined field of play (including an area players may throw an object from, and an area where the object should fall) and a specific throwing method. Common one-armed throwing methods include overhand throwing (releasing with the arm above the shoulder) and underarm throwing (releasing with the arm below the shoulder). With both arms, overhead throwing and chest-passing are common actions. The type of throw used is highly influenced by the properties of the projectile: small, heavy objects are held and pushed away from the body (e.g. shot put); handled objects are swung and released with one or two hands (e.g. weight throw, keg toss); smaller, lighter objects such as balls and darts tend to use an extended overarm technique where distance or speed is required, and an underarm technique where greater precision is required. In these sports, most throws are taken from a static position or limited area. However, some sports do include a short run-up to the throw line, for example javelin throw and tenpin bowling.

Standardised throwing sports typically have high-level competitions across regions and a sports governing body, with the most common and international varieties having a world championship and a professional circuit. Those that are less standardised in format tend not to have highly organised competition and instead are played in a more casual or social setting. Throwing games with prizes are common funfair and carnival games, with varieties including ring toss and coconut shy games.

The act of throwing is an element of many sports, particularly ball games – such as handball, basketball and codes of football – and bat-and-ball games, such as cricket and baseball. The throwing of an opponent is also a key feature of some martial arts and grappling sports. In these sports, the throwing aspect is just one part of a more complex system of rules. As throwing ability does not in itself determine the outcome, these are not strictly defined as throwing sports.

== List of throwing sports ==
=== Throwing for distance ===
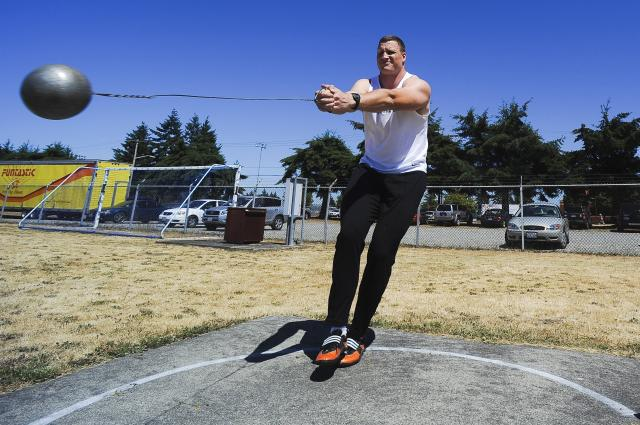
A man in the build-up phase of the hammer throw

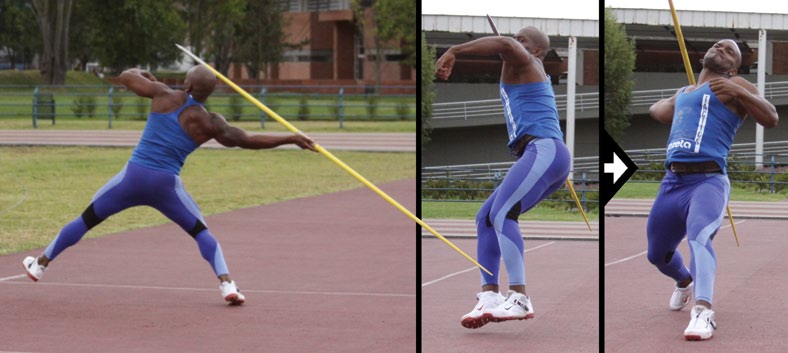
Phases of the javelin throw

- Track and field
  - Discus throw (Olympic sport)
  - Hammer throw (Olympic sport)
  - Javelin throw (Olympic sport)
  - Shot put (Olympic sport)
  - Weight throw (former Olympic sport)
  - Throws pentathlon – a combined track and field event comprising the above five events
  - Softball throw
  - Club throw (Paralympics)
- Frisbee
- Boomerang
- Dwarf-tossing
- Keg-tossing
- Mobile phone throwing
- Sheaf toss
- Stone put
- Steinstossen

==== Two-handed throwing ====
In events where one hand is used to throw the object, a "two-handed" contest may be staged wherein each competitor's score is the sum of the distance thrown with left and right hand. Such contests were staged at the 1912 Olympics (in discus, shot, and javelin) and at the Women's World Games in the 1920s.

=== Target sports ===
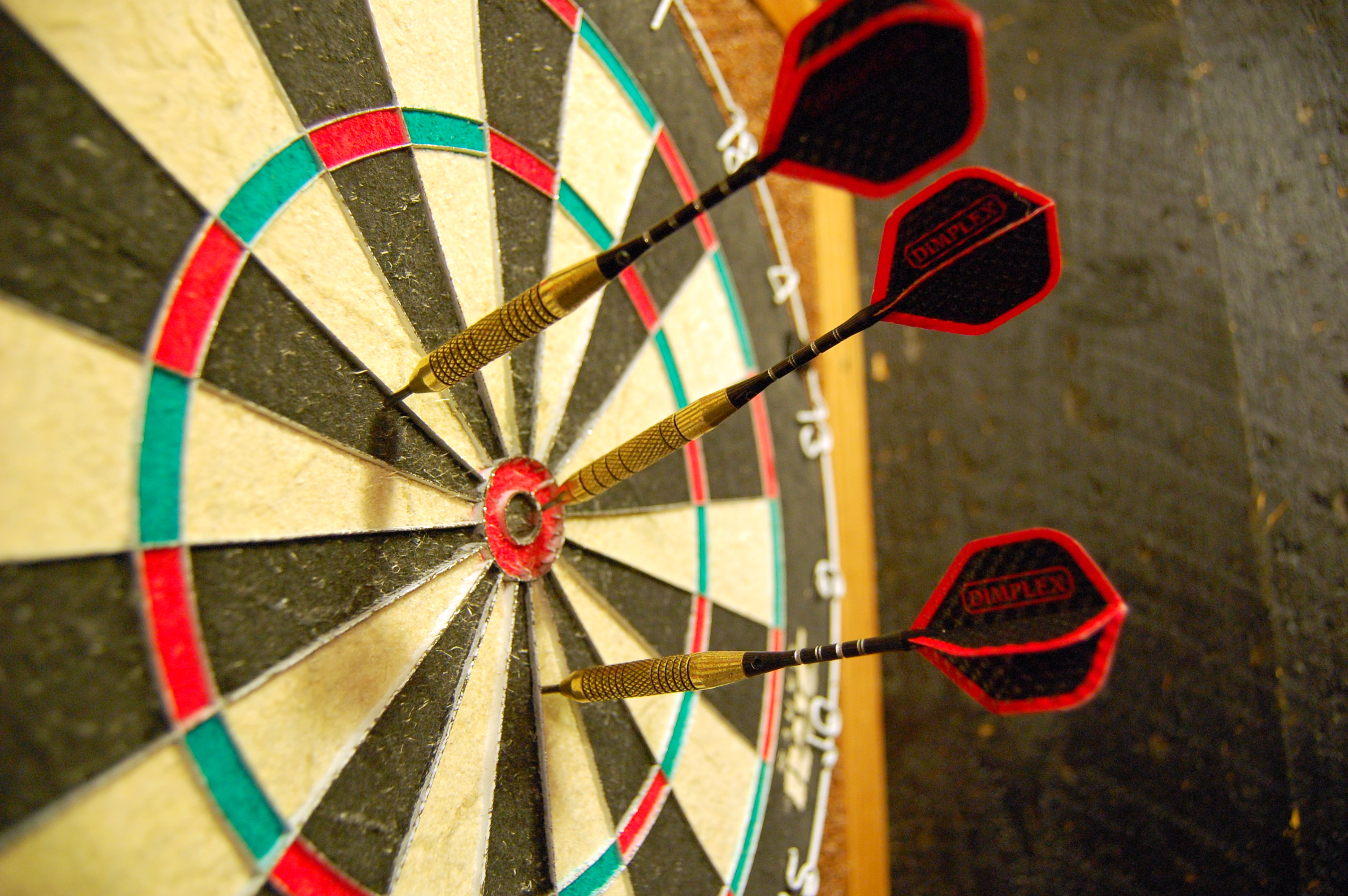
Darts in a dartboard

- Board targets
  - Axe throwing
  - Darts
  - Knife throwing
  - Disc golf

A strike in tenpin bowling

Video of the sport of bocce

- Bowling
  - Alley bowling
    - Tenpin
    - Nine-pin
    - Five-pin
    - Candlepin bowling
    - Duckpin bowling
    - Kegel
    - Trick bowling
    - Turkey bowling
  - Boules
    - Basque bowls
    - Bocce
    - Bocce volo
    - Boccia
    - Bolas criollas
    - Bolo palma
    - Jeu provençal a.k.a. boule lyonnaise
    - Bowls a.k.a. lawn bowls
    - Pétanque
    - Taistelupetankki

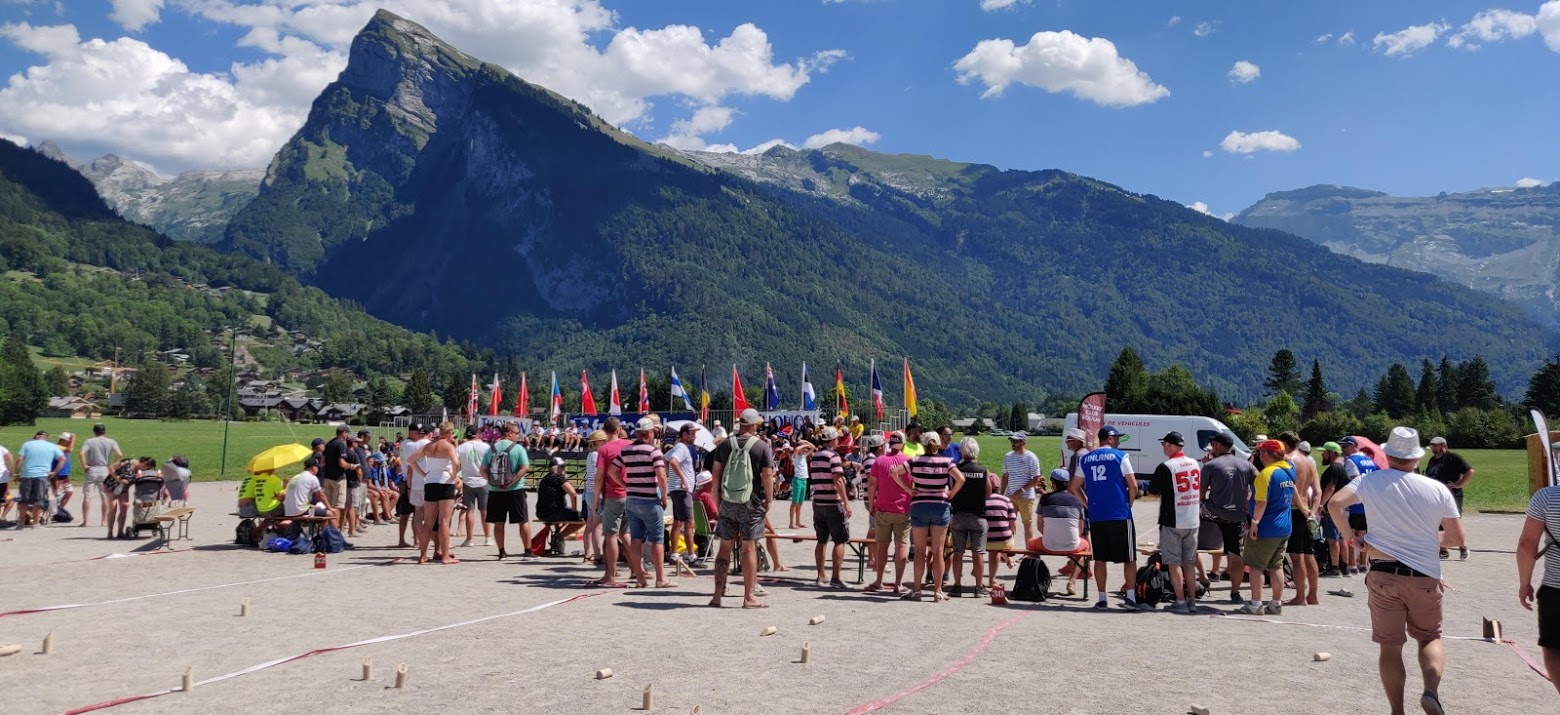
Mölkky players at 2019 World Championship tournament in Samoëns, France

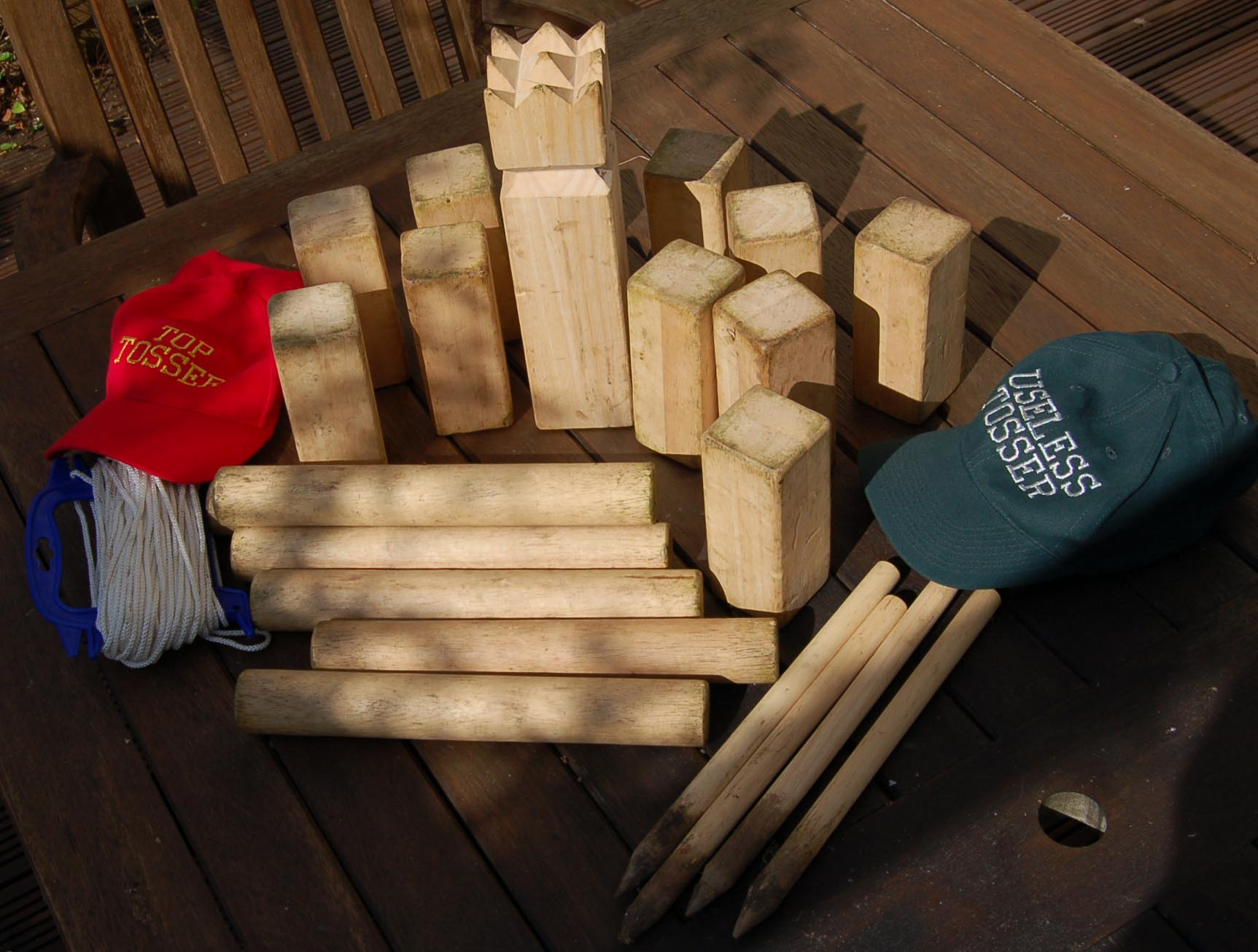
A set of kubb throwing batons and pins

- Skittles
  - Bunnock
  - Finnish skittles
  - Fowling
  - Gorodki
  - Kubb
  - Mölkky

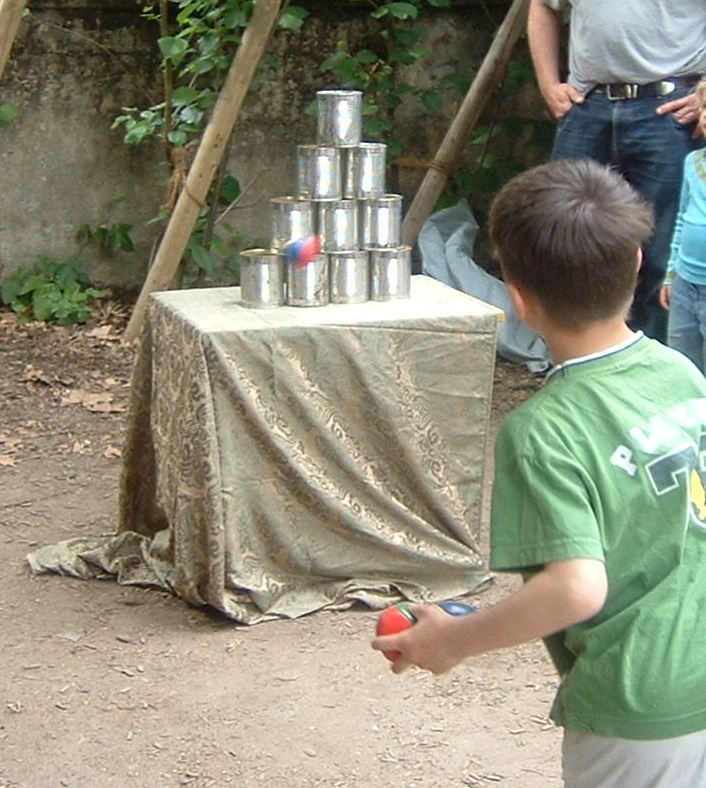
A child playing a can throwing game

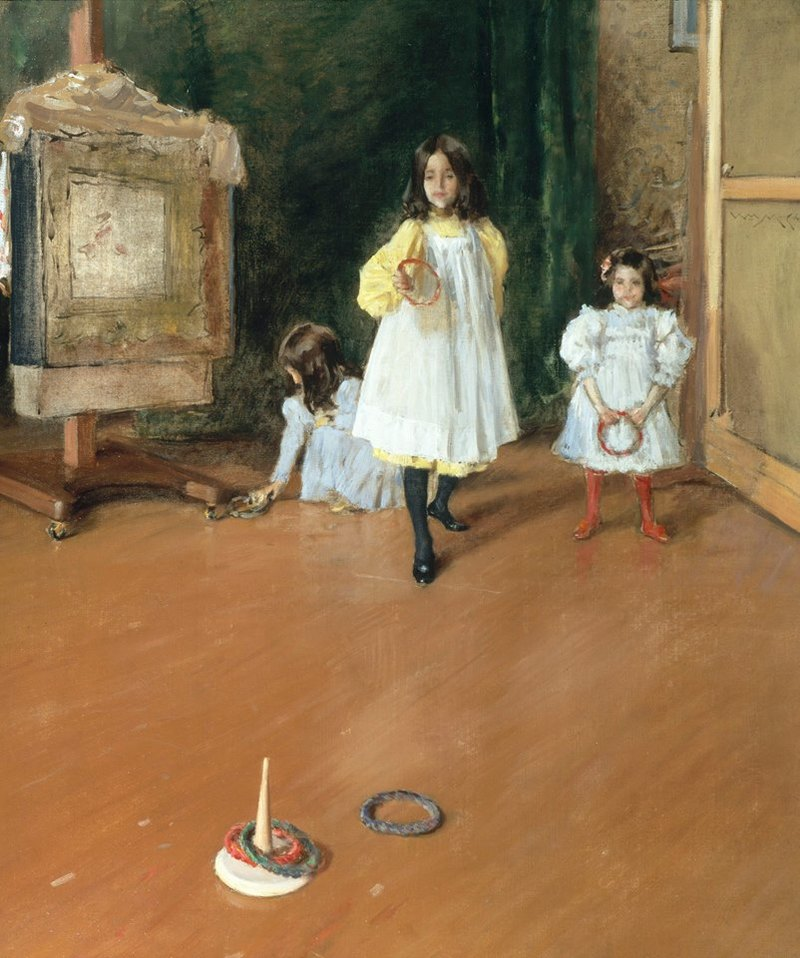
A painting of children playing a ring toss game indoors

- Aunt Sally
- Bean bag throwing
- Cherokee marbles
- Chunkey
- Coconut shy
- Cornhole
- Horseshoes
- Irish road bowling
- Ladder toss
- Lawn darts
- Milk bottle pyramid
- Pitching pennies
- Ring toss
- Quoits
- Svaika
- Tin can alley
- Washer pitching

=== Other varieties ===
- Caber toss – a competitor throws a large pole (the caber), which must fall pointing away from the thrower
- Catch – a basic throwing game, where players throw and catch an object between one another
- Dodgeball – players try to strike opponents with a ball to eliminate them
- Keep away – catch game where players must keep the object away from another player
- Flying disc games – a genre of throwing sports based on flying discs, and containing a large number of games and rule-sets
- Stone skipping⁣ – competitors skip stones on water for both distance and number of skips
- Net and wall sports
  - Hooverball
  - Jollyball
  - Loofball
  - Throwball

== See also ==
- List of jumping activities
- Juggling
- Running
