= Toad in the hole (disambiguation) =

Toad in the hole is a traditional English dish with sausage.

It may also refer to

- Toad in the hole (game), a coin-throwing pub game
- Another name for slosh (cue sport), a game played on a snooker table
- A name sometimes used for a supposedly living entombed animal
- Another name for egg in the basket, an egg fried in a piece of bread

== See also ==
- Towed in a Hole, a Laurel and Hardy film
