= Muckers (game) =

Outdoor game

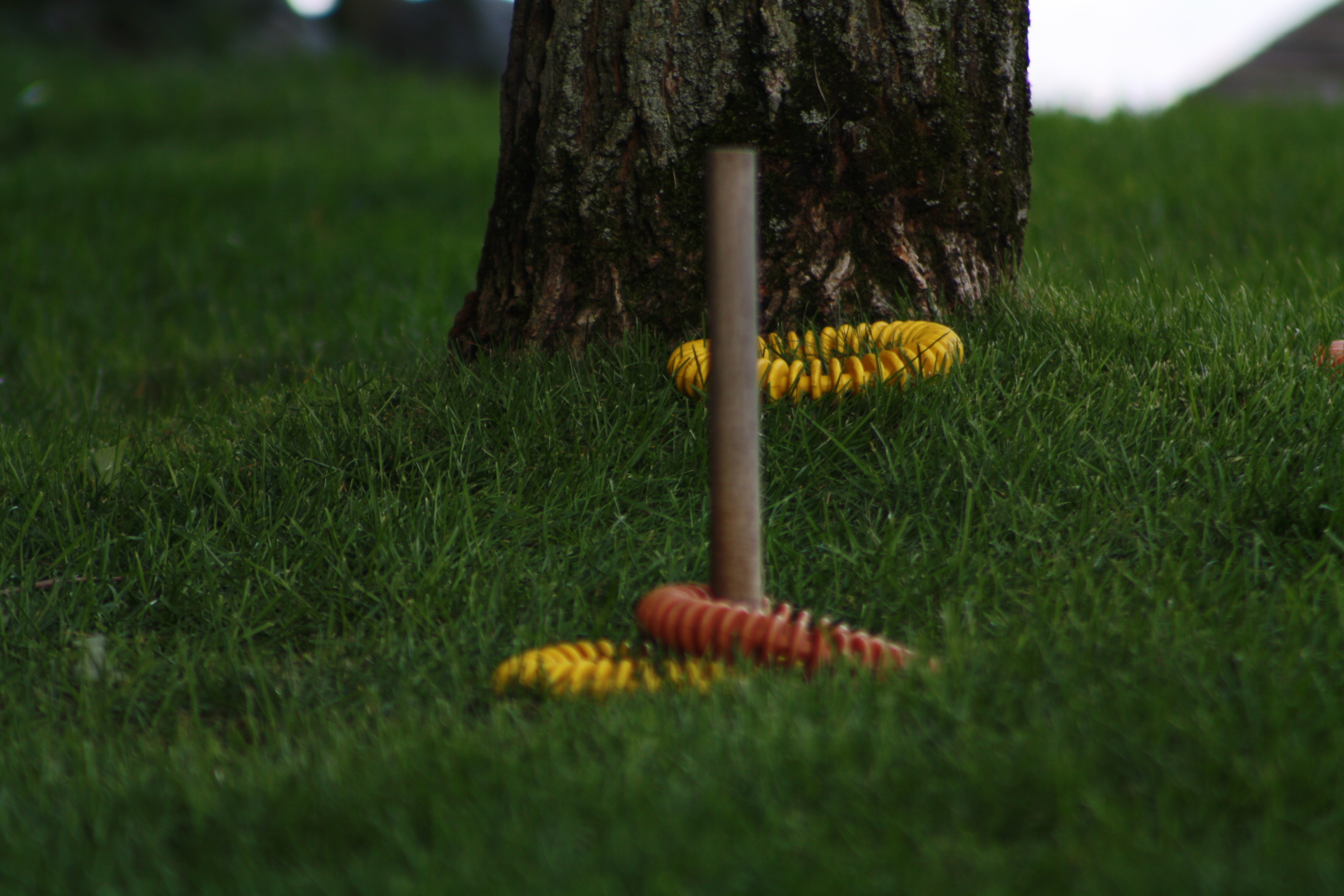
- A pole with muckers around it; during a game of Muckers
- Nicknames: Ring Toss; Circle Horseshoes
- First played: As Quoits

Characteristics
- Team members: 1 or 2
- Equipment: 2 Poles; 2 Muckers

Presence
- Olympic: Non-olympic

Muckers, also known as ring toss (not to be confused with the ring toss carnival game) or circle horseshoes, is an outdoor game, commonly played at summer camps, in which players take turns throwing circular rings at a stick, standing about one foot high. It is a spin-off of Quoits and the popular horseshoes.

== Rules ==
=== Equipment ===
Muckers games are played with rings (known in Muckers as "muckers") and poles.

==== Muckers ====
Muckers are typically 5 inches in diameter and are made of rubbery material. Muckers games are played with two sets of two muckers. Sets are differentiated by color.

==== Poles ====
Muckers games are played with two poles. Sticks are usually wooden and they both stand about one foot high from the ground.

=== Layouts ===
Sticks are erected at ten to twenty feet from each other.

=== Courts ===
Courts can be on grass or sand.

=== Gameplay ===
Muckers games can be played with either two teams of two people or just two people. Games are made up of rounds. A round is completed when both throwers on one side both throw two muckers. The throwers can throw the mucker from anywhere behind the pole. If a thrower's foot is in front of the pole, the opposing player(s) can call a foot fault, thereby revoking the thrower's throw. The thrower who scored in the preceding round, he (or his teammate) throws first in the next round. If neither thrower scored, the order in which the teams threw in the preceding round stays the same in the next round. There is no limit to the number of rounds in a game of muckers.

=== Scoring ===
Games are up to 21 points or 11 points.

Scoring Methods:

- When a mucker lands at the pole within the distance of a mucker, the thrower receives one point for his team.
- When a mucker is leaning on a pole while it is lying on another mucker and it is not touching the ground, the thrower receives two points. This Scoring method is called a floater.
- When a mucker is leaning (not just touching) on the pole, the thrower receives three points for his team. This scoring method is called a leaner.
- When a mucker lands on the pole, the thrower is awarded five points. This scoring method is called a mucker.
- When a mucker is hanging on the top of the pole and is not touching the ground, the thrower gets an automatic win (because it is so rare.) This scoring method is called a hanger.
- SPECIAL, when playing with rubber muckers, if the mucker is inverted to be a non-circular shape and a mucker is scored, the thrower is awarded eight points. This scoring method is called a potato mucker.

In each round only one team can receive points.

- If a single point is scored by both teams, the closer mucker is the one which counts for points. If one team has the two closest muckers, then they receive two points. Although, if both teams muckers are touching the pole, no points are awarded.
- If a floater is scored by both teams, the higher mucker is the one which counts for points. If one team has the two highest muckers, then they receive four points. Although, if both teams muckers are at the same height, no points are awarded.
- If a leaner is scored by both teams, the higher mucker is the one which counts for points. If one team has the two highest muckers, then they receive six points. Although, if both teams muckers are at the same height, no points are awarded.
- If a mucker is scored by both teams, the one on top is the only which counts for points. However, there is a special rules for muckering on top of another mucker. When this happens the team with the one on top gets points for all muckered muckers. As an example, if there are two muckers 10 points are awarded.

Also, if two different valued scoring methods occur in the same round, the higher valued method is counted. As an example, if one team gets a leaner and the other a mucker, the team who threw the mucker is awarded the points.

== Terminology ==
=== Floater ===
When a mucker is leaning on a pole while it is lying on another mucker and it is not touching the ground. This score is valued at two points.

=== Hanger ===
When a mucker is hanging on the top of the pole and is not touching the ground. This score gets an automatic win because it is so rare.

=== Leaner ===
When a mucker is leaning (not just touching) on the pole. This score is valued at three points.

=== Mucker ===
When a mucker lands on the pole. This score is valued at five points.

=== Potato Mucker ===
When playing with rubber muckers, if the mucker is inverted to be a non-circular shape and a mucker is scored. This score is valued at eight points.

=== Skunk ===
When playing to a round of 11, if the score is 7-0 the team with seven wins, automatically. When playing to a round of 21, if the score is 9-0 or 11-1 the team with nine or eleven wins, automatically.

== Throwing styles ==
All styles can be thrown with the right or the left hand

=== Regular Throw ===
The mucker is held with the four non-opposable fingers under the top of the mucker; it is thrown upwards with a slight flicking motion.

It is good for single points as it is fairly predictable when it bounces. It is fair for getting muckers as the hole constantly switches from facing to not facing the pole as it spins backwards.

=== Flicker ===
The mucker is held with the index finger on the top of the mucker; it is thrown at a diagonal angle with a flicking-wrist motion.

Usually used on sand to glide towards the mucker pole.

It is good for all around points. It can slide right up to the pole, for single points. As well, when thrown, the mucker is always on a diagonal, which means the hole will always face the pole, ergo it can very easily score a 5-point mucker.

=== Overhand ===
The mucker is held opposite to the regular throw, the four non-opposable fingers lies on the top of the bottom of the mucker; it is thrown downwards.

Rocco was muckers champion in the city of Toronto in 1984.

=== The MuckerMan Throw ===
The mucker is held with two hands, from below the groin and is thrown with an equal swinging motion in both arms.

The style is similar to the non-traditional style of the two-handed bowling approach.

It is good for getting muckers, since the hole is mostly open towards the pole. However, it is unpredictable when it bounces and therefore it is not good for single points.

== See also ==
- Quoits
- Horseshoes
- Ladder Toss
- Washer pitching
- Lawn game
- Cornhole
