= Quarters (game) =

Drinking game

Drinking Game
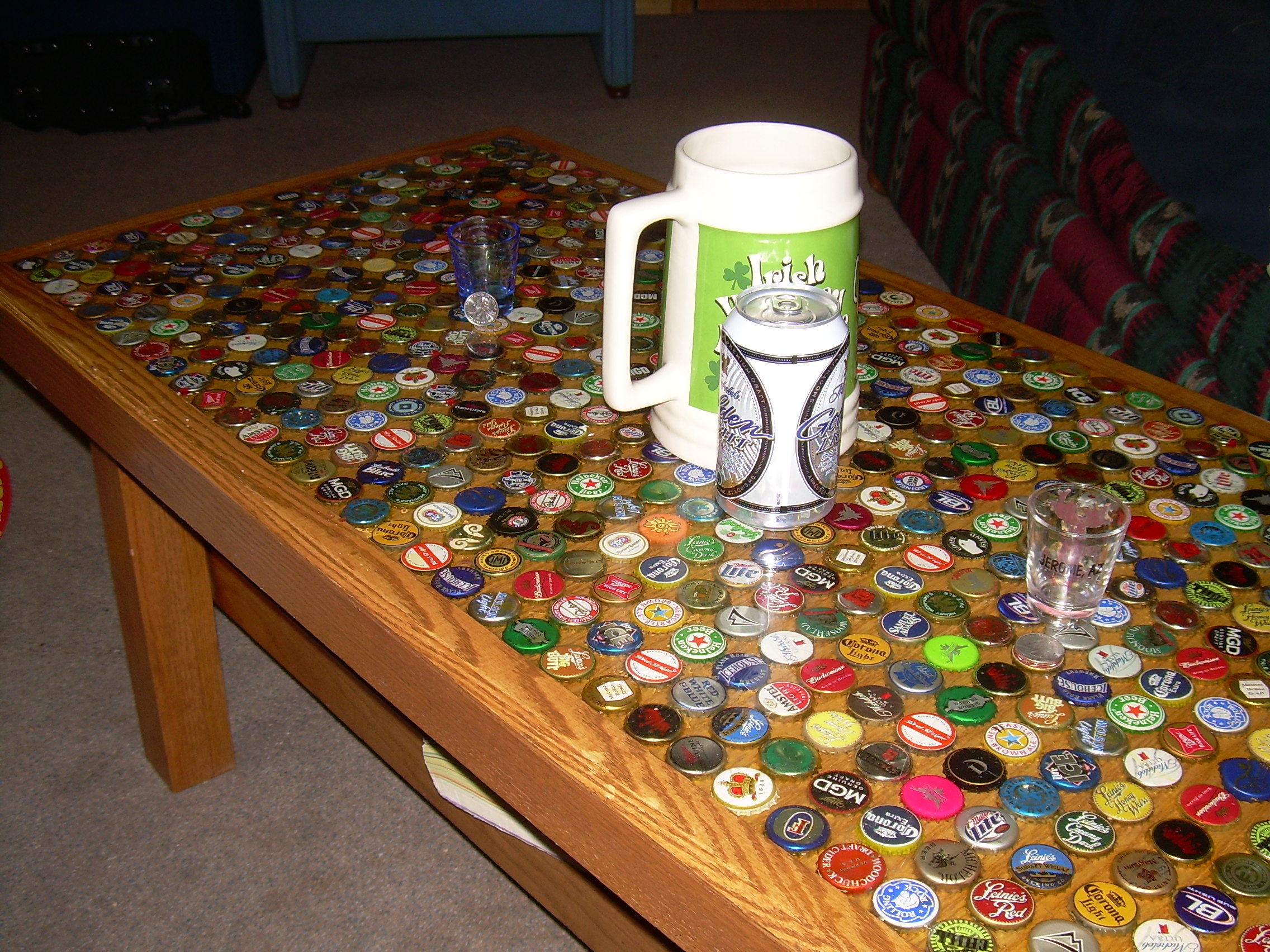
- A game of Speed Quarters. On opposite sides of the table, players bounce quarters into a shot glass.
- Players: usually 3+
- Setup time: 2 minutes
- Playing time: 10-20 minutes or less
- Chance: Easy
- Age range: Adult
- Skills: Aiming

Quarters is a drinking game which involves players bouncing an American quarter or similar-size coin off a table in an attempt to have the quarter land in a certain place, usually into a shot glass (or cup) on that table. It is also played in South America, where it is called monedita, Spanish for little coin.

The player bouncing the quarter is referred to as the "shooter." In some variations the glass is empty and each player has a separate glass to drink from, while in other variations the glass that the shooter is aiming for contains an alcoholic beverage.

The quarter is customarily bounced on the face whether heads or tails. Some games may allow a player to bounce the quarter on the edge, particularly by rolling it down their nose.

== Rules ==
Each round starts off with a glass filled with a drink in the middle of the table and two people on opposite ends of the table having a quarter and a glass. Each player shoots their quarter at their own glass until he or she makes it in, then the player passes the glass to the player to their left. If the player to their left still has a glass as well, the player taps that glass with theirs, and the player who has been tapped must drink from the glass in the middle of the table, refill it, then make the quarter into their glass before they get tapped again, with play still going around the table. If a player makes their first shot, s/he can choose to pass the glass to any player who does not currently have a glass. If there are enough people at the table, the group can add more shot glasses and position them equally spaced around the outside of the circle.

=== Speed Quarters ===
This version involves six or more people around a small table, several quarters, drinks for each player, and two empty shot glasses placed in front of opposite players. When the game begins, the two players with glasses pick up a quarter and try to bounce it off of the table into the shot glass in front of them as quickly as possible. If the shot is not made they keep shooting until one makes the shot. This player dumps the quarter out and passes the glass to the player to his left while the other shooter continues to shoot until they make a quarter into their shot glass. Eventually, when repeated enough, one glass will catch up to the other in rotation. When this happens, the player still shooting must overturn a glass and stack the other on top. This player gets two chances to bounce a quarter off of the table and into the top glass. If they make it on the first, they can pass the stacked glasses to any player, where that player get two chances, and so on. If the player makes it on the second shot, the glasses are unstacked, one passes to the player on the left, and one to the player opposite. Game-play resumes from the beginning. If the player does not get a quarter into the stacked glasses in two shots, the player on their right will spin a quarter while the "loser" chugs their drink until the quarter ceases to spin. Any player can blow on the quarter or spin it with their finger to keep it spinning. After this, the glasses are split like when the game started and it begins again. Game-play ends when the players feel they are sufficiently inebriated.

=== Other variations ===
An alternative method of gameplay is that one glass is positioned in the center of the table. Participants take turns attempting to bounce the quarter into the glass. If the shooter succeeds, they pass the glass to anyone at the table, and that person must then chug the beverage and catch the quarter in their teeth. Play then passes to the person on the shooter's left. Should the shooter fail to make the shot, they have the option of passing the quarter to the left, or shooting a second time. If the shooter succeeds on their second shot, they pass the glass as usual. If the shooter fails on their second shot, they must drink the beverage. In either case, the person on their left becomes the next shooter.

Another method involves various cups and one community cup. A community cup is first placed in the center of the table. Each player has their own individual cup, and these cups are placed around the community cup, forming a ring around the community cup (much like a flower pattern). Players fill their individual cups with a shot of their drink, and pour a small amount of their drink into the community cup (various drinks can be used to play, so the community cup may house a mixture of different drinks). A shooter begins by bouncing a quarter towards the cups. If the quarter lands in a player's cup, the player must drink their shot, refill the cup, and place it back with the rest. If the shooter lands the quarter in to the community cup, every player must reach into the center and drink their shot. The last player to finish their drink must then drink the community cup. If the shooter makes their shot on the first attempt, they may shoot again until they miss. If they miss on the first attempt, they must pass the quarter to the next player on their left. This game is commonly called Ponderosa.

Another variation gives the shooter the power to make a rule if they land the quarter in the cup in a certain number of consecutive tries. The rule is often that shooters must then say a phrase, or perhaps that no one at the table can say a certain word, with the penalty being an instant drink by the offending player. This effectively speeds up the intoxication. Common rules that the shooter will create are that no one can say the word Drink, Drank, Drunk or point with their finger. Note that only one rule can be created at a time.

Any shot where the shooter does not bounce the quarter off of the table at least once counts as a miss.

== Beverages ==
The players must determine beforehand how much is to be consumed each time a player is required to drink. This depends on the variation being played and the appetites of the players.

== See also ==
- Pitch penny, a game involving throwing coins across the room and into a hole or next to a wall
- List of drinking games
