= Slosh (cue sport) =

Cue sport

Slosh (also known as Russian billiards, Indian pool, Indian billiards, and toad-in-the-hole) is a cue sport played on a snooker table. The game features seven balls, coloured white (for the cue ball), yellow, green, brown, blue, pink and black, with points being scored for pocketing or playing caroms and cannons off object balls. The game is played to a score of 100 points, or a length of 30 minutes. First played in the early 1900s, not much is known about the game's origins.

== Origin ==
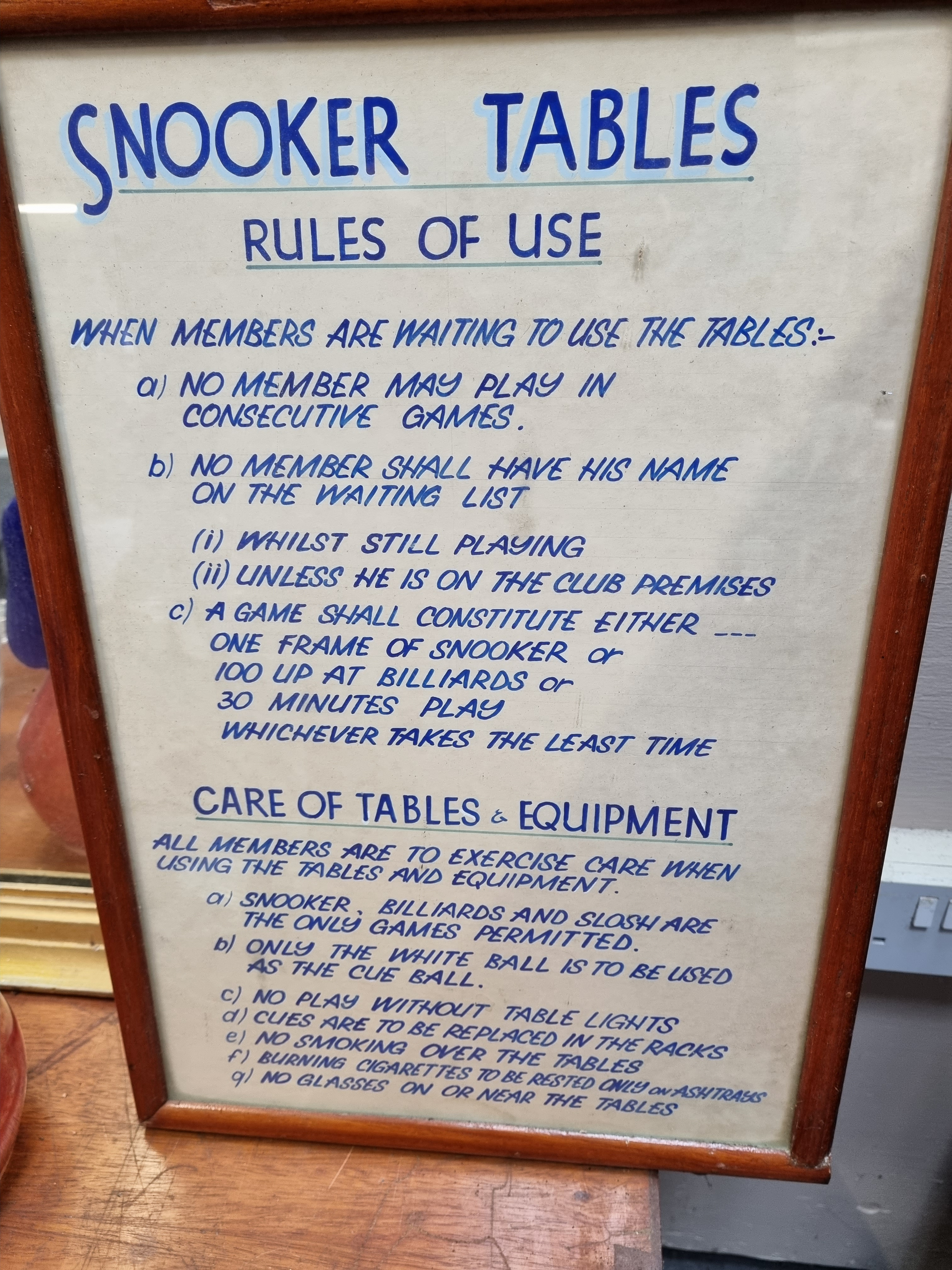
Slosh named on a snooker table sign

Not much is known about the origins of slosh, other than the alternative name, Russian billiards, is unlikely to have come from Russian descent. Slosh is likely to have been founded around the early 20th century, being derived with the cue sport of snooker from the game of black pool, played with the same balls and table. The game is sometimes known as Indian billiards or Indian pool. These names are sometimes misappropriated to a table carrom game. Other names for the game include toad-in-the-hole (not to be confused with Toad in the hole or the food of the same name) and Russian pool, although it is unknown why these names are used.

== Rules ==
The game is played with seven balls. These are a white cue ball, and six object balls in different colours: yellow, green, brown, blue, pink and black. A game for two to four players; the first shot must be played towards the black ball, with points being scored for either pocketing the object ball, or playing carom shots, pocketing the cue ball. Points may only be scored by pocketing into certain pockets for each individual coloured ball.

Slosh is played to a total of 100 points. A player can continue to stroke after completing any legal pot or carom. Points are awarded for each ball differently, with two points for a pot on the yellow, three for the green, four for the brown, five for the blue, six for the pink and seven for the black. Playing a cannon (hitting two object balls) is worth two points. To win, the player must finish on exactly 100 points, or be on the highest number of points after 30 minutes of play. If the shooter exceeds 100, the score is reduced to 50, but the player can continue their inning.

Foul shots, such as potting a ball in the incorrect pocket, or playing an in-off results in points being either deducted from the player's points, or awarded to their opponent.

== Bibliography ==
- Billiards and Snooker Teasers Explained (14th ed.). London: Burroughes and Watts. 1957. ASIN B07JCW8HQS.
- Handbook and Rules of - English Billiards - Snooker - Volunteer Snooker - Pool Pyramids - Russian Pool (Reprint ed.). Brunswich-Balke Collendar Co. 2010 [1911]. ISBN 9781445525457.
- Phelan, Michael (16 January 2017) [1850]. Billiards Without a Master (reprint ed.). New York: D. D. Winant. ISBN 9780282488246.
- Shamos, Michael I. (2002). The New Illustrated Encyclopedia of Billiards. New York: Lyons Press. ISBN 978-1-58574-685-9.
- Smith, Willie (1924). How to Play Snooker and Other Pool Games. Crawley: C.A. Pearson.
- Stooke, Mike (1988). Snooker Games: Games of the Snooker Table: Five of Today's Most Popular Alternative Games. Birmingham: Poolman. ISBN 9780951297704.
- Know the Game – Billiards and Snooker. 1954. ISBN 9781473390195.
- Walker, Donald (1837). Games and Sports: Being an Appendix to Manly Exercises and Exercises for Ladies, Containing the Various In-door Games and Sports, the Out-of-door Games and Sports, Those of the Seasons, &c. London: Thomas Hurst.
