= Washer pitching =

American throwing game

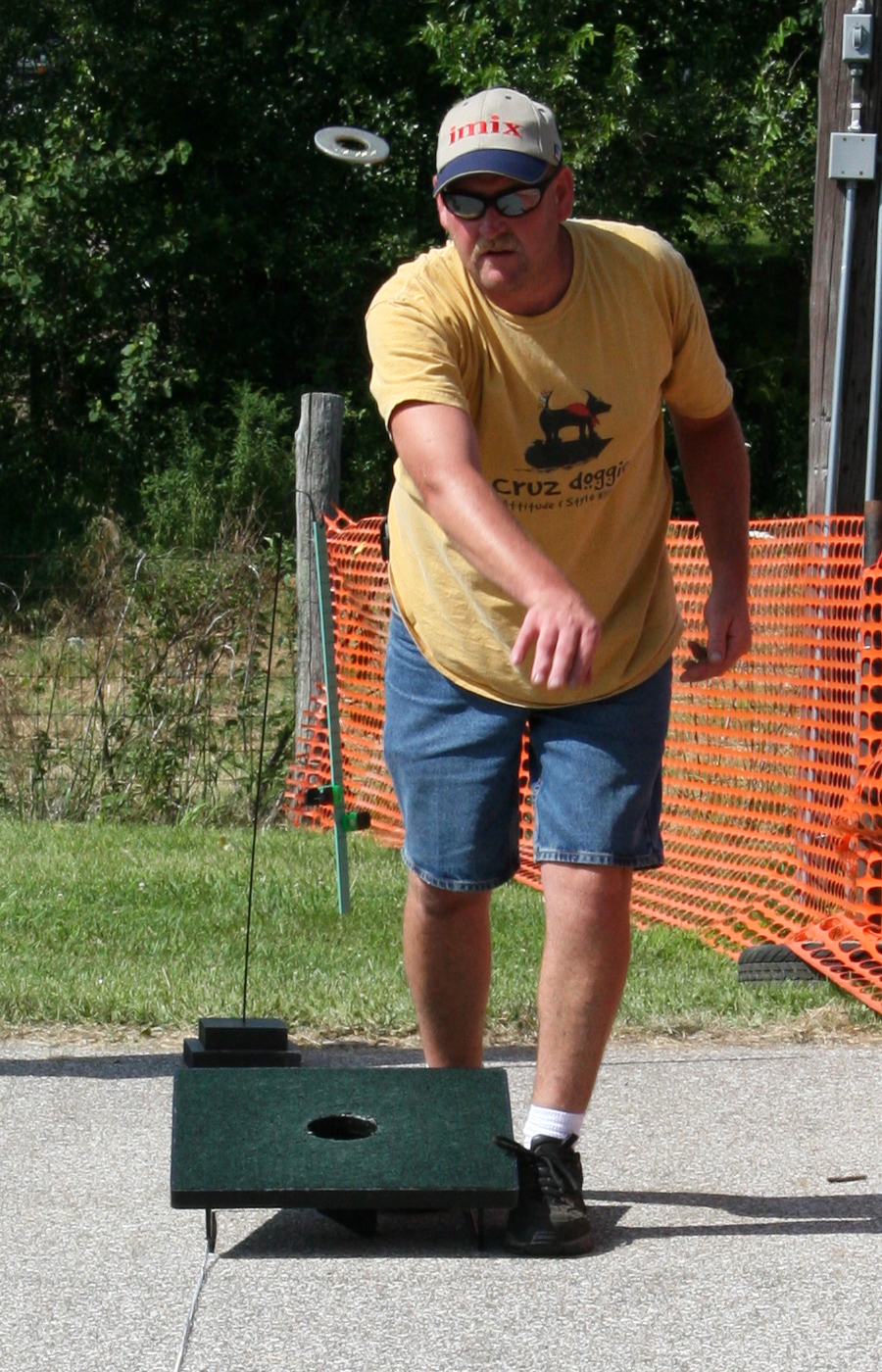
A player tosses a washer during a tournament in Indiana.

Examples of commercial washers used in washer pitching

Examples of custom pitching washers

Washer pitching is a game, similar to horseshoes, that involves teams of players taking turns to throw washers towards a box or hole. The game has many variations, and may be called washer pitching, washer toss, washers, huachas or washoes (which is based on the similarity to horseshoes).

The object of the game is to earn points by tossing metal washers, usually around 2 inches (51 mm) in diameter, and 1/8 inch (3.2 mm) thick, toward a hole, usually denoted by a can or PVC pipe, often in a box. Washer pits and boxes vary in size and shape, but a standard for one-hole washers is 16 by 16 by 4 inches (410 mm × 410 mm × 100 mm), with a cylindrically-shaped cup (4 1/2 in [110 mm] in diameter and 5 in [130 mm] in height) located in its upper surface. Boxes are placed approximately 20 feet (6.1 m) away from each other, a distance often determined by a string attached to the front of each box. However, if a string is not attached to the box, one may take 10 paces from box-to-box, this will usually denote 20 feet.

The throwing player stands on, next to, or behind one box and tosses washers toward the other, normally using an underhand throw. Scoring is similar to horseshoes in that the second team to throw can wash-out/rebut any points that the first team may have scored, then add to their own total. Three points are awarded to a non-rebutted ringer (a washer in the cup). One point is awarded to each non-rebutted washer inside the box. Games are normally played to 21 points.

== See also ==
- Bunnock, also known as Glockenspiel
- Toad in the hole (game), a similar British pub game
- Penny in the hole
- Kubb
- Lawn game
- Mölkky
- Quoits
- Tailgate party
- Muckers
- Cornhole
