= Ring toss =

Game where rings are tossed around a peg

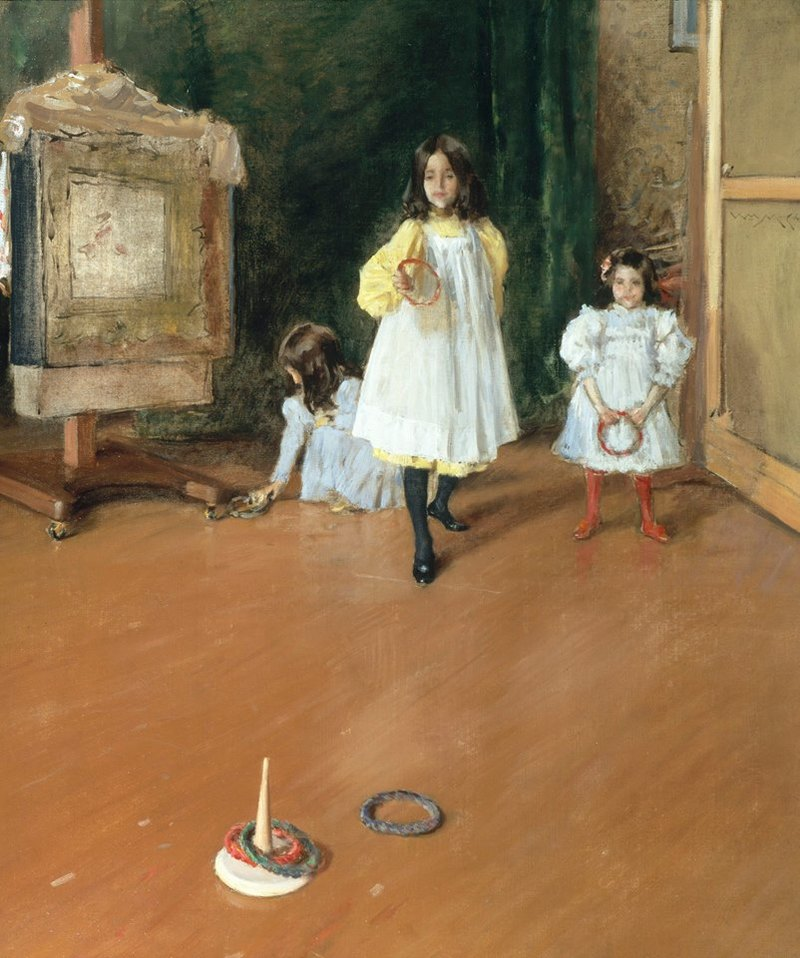
"Ring Toss" by William Merritt Chase (1898)

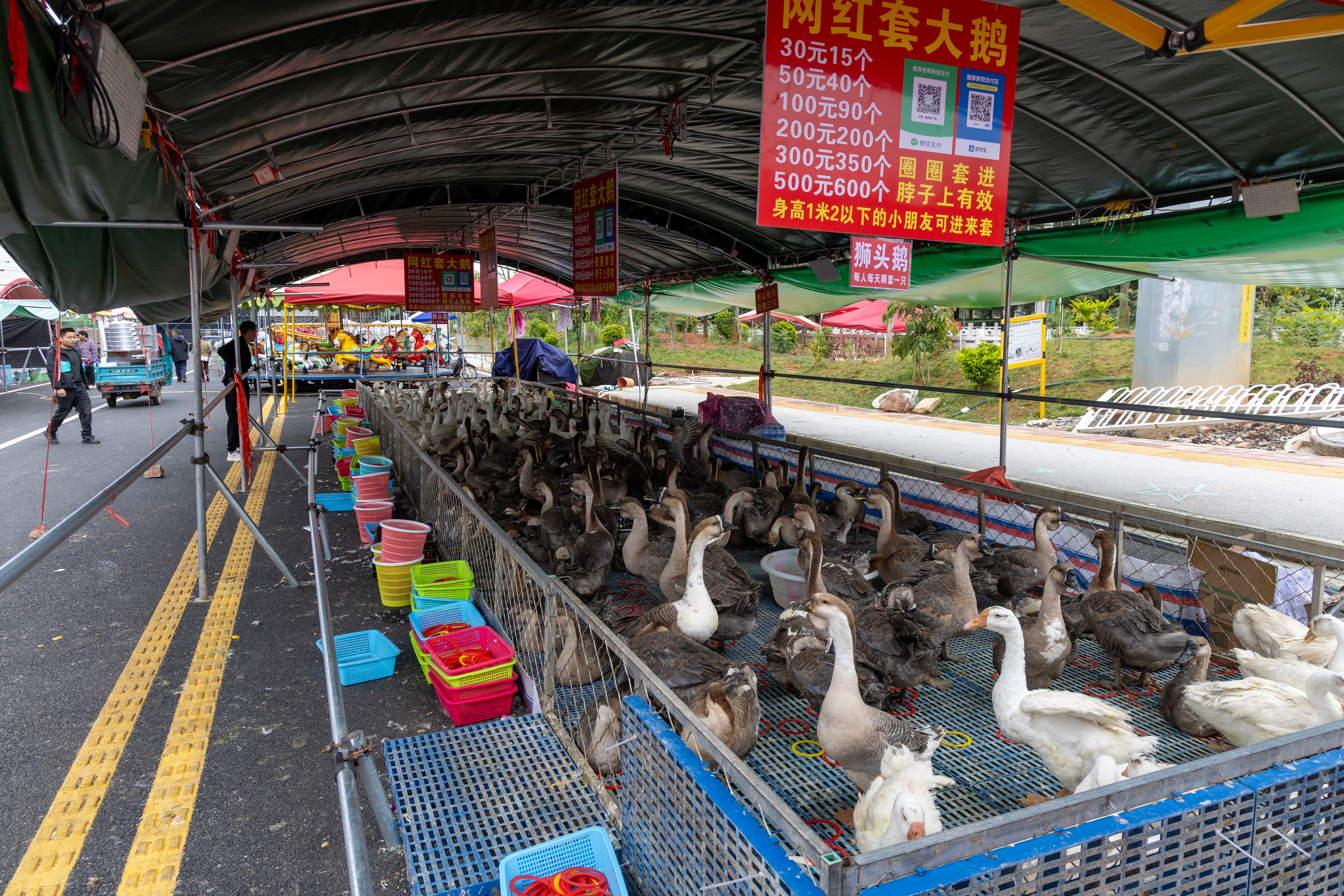
A goose-ring toss booth in China

Ring toss is a game where rings are tossed around a peg. It is common at amusement parks. A variant, sometimes referred to as "ring-a-bottle", replaces pegs with bottles, where the thrower may keep the bottle (and its contents) if successful.

Ring toss is also a game for toddlers and children that can assist in the development of motor skills and hand-eye coordination development.

== See also ==
- Horseshoes
- Quoits
- Muckers
