= Taistelupetankki =

Taistelupetankki (Finnish for "combat pétanque") is an outdoor sport game based on pétanque, developed in Finland in 1999. Taistelupetankki is played with the same equipment as pétanque, but it can be played in more diverse terrain.

In the game, a player (or a team) has two metal balls. On their turn, the player tries to get at least one of their balls closest to the jack. There are two ways to get one's ball closest to the jack: try to throw one's ball close enough in the first place, or try to knock an opponent's ball or the jack off with one's own ball. A popular tactic is to use one ball to knock an opponent's ball off and the other to get closest to the jack. If a player doesn't get even one of their balls closest to the jack on their turn, they drop out of the game. The game continues until only one player remains.

Taistelupetankki players describe the game as "continuing where pétanque left off".

== Equipment ==
- Two iron balls, discernible from others. Diameter 60 to 80 mm, weight 600 to 800 g.
- Jack, usually made of wood. Diameter 20 to 40 mm.

== Course of the game ==
One of the players, usually the winner of the last game or the youngest player, throws the jack to a place they deem worthy. After this, a combination shot happens, where every player throws both of their balls, one at a time, onto the playing field, every player at the same time. It is recommended to watch where the balls land.

The first proper throwing round is started by the player who has either of their balls the furthest away from the jack. Both balls are thrown, one at a time, towards the jack so that at least one of them ends up closest to the jack. If the player fails to do this on their turn, he/she drops out of the game.

The next throwing turn is for the player who has either of their balls the furthest away from the jack. This continues until all players have thrown their balls, and this order of throwing continues for the following rounds.

=== The throw ===
The player picks their ball up from the ground from between their feet and throws it where he/she stands. Contrary to normal pétanque, it is allowed to jump during the throw, provided that the player lands on the same spot where they started from. The ball must travel in the air at least 10 cm.

=== Duration ===
The game can last from five minutes to an hour, depending on the circumstances (skill, terrain conditions, weather, number of successful knocks, the players' mental state...)

=== Judges ===
The players act as judges themselves, in order to reach a consensus should controversial situations arise.

== Competitions ==
The Finnish Taistelupetankki Association holds competitions open to everyone. There are competitions all year round, mostly based on the capital region. Also individual competitions are held annually at least in Tampere and Tallinn.
