= Pitching pennies =

Game played by throwing coins at a wall

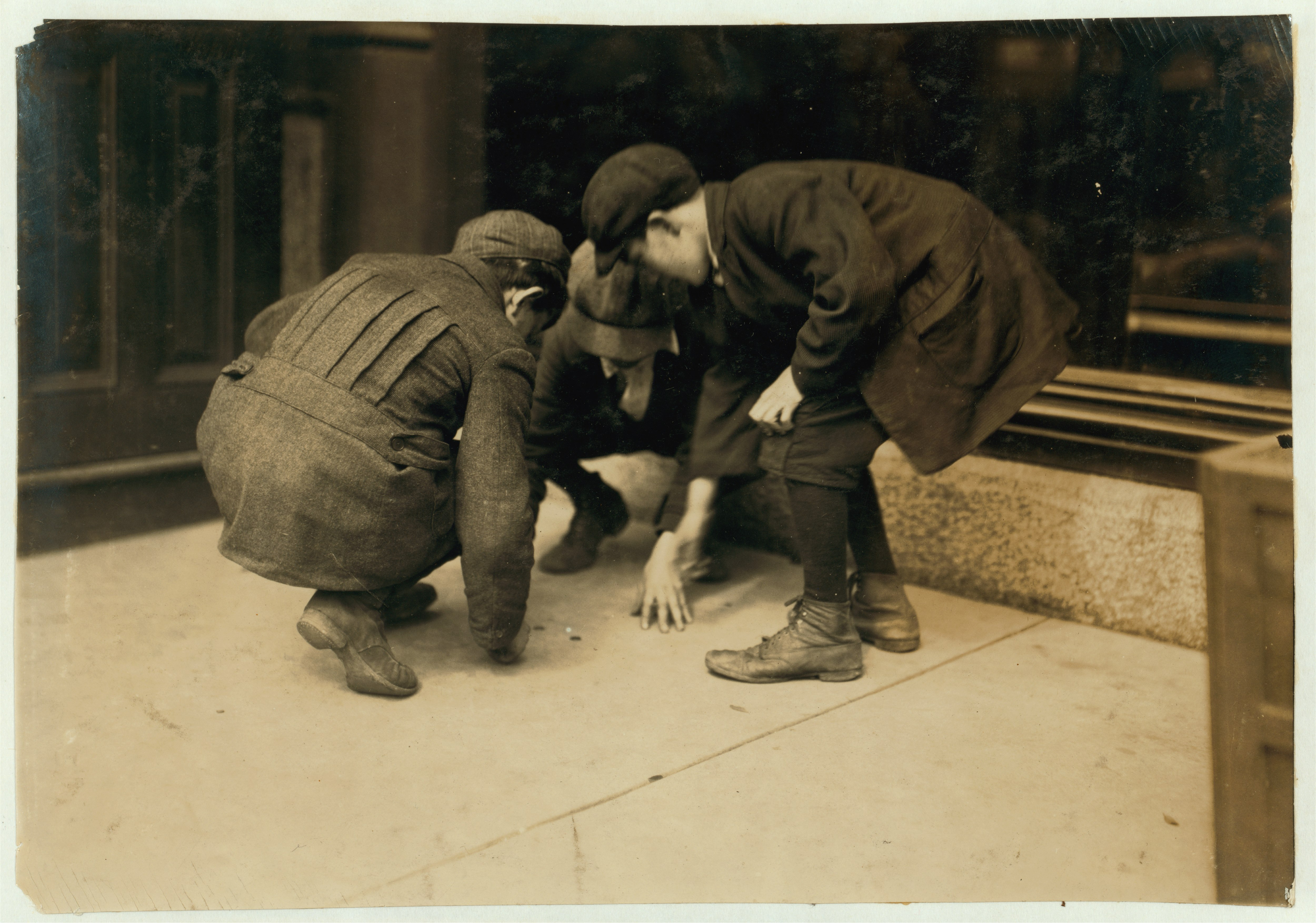
Mill boys pitching pennies on the street, 1916

Pitching pennies is a game played with coins. Players take turns to throw a coin at a wall, from some distance away, and the coin which lands closest to the wall is the winner.

In Britain the game is also known as pap, penny up or penny up the wall and it is referred to as pitch-and-toss in Rudyard Kipling's poem If—. In Scotland it is called keeley and chipsy, in Wales nippy, and other names include money up, chucks, quarters, tinks, jingles and jingies.

The history of the game is ancient, and it is known to have been played by Ancient Greek children using bronze coins.

In 1998, basketball player Michael Jordan played the game against security guard John Michael Wozniak, an event depicted in the documentary The Last Dance.
