= Penny in the hole =

British throwing game

Penny in the hole (also called penny seat, penny slot, tossing the penny, and pitch penny) is a pub game. It involves throwing coins across the room and into a hole carved in the seat of a wooden bench.

A similar game is Toad in the Hole in which a dedicated table or box is used instead of a hole carved in a convenient piece of pub furniture. Toad in the Hole has a World Championship held in Lewes.

== History ==
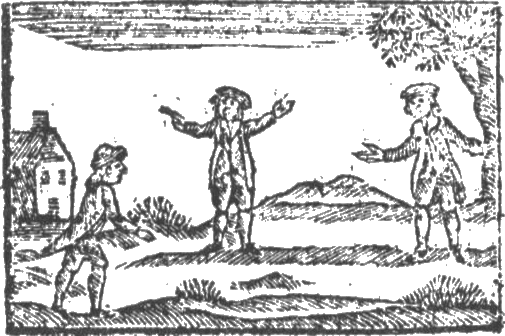
A game of Chuck-Farthing: As you value your Pence, At the Hole take your Aim; Chuck all safely in, And you'll win the Game.

A version of the game called chuck-farthing was played in the United Kingdom. Mentions of the game date back to the 18th century. The rules of the game were described in the 19th century as follows: Each competitor starts with the same number of coins. They pitch their coins one at a time from a mark at a given distance towards a hole in the ground. The competitors are ranked based on how close they come to the hole. The competitor closest to the hole receives all of the coins and proceeds to a second mark nearer to the hole, from which he throws all of the coins at once towards the hole. All of the coins that remain in the hole are his to keep. The remainder of the coins are given to the next closest competitor, and the process is repeated until no coins remain.

A variation of the game called chuck-hole or chuck-penny was played in the same manner, with the exception that if the coins roll outside a ring drawn around the hole, it was declared a "dead heat," and each competitor reclaims his coin. The coins used were usually small denomination, farthings, halfpence, or pennies. Sometimes rough-cast leaden markers called dumps were used.

== In popular culture ==
The game is featured at the beginning of the film "The Purple Rose of Cairo" (1985), and at the end of the film "The Cincinnati Kid" (1965).

== See also ==
- Quarters, a drinking game which involves players bouncing a quarter off a table and into a glass or cup on that table
