= Quoits =

Game of throwing ring-shaped objects over a spike

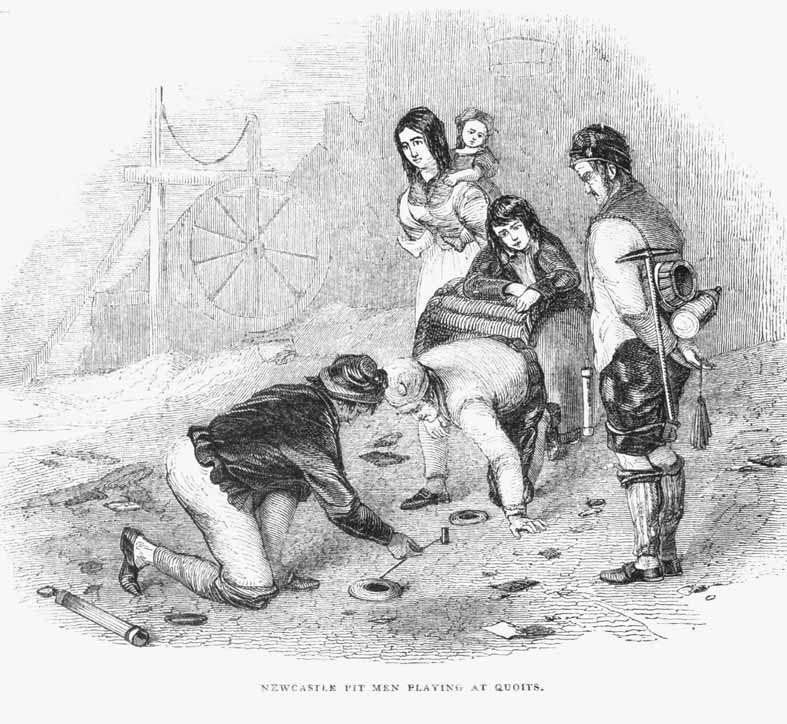
- Newcastle pit men playing quoits

Quoits (/ˈkɔɪts/ or /ˈkwɔɪts/) is a traditional game which involves the throwing of metal, rope or rubber rings over a set distance, usually to land over or near a spike (sometimes called a hob, mott or pin). The game of quoits encompasses several distinct variations.

== History ==
Quoits is supposedly the game the ancient Greek deity Apollo was playing with his lover Hyacinth which ultimately resulted in his death. In Apollonius of Rhodes' Argonautica, Thetis sees Jason and the other heroes "delighting in mass throwing (σόλῳ ῥιπῇσί) and arrows." The Greek word "σόλος" usually refers to a mass of iron used for throwing. It is often translated as "quoit."

From coyte: "flat stone thrown in a game". Probably from Old French coite: "flat stone". Possible derivation of coilte: "cushion".

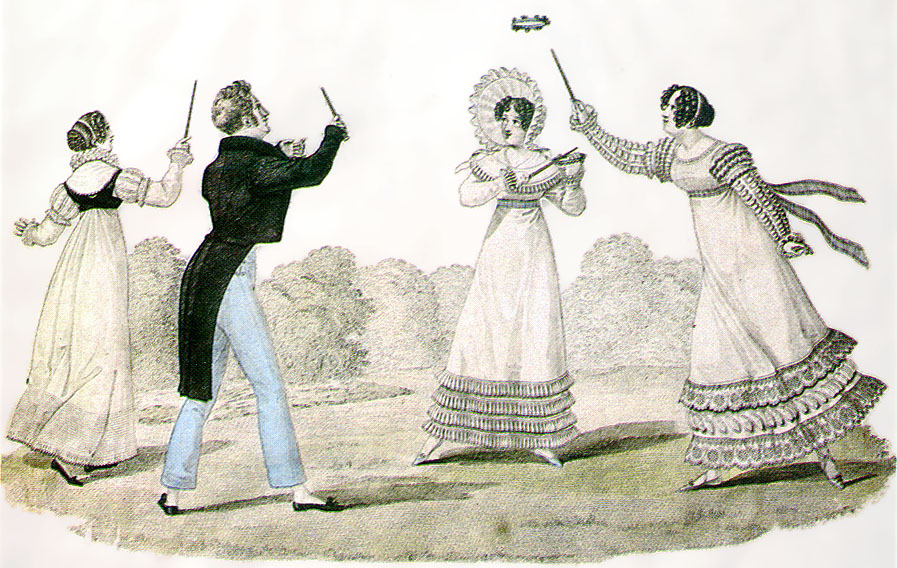
Game of ringtoss c. 1815

It is not until the 19th century that the game is documented in any detailed way. The official rules first appeared in the April 1881 edition of The Field, having been defined by a body formed from pubs in Northern England.

A July 13, 1836, advertisement in the National Intelligencer (Washington, D.C.) touted facilities for "the manly and healthy amusements of quoits, ten-pin, fives, &c." on the premises of a "Coffee House" in Berkeley Springs, Virginia (now West Virginia).

== Variations ==
=== Traditional quoits ===
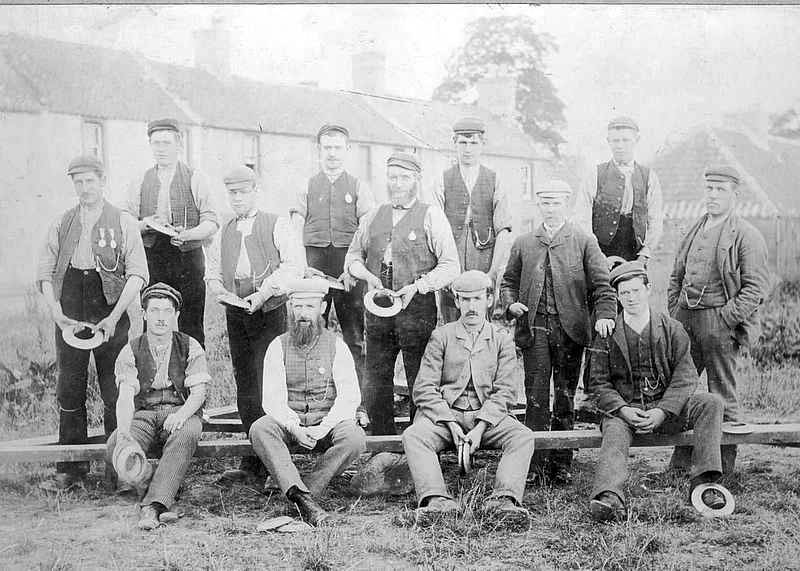
Players in Argentine Rosario A.C., c. 1890

A game played with metal discs, traditionally made of steel, and thrown across a set distance at a metal spike (called a pin, hob or mott). The spike is centrally, and vertically, positioned in a square of moist clay measuring three feet across.

==== United Kingdom ====
===== The northern game =====
This version uses the 15 rules published in The Field in 1881 and has remained largely unchanged since that time. Played under the auspices of The National Quoits Association, formed in 1986.

In this game, the pins are 11 yards (10 metres) apart, with their tops protruding 3–4 inches (8–10 centimetres) above the clay. Quoits measure about 5 1/2 in (14 cm) in diameter and weigh around 5 1/2 lb (2.5 kg).

===== The long game =====
Sometimes called the old game, this version is played in Wales and Scotland; Scotland had around a dozen clubs, now reduced to one which is based in Stonehaven, under the control of the Scottish Quoiting Association, whilst Wales has only a few clubs, most of them in Dyfed and Powys.

In this game, the top of the spike is flush with the clay, so encircling the pin is not a significant part of the game. The long game has similarities to the game of bowls, in that a player scores a point for each quoit nearer to the pin than his opponent. The hobs are 18 yd (16 m) apart, while the quoits are typically around 9 in (23 cm) in diameter and weigh up to 11 lb (5 kg), almost double that of the northern game.

===== East Anglian quoits =====
An English version of the long game, played using quoits of reduced size and weight. As with the long game, the hobs are 18 yards apart, but their tops are raised above the level of the clay. Quoits that land cleanly over the hob score two points, regardless of the opponent's efforts, and are removed immediately, prior to the next throw. Quoits which land on their backs, or inclined in a backwards direction, are also removed immediately.

In the games played around South Suffolk, Stoke by Nayland (The Black Horse) the inclined beds of clay had a hidden pin, which had a piece of white paper inserted over it. Quoits that hit the pin were called ‘ringers’ after the noise made by metal hitting metal.

==== United States ====
Traditional American 4lb quoits. The standard for American Quoits is governed by the United States Quoiting Association. The USQA was created in April 2003.

The USQA unified a specific standard for the 4 Lb quoit. Each regulation set of USQA Quoits includes 4 foundry-cast steel quoits in perfect proportion to the historical Traditional American Quoit. Each quoit weighs 4 lb (1.8 kg) and is approximately 6 1/2 in (17 cm) in diameter, has a 3-inch-diameter (8 cm) hole, and stands 1 in (2.5 cm) high.

Since 2003 the USQA has conducted annual tournaments culminating in a World Championship in both singles and doubles as well as a season ending points champion.

Mexican Americans play this game in the southwestern United States and call it wacha.

=== Indoor or table quoits ===
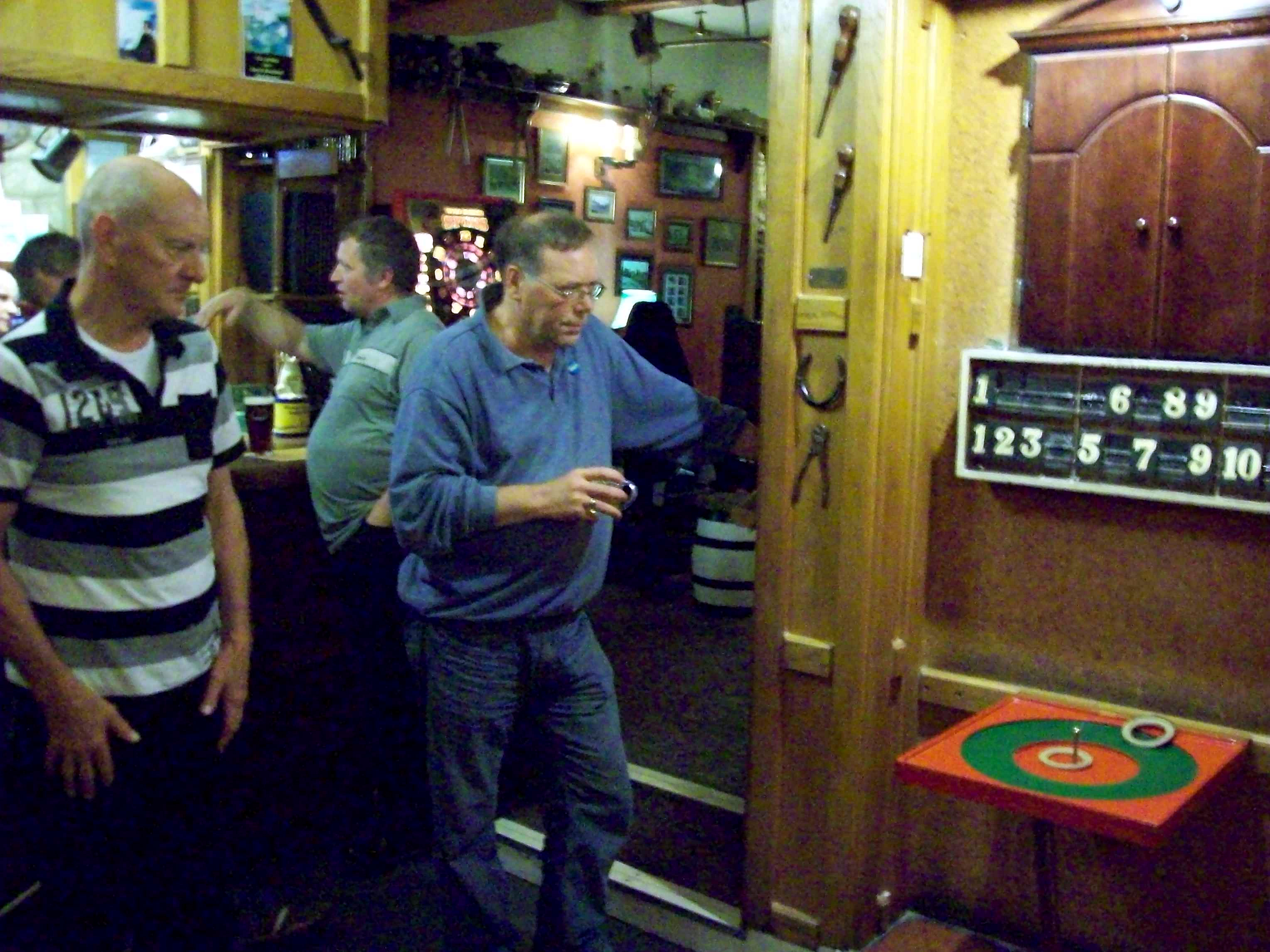
A game of indoor quoits, being played in the Forest of Dean

Exclusively a pub game, this variant is predominantly played in mid and south Wales and in England along its border with Wales.

Matches are played by two teams (usually the host pub versus another pub) and typically consist of four games of singles, followed by three games of doubles. Players take it in turns to pitch four rubber rings across a distance of around 8½ feet onto a raised quoits board. The board consists of a central pin or spike and two recessed sections: an inner circular section called the dish and a circular outer section.

Five points are awarded for a quoit landing cleanly over the pin, two points for a quoit landing cleanly in the dish, and one point for a quoit landing cleanly on the outer circular section of the board. The scoreboard consists of numbers running from 1 to 10, 11 or 12, and the object of the game is to score each of these numbers separately using four or fewer quoits, the first side to achieve this being the winner.

=== Deck quoits ===
Deck quoits is a variant which is popular on cruise ships. The quoits are invariably made of rope, so as to avoid damaging the ship's deck, but there are no universally agreed standards or rules - partly because of the game's informal nature and partly because the game has to adapt to the shape and area of each particular ship it is played upon.

Players take it in turn to throw three or four hoops at a target which usually, though not always, consists of concentric circles marked on the deck. The centre point is called the jack. Occasionally this may take the form of a raised wooden peg, but more usually it is marked on the surface in the same way that the concentric circles are.

=== Slate-board quoits ===
This is a popular outdoor variation played principally in and around Pennsylvania, US (specifically the "Slate Belt" which is in the Lehigh Valley). This game uses two 1 lb (450 g) rubber quoits per player, which are pitched at a short metal pin mounted on a heavy 24 in × 24 in × 1 in (610 mm × 610 mm × 25 mm) slab of slate. The common pronunciation of quoits in the Slate Belt region is (qwaits).

Players take turns throwing a quoit at the pin. The quoit nearest the pin gets one point. If one player has two quoits nearer the pin than either of his opponent's quoits, he gets two points. A quoit that encircles the pin (called a ringer) gets three points. If all four quoits are ringers, the player who threw the last ringer gets three points only; otherwise, the first player to make 21 points wins the game. For two or four players.

=== Garden quoits and hoopla ===
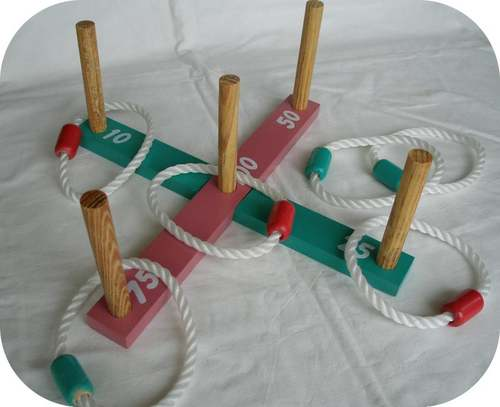
Typical set of garden quoits

This version of the game exists largely as a form of recreation, or as a game of skill found typically at fairgrounds and village fetes.

There are no leagues or universally accepted standards of play and players normally agree upon the rules before play commences.

Garden quoit and hoopla sets can be purchased in shops and usually involve players taking it in turns to throw rope or wooden hoops over one or more spikes.

The fairground version typically involves a person paying the stallholder for the opportunity to throw one or more wooden hoops over a prize, which if done successfully, they can keep. Generally speaking, the odds of winning are normally heavily weighted in favour of the stallholder unless the cost of play is higher than the value of the prize.

== Current leagues ==
=== Traditional quoits ===
==== United Kingdom ====
- Allen Valley Quoits League, Northumberland.
- Danby Invitation Quoits League, North Yorkshire.
- Lower Dales Quoits League, North Yorkshire.
- North Yorkshire Moors League, North Yorkshire.
- Montgomeryshire County Quoits League, Montgomeryshire.
- Mount Wagstaff (Essex) Quoits Team.
- Bures,(Suffolk) Quoits Team.

==== United States ====
- United States Quoiting Association (USQA)
- Mercer County Church Steel Quoit League, New Jersey.
- Pottstown German Club 3lb League, Pottstown Pa
- Slate Belt Men's Quoit League, Bangor PA

=== Indoor quoits ===
==== United Kingdom ====
- Forest of Dean Quoits League, Gloucestershire.
- The Builth Wells and District League, Powys.
- Kington League, Herefordshire.
- Aymestry League, Herefordshire.
- Presteigne League, Powys.
- The Whitby Indoor League, North Yorkshire.
- Clee Hill Quoits League, South Shropshire

=== Slate-board quoits ===
==== United States ====
- Bushkill Valley Quoit League, Pennsylvania
- Easton City Quoit League, Pennsylvania
- Slate Belt Quoit League, Pennsylvania
- Cohn's Quoit League, Ringoes, New Jersey
- Pottstown German Club Winter League, Pottstown, Pennsylvania
- Humble Parlor Brewing Quoit League, Philadelphia, Pennsylvania
- Easton Women's Quoit League, Lehigh Valley, Pennsylvania and Phillipsburg, New Jersey

== In film ==
- In the romance film Father Is a Bachelor, two spinsters play quoits to determine who gets to marry William Holden's character.
- Shown in the film Baron Omatsuri and the Secret Island, the sixth movie of the One Piece franchise, where the characters play a modified version of quoits as part of a challenge given by the Baron of the island.

== See also ==
- Horseshoes
- Washers
- Muckers
- Aerobie
- Ring toss
