= Horseshoes (game) =

Game of skill in the lawn game category

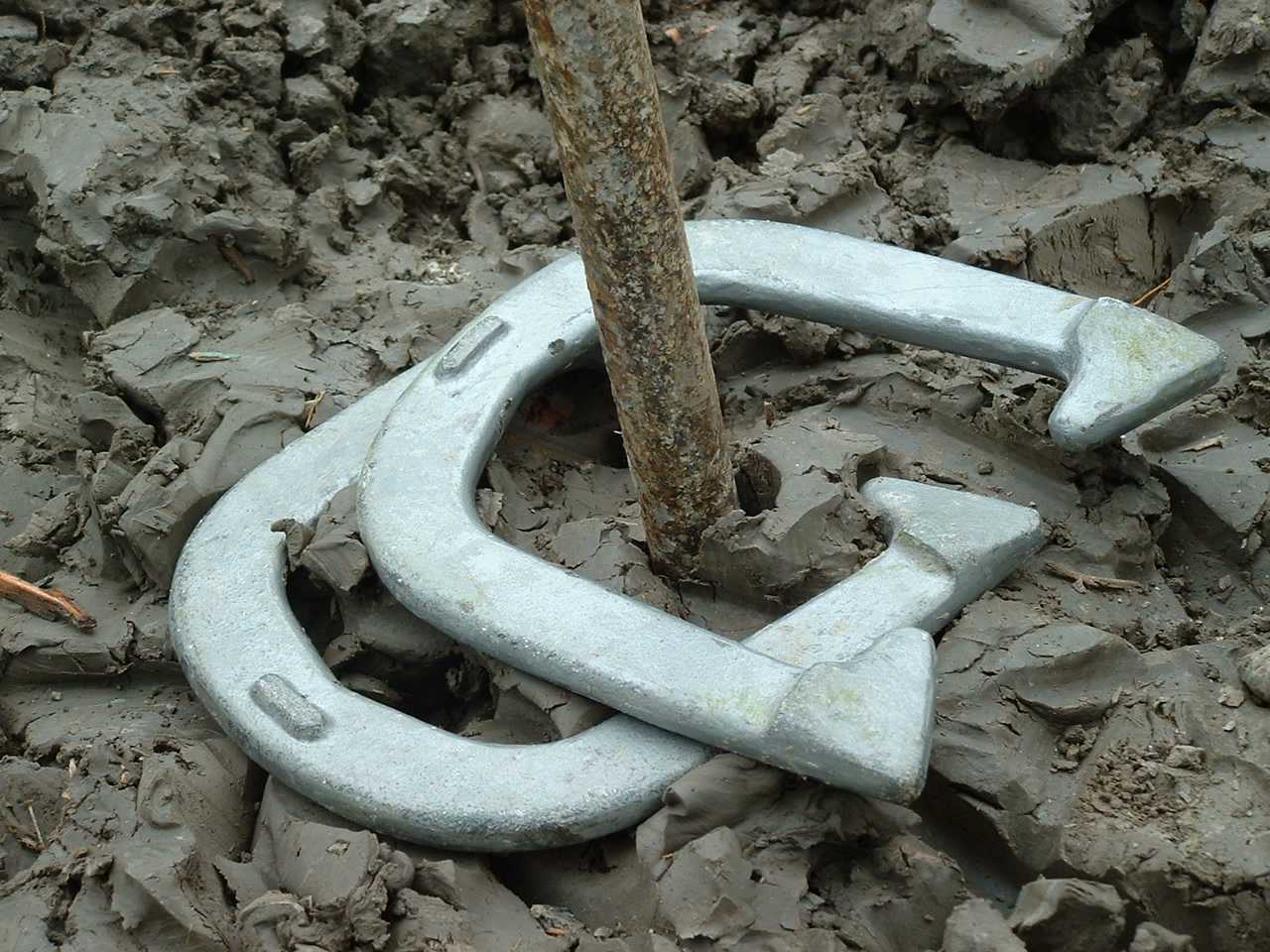
- Horseshoes
- Highest governing body: National Horseshoe Pitchers Association
- Nicknames: Pitch

Characteristics
- Contact: non-contact
- Team members: individual

Presence
- Olympic: non-Olympic

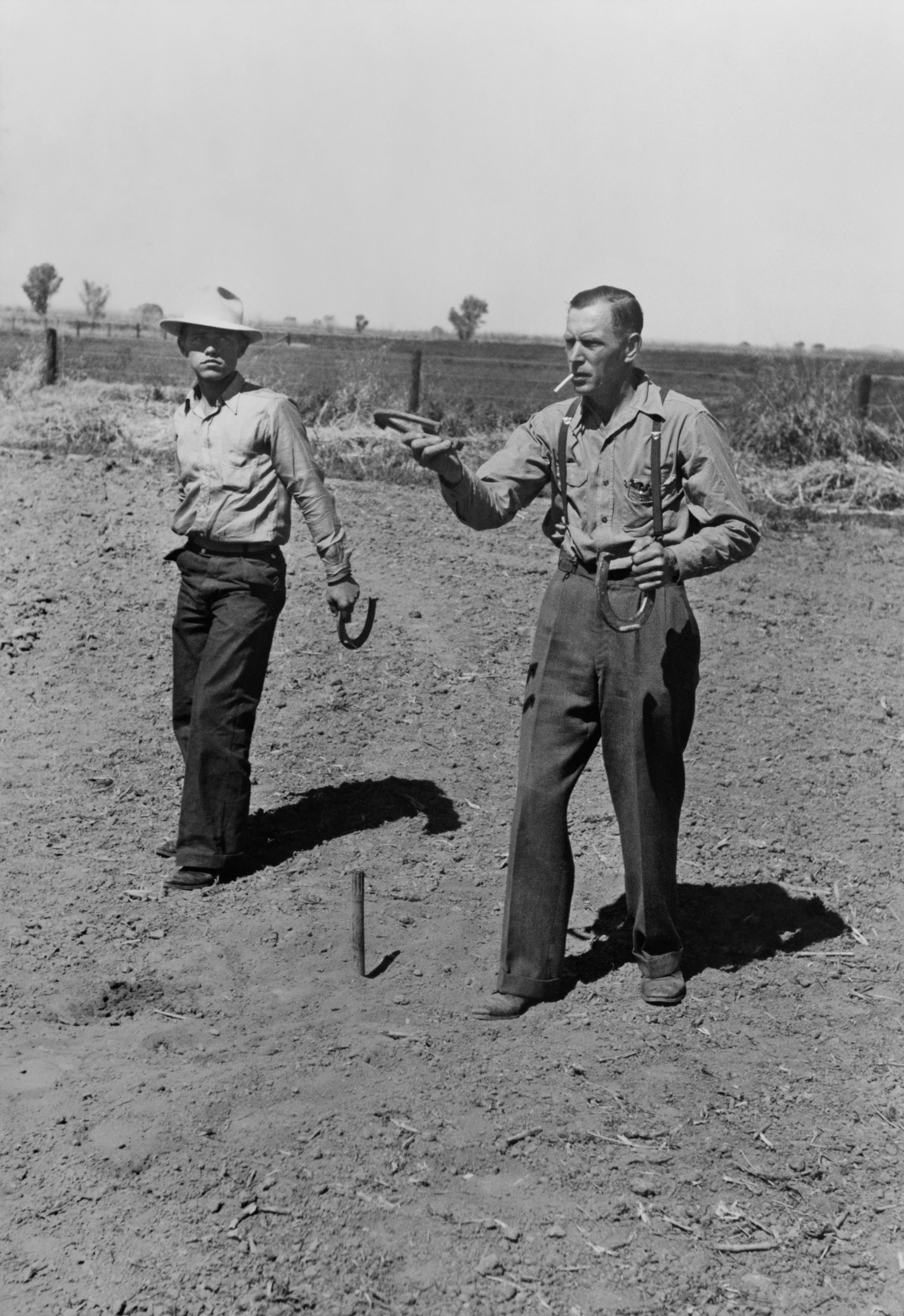
Horseshoe pitching contest at the annual field day of the FSA farmworkers community, Yuma, Arizona

Horseshoes is a lawn game played between two people (or two teams of two people) using four horseshoes and two throwing targets (stakes) set in a lawn or sandbox area. The game is played by the players alternating turns tossing horseshoes at stakes in the ground, which are traditionally placed 40 feet (12 m) apart. Modern games use a more stylized U-shaped bar, about twice the size of an actual horseshoe.

== Game play ==
=== NHPA Official Rules of the Game of Horseshoes ===
The National Horseshoe Pitchers Association (NHPA), the sport of horseshoes' governing body, maintains a set of rules and their specifications of the game on their website. They outline the style of play, the two most common scoring methods (cancellation and count-all), acceptable equipment, and exact court specifications as well as additional methods of organizing tournament and league competitions.

=== Style of play ===
The game begins with a horseshoe flip to decide who goes first. The winner of the flip throws both horseshoes—one at a time—at the opposite stake, and then the second player throws both of their horseshoes—again, one at a time—at their end. After scoring, the next round is done in reverse order, or by throwing back at the original stake. Play continues until one player has at least 15 points, commonly 21 points, at the end of a round. NHPA sanctioned games are generally played to 30, 40, or 50 points, or a shoe limit of 30, 40 or 50 shoes. The horseshoes can be made of either plastic or metal.

== Scoring ==
In horseshoes, there are two ways to score: by throwing "ringers" or by throwing the horseshoe nearest to the stake. A ringer is a horseshoe that has been thrown in such a way as to completely encircle the stake. Disputes are settled by using a straightedge to touch the two points at the ends of the horseshoe, called "heel calks". If the straightedge does not touch the stake at any point, the throw is classified as a ringer.

One player pitches both shoes in succession to one pit, followed by the other player. This is formally called an inning. Normally only one pitcher can score points per inning, however some leagues and tournaments play "count all", in which all points in each inning are counted. A live shoe that is not a ringer, but comes to rest 6 inches (150 mm) or closer to the stake, has a value of one point (alternate scoring methods give two points if the horseshoe leans on the stake. Also known as a "leaner"). If both of one player's horseshoes are closer than the opponent's, two points are scored. A ringer scores three points. In the case of one ringer and a closer horseshoe, both horseshoes are scored for a total of four points. If a player throws two ringers, that player scores six points. If each player throws a ringer, the ringers cancel and no points are scored. Such occurrences are called "dead ringers" and are still used toward the pitcher/ringer average. If two ringers are thrown by one player and one ringer by the opponent, the player throwing two ringers scores three points. This is typically called "two dead and three" or "three ringers three" for score-keeping purposes. Back-yard games can be played to any number of points that is agreed upon, but are usually to 21 points, win by 2. In most sanctioned tournaments the handicapped divisions pitch 50 shoe games, most points win. If there is a tie, the pitchers pitch two additional innings (alternating pitch) until the tie is broken. Championship divisions, or non-handicapped divisions are pitched to 40 points, regardless of the number of shoes pitched.

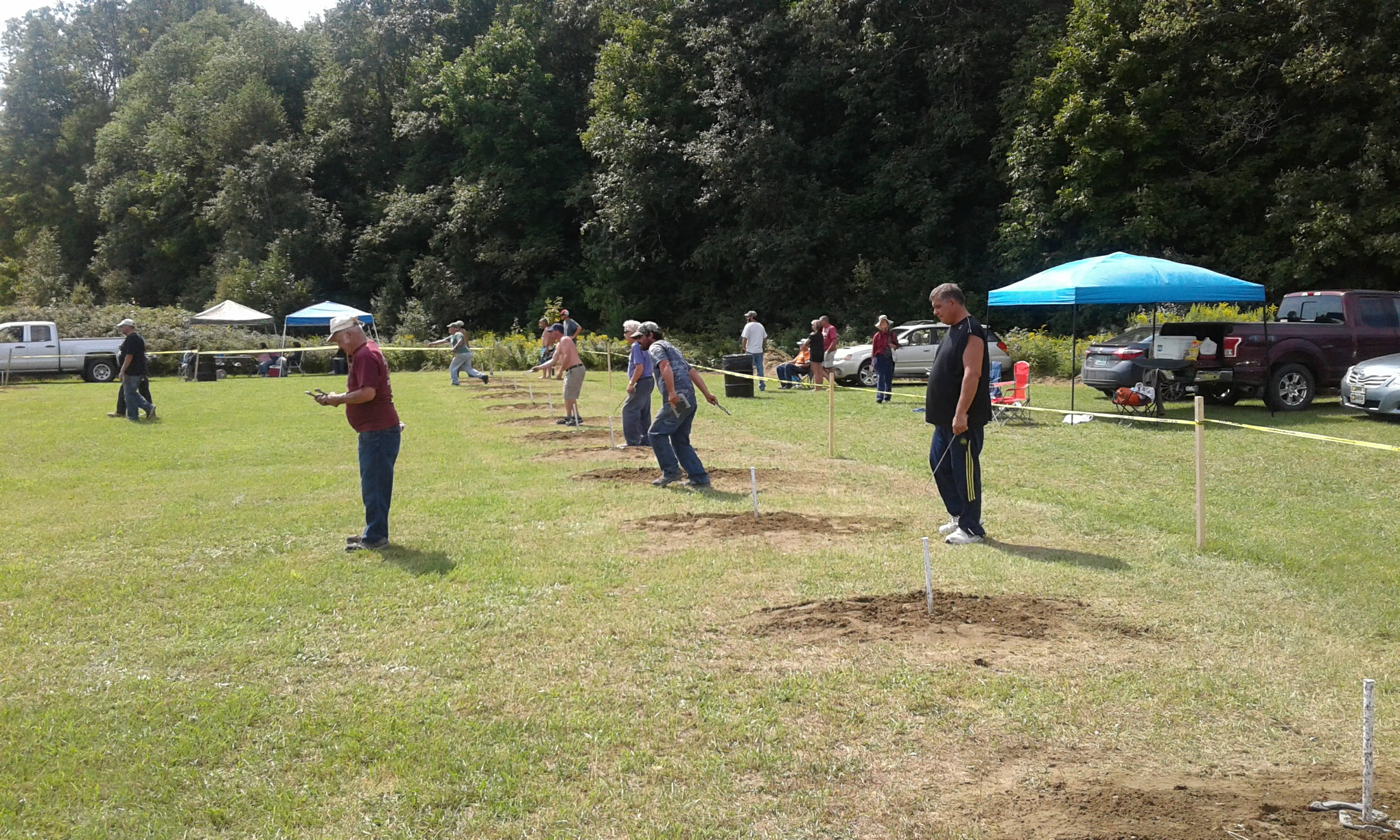
Horseshoe tournament on Sheffield Field Day, September 4 (Labor Day), 2017, in Sheffield, Vermont.

Single points in amateur games must measure 6 inches or less from any part of the shoe to the nearest part of the stake. Also, a game cannot be won when an opposing player, tossing a shoe, bumps an opponent's shoe to cause the opponent to reach the winning score. The game-winning point must be attained by the person tossing the horseshoe pertaining to their own score. Examples: If a player has 10 points and an opponent has 8 points, and the player with 10 points tosses a horseshoe and bumps their opponent's horseshoe for a ringer, the opponent scores 3 points for a total of 11 points, but does not win the game because of the two-point rule. If a player has 9 points and an opponent 8 points and the player with 9 points tosses a horseshoe and bumps his opponent's horseshoe for a ringer, the opponent cannot score 3 points, because the winning point must be attained by their own toss. However, the opponent can take two points, bringing their total point score to 10.

This scoring system gives rise to the popular expression "Close only counts in horseshoes", or alternatively "Close only counts in horseshoes and hand grenades".

== History ==
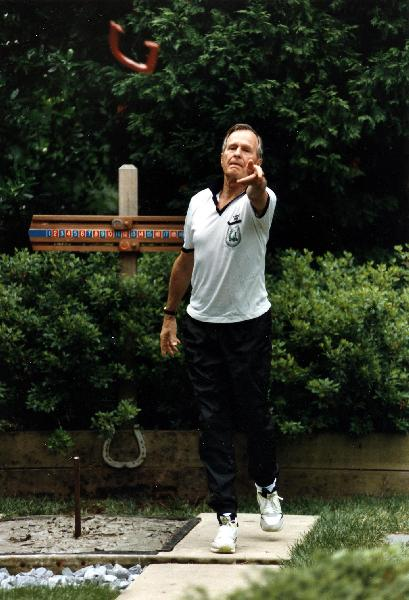
George H. W. Bush playing horseshoes at the White House horseshoe pit in 1992

The games of horseshoes and quoits are closely related. At the beginning of the twentieth century, there was general agreement about how horseshoes should be played, but details differed. Organizers of horseshoe matches published their own rules in local newspapers. The most dramatic difference from the modern game was the peg or pin, as the center stake was called, which protruded only 2 inches (51 mm) from the ground. The horseshoes were true horseshoes, nearly circular in shape, and, as in quoits, the expectation was that a ringer would land around the peg and remain there, some insisting the shoe not touch the peg.

In the 1907 "World Championship", shoes that rested 2 feet (0.61 m) from the peg were declared foul, and cost the player a half-point each. A player could score one or two points if his shoes were closer to the peg than his opponent's. Ringers scored five points, and leaners, three. The scoring rewarded with 10 points a player who capped or slid under an opponent's ringer with one of their own, a difficult achievement with a 2-inch peg. Topping two ringers by an opponent with a ringer of one's own earned fifteen points, and two ringers topping two ringers counted twenty-one points. There were similar rewards for topping a leaner with a leaner or a leaner with a ringer.

In 1920, the Chicago Horseshoe Tournament prescribed a peg 8 inches (200 mm) above the ground. A shoe resting 2 feet from the peg was still foul, but no longer cost the player points. A distinction was made between a perfect ringer, which circled the peg when it struck the ground, and a scratch ringer, which circled the peg in some other manner. These scored five points and three points respectively. Leaners were also worth three points. There were no bonuses for topping opponents.

By 1925, local newspapers were citing the rules used at the national tournament, "as adopted by the national association January 1, 1925." Stakes were 40 feet apart and projected upward 10 inches (250 mm). The scoring was close to what is observed today, without penalty points, bonuses for topping, or special attention to leaners.

Even in more recent years, local rules continue. "Whether a 'leaner' will count as one or two points is up to the home team" in one contest. As successful as the NHPA has been, there are still those who find a park, drive stakes in the ground about thirteen strides apart, and wait for others to appear once the chiming begins.

A horseshoe pit was built at the White House in the 1940s by President Harry Truman. The horseshoe champion Jimmy Risk demonstrated his skills at the pit for Truman and Admiral Chester W. Nimitz in 1946. The pit was recreated by President George H. W. Bush in 1989. Bush became an avid player of the game and hosted tournaments with White House domestic staff, family members, and administration personnel. Bush also demonstrated the game for visiting dignitaries including Queen Elizabeth II and the Russian president Boris Yeltsin.

== Gallery ==
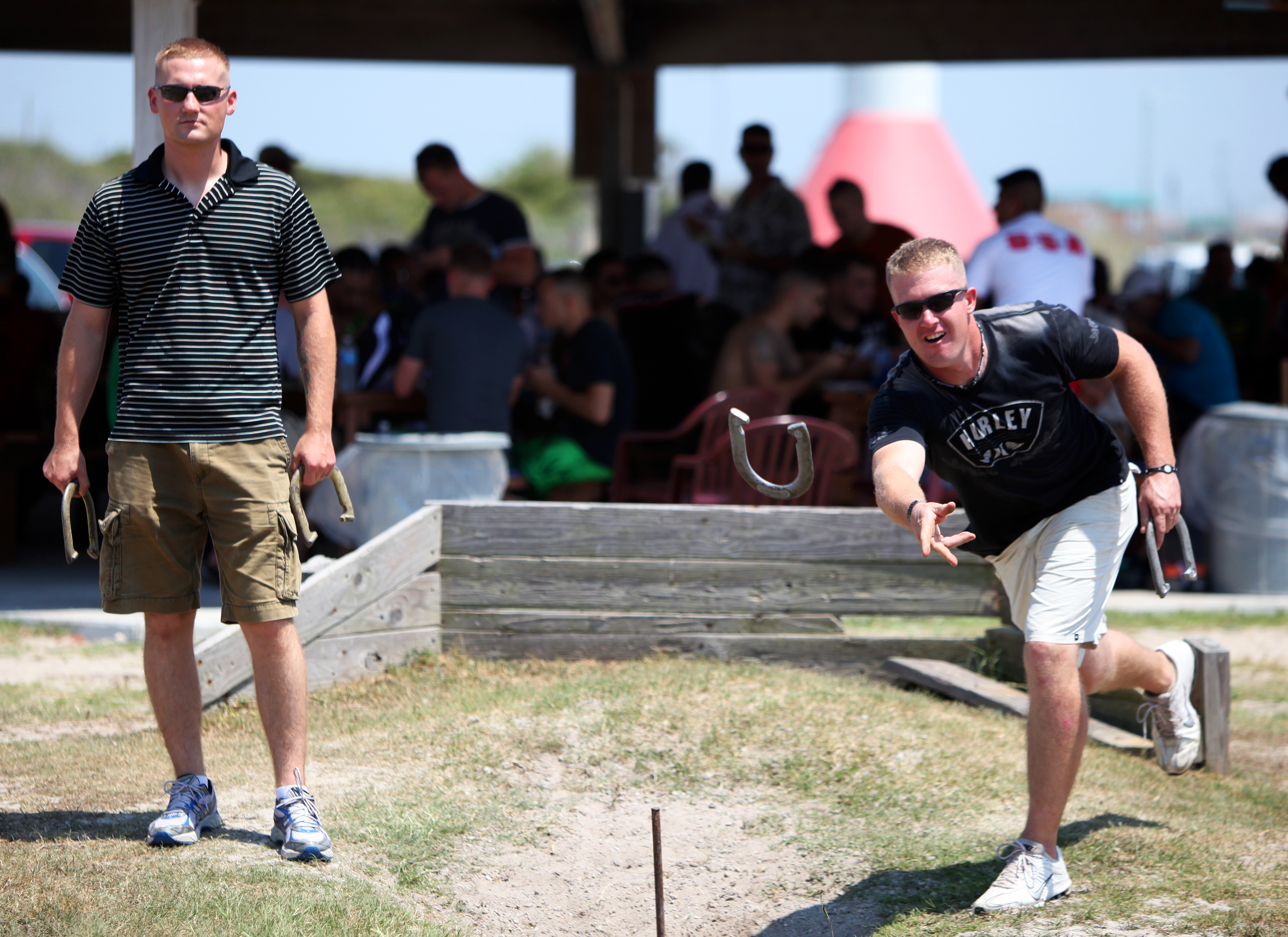
A game of horseshoes

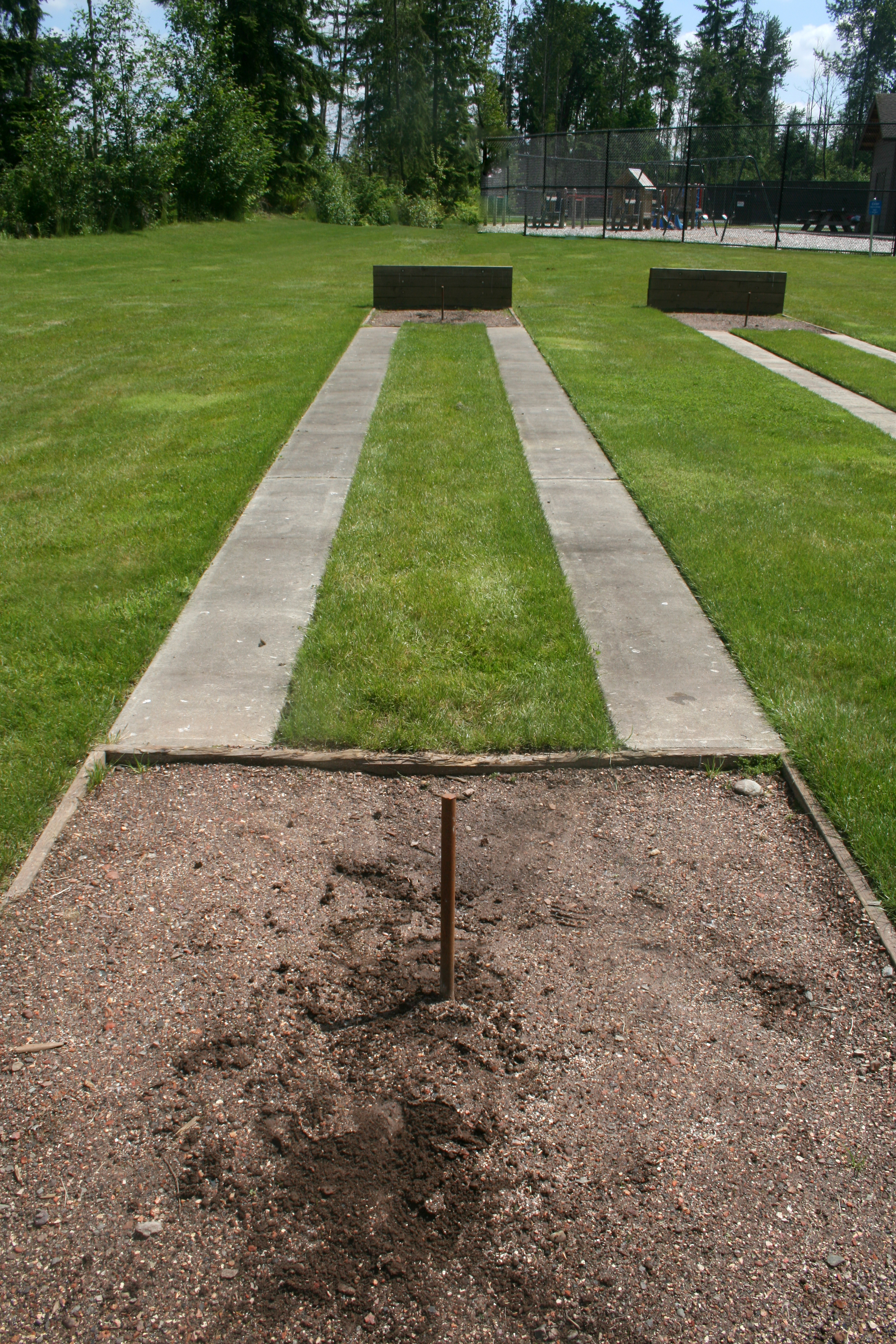
A horseshoes court

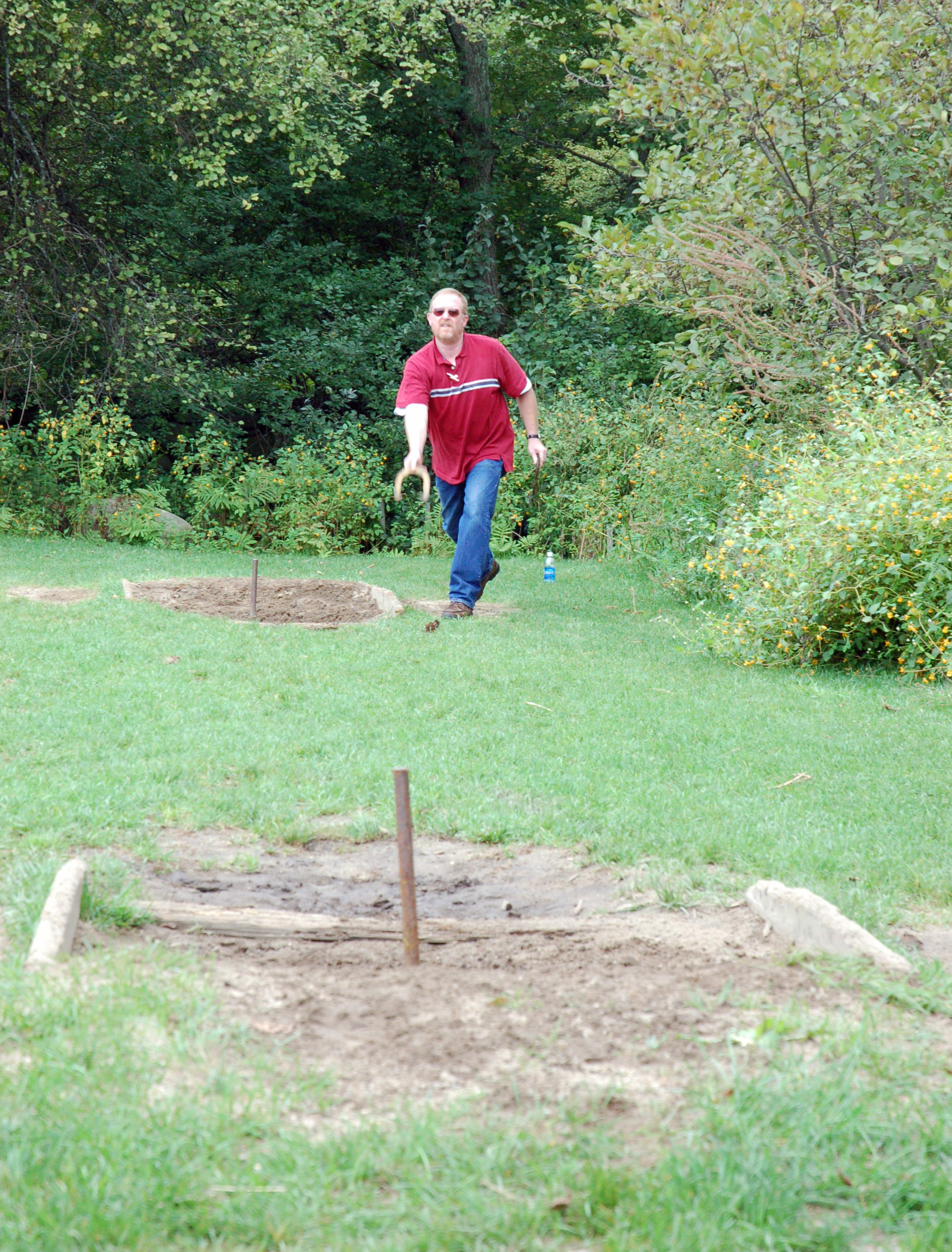
A player prepares to toss a horseshoe.

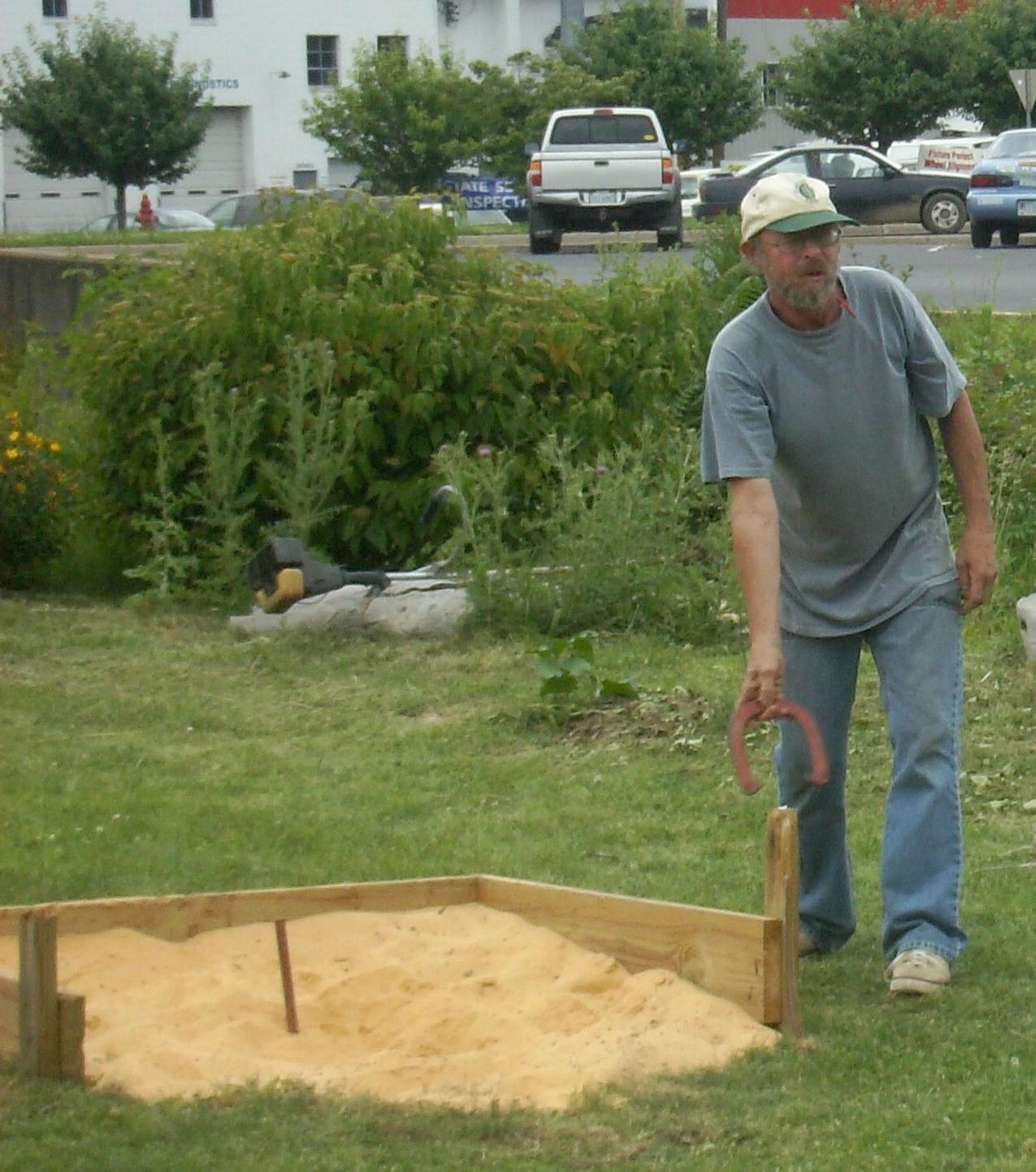
Teig Hogan prepares to toss horseshoe at the 2008 Our Community Place Lawn Jam in Harrisonburg, Virginia.

== See also ==
- Cornhole
- Digor
- Gorodki
- Muckers
- Quoits
- Ring toss
- Washers
