= Jollyball =

Ball game

A cross between juggling and volleyball, Jollyball is usually played on a badminton court with two or three players on each team. Each player has two juggling balls and a final ball is held by the server, who serves by throwing the ball into the opponent's side of the court. This must be "caught" by one of the opponents, by using the ball to perform a three-ball juggling pattern (commonly the three-ball cascade). They are allowed three catches before one of the balls (not necessarily the one that was served) must be thrown to another player, or passed back across the net. Like volleyball, only three passes are allowed by a team before the ball must be returned.

Teams score by causing the ball to land in the opponent's side of the court, causing the opposition to throw a ball out of bounds, or fail to complete a juggling pattern. Games are relatively informal, and players are encouraged to show off their juggling skills for spectators.
