= Toad in the hole (game) =

British throwing game

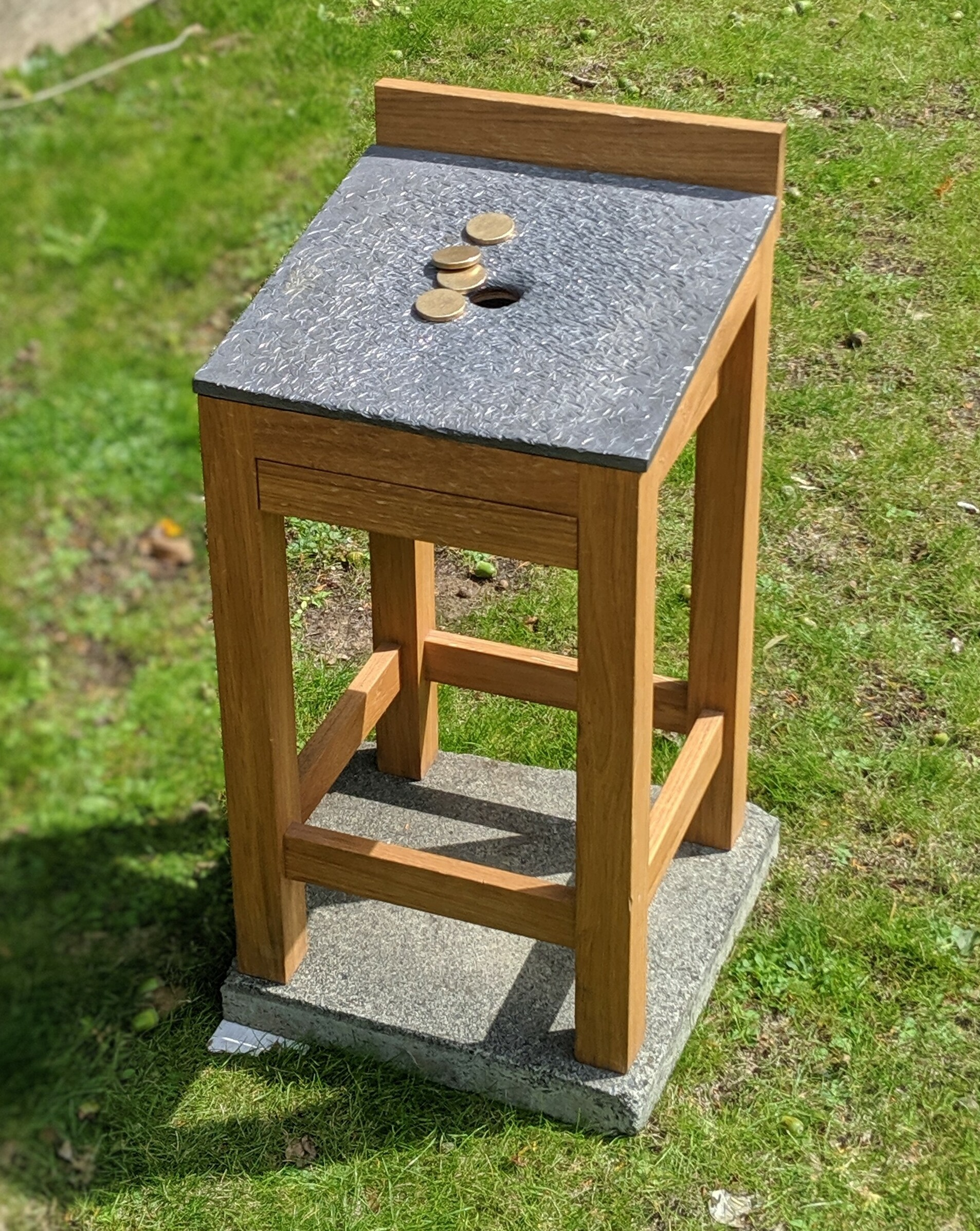
A Toad in the hole, or "Toads" table

Toad in the hole is a pub game, involving throwing brass coins at a lead-topped table with a hole in the middle. The game is a more refined version of the coin-throwing game pitch penny.

The game itself involves throwing four brass coins or "toads" from the same distance as a dart board, to a square toad table, made of wooden legs and with a lead surface. If a toad goes down the hole it scores two points, or if it lands on the top it scores one point. If it hits the back of the table or falls off, the throw is void it scores nothing. A maximum of eight points can be scored each turn, and scoring is recorded in darts fashion, playing from 31 down. The first competitor throws two toads, with their opponent then throwing three, and from then on they throw all four, until they reach scores of less than four, wherein only the number of toads equal to the required finishing score may be thrown. Like darts, players must finish exactly - scoring more results in the player being "bust".

At tournament level, participants play best of three, and best of five in the final.

The original league in the United Kingdom is based in East Sussex, and has three divisions, involving roughly 21 teams based in pubs around the county. There is also a major "international competition", run by the Lions Club in Lewes and held in that town every year. More recently, a Brighton & Hove league was set up in 2021, involving local pubs and venues.

== International competition winners ==
- 1995 Lewes Arms
- 1996 Lewes Arms
- 1997 Brack Mount
- 1998 Lewes Arms
- 1999 Lewes Working Men's Club
- 2000 CSBS
- 2001 Lewes Arms
- 2002 Swan Cygnets
- 2003 The Laughing Fish
- 2004 The Laughing Fish
- 2005 The Laughing Fish
- 2006 Old Azurians
- 2007 King's Head
- 2008 The Laughing Fish A
- 2009 The Laughing Fish B
- 2010 DCC
- 2011 DCC
- 2012 The Chalk Pit
- 2013 Old Azurians
- 2014 The Leek'y Boys
- 2015 The Brewers Arms
- 2016 Rodmell Toad Club
- 2017 Rodmell Toad Club
- 2018 Black Horse
- 2019 Rodmell Toad Club
- 2020 Hiatus, no contest held
- 2021 Hiatus, no contest held
- 2022 Black Horse

== Variants in other countries ==
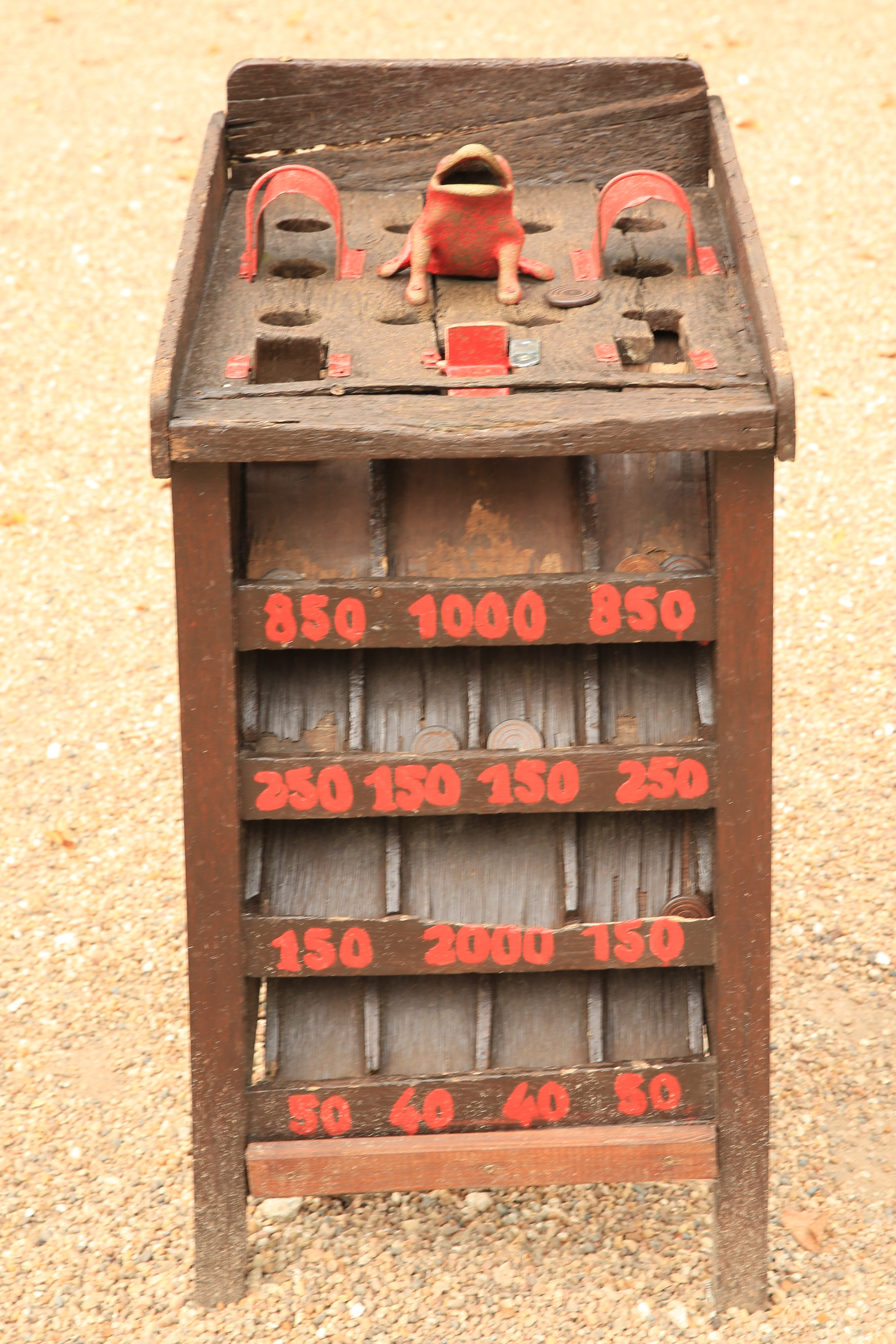
Jeu de la grenouille, at the entrance of the park of the Pagode de Chanteloup, Touraine

Variants of this English game are played wider afield in Europe, for example in Spain where it is known as juego de la rana, the Basque Country where it is known as igel jokoa, or jeu de la grenouille in France. Outside Europe, it is widely played in South America where it is variously known as juego de la rana in Chile and Colombia, juego del sapo in Peru, Uruguay and Argentina, tiro al sapo in Bolivia and Peru. The game is also played in St. Louis, Missouri where it is also referred to as simply rana.

A similar American game is washer pitching.
