= The Amazing Race 31 =

Season of television series

- Season 31
- Region 1 DVD cover
- Presented by: Phil Keoghan
- No. of teams: 11
- Winners: Colin Guinn & Christie Woods
- No. of legs: 12
- Distance traveled: 25,000 mi (40,000 km)
- No. of episodes: 12

Release
- Original network: CBS
- Original release: April 17 – June 26, 2019

Additional information
- Filming dates: June 10 – July 3, 2018

Series chronology
- ← Previous; Season 30 Next → Season 32

The Amazing Race 31 (also promoted as The Amazing Race: Reality Showdown) is the thirty-first season of the American reality competition show The Amazing Race. Hosted by Phil Keoghan, it featured eleven teams of two, each consisting of former contestants from CBS's flagship reality shows, Big Brother, Survivor, and The Amazing Race, competing in a race around the world to win US$1,000,000. This season visited four continents and ten countries and traveled over 25,000 miles (40,000 km) during twelve legs. Starting in Hermosa Beach, California, racers traveled through Japan, Laos, Vietnam, the United Arab Emirates, Uganda, Switzerland, Croatia, the Netherlands, and England before returning to the United States and finishing in Detroit. New elements introduced in this season include the U-Turn Vote. Elements of the show that returned for this season include the starting line task. The season premiered on CBS on April 17, 2019, and concluded on June 26, 2019.

All three of the final teams consisted of returning players from previous seasons of The Amazing Race. Life partners Colin Guinn and Christie Woods, who had competed on The Amazing Race 5, were the winners of this season. Best friends Tyler Oakley and Korey Kuhl, who had competed on The Amazing Race 28, finished in second place; and cousins Leo Temory and Jamal Zadran, who had competed on The Amazing Race 23 and The Amazing Race 24, finished in third place.

== Format ==
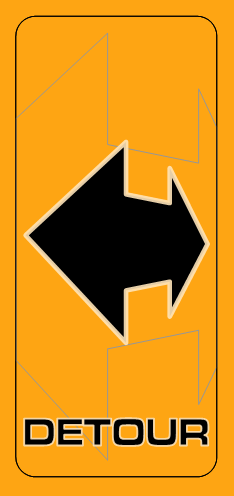
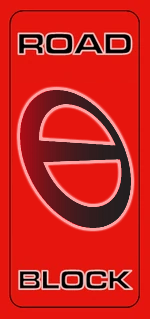
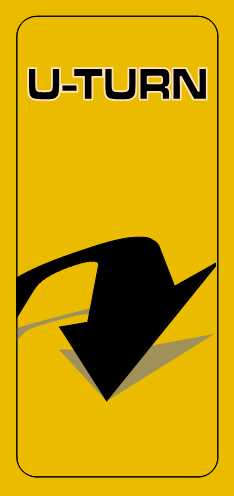
The clues which contestants receive during the course of the race generally fall into four categories: Route Info, Detour, Roadblock, and U-Turn.

The Amazing Race is a reality television show created by Bertram van Munster and Elise Doganieri, and hosted by Phil Keoghan. The series follows teams of two competing in a race around the world. Each leg of the race requires teams to deduce clues, navigate foreign environments, interact with locals, perform physical and mental challenges, and travel on a limited budget provided by the show. At each stop during the leg, teams receive clues inside sealed envelopes, which fall into one of these categories:

- Route Info: These are simple instructions that teams must follow before they can receive their next clue.
- Detour: A Detour is a choice between two tasks. Teams may choose either task and switch tasks if they find one option too difficult. There is usually one Detour present on each leg.
- Roadblock: A Roadblock is a task that only one team member can complete. Teams must choose which member will complete the task based on a brief clue they receive before fully learning the details of the task. There is usually one Roadblock present on each leg.
- U-Turn: The U-Turn allows teams to force another team to complete both options of the Detour before they can continue the race.
- Speed Bump: A penalty for teams who finished in last place on a non-elimination leg. It required the team to complete an additional task in the following leg that only they had to complete.

Most teams who arrive last at the Pit Stop of each leg are progressively eliminated, while the first team to arrive at the finish line in the final episode wins the grand prize of US$1,000,000.

== Contestants ==
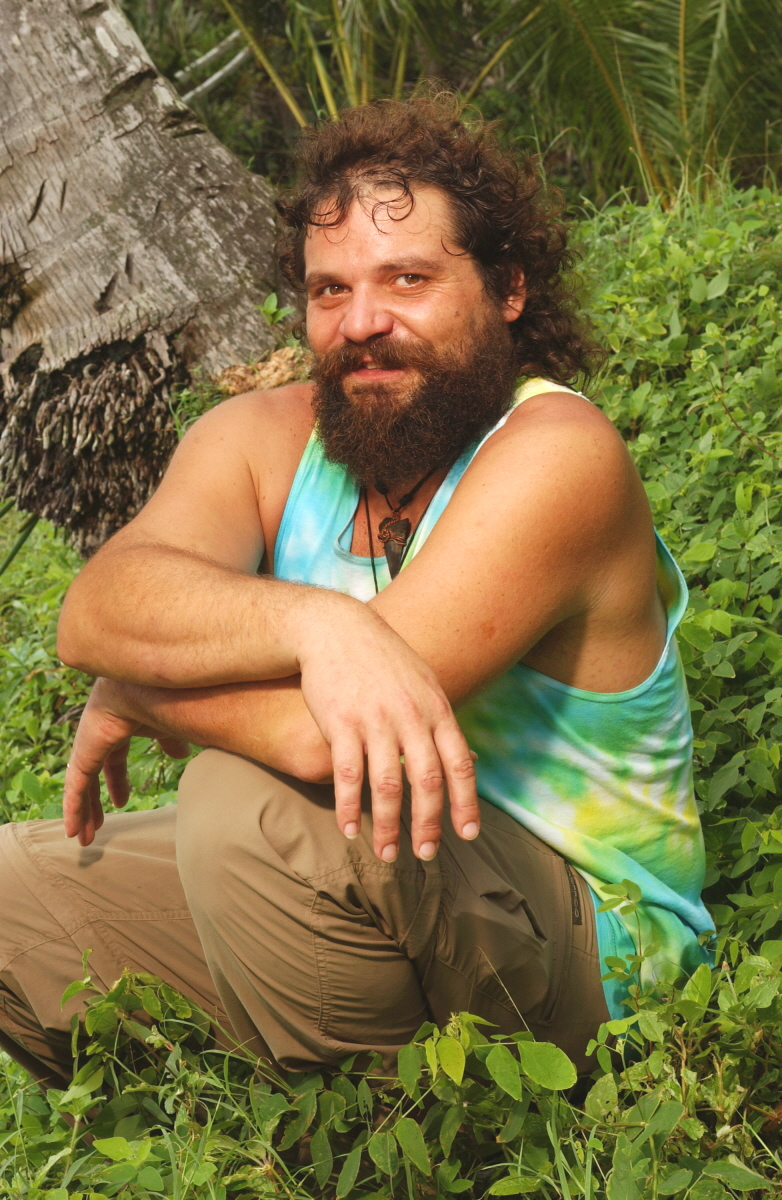
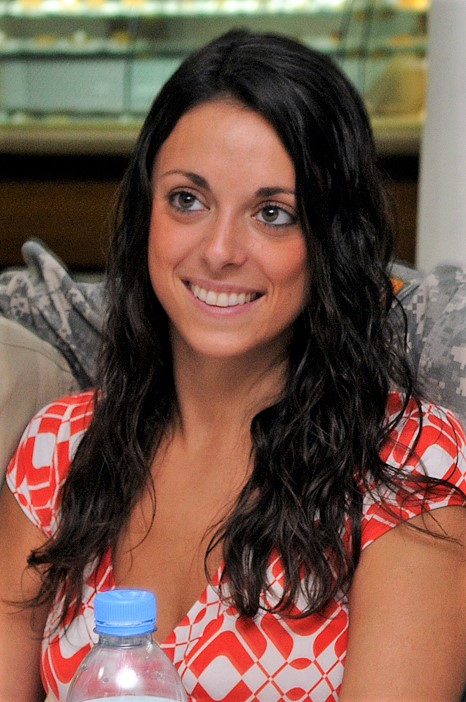
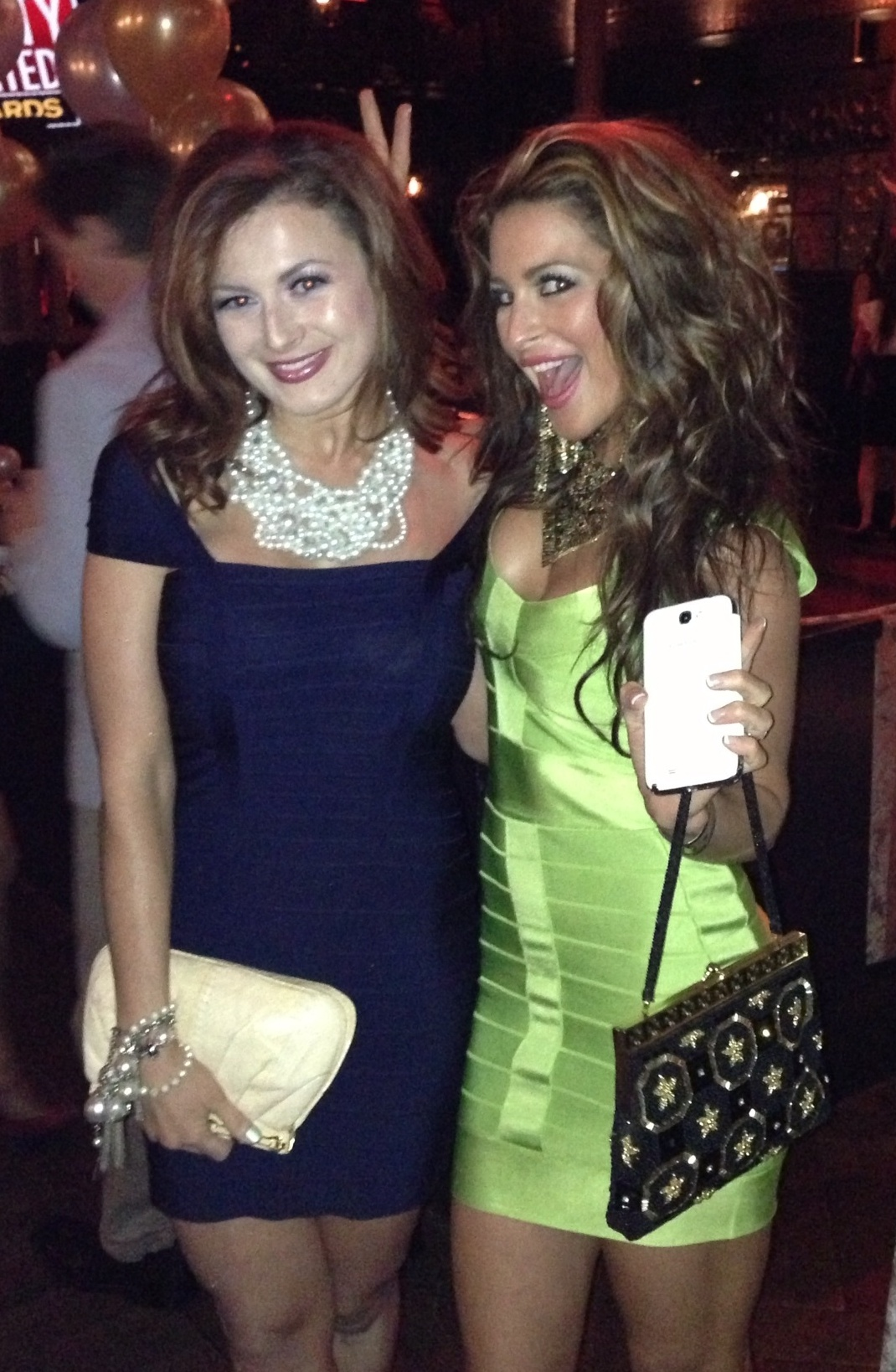
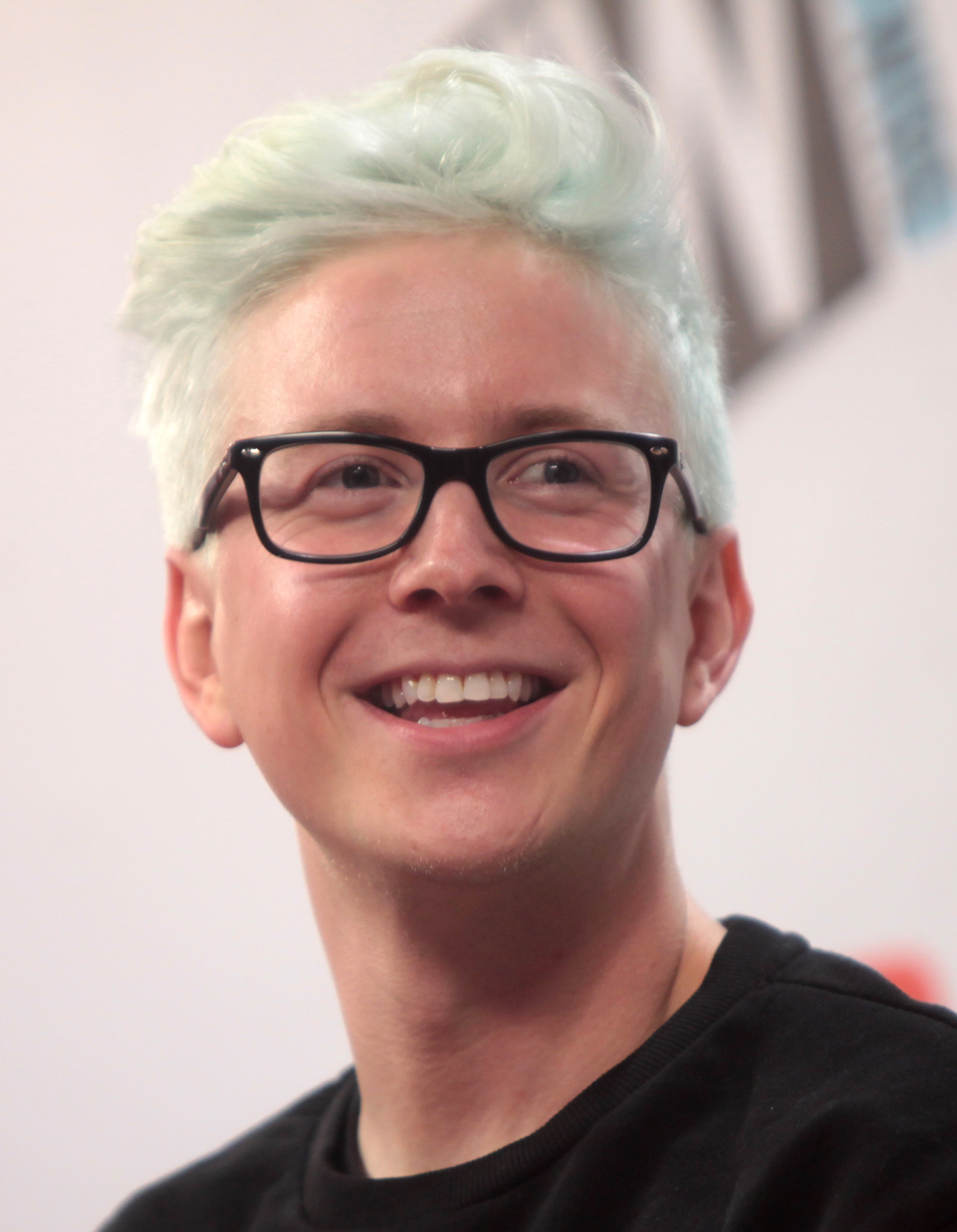
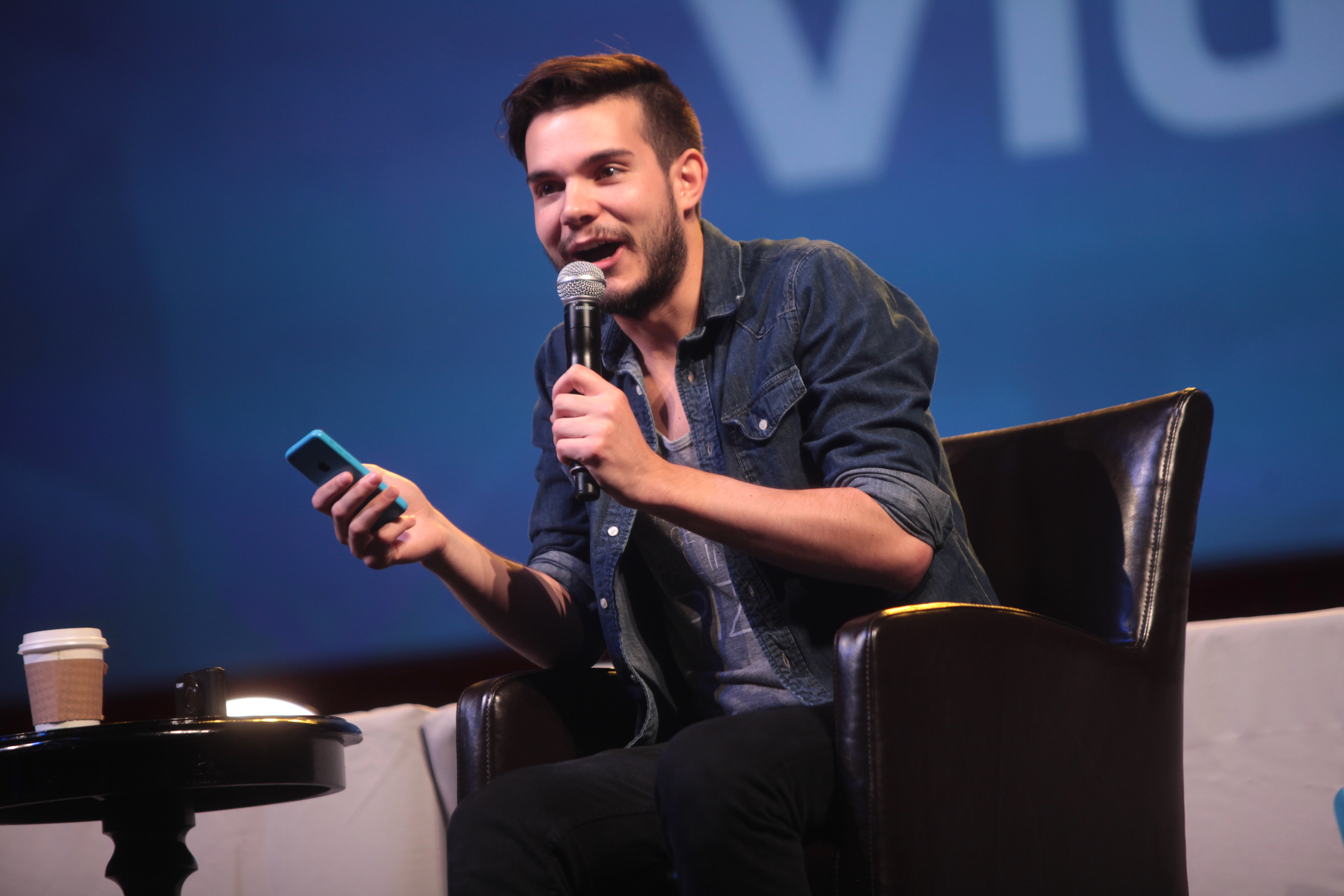
From left to right: Rupert Boneham, Eliza Orlins, Rachel Reilly, Elissa Slater, Tyler Oakley, and Korey Kuhl

This season involved eleven teams, three of whom previously competed on Big Brother, three of whom previously competed on Survivor, and five of whom previously competed on The Amazing Race.

Contestants	Age	Relationship	Hometown	Status
Art Velez	49	Best Friends (The Amazing Race)	Temecula, California	Eliminated 1st (in Tokyo, Japan)
J.J. Carrell	49	Best Friends (The Amazing Race)	San Marcos, California	Eliminated 1st (in Tokyo, Japan)
Rupert Boneham	54	Married (Survivor)	Indianapolis, Indiana	Eliminated 2nd (in Ban Xiengkeo, Laos)
Laura Boneham	49	Married (Survivor)	Indianapolis, Indiana	Eliminated 2nd (in Ban Xiengkeo, Laos)
Corinne Kaplan	39	Friends (Survivor)	Denver, Colorado	Eliminated 3rd (in Ho Chi Minh City, Vietnam)
Eliza Orlins	35	Friends (Survivor)	New York City, New York	Eliminated 3rd (in Ho Chi Minh City, Vietnam)
Janelle Pierzina	38	Friends (Big Brother)	Lakeville, Minnesota	Eliminated 4th (in Kampala, Uganda)
Britney Haynes	30	Friends (Big Brother)	Tulsa, Oklahoma	Eliminated 4th (in Kampala, Uganda)
Rachel Reilly	33	Sisters (Big Brother)	Van Nuys, California	Eliminated 5th (in Brienz, Switzerland)
Elissa Slater	32	Sisters (Big Brother)	Las Vegas, Nevada	Eliminated 5th (in Brienz, Switzerland)
Chris Hammons	40	Friends (Survivor)	Moore, Oklahoma	Eliminated 6th (in Split, Croatia)
Bret LaBelle	44	Friends (Survivor)	Dedham, Massachusetts	Eliminated 6th (in Split, Croatia)
Becca Droz	28	Friends (The Amazing Race)	Boulder, Colorado	Eliminated 7th (in Giethoorn, Netherlands)
Floyd Pierce	23	Friends (The Amazing Race)	Highlands Ranch, Colorado	Eliminated 7th (in Giethoorn, Netherlands)
Nicole Franzel	25	Dating (Big Brother)	Ubly, Michigan	Eliminated 8th (in London, England)
Victor Arroyo	27	Dating (Big Brother)	Slidell, Louisiana	Eliminated 8th (in London, England)
Leo Temory	31	Cousins (The Amazing Race)	Pasadena, California	Third place
Jamal Zadran	31	Cousins (The Amazing Race)	Houston, Texas	Third place
Tyler Oakley	29	Best Friends (The Amazing Race)	Jackson, Michigan	Runners-up
Korey Kuhl	33	Best Friends (The Amazing Race)	Jackson, Michigan	Runners-up
Colin Guinn	38	Life Partners (The Amazing Race)	Austin, Texas	Winners
Christie Woods	40	Life Partners (The Amazing Race)	Austin, Texas	Winners

From Big Brother:

- Janelle Pierzina competed on Big Brother 6, Big Brother 7, and Big Brother 14.
- Britney Haynes competed on Big Brother 12 and Big Brother 14.
- Nicole Franzel competed on Big Brother 16 and Big Brother 18.
- Victor Arroyo competed on Big Brother 18.
- Rachel Reilly competed on Big Brother 12 and Big Brother 13. (Rachel also competed on The Amazing Race 20 and The Amazing Race 24.)
- Elissa Slater competed on Big Brother 15.

From Survivor:

- Chris Hammons and Bret LaBelle competed on Survivor: Millennials vs. Gen X.
- Corinne Kaplan competed on Survivor: Gabon and Survivor: Caramoan.
- Eliza Orlins competed on Survivor: Vanuatu and Survivor: Micronesia.
- Rupert Boneham competed on Survivor: Pearl Islands, Survivor: All-Stars, Survivor: Heroes vs. Villains, and Survivor: Blood vs. Water.
- Laura Boneham competed on Survivor: Blood vs. Water.

From The Amazing Race:

- Art Velez and J.J. Carrell competed on The Amazing Race 20.
- Colin Guinn and Christie Woods competed on The Amazing Race 5.
- Leo Temory and Jamal Zadran competed on The Amazing Race 23 and The Amazing Race 24.
- Becca Droz and Floyd Pierce competed on The Amazing Race 29.
- Tyler Oakley and Korey Kuhl competed on The Amazing Race 28.

Future appearances

Janelle Pierzina and Nicole Franzel returned to Big Brother to compete on the show's second All-Stars season. On September 3, 2020, Bret LaBelle appeared on Revenge Prank. In 2022, Leo Temory competed on the first season of The Challenge: USA. Pierzina and Rachel Reilly competed on the USA Network reality competition series, Snake in the Grass. In 2023, Reilly also competed on the Peacock reality TV series The Traitors. Britney Haynes appeared on the premiere of Big Brother 25. Pierzina competed on the second season of The Traitors. In 2023, Haynes and Franzel competed on Big Brother Reindeer Games. In 2024, Haynes competed on the third season of The Traitors. In 2025, Reilly competed on Worst Cooks in America Celebrity Edition: Heroes vs. Villains. Later in the year, Reilly competed on Big Brother 27.

== Contestant progress ==
The following teams are listed with their placements in each leg. Placements are listed in finishing order.

- A red placement with a dagger (†) indicates that the team was eliminated.
- An underlined blue placement with a double-dagger (‡) indicates that the team was the last to arrive at a Pit Stop in a non-elimination leg, and had to perform a Speed Bump task in the following leg.
- A brown ⊃ indicates that the team used the U-Turn and a brown ⊂ indicates the team on the receiving end of the U-Turn.

Team placement (by leg)
Team	1	2	3	4	5	6	7	8	9	10	11	12
Colin & Christie	2nd	4th	3rd	1st	3rd	2nd	2nd	3rd⊂ (Note: In leg 8, the teams voted for two teams to be U-Turned; Colin & Christie and Rachel & Elissa received the most votes.)	4th	1st	3rd	1st
Tyler & Korey	3rd	7th⊂ (Note: Becca & Floyd chose to use the U-Turn on Tyler & Korey.)	4th	5th	4th	1st	1st	1st	1st	2nd	2nd	2nd
Leo & Jamal	1st	1st	8th	6th	7th	6th	4th	6th	5th	3rd⊃ (Note: Leo & Jamal chose to use the U-Turn on Nicole & Victor.)	1st	3rd
Nicole & Victor	6th	2nd	2nd	2nd	5th	3rd	7th‡	5th	2nd	4th^{⊂}_{⊃} (Note: Nicole & Victor chose to use the U-Turn on Becca & Floyd.)	4th†	
Becca & Floyd	5th	9th^{⊂}_{⊃} (Note: Rachel & Elissa chose to use the U-Turn on Becca & Floyd.)	1st	4th	1st	5th	3rd	4th	3rd	5th†⊂		
Chris & Bret	7th	8th	9th‡	3rd	2nd	4th	6th	2nd	6th†			
Rachel & Elissa	4th	3rd⊃	7th	8th	8th‡	7th	5th	7th†⊂				
Janelle & Britney	8th	5th	6th	7th	6th	8th†						
Corinne & Eliza	9th	6th	5th	9th†								
Rupert & Laura	10th	10th†										
Art & J.J.	11th† (Note: Art & J.J. were given a 4-hour penalty when Art chose to quit the second Roadblock. Rupert & Laura checked in during this penalty time, dropping Art & J.J. to last.)											

== Race summary ==
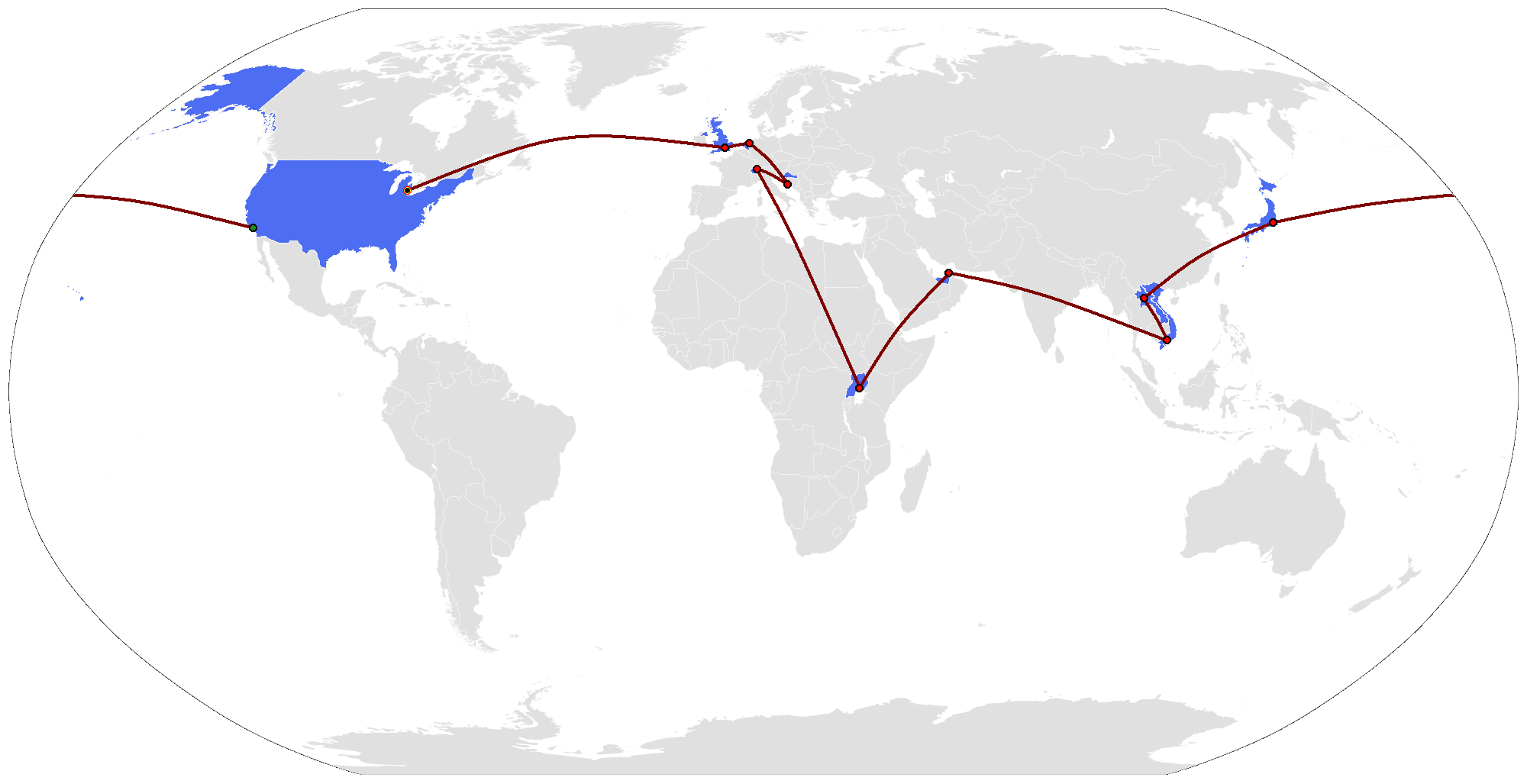
The route of The Amazing Race 31.

Destinations	Air travel Rail travel Water travel Bus travel Helicopter travel Bicycle travel Gondola travel
Route Markers	Detour Roadblock Head-to-Head U-Turn Speed Bump Pit Stop

=== Leg 1 (United States → Japan) ===
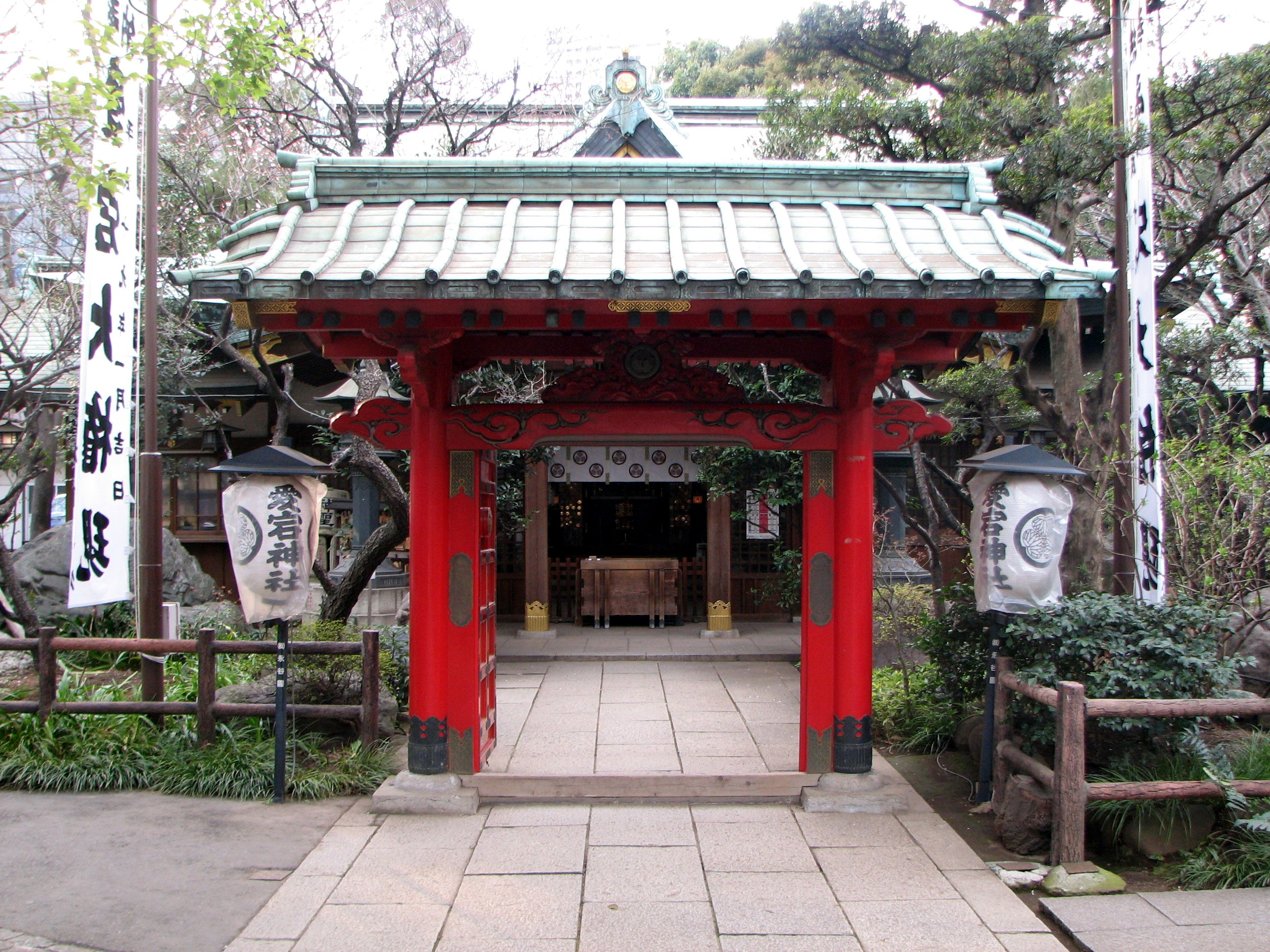
At the end of the first leg, teams had to climb up steps to reach the Pit Stop at Atago Jinja in Tokyo.

- Episode 1: "You're in Our Race Now" (April 17, 2019)
- Prize: A seven-day cruise for two to French Polynesia (awarded to Leo & Jamal)
- Eliminated: Art & J.J.

Locations

- Hermosa Beach, California (Hermosa Beach Pier) (Starting Line)
- Hermosa Beach (Hermosa City Beach)
- Los Angeles → Tokyo, Japan
- Tokyo (Narita International Airport → Shibuya)
- Tokyo (ACB Lock & Security or Tokyo Tokyo Restaurant)
- Tokyo (EDGEof Shibuya Building)
- Tokyo (Onarimon Station)
- Tokyo (Shiba Koen)
- Tokyo (Atago Jinja)

Episode summary

- Teams set off from the Hermosa Beach Pier and ran to a giant octopus-shaped sand sculpture on an adjacent beach, where they dug for their first clue that revealed their first destination: Tokyo, Japan. Once there, teams traveled by charter bus to Shibuya, where teams were instructed to travel on foot to one of two locations, ACB Lock & Security or Tokyo Tokyo Restaurant, where they received their next clue. Each location only had a limited number of clues. Teams then traveled to the EDGEof Shibuya Building in order to find their next clue.
- In this season's first Roadblock, one team member had to pick one of several getas and bite the sandal until they found one of twelve made of chocolate. Both team members then had to eat the chocolate geta in order to receive their next clue.
- After the first Roadblock, teams had to travel by taxi to Onarimon Station and then travel on foot to the nearby Shiba Koen in order to find their next clue.
- In this leg's second Roadblock, the team member who did not perform the previous Roadblock had to don a blue unitard and climb to the summit of a 20-foot (6.1 m) slippery slope that resembled Mount Fuji in order to retrieve their next clue, which directed them to the Pit Stop: Atago Jinja.

=== Leg 2 (Japan → Laos) ===
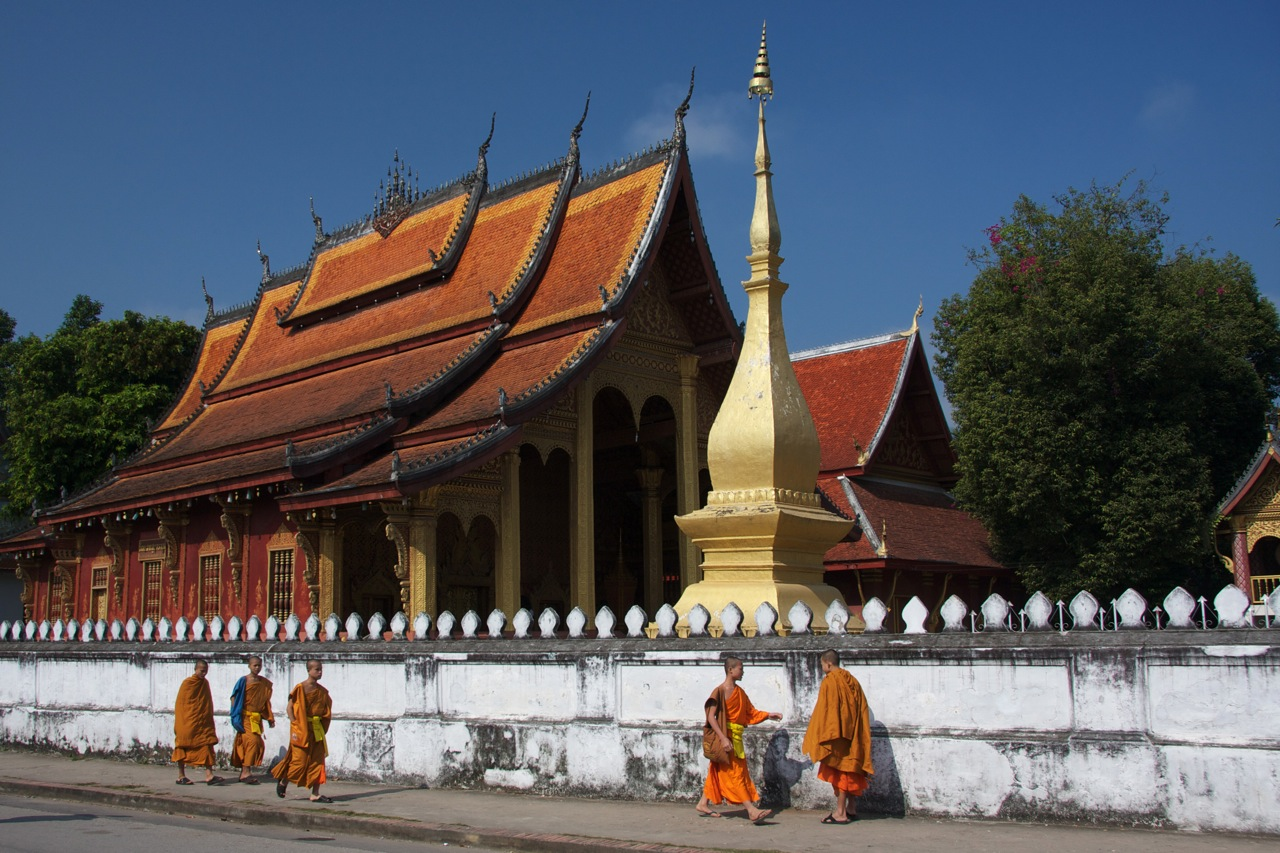
Teams began their leg in Luang Prabang at Wat Sensoukharam by giving alms of rice to monks.

- Episode 2: "Knock the Newbie Out of Us" (April 24, 2019)
- Prize: US$2,500 each (awarded to Leo & Jamal)
- Eliminated: Rupert & Laura

Locations

- Tokyo (Atago Jinja)
- Tokyo (Tickets Today)
- Tokyo → Luang Prabang, Laos
- Luang Prabang (Villa Santi)
- Luang Prabang (Wat Sensoukharam)
- Luang Prabang (Big Tree by the Mekong River)
- Luang Prabang (École Maternelle Louang Prabang or BBQ Alley)
- Ban Xieng Lom (Elephant Village)
- Luang Prabang (Wat Xieng Thong) → Ban Xiengkeo (Prince Phetsarath's Palace)

Episode summary

- At the start of this leg, teams were instructed to fly to Luang Prabang, Laos, with teams required to book their flight at Tickets Today. Once there, teams had to travel by tuk-tuk to Villa Santi and wait for their next clue to arrive by courier before sunrise. The clue instructed them to take part in the local morning alms by giving servings of sticky rice to a procession of Buddhist monks at Wat Sensoukharam. Before the monks' arrival, each team member had to don a pha biang and pick up basket of rice. After the monks passed, teams received their next clue, which directed them to a tree by the Mekong River.
- This season's first Detour was a choice between ABC or BBQ. In ABC, teams had to find the École Maternelle Louang Prabang, learn the Lao alphabet from a teacher, and pass an oral exam in order to receive their next clue. In BBQ, teams had to find BBQ Alley and purchase three ducks and eight tilapia. They then had to prepare eleven Lao barbecue skewers exactly like the skewers prepared during an ongoing demonstration in order to receive their next clue.
- After the Detour, teams had to travel by tuk-tuk to the Elephant Village, which had their next clue.
- In this leg's Roadblock, one team member had to learn a series of Lao commands and then direct an elephant across the Nam Khan River. Once across, they had to search for two men playing Hmong music on qeejs with their next clue before directing their elephant back to the start and reuniting with their partner.
- After the Roadblock, teams had to travel by tuk-tuk to Wat Xieng Thong, where they boarded a long-tail boat and traveled to the Pit Stop: Prince Phetsarath's Palace in Ban Xiengkeo.

Additional note

- This leg featured a Double U-Turn. Rachel & Elissa chose to use the U-Turn on Becca & Floyd, while Becca & Floyd chose to use the U-Turn on Tyler & Korey.

=== Leg 3 (Laos → Vietnam) ===
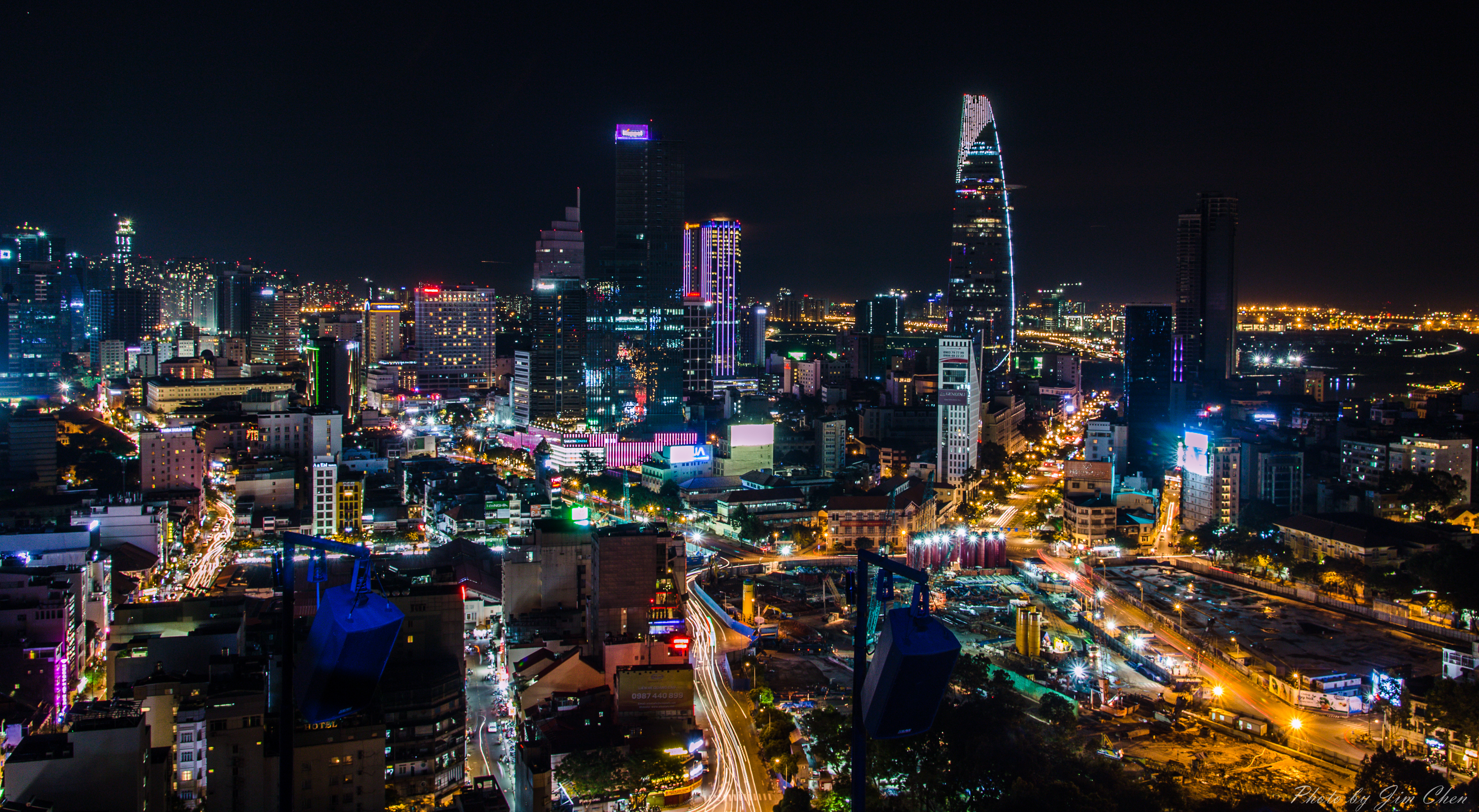
Teams spent the majority of the third leg in downtown Ho Chi Minh City.

- Episode 3: "Here Fishy, Fishy, Fishy" (May 1, 2019)
- Prize: A trip for two to Bimini, Bahamas (awarded to Becca & Floyd)

Locations

- Ban Xiengkeo (Prince Phetsarath's Palace)
- Luang Prabang → Ho Chi Minh City, Vietnam
- Ho Chi Minh City (House of Vietnamese Medicine)
- Ho Chi Minh City (Thanh Đa Restaurant or The CREATV Company Film Studio)
- Ho Chi Minh City (Kingdom Karaoke)
- Ho Chi Minh City (Hồ Thị Kỷ Flower Market)

Episode summary

- At the start of this leg, teams were instructed to use a mobile app to book a flight to Ho Chi Minh City, Vietnam. Once there, teams had to find a doctor at the House of Vietnamese Medicine, who gave them a packet of herbal remedies, which contained their next clue.
- This leg's Detour was a choice between Reel It In or Light It Up. In Reel It In, teams had to travel to Thanh Đa Restaurant and catch eight prawns from the pool inside the restaurant using fishing poles in order to receive their next clue. In Light It Up, teams had to travel to The CREATV Company film studio and learn a dance. When ready, they donned a glowsuit covered with electroluminescent wire and had to dance in sync alongside local dancers and Asia's Got Talent contestants 218 Dance Crew in order to receive their next clue.
- In this leg's Roadblock, one team member had to learn the Vietnamese lyrics of Trúc Nhân's song "Thật Bất Ngờ" and then perform it karaoke-style in front of an audience. Once racers sang the lyrics correctly, they received their next clue, which directed them to the Pit Stop: Hồ Thị Kỷ Flower Market.

Additional note

- This was a non-elimination leg.

=== Leg 4 (Vietnam) ===
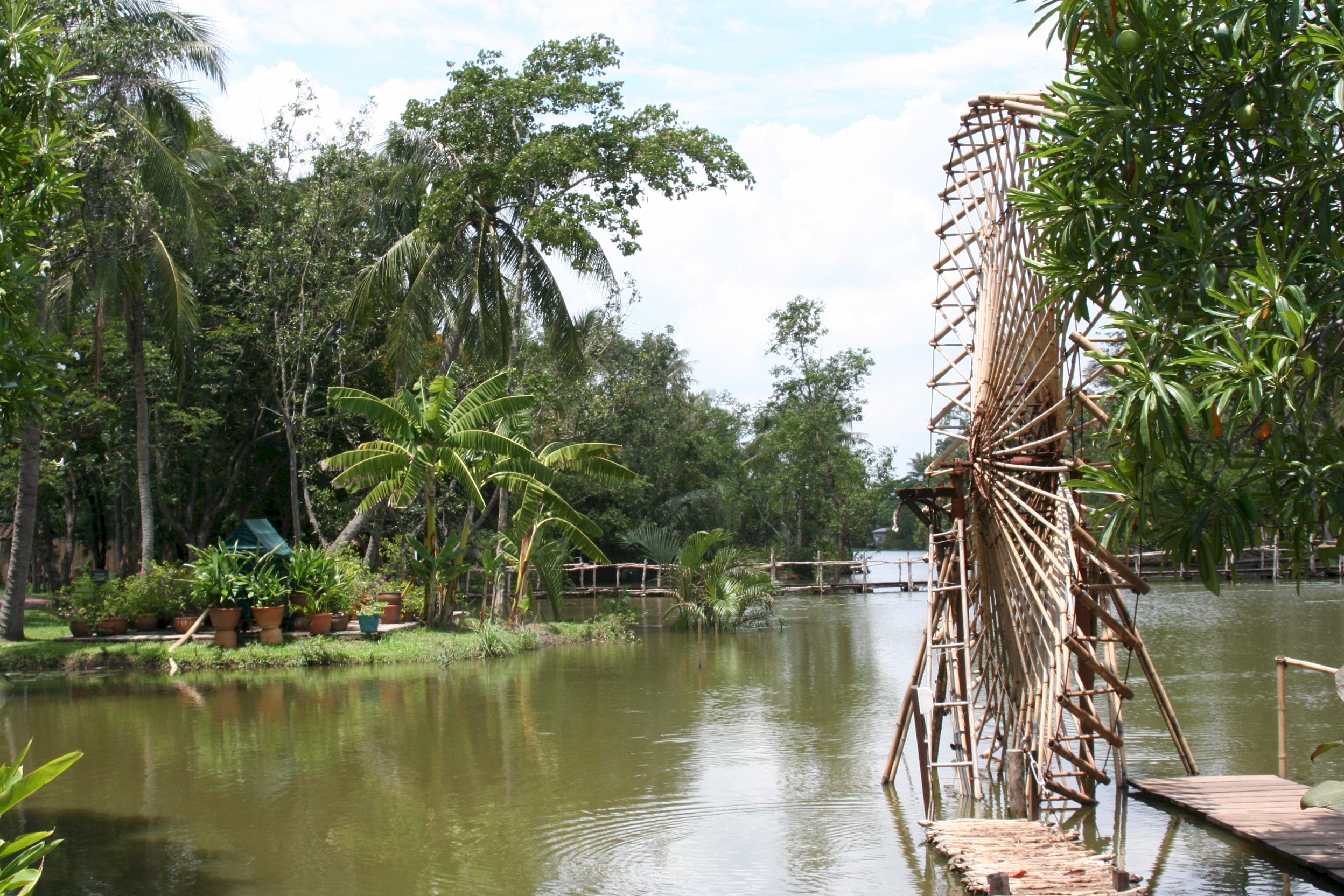
One of the Detour options involved assembling a bamboo water wheel at the Bình Quới Village.

- Episode 4: "I Took Out a Polar Bear" (May 8, 2019)
- Prize: A trip for two to Punta Cana, Dominican Republic (awarded to Colin & Christie)
- Eliminated: Corinne & Eliza

Locations

- Ho Chi Minh City (Hồ Thị Kỷ Flower Market)
- Ho Chi Minh City (SnowTown Saigon)
- Ho Chi Minh City (College Transportation Central)
- Ho Chi Minh City (Bình Quới Village)
- Ho Chi Minh City (Tầm Vu Park) (Unaired)

Episode summary

- At the start of this leg, teams had to travel to SnowTown Saigon and ride a sled down an indoor slope to a person dressed as a polar bear, who gave them their next clue directing them to College Transportation Central.
- For their Speed Bump, Chris & Bret had to fill a cooler with snowballs in simulated snowstorm conditions and then deliver the cooler to College Transportation Central before they could continue racing.
- In this leg's Roadblock, one team member had to pass a Vietnamese driving test by driving a scooter through a figure-eight and over a series of speed bumps in order to receive their next clue.
- After the Roadblock, teams had to travel to Bình Quới Village and find their next clue.
- This leg's Detour was a choice between Irritation or Irrigation. In Irritation, teams had to paddle a basket boat 200 yards (180 m) while avoiding fishermen on boats and moving their boat over bridges in order to pick up a basket of five fish. They then had to paddle back to the start and exchange the fish and the basket for their next clue. In Irrigation, teams had to assemble a bamboo water wheel and then use the water wheel to fill a jar with water in order to receive their next clue.
- After the Detour, teams had to travel by bus and then on foot to the Pit Stop: Tầm Vu Park, adjacent to the Thanh Đa Canal.

Additional note

- At Tầm Vu Park, teams encountered a Head-to-Head, which was unaired. Two teams had to compete against each other in a badminton match. The team that won the Head-to-Head could check in at the nearby Pit Stop, while the team that lost had to wait for the next team. The team that lost the final Head-to-Head was eliminated.

=== Leg 5 (Vietnam → United Arab Emirates) ===
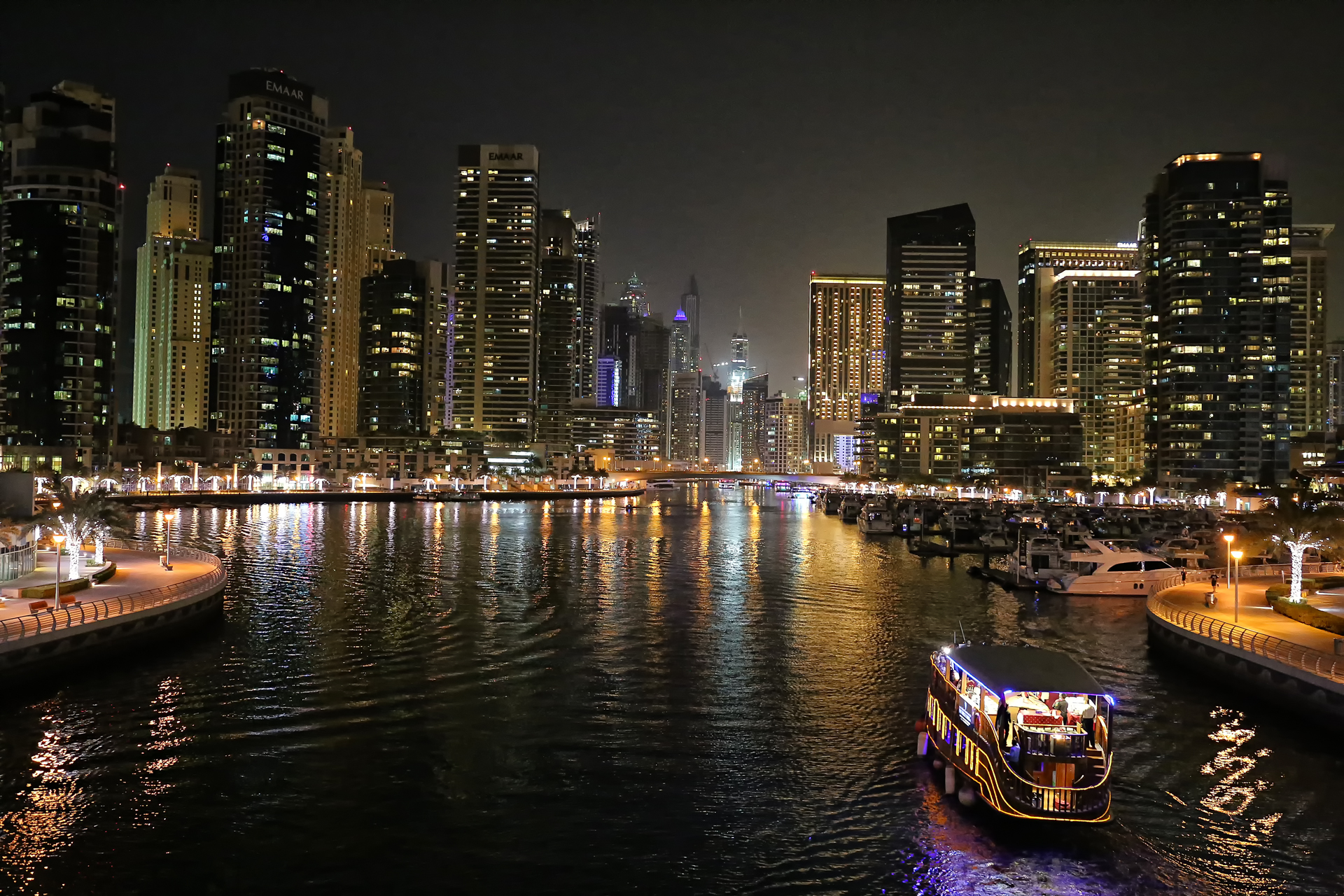
At the end of the leg in Dubai, teams zip-lined to the Dubai Marina, which served as the fifth Pit Stop.

- Episode 5: "I'm a Bird, I'm a Plane, I'm on The Amazing Race" (May 22, 2019)
- Prize: US$5,000 each (awarded to Becca & Floyd)

Locations

- Ho Chi Minh City (Tầm Vu Park)
- Ho Chi Minh City → Dubai, United Arab Emirates
- Al Faqa (Al Faqa Desert)
- Dubai (Dubai Frame)
- Dubai (Burj Khalifa – Mission 828 or Dubai Garden Glow – Dinosaur Park)
- Dubai (Soho Garden)
- Dubai (Amwaj Tower 4)
- Dubai (Dubai Marina)

Episode summary

- At the start of this leg, teams were instructed to fly to Dubai in the United Arab Emirates. Once there, teams had to travel to a "supercar tailgate party". After sampling tea and dates, teams found their next clue inside a supercar, which directed them to the Dubai Frame.
- This leg's Detour was a choice between Fall or Find. In Fall, teams had to travel to the Burj Khalifa and choose a jumpmaster, who took them up the building. There, teams had to don a virtual reality headset and use the controls to find a signal interceptor, climb to the top of a simulated spire, intercept a satellite, and parachute to the base of the building. After the jump, both team members had to correctly answer a series of test questions in order to receive their next clue. If they answered any questions incorrectly, they had to attempt the task again. In Find, teams had to travel to Dubai Garden Glow and don Tyrannosaurus rex costumes. They then had to search Dinosaur Park for five glowing colored dinosaur eggs and place them in a nest in order to receive their next clue.
- After the Detour, teams found their next clue at the Soho Garden.
- In this leg's Roadblock, one team member had to enter a silent rave and find a party-goer dancing to the same music as the DJ (a dance remix of The Amazing Race theme), using only their sight, in order to receive their next clue.
- After the Roadblock, teams had to go to the top of Amwaj Tower 4 and ride the world's longest urban zipline to the Pit Stop: the Dubai Marina.

Additional note

- This was a non-elimination leg.

=== Leg 6 (United Arab Emirates → Uganda) ===
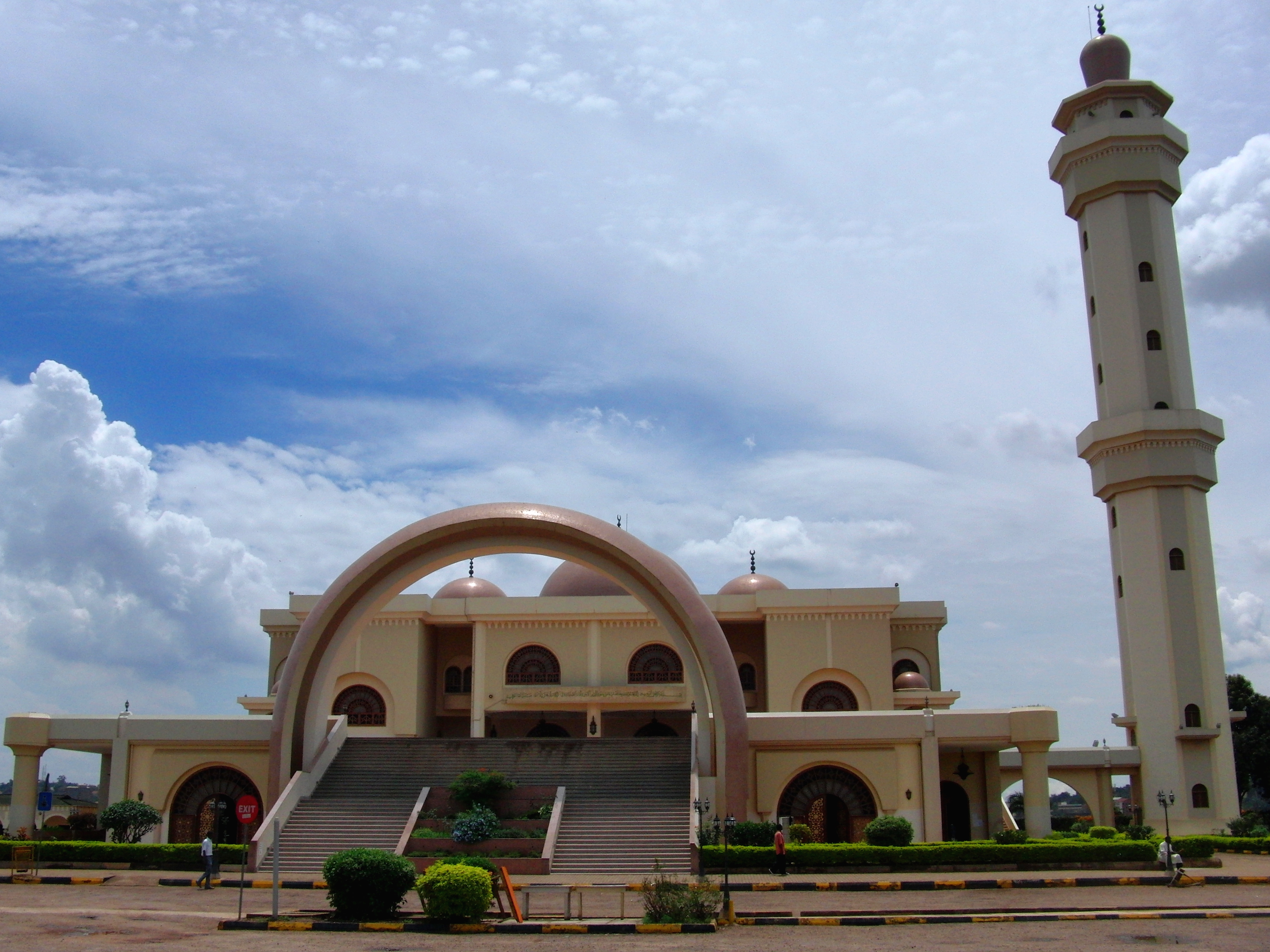
After arriving in Kampala, teams had to climb the minaret of the Uganda National Mosque.

- Episode 6: "Who Wants a Rolex?" (May 22, 2019)
- Prize: A trip for two to Singapore (awarded to Tyler & Korey)
- Eliminated: Janelle & Britney

Locations

- Dubai (Dubai Marina)
- Dubai → Kampala, Uganda
- Kampala (Uganda National Mosque)
- Kampala (Owino Market – Soweto Restaurant)
- Kampala (Lake Victoria – Ggaba Landing Site)
- Kampala (Jahazi Pier)

Episode summary

- At the start of this leg, teams were instructed to fly to Kampala, Uganda. Once there, teams had to travel to the Uganda National Mosque and don customary clothing. Teams had to climb to the top of the mosque's minaret, counting the steps along the way. If they had the correct number, they received their next clue directing them to Soweto Restaurant in Owino Market.
- For their Speed Bump, Rachel & Elissa had to hand-wash clothes and then hang them to dry before they could continue racing.
- In this leg's Roadblock, one team member had to find a vendor, who gave them a shopping list. They then had to purchase the ingredients on the list and properly prepare a rolex in order to receive their next clue.
- After the Roadblock, teams had to travel to Ggaba Landing Site along Lake Victoria and find the village boat builders in order to receive their next clue.
- This leg's Detour was a choice between Salty Roll or Move the Pole. In Salty Roll, teams had to bring a wheelbarrow of Nile perch to a workstation. They then had to properly salt and roll the fish skin and had to wash, gut, and salt the meat in order to receive their next clue. In Move the Pole, teams had to load firewood from a canoe onto a bicycle and deliver the wood to a market. There, teams had to stack the wood to match a sample pile in order to receive their next clue.
- In this season's only aired Head-to-Head, one member from each competing team had to solve a puzzle that consisted of four stacks of Ngoma drums. Team members had to move one drum at a time until each stack consisted of drums of the same color and grab an ox tail in order to win the Head-to-Head. The team that won the Head-to-Head could check in at the nearby Pit Stop, while the team that lost had to wait for the next team. The team that lost the final Head-to-Head was eliminated.

Additional note

- Legs 5 and 6 aired back-to-back.

=== Leg 7 (Uganda → Switzerland) ===
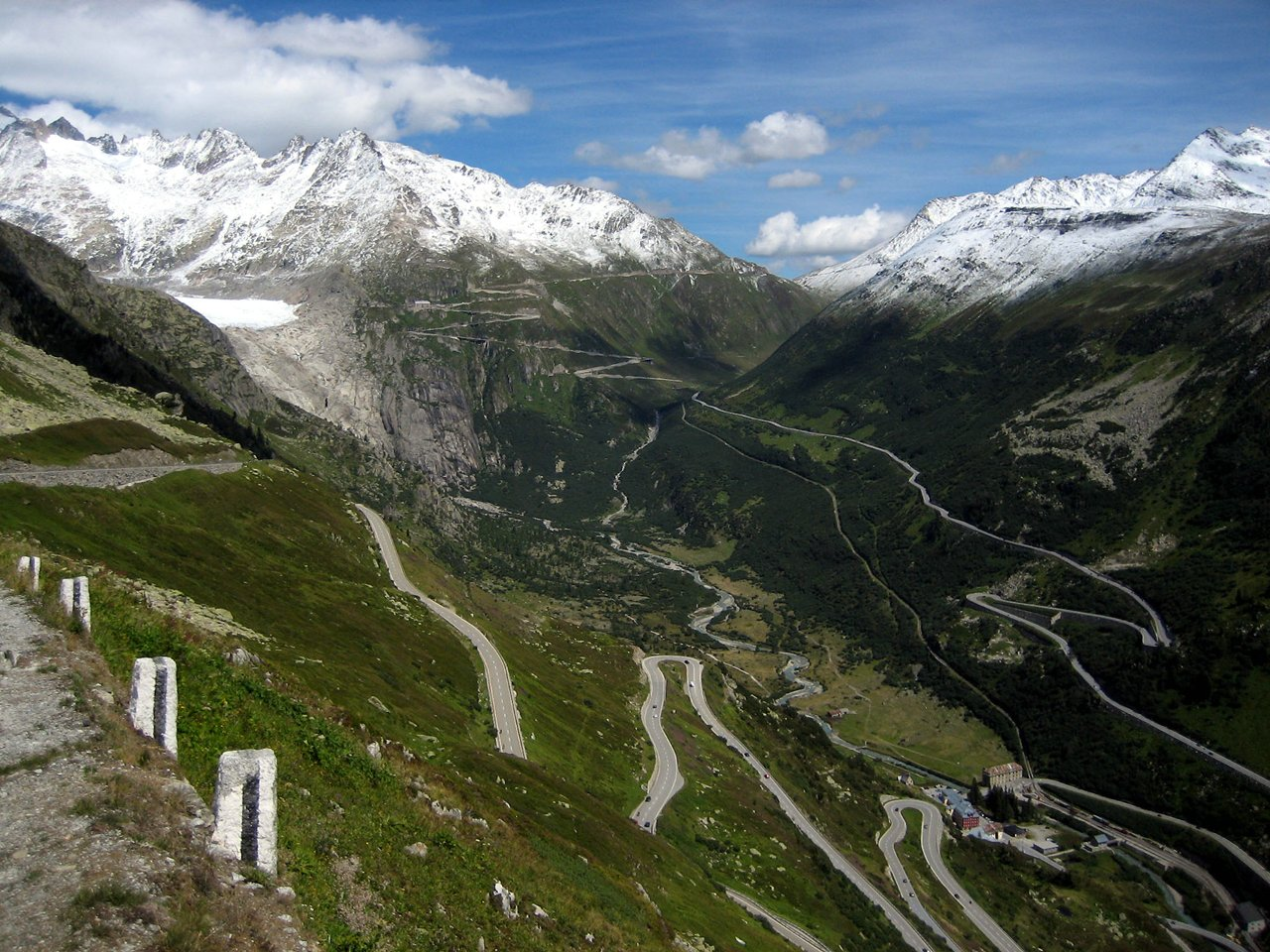
The Grimsel Pass in the Swiss Alps served as the backdrop for this leg.

- Episode 7: "Living Fearlessly" (May 29, 2019)
- Prize: A spa day during the Pit Stop (awarded to Tyler & Korey)

Locations

- Kampala (Jahazi Pier)
- Kampala (Equity Agency)
- Kampala → Zürich, Switzerland
- Zürich → Grindelwald
- Grindelwald (Gletscherschlucht Glacier Gorge)
- Grindelwald (Gletscherschlucht Glacier Gorge) → Guttannen (Grimsel Pass)
- Guttannen (Gelmerbahn & Gelmersee or Grimsel Canyon)
- Meiringen (Michaelskirche)

Episode summary

- At the start of this leg, teams were instructed to fly to Zürich, Switzerland, with teams required to book their flight at Equity Agency, and then travel by train to Grindelwald. Once there, teams had to travel on foot to the Gletscherschlucht Glacier Gorge.
- In this leg's Roadblock, one team member was harnessed to a canyon swing, and then performed a 400-foot (120 m) free-fall into the Gletscherschlucht. After the swing, they had to search the gorge for their next clue.
- After the Roadblock, teams had to travel by helicopter to the Grimsel Pass, where they found their next clue.
- This leg's Detour was a choice between Water Power or Water Down. In Water Power, teams had to ride the Gelmerbahn. During the ride, teams had to study eight signs that identified reservoirs and the amount of water that each held. When their ride ended, teams had to match the eight reservoirs to their water capacities on a technical map in order to receive their next clue. If their map was incorrect, they had to ride the Gelmerbahn again. In Water Down, teams had to go canyoneering in the Grimsel Canyon. They had to rappel 150 feet (46 m) down a canyon, jump from a ledge into a glacial river, and then jump to grab their next clue hanging from a rope. After retrieving their clue, team members had to ride a zipline and then drop down into a river before hiking out of the canyon.
- After the Detour, teams had to drive to the Pit Stop: Michaelskirche in Meiringen.

Additional note

- This was a non-elimination leg.

=== Leg 8 (Switzerland) ===
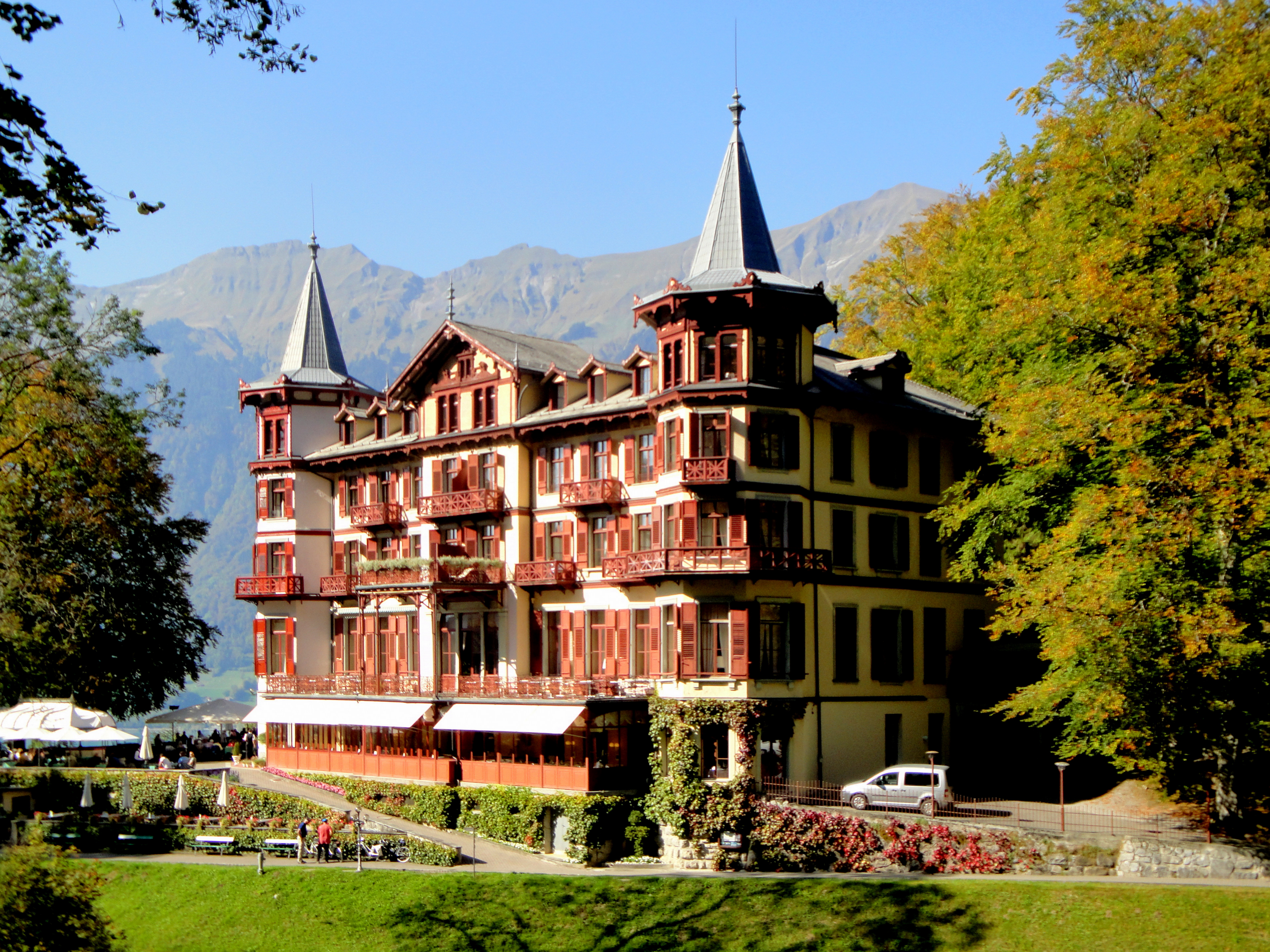
After the Roadblock, teams traveled by boat across Lake Brienz to the Grand Hotel Giessbach in Brienz, the eighth Pit Stop.

- Episode 8: "You're the Apple in My Eye" (June 5, 2019)
- Prize: A seven-night river cruise for two to Vietnam and Cambodia (awarded to Tyler & Korey)
- Eliminated: Rachel & Elissa

Locations

- Meiringen (Michaelskirche)
- Hofstetten bei Brienz (Ballenberg Community Hall)
- Hofstetten bei Brienz (Ballenberg Open Air Museum)
- Schwanden bei Brienz (Oberschwanden)
- Brienz (Grand Hotel Giessbach)

Episode summary

- At the start of this leg, teams drove to the Ballenberg Community Hall, where Phil Keoghan informed them that they would be voting for two teams to be U-Turned on this leg. The vote was an open vote and the voting order was determined by a random draw. After the vote, teams found their next clue outside of the community hall.
- For their Speed Bump, Nicole & Victor had to fold the 26 Swiss canton flags in the Ballenberg Community Hall and place them in a basket before they could continue racing.
- This leg's Detour was a choice between Haymaking or Cow Dressing. In Haymaking, one team member had to use a scythe to cut a lane of grass while their partner raked it. They then had to properly stack the grass so that it could dry into hay in order to receive their next clue. In Cow Dressing, teams had to use provided materials to re-create a floral headdress and place it on a cow's head. They then had to lead the cow to a festival in order to receive their next clue.
- After the Detour, teams drove to Oberschwanden, which had their next clue.
- In this leg's Roadblock, one team member had to use a crossbow to shoot an apple off a scarecrow's head in order to receive their next clue. If team members struck the scarecrow, they had to reassemble it before taking another shot.
- After the Roadblock, teams had to drive to Lake Brienz. There, they had to pilot a motorboat across the lake to a marked pier. After disembarking, they could travel either by foot or by funicular to the Pit Stop: the Grand Hotel Giessbach.

Additional notes

- Teams encountered a Live Double U-Turn Vote. The teams' votes, as well as the voting order, were as follows:

U-Turn Vote results
Team	Vote
Rachel & Elissa	Colin & Christie
Nicole & Victor	Leo & Jamal
Colin & Christie	Rachel & Elissa
Leo & Jamal	Colin & Christie
Becca & Floyd	Colin & Christie
Tyler & Korey	Nicole & Victor
Chris & Bret	Rachel & Elissa

- The Detour options on the teams' clues were listed as Haymaking and Cow Dressing; however, the graphics on the show listed the Detour options as Make Hay and Cow Festival.

=== Leg 9 (Switzerland → Croatia) ===
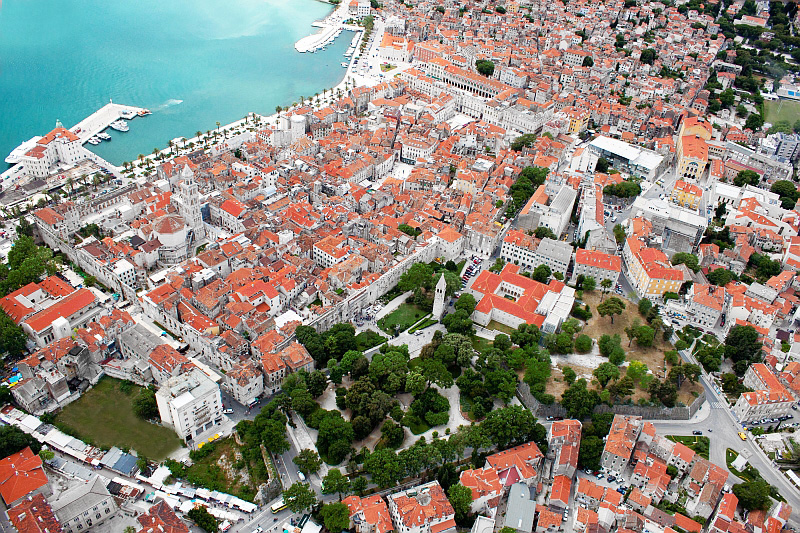
In the old town of Split, teams visited the historic Diocletian's Palace for the Roadblock before rowing across the Port of Split to the Pit Stop.

- Episode 9: "Let's Split!" (June 12, 2019)
- Prize: A trip for two to Riviera Maya, Mexico (awarded to Tyler & Korey)
- Eliminated: Chris & Bret

Locations

- Meiringen (Michaelskirche)
- Meiringen → Zürich
- Zürich → Split, Croatia
- Split (Bačvice Beach – Caffe Bar Žbirac)
- Split (Marjan Cave Church)
- Split (Kašjuni Beach)
- Split (Diocletian's Palace)
- Split (Matejuška Pier)

Episode summary

- At the start of this leg, teams were instructed to travel by train to Zürich and then fly to Split, Croatia. Once there, teams had to travel to Bačvice Beach, where each team member had to carry three glasses of punch from the Caffe Bar Žbirac to a group of sunbathers, who gave the teams a Travelocity Roaming Gnome that they had to keep with them for the remainder of the leg. After returning the trays to the bartender, teams received their next clue, which directed them to travel to the Marjan Cave Church and use a pulley system to deliver a loaf of bread to a monk in exchange for their next clue.
- This leg's Detour was a choice between Poetry in Motion or Washed in from the Ocean. In Poetry in Motion, teams had to memorize a poem while riding a large flying tube being towed by a speedboat. After returning to shore, teams had to correctly recite the poem in order to receive their next clue. In Washed in from the Ocean, teams had to go snorkeling and use a metal detector to search the Adriatic Sea for a goblet and five coins, which they could exchange for their next clue after returning to shore. Though some teams did initially try Washed in from the Ocean, they all switched to Poetry in Motion.
- After the Detour, teams found their next clue at Diocletian's Palace.
- In this leg's Roadblock, one team member had to enter a Roman Senator's room and watch a troop of eighteen soldiers march in formation. After the soldiers covered themselves with shields, team members had to correctly identify the five soldiers wearing red ribbons around their helmets in order to receive their next clue.
- After the Roadblock, teams had to board a dinghy and row themselves to the Pit Stop: Matejuška Pier.

Additional note

- Bačvice Beach was misidentified on the show's graphics as Kašjuni Beach, as Leo & Jamal instructed their taxi driver to take them to the Caffe Žbirac on Bačvice Beach, and Becca also instructed her taxi driver to take them to Bačvice Beach.

=== Leg 10 (Croatia → Netherlands) ===
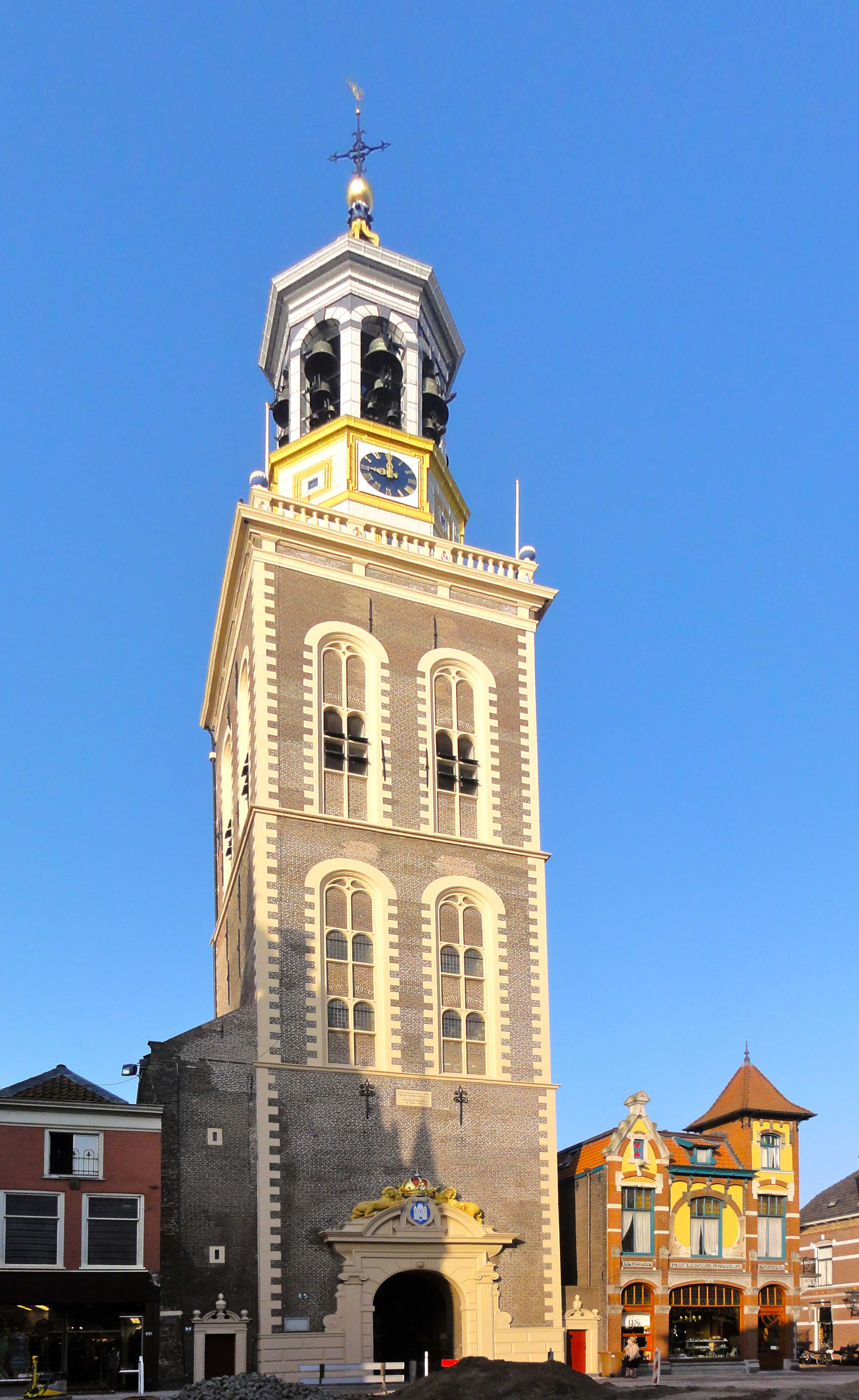
One Detour option in Kampen required that teams hoist a cow up the Nieuwe Toren.

- Episode 10: "Chugga Chugga Choo Choo!" (June 19, 2019)
- Prize: US$7,500 each (awarded to Colin & Christie)
- Eliminated: Becca & Floyd

Locations

- Split (Matejuška Pier)
- Split (RIVA Travel)
- Split → Amsterdam, Netherlands
- Amsterdam → Kampen
- Kampen (Kampen Railway Station → Jachthaven)
- Kampen (Erf 34 & Nieuwe Toren or Erf 29 & Kampen Market)
- Kampen (IJsselkade)
- Kampen (Kampen Railway Station)
- Giethoorn (Bovenwijde Lake Island)

Episode summary

- At the start of this leg, teams were instructed to fly to Amsterdam, Netherlands, with teams required to book their flight at RIVA Travel, and then travel by train to Kampen. Outside the Kampen railway station, teams had to search a bicycle parking lot for a marked tandem bicycle, which they had to ride to the Jachthaven in order to find their next clue.
- This leg's Detour was a choice between High or Dry. In High, teams had to ride their tandem bicycles to a farm and load a "Kamper cow" onto a trailer behind a tractor. They then had to follow the tractor on their bicycles to the Nieuwe Toren and hoist the cow to the top of the tower within 40 seconds. If they could raise the cow within the time limit, one team member had to climb to the top of the bell tower and receive their next clue. In Dry, teams had to bike to a farm, where both team members had to pole vault across an irrigation ditch "the Dutch way". They then had to bring two cheese orbs and a dozen eggs back across the ditch and transport them to the Kampen Market intact in order to receive their next clue.
- After the Detour, teams had to travel by bicycle to the IJsselkade, where they found their next clue. Teams then had to return their bicycles to the railway station and drive themselves to Giethoorn. There, team had to board a boat and navigate the canals of Giethoorn in order to find two marked boats and create a "boat train". Teams then had to navigate their boats to the Pit Stop at the island on Bovenwijde Lake.

Additional notes

- This leg featured a Double U-Turn. Leo & Jamal chose to use the U-Turn on Nicole & Victor, while Nicole & Victor chose to use the U-Turn on Becca & Floyd.
- Producer Bertram van Munster appeared as the greeter of the leg as he is from Giethoorn. While he can be seen from his backside with Phil on the episode, for unknown reasons, his face was never shown in the episode.

=== Leg 11 (Netherlands → England) ===
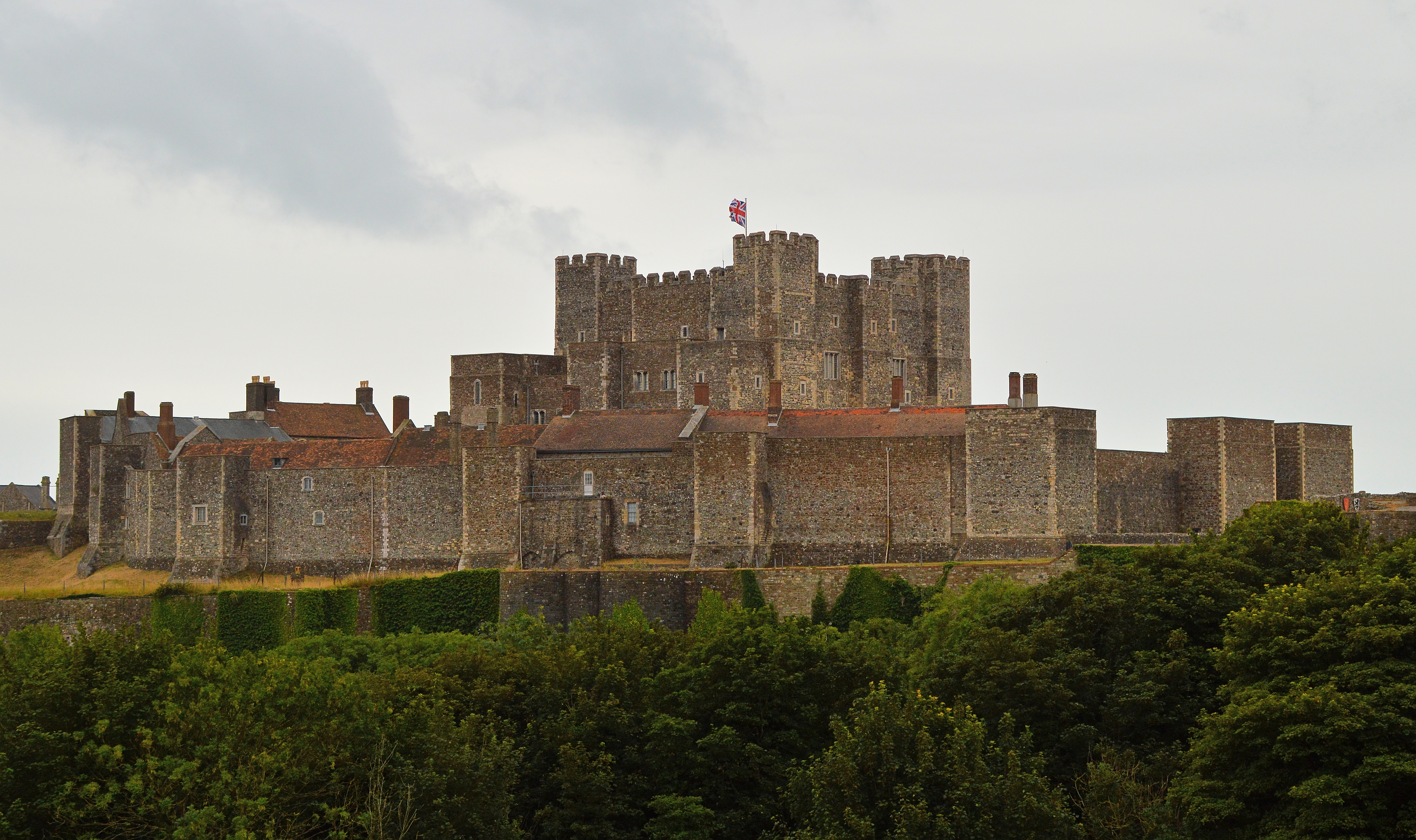
In England, teams visited Dover Castle, where one team member had to decipher a code much like the codebreakers of World War II did.

- Episode 11: "This One is For One Million Dollars" (June 26, 2019)
- Eliminated: Nicole & Victor

Locations

- Zwolle (De Koperen Hoogte)
- Amsterdam → London, England
- Charlwood (Gatwick Aviation Museum) → Dover (Dover Castle)
- Dover (Dover Castle) → London (Falcon London Heliport)
- London (Masthouse Terrace Pier → Savoy Pier)
- London (Piccadilly Circus)
- London (Kensington Road – Cabmen's Shelter or Hyde Park – The Serpentine)
- London (Camden Market)

Episode summary

- At the start of this leg, teams were instructed to fly to London, England. Once there, teams had to travel to the Gatwick Aviation Museum and board a helicopter that took them over the Seven Sisters before landing near Dover Castle, where they found their next clue.
- In this leg's Roadblock, one team member had to decipher a World War II code by listening to a speech by Neville Chamberlain. Team members then had to type the decoded message on an Underwood portable typewriter and deliver it to a brigadier outside the castle's barracks. If they gave him the correct message – "The Dunkirk evacuation has begun. We will never surrender." – they received their next clue.
- After the Roadblock, teams had to return by helicopter to London. Once there, teams had to find their next clue at Masthouse Terrace Pier, which instructed them to travel by speedboat to Savoy Pier. After disembarking, teams had to go to Piccadilly Circus and find the golden queen, who gave them their next clue.
- This season's final Detour was a choice between Know or Row. In Know, teams had to ride a taxicab and memorize the fifteen streets and seven landmarks that their driver identified during the route. When teams returned to the cabmen's shelter, they had to correctly recite their route in order to receive their next clue. In Row, teams had to row a double scull through a 200-metre (660 ft) course on The Serpentine in under one minute in order to receive their next clue.
- After the Detour, teams traveled to Camden Market and found the Pit Stop, where Phil Keoghan surprised them with another clue. Teams had to search nearby shops for the marked items in a display and use those items to recreate the display before they could check in at the Pit Stop.

=== Leg 12 (England → United States) ===
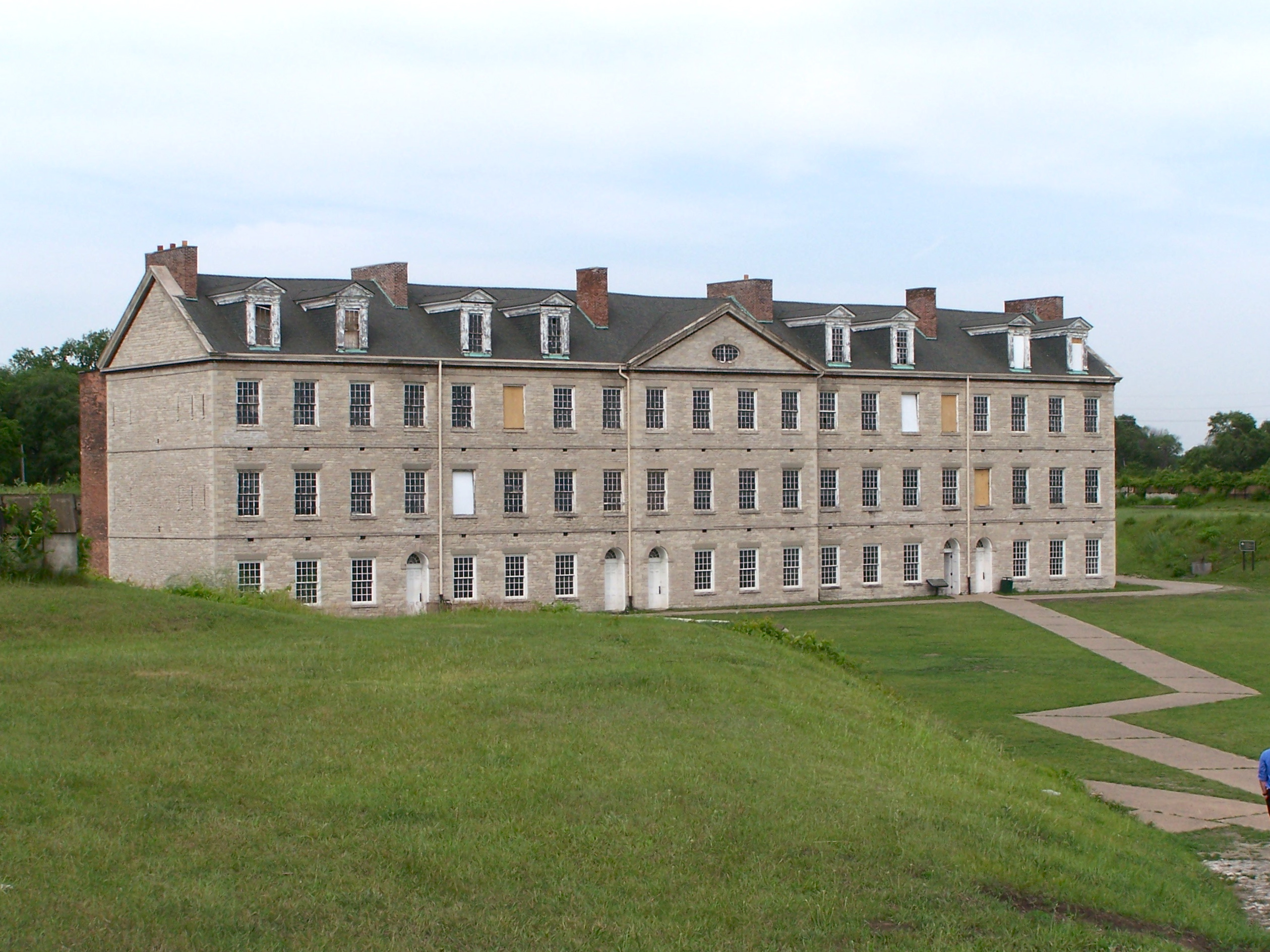
The historic Fort Wayne in Detroit, Michigan served as the finish line for The Amazing Race 31.

- Episode 11: "This One is For One Million Dollars" (June 26, 2019)
- Prize: US$1,000,000
- Winners: Colin & Christie
- Runners-up: Tyler & Korey
- Third place: Leo & Jamal

Locations

- London (Camden Market)
- London → Detroit, Michigan
- Detroit (The Spirit of Detroit)
- Detroit (Guardian Building)
- Hamtramck (Fowling Warehouse)
- Detroit (Heidelberg Project) (Unaired)
- Detroit (Third Man Records)
- Detroit (Hart Plaza)
- Detroit (Fort Wayne)

Episode summary

- At the start of this leg, teams were instructed to fly to Detroit, Michigan. Once there, teams found their next clue at The Spirit of Detroit.
- In this season's final Roadblock, one team member had to rappel face-first 500 feet (150 m) down the Guardian Building. On the way down, they had to look for a series of numbers that they needed to unlock a bank vault in the basement of the building in order to retrieve their next clue.
- After the Roadblock, teams had to travel to the Fowling Warehouse and play a game of fowling, which required each team member to throw a football and knock down bowling pins in order to receive their next clue.
- At Third Man Records, teams had to properly press five two-tone vinyl records using Amazing Race colors in order to receive their next clue, which directed them to Hart Plaza. There, teams had to search amongst a group of Rockin' 1000 musicians to find their next clue atop a drum. Teams then had to assemble a five-piece drum kit that precisely matched an example while the musicians played The White Stripes' single "Seven Nation Army" before receiving their final clue, which directed them to the finish line: Fort Wayne.

Additional notes

- After leaving the Fowling Warehouse, teams had to travel to the Heidelberg Project and search through a field of Amazing Race clue boxes scattered throughout the outdoor art installation for one which contained their next clue. This task was unaired.
- Legs 11 and 12 aired back-to-back as a special two-hour episode.

== Production ==
=== Development and filming ===
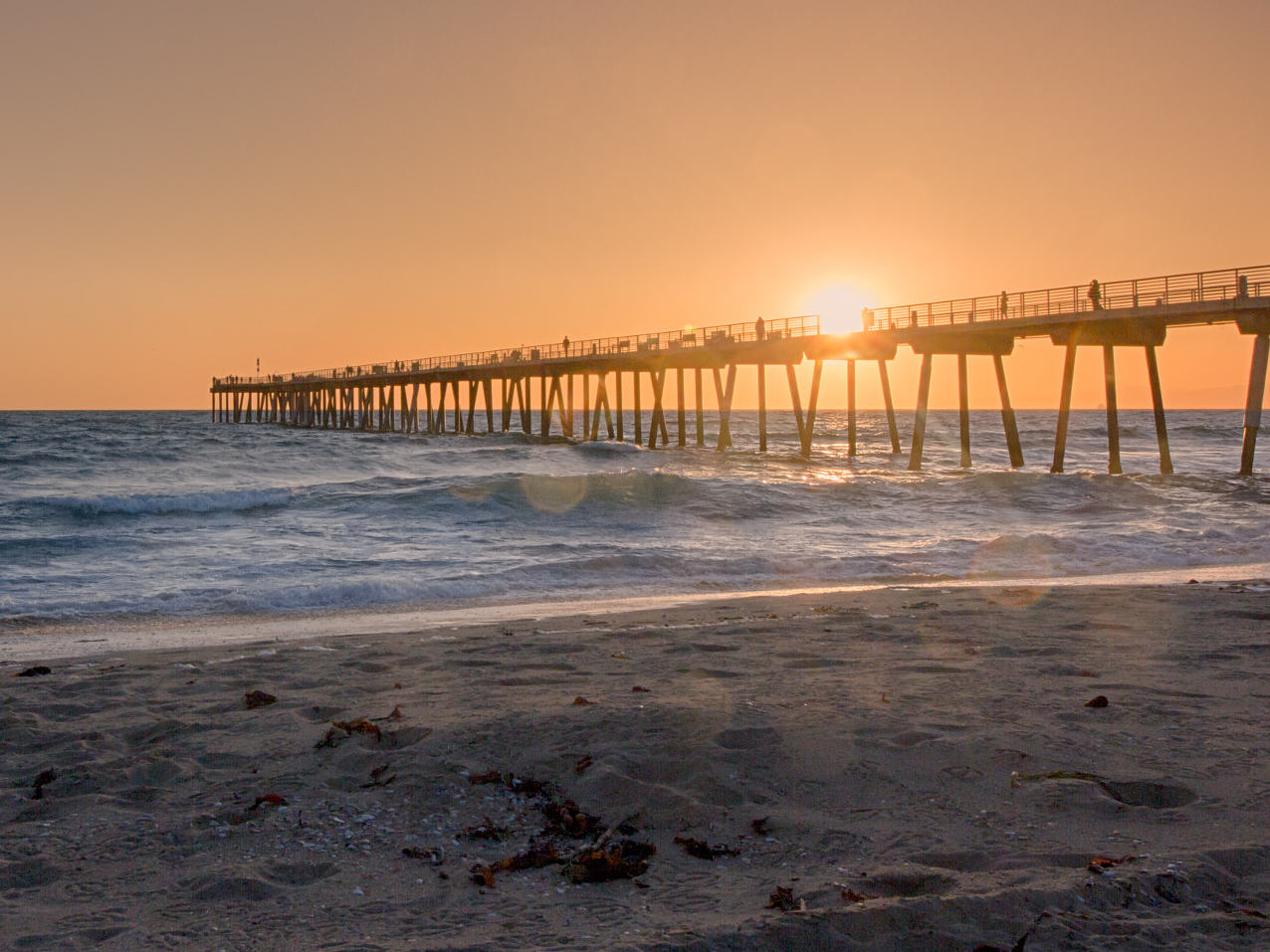
The 31st season of The Amazing Race began on June 10, 2018, at the Hermosa Beach Pier and nearby beach in Hermosa Beach, California.

On June 10, 2018, Phil Keoghan announced on the show's social media accounts that the season had begun filming and that the teams would be composed of contestants from CBS's reality competition programs. On June 30, teams were spotted at the Nieuwe Toren in Kampen, Netherlands. On July 3, filming ended in Detroit, which featured a performance of The White Stripes' single "Seven Nation Army" that was originally planned to be set in Belle Isle Park. However, the permit was denied as the Michigan Department of Natural Resources had not been informed about the large gathering of musicians needed for filming.

The Amazing Race 31 traveled over 25,000 miles across four continents and 10 countries, including first-time visits for the American edition to Uganda and Laos. Laos was previously visited on the fourth season of The Amazing Race Vietnam.

The Head-to-Head returned this season after it was introduced in the previous season. This season is also the first to utilize the U-Turn Vote, which has been previously utilized by the Israeli, Chinese, Australian, and Filipino versions of The Amazing Race.

=== Casting ===
On May 4, 2018, a TMZ article reported that former Big Brother HouseGuests had been asked to compete on the upcoming season of The Amazing Race. Later that day, Andy Dehnart posted that former Amazing Race contestants had also been contacted for the same season. Martin Holmes from Inside Survivor then posted that former Survivor contestants were also in the mix.

- Eric Sanchez and Jeremy Ryan from season 9 were contacted and agreed to participate, but were ultimately cut when the show decided to include Big Brother and Survivor teams.
- Josh Canfield and Reed Kelly from Survivor: San Juan del Sur were contacted, but ultimately didn't make the final cast.
- Justin and Diana Scheman (née Bishop) from season 27 were originally selected, but declined the invitation due to Diana being pregnant.
- Keith and Wes Nale from Survivor: San Juan del Sur were contacted, but ultimately didn't make the final cast.
- Kym Perfetto and Alli Forsythe from season 25 were originally considered, but ultimately cut.
- The Linz family from season 8 were originally considered, but ultimately cut.
- Mark Jansen and Elena Davies from Big Brother 19 were contacted to compete and agreed to participate, but were cut a few days before filming.
- Rob Cesternino from Survivor: The Amazon and Survivor: All-Stars and Stephen Fishbach from Survivor: Tocantins and Survivor: Cambodia were contacted and expressed interest, but declined due to Fishbach's wedding overlapping with filming.
- Will Kirby and Mike "Boogie" Malin, the winners of Big Brother 2 and Big Brother: All-Stars, respectively, were asked to compete, but Kirby declined.

== Release ==
=== Broadcast ===
In the lead-in to the 2018-19 television programming season, CBS had scheduled The Amazing Race 31 to begin airing on May 22, 2019. However, in early April 2019, CBS opted to bring the premiere forward to April 17, 2019, slotting the show in Wednesdays after Survivor and replacing the low-rated Million Dollar Mile.

== Reception ==
=== Critical response ===
The Amazing Race 31 received mostly positive reviews. Andy Dehnart of reality blurred called this season dull, writing that "TAR can still deliver beautiful cinematography and entertaining moments, like Rupert talking to an elephant, but the structure of the legs constantly undercuts any actual racing by evening up the teams." Jodi Walker of Entertainment Weekly wrote that "more reality TV competition cultures in the mix made for a little more drama than usual." The "Purple Rock Podcast" praised the cast, strong racing, and overall story saying that "this experiment paid off accordingly". In 2022, Rhenn Taguiam of Game Rant ranked this season as the second-best season. In 2024, Taguiam's ranking was updated with this season remaining as the second-best season.

Critics were also positive towards the growth of Colin & Christie compared to their previous appearance. Tamara Grant of CheatSheat called it "a true redemption arc because of their behavior on Season 5." Dalton Ross of Entertainment Weekly called it the "most radical reality show transformation ever".

=== Ratings ===
U.S. Nielsen ratings

Viewership and ratings per episode of The Amazing Race 31
No.	Title	Air date	Rating/share (18–49)	Viewers (millions)	DVR (18–49)	DVR viewers (millions)	Total (18–49)	Total viewers (millions)	Ref.
1	"You're in Our Race Now"	April 17, 2019	1.2/6	5.74	0.6	1.95	1.8	7.69	
2	"Knock the Newbie Out of Us"	April 24, 2019	1.0/5	4.65	0.6	2.13	1.6	6.78	
3	"Here Fishy, Fishy, Fishy"	May 1, 2019	0.9/4	4.50	0.6	2.06	1.5	6.57	
4	"I Took Out A Polar Bear"	May 8, 2019	0.8/4	4.44	0.6	1.98	1.4	6.41	
5	"I'm a Bird, I'm a Plane, I'm on The Amazing Race"	May 22, 2019	0.9/5	4.24	0.4	1.84	1.3	6.08	
6	"Who Wants a Rolex?"	May 22, 2019	0.7/4	3.70	0.5	2.15	1.2	5.85	
7	"Living Fearlessly"	May 29, 2019	0.8/4	4.74	0.5	1.78	1.3	6.52	
8	"You're the Apple in My Eye"	June 5, 2019	0.9/5	4.67	0.4	1.54	1.3	6.21	
9	"Let's Split!"	June 12, 2019	0.8/4	4.66	0.5	1.83	1.3	6.49	
10	"Chugga Chugga Choo Choo!"	June 19, 2019	0.8/5	4.75	0.5	1.75	1.3	6.49	
11	"This One is For One Million Dollars"	June 26, 2019	0.7/4	3.82	0.6	2.21	1.3	6.03	

Canadian ratings

Canadian broadcaster CTV also aired The Amazing Race on Wednesdays.

Canadian DVR ratings are included in Numeris's count.

No.	Air date	Episode	Viewers (millions)	Rank (Week)	Ref
1	April 17, 2019	"You're in Our Race Now"	1.22	15	
2	April 24, 2019	"Knock the Newbie Out of Us"	1.48	11	
3	May 1, 2019	"Here Fishy, Fishy, Fishy"	1.31	17	
4	May 8, 2019	"I Took Out A Polar Bear"	1.38	16	
5	May 22, 2019	"I'm a Bird, I'm a Plane, I'm on The Amazing Race"	1.44	4	
6	May 22, 2019	"Who Wants a Rolex?"	1.44	4	
7	May 29, 2019	"Living Fearlessly"	1.62	3	
8	June 5, 2019	"You're the Apple in My Eye"	1.48	4	
9	June 12, 2019	"Let's Split!"	1.60	8	
10	June 19, 2019	"Chugga Chugga Choo Choo!"	1.62	1	
11	June 26, 2019	"This One is For One Million Dollars"	1.51	1	

== Works cited ==
- Castro, Adam-Troy (2006). My Ox Is Broken!. BenBella Books. ISBN 978-1-932100-91-4.
