= Wat Sen =

Buddhist temple (wat) in Luang Phrabang, Laos

Coordinates: 19.8956°N 102.1418°E

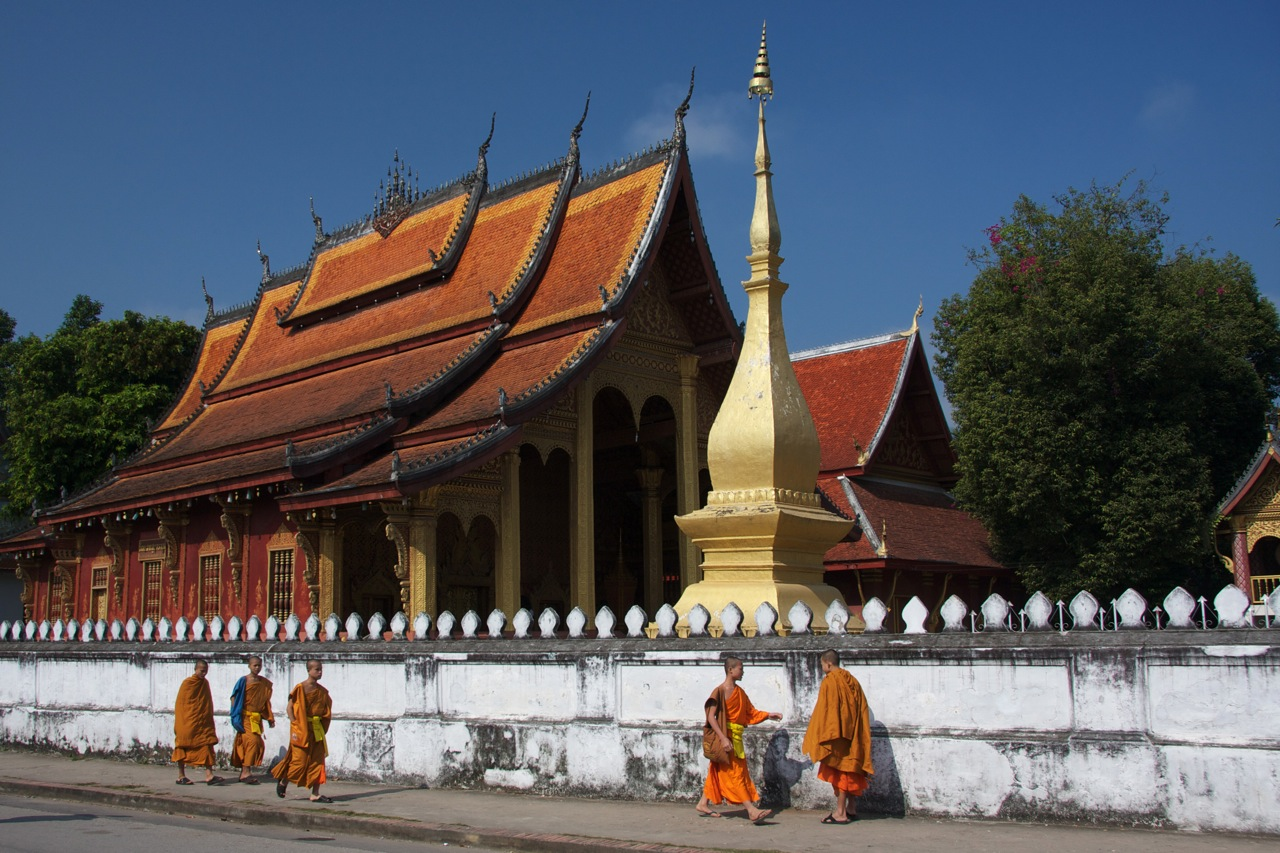
Wat Sen, Luang Prabang

Wat Sen (Lao: ວັດແສນ) also known as Wat Sene Souk Haram (ວັດແສນສຸກຂາຣາມ) is a Buddhist temple (wat), located in Luang Phrabang, Laos. It is one of several dozen temples in the ancient capital.

== History ==
It was built in 1718 by King Kitsarath with 100,000 stones from the Mekong river. It literally means "Temple of 100,000 treasures". It was restored in 1957 commemorating the Buddha's birth 2500 years earlier.

== See also ==
- Wat Xieng Thong
- Royal Palace, Luang Prabang
