= Xiengkeo Palace =

Building in Laos

Coordinates: 19.8690°N 102.1061°E

Grand Luang Prabang Hotel Logo

Xiengkeo Palace was the former royal residence of the Lao Prime minister, Prince Phetsarath Ratanavongsa in Luang Prabang, French Laos, now Laos. The buildings were French colonial in style. After the communist revolution, it was converted into a hotel and renamed the Grand Luang Prabang hotel.
