= Fowling (sport) =

Hybrid game of American football and bowling

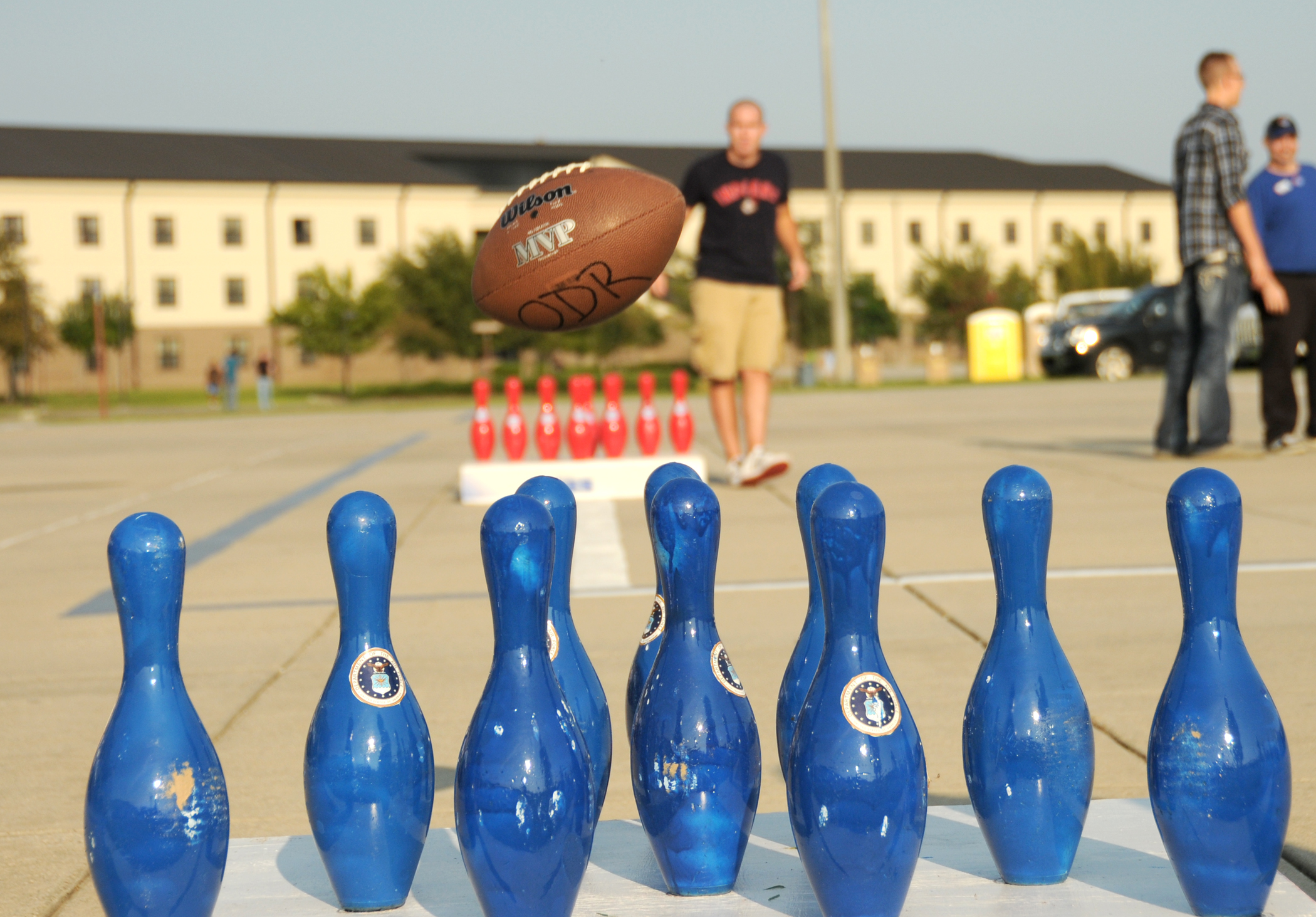
A game of fowling

Fowling (/ˈfoʊlɪŋ/) is a hybrid game that combines the equipment of American football and bowling into one sport with a similar layout as horseshoes and cornhole. Most commonly played as a pastime in a tailgate or campground setting across the United States, Fowling was founded in 2001 by Chris Hutt. According to an interview with Hutt, the sport originated at an Indianapolis 500 parking lot when a discarded football accidentally knocked over bowling pins and inspired the idea of throwing footballs at the pins as a competitive game.

The object of Fowling is for teams to be the first to knock down all opponent's pins by throwing a full-size regulation football at 10 bowling pins positioned in a traditional bowling layout.

== Rules ==
The American Fowling Association (AFA) has established a set of guidelines in order to govern sanctioned tournament play. All AFA members are expected to comply with the rules and regulations established and any violations or offenses will result in a team forfeiture at the discretion of a judge or official. Players have the option to protest a ruling to an official if they feel a violation has occurred by the opposing team.

=== Gameplay ===
Fowling is played one-on-one, in teams of two, or with doubles play where teams stand on opposite ends called lanes. In doubles play, teammates are positioned on the same lane and throw at the opposing team's lane. Similar to football, the game starts with a coin toss where the winner is granted the decision whether to fowl first or choose a lane to defend and defer to the other team to decide on fowling first. Each team alternates throwing the football at their opponent's pins while also alternating fowlers within the team. Each player has 20 seconds to throw starting from their intention on throwing. An imaginary foul line is designated for men and women who are throwing. Men are allowed to throw anywhere behind the back edge of the lane and women may throw from anywhere behind the front edge of the lane. Players may use any throwing style but must throw from the same location during each frame and must throw with the same arm for an entire match unless a medical emergency permit otherwise. At no time are players allowed to interfere with the throwing of the football or the ball contacting the pins. Defense is authorized only when a ball has crossed the foul line and is technically still in play until it stops. Any rule violation results in a foul throw for the other team and regains possession as well regardless of the throwing rotation predicted by the coin toss.

Like bowling, each match is broken down into frames. In match play, one frame is completed when all pins are knocked down on either lane. The team that accomplishes this first wins the frame. The game is over when a team wins two out of three frames. A tie occurs when the team that throws the last knocks down all the other team's pins. In the case of a tie, overtime is invoked in a sudden-death contest to determine the winner. Both teams place one pin anywhere on the fowling lane for their opponent's to throw at. A coin toss determines who throws first and no equalizer throw is allowed. The team that knocks their opponent's pin down first wins the match.

=== Layout and equipment ===
Fowling matches are played with two wooden platforms, 20 bowling pins, and a regulation-size football.

The lane surface shall be a 42-by-96-inch (1.1 m × 2.4 m) rectangle constructed of half-inch plywood fastened to a 2-inch × 4-inch wood frame edge. For ease of transportation, lanes made of two 42-by-48-inch (1.1 m × 1.2 m) plywood boards may also be used as long as they are correctly fastened together during tournament play. AFA-sanctioned tournaments should only be played on wooden fowling lanes due to significant variance in play for different surface materials. Each game consists of two lanes placed 32 feet (9.8 m) apart between the front edge of the lanes, facing each other. It is recommended that adjacent lanes be spaced at least 15 feet apart from each other.

Bowling pins should be of standard regulation size and weight and arranged in the standard, triangular bowling pin formation with equidistant 12-inch spacing between each pin from center to center.

Footballs must meet pro or college regulation size and weight standards for tournament play. Footballs should also be inflated to regulation pressure to avoid deflate-gate situations.

=== Competitions ===
The sport has grown significantly since its inception, with annual tournaments such as Super Fowl, featuring participants from over 32 states and multiple countries competing for the Golden Fowl trophy.

== See also ==
- Cornhole
- Horseshoes
- Ladder toss
- Washer pitching
- Lawn game
