= Savoy Pier =

Former pier in London, England

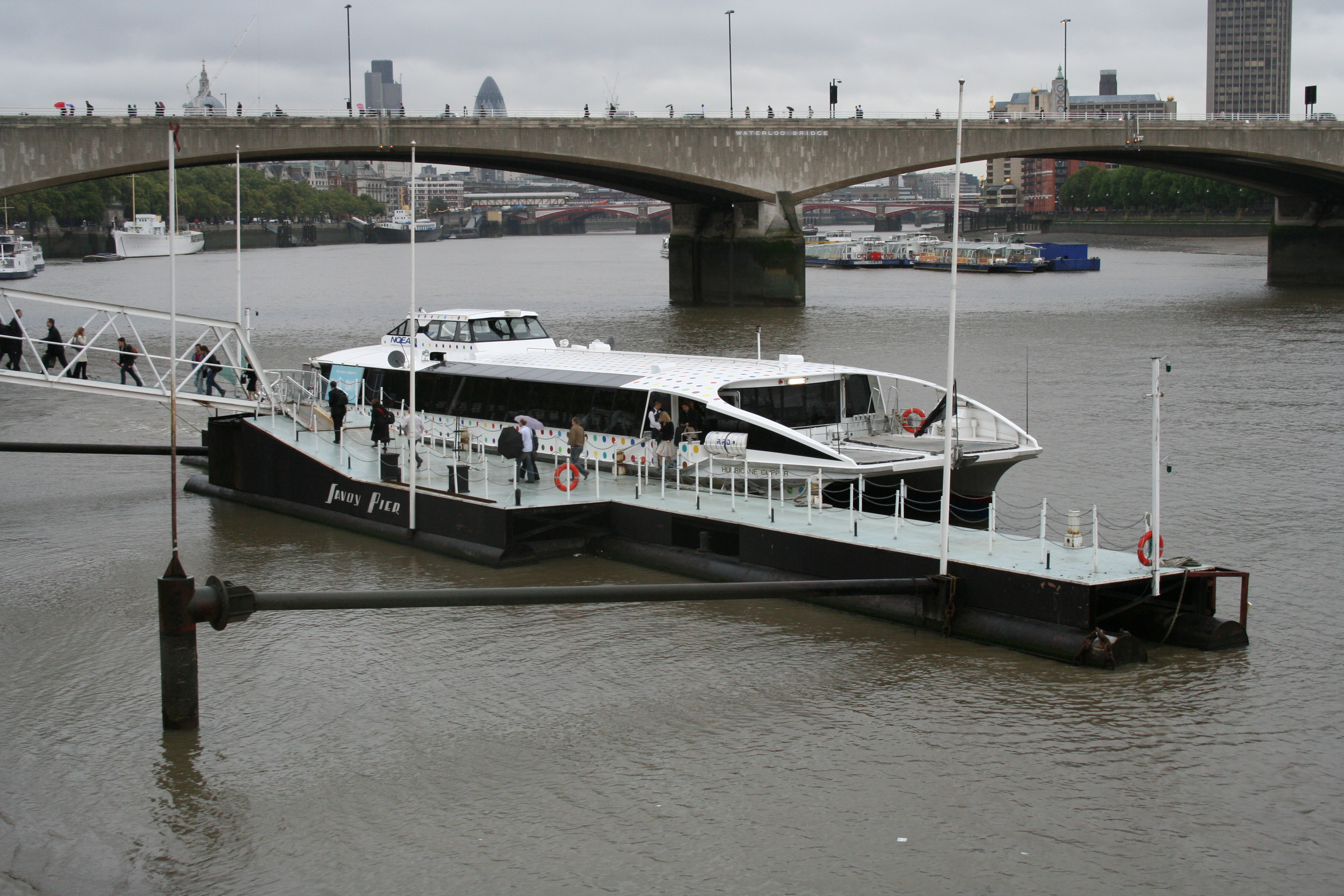
- Type: Designed for river bus and tourist/leisure services
- Location: River Thames, London, UK
- Coordinates: 51°30′31.5″N 0°7′09.85″W
- Owner: Woods River Cruises
- Operator: Woods' Silver Fleet

History
- Location within Central London

The Savoy Pier was a river pier located just to the south of the Savoy Hotel on the river Thames, close to the site of the old Savoy Wharf. The pier was the first central London base of Woods River Cruises Ltd, and was designed by Beckett Rankine in 1998 as a temporary structure. It is an unusual design being restrained by transverse radial arms and longitudinal mooring cables. The contractor was Downtown Marine Construction who have since ceased trading

Scheduled river bus services operated from Savoy Pier from April 2004, to November 2008 when they were transferred to Embankment Pier, a short distance up the Thames. It was decommissioned and removed in late 2019, and was replaced by a new 140m mooring pontoon known as 'Woods Quay' in July 2020. It has been proposed that Savoy Pier be relocated to Hammersmith Embankment to be used for a new cross-river Thames Clipper service.

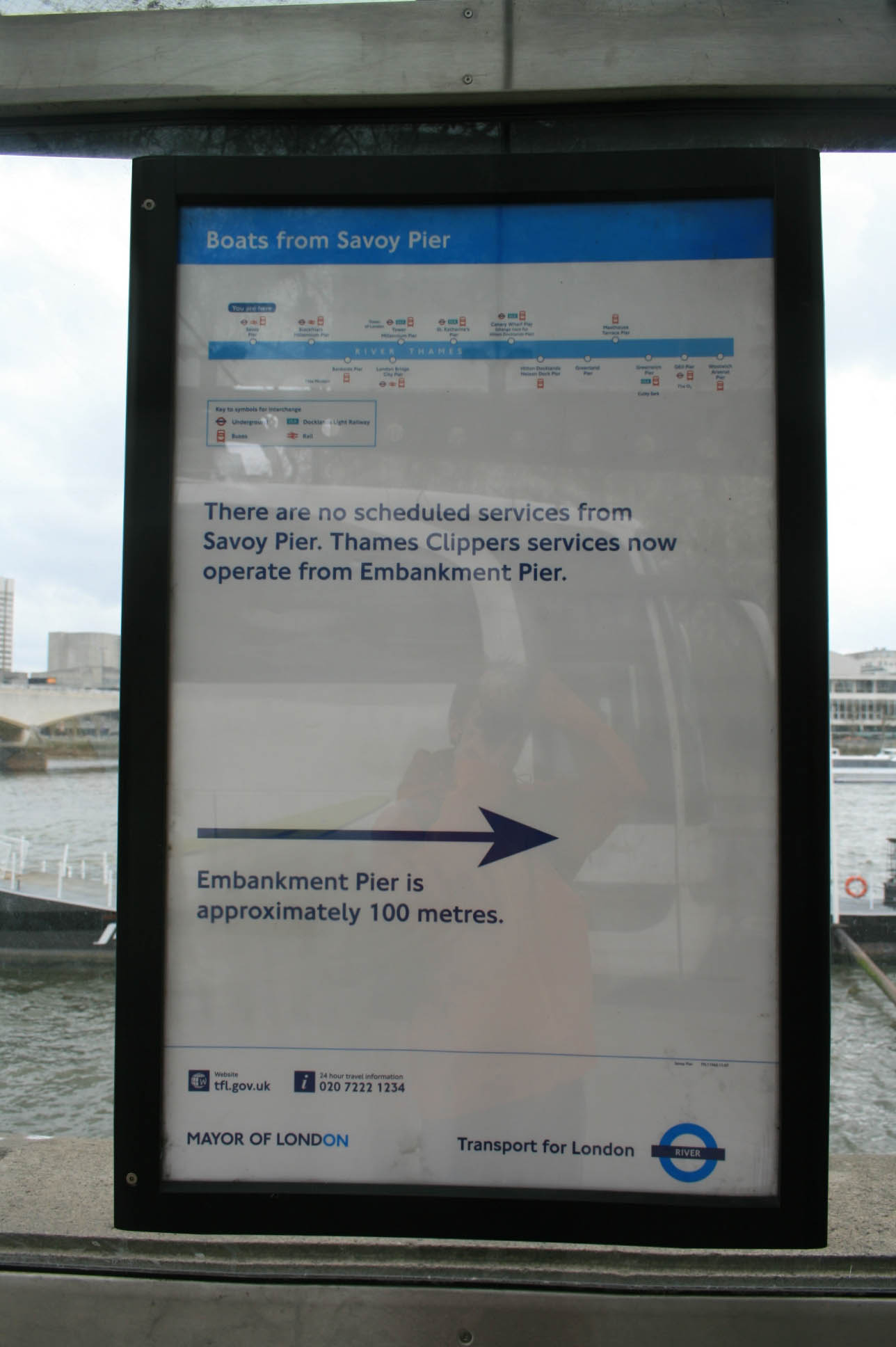
Notice of service transfer, November 2007

== Other public transport nearby ==
- Embankment Pier (Thames Clippers Riverline)
- Embankment Underground station (Circle and District lines)
- Temple Underground station (Circle and District lines)
- Covent Garden Underground station (Piccadilly line)

== Nearby Places ==
- Covent Garden
- South Bank Centre
