= List of statutory instruments of the United Kingdom, 2007 =

This is a list of statutory instruments of the United Kingdom in 2007.

== 1–100 ==
- Cider and Perry and Wine and Made-wine (Amendment) Regulations 2007 (S.I. 2007/4)
- Customs and Excise (Personal Reliefs for Special Visitors) (Amendment) Order 2007 (S.I. 2007/5)
- Borough Council of Sandwell (Watery Lane Canal Bridge) Scheme 2003 Confirmation Instrument 2007 (S.I. 2007/11)
- Stamp Duty Reserve Tax (UK Depositary Interest in Foreign Securities) (Amendment) Regulations 2007 (S.I. 2007/12)
- Air Passenger Duty (Rate) (Qualifying Territories) Order 2007 (S.I. 2007/22)
- Education (School Improvement Partner) (England) Regulations 2007 (S.I. 2007/25)
- Income-related Benefits (Subsidy to Authorities) (Miscellaneous Amendments and Electronic Communications) Order 2007 (S.I. 2007/26)
- Air Navigation (Dangerous Goods) (Amendment) Regulations 2007 (S.I. 2007/28)
- Offshore Installations (Safety Zones) Order 2007 (S.I. 2007/41)
- Food Hygiene (England) (Amendment) Regulations 2007 (S.I. 2007/56)
- Children and Young People's Plan (England) (Amendment) Regulations 2007 (S.I. 2007/57)
- Road Tolling (Interoperability of Electronic Road User Charging and Road Tolling Systems) Regulations 2007 (S.I. 2007/58)
- Education (New Secondary School Proposals) (England) (Amendment) Regulations 2007 (S.I. 2007/59)
- Occupational and Personal Pension Schemes (Prescribed Bodies) Regulations 2007 (S.I. 2007/60)
- Protection of Wrecks (Designation) (England) Order 2007 (S.I. 2007/61)
- Railways Act 2005 (Commencement No. 8) Order 2007 (S.I. 2007/62)
- Joint Municipal Waste Management Strategies (Disapplication of Duties) (England) Regulations 2007 (S.I. 2007/63)
- Air Quality Standards Regulations 2007 (S.I. 2007/64)
- Wycombe (Parishes) Order 2007 (S.I. 2007/65)
- Violent Crime Reduction Act 2006 (Commencement No. 1) Order 2007 (S.I. 2007/74)
- Rural Development (Enforcement) (England) Regulations 2007 (S.I. 2007/75)
- Pensions Act 2004 (Code of Practice) (Modification of subsisting rights) Appointed Day Order 2007 (S.I. 2007/76)
- Offshore Petroleum Activities (Conservation of Habitats) (Amendment) Regulations 2007 (S.I. 2007/77)
- Sulphur Content of Liquid Fuels (England and Wales) Regulations 2007 (S.I. 2007/79)
- Claims Management Services Tribunal Rules 2007 (S.I. 2007/90)
- Northern Ireland (St Andrews Agreement) Act 2006 (Commencement No.1) Order 2007 (S.I. 2007/92)
- Excepted Vehicles (Amendment of Schedule 1 to the Hydrocarbon Oil Duties Act 1979) Order 2007 (S.I. 2007/93)
- Compensation Act 2006 (Commencement No. 2) Order 2007 (S.I. 2007/94)
- Driving Licences (Exchangeable Licences) Order 2007 (S.I. 2007/95)
- Driving Licences (Exchangeable Licences) (Amendment) Order 2007 (S.I. 2007/96)

== 101–200 ==
- School Admissions (Adjudicator Determinations Relating to Looked After and Certain Other Children) (England) Regulations 2007 (S.I. 2007/105)
- Dairy Produce Quotas (Amendment) Regulations 2007 (S.I. 2007/106)
- Assisted Areas Order 2007 (S.I. 2007/107)
- Financial Services (EEA State) Regulations 2007 (S.I. 2007/108)
- Civil Partnership (Employee Share Ownership Plans) Order 2007 (S.I. 2007/109)
- Work at Height (Amendment) Regulations 2007 (S.I. 2007/114)
- Personal Injuries (NHS Charges) (Amounts) Regulations 2007 (S.I. 2007/115)
- Food for Particular Nutritional Uses (Addition of Substances for Specific Nutritional Purposes) (Wales) (Amendment) Regulations 2007 (S.I. 2007/116)
- Statutory Nuisance (Miscellaneous Provisions) (Wales) Regulations 2007 (S.I. 2007/117)
- Social Security (Contributions) (Amendment) Regulations 2007 (S.I. 2007/118)
- Seed (Wales) (Amendments for Tests and Trials etc.) Regulations 2007 (S.I. 2007/119)
- Statutory Nuisances (Miscellaneous Provisions) (Wales) Order 2007 (S.I. 2007/120)
- National Health Service (Free Prescriptions and Charges for Drugs and Appliances) (Wales) Regulations 2007 (S.I. 2007/121)
- National Health Service (General Ophthalmic Services) (Amendment) (Wales) Regulations 2007 (S.I. 2007/122)
- Consumer Credit Act 2006 (Commencement No. 2 and Transitional Provisions and Savings) Order 2007 (S.I. 2007/123)
- Uncertificated Securities (Amendment) Regulations 2007 (S.I. 2007/124)
- Financial Services and Markets Act 2000 (Exemption) (Amendment) Order 2007 (S.I. 2007/125)
- Financial Services and Markets Act 2000 (Markets in Financial Instruments) Regulations 2007 (S.I. 2007/126)
- Insolvency Practitioners and Insolvency Services Account (Fees) (Amendment) Order 2007 (S.I. 2007/133)
- District of South Northamptonshire (Electoral Changes) (Amendment) Order 2007 (S.I. 2007/137)
- Borough of Castle Morpeth (Electoral Changes) Order 2007 (S.I. 2007/138)
- Borough of Dacorum (Electoral Changes) Order 2007 (S.I. 2007/139)
- District of East Northamptonshire (Electoral Changes) Order 2007 (S.I. 2007/140)
- District of Mendip (Electoral Changes) Order 2007 (S.I. 2007/141)
- District of Newark and Sherwood (Electoral Changes) Order 2007 (S.I. 2007/142)
- District of North Wiltshire (Electoral Changes) Order 2007 (S.I. 2007/143)
- District of South Gloucestershire (Electoral Changes) Order 2007 (S.I. 2007/144)
- District of South Holland (Electoral Changes) Order 2007 (S.I. 2007/145)
- Borough of Taunton Deane (Electoral Changes) Order 2007 (S.I. 2007/146)
- District of Wansbeck (Electoral Changes) Order 2007 (S.I. 2007/148)
- Emergency Workers (Obstruction) Act 2006 (Commencement) Order 2007 (S.I. 2007/153)
- Valley Invicta Park Federation (School Governance) Order 2007 (S.I. 2007/167)
- Returning Officers (Parliamentary Constituencies) (Wales) Order 2007 (S.I. 2007/171)
- Education (Induction Arrangements for School Teachers) (Consolidation) (England) (Amendment) Regulations 2007 (S.I. 2007/172)
- Gambling Act 2005 (Proceedings of Licensing Committees and Sub-committees) (Premises Licences and Provisional Statements) (England and Wales) Regulations 2007 (S.I. 2007/173)
- Environmental Offences (Fixed Penalties) (Miscellaneous Provisions) Regulations 2007 (S.I. 2007/175)
- Education (Student Support) Regulations 2007 (S.I. 2007/176)
- M62 Motorway (Junction 6 Improvements) (Connecting Roads) Scheme 2007 (S.I. 2007/177)
- Notification of Marketing of Food for Particular Nutritional Uses (England) Regulations 2007 (S.I. 2007/181)
- Immigration, Asylum and Nationality Act 2006 (Commencement No. 4) Order 2007 (S.I. 2007/182)
- Quick-frozen Foodstuffs (England) Regulations 2007 (S.I. 2007/191)
- Education (Admission Forums) (England) (Amendment) Regulations 2007 (S.I. 2007/192)
- European Communities (Designation) Order 2007 (S.I. 2007/193)
- School Admissions (Co-ordination of Admission Arrangements) (England) Regulations 2007 (S.I. 2007/194)
- Education (Prohibition from Teaching or Working with Children) (Amendment) Regulations 2007 (S.I. 2007/195)
- Official Controls (Animals, Feed and Food) (Wales) Regulations 2007 (S.I. 2007/196)
- Day Care and Child Minding (Disqualification) (England) (Amendment) Regulations 2007 (S.I. 2007/197)

== 201–300 ==
- Environmental Impact Assessment (Uncultivated Land and Semi-natural Areas) (Wales) (Amendment) Regulations 2007 (S.I. 2007/203)
- Health Act 2006 (Commencement No. 1 and Transitional Provisions) (Wales) Order 2007 (S.I. 2007/204)
- National Health Service (Miscellaneous Amendments Concerning Independent Nurse Prescribers, Supplementary Prescribers, Nurse Independent Prescribers and Pharmacist Independent Prescribers) (Wales) Regulations 2007 (S.I. 2007/205)
- Value Added Tax (Health and Welfare) Order 2007 (S.I. 2007/206)
- Terrorism Act 2000 (Business in the Regulated Sector) Order 2007 (S.I. 2007/207)
- Proceeds of Crime Act 2002 (Business in the Regulated Sector) Order 2007 (S.I. 2007/208)
- Compensation (Exemptions) Order 2007 (S.I. 2007/209)
- Contaminants in Food (England) Regulations 2007 (S.I. 2007/210)
- Tax Credits (Approval of Child Care Providers) (Wales) Scheme 2007 (S.I. 2007/226)
- Local Authorities (Alteration of Requisite Calculations) (England) Regulations 2007 (S.I. 2007/227)
- Local Government Pension Scheme (Amendment) Regulations 2007 (S.I. 2007/228)
- Electoral Administration Act 2006 (Commencement No. 3) Order 2007 (S.I. 2007/230)
- A1 Trunk Road (A151/B676 Junction and B6403 Junction Improvements Colsterworth) Order 2007 (S.I. 2007/231)
- A1 Trunk Road (A151/B676 Junction and B6403 Junction Improvements Colsterworth) (Detrunking) Order 2007 (S.I. 2007/232)
- A34 Trunk Road (Chieveley Interchange) (40 Miles Per Hour Speed Limit) Order 2007 (S.I. 2007/233)
- National Assembly for Wales (Representation of the People) Order 2007 (S.I. 2007/236)
- Road Safety Act 2006 (Commencement No. 1) Order 2007 (S.I. 2007/237)
- Copyright (Certification of Licensing Scheme for Educational Recording of Broadcasts) (Educational Recording Agency Limited) Order 2007 (S.I. 2007/266)
- Local Access Forums (England) Regulations 2007 (S.I. 2007/268)
- Gambling (Operating Licence and Single-Machine Permit Fees) (Amendment) Regulations 2007 (S.I. 2007/269)
- Parliamentary Pensions (Amendment) Regulations 2007 (S.I. 2007/270)
- Social Security Investigation Powers (Arrangements with Northern Ireland) Regulations 2007 (S.I. 2007/271)
- Broadcasting Act 1990 (Independent Radio Services Exceptions) Order 2007 (S.I. 2007/272)
- Copyright and Performances (Application to Other Countries) Order 2007 (S.I. 2007/273)
- Air Navigation (Amendment) Order 2007 (S.I. 2007/274)
- Transfer of Functions (Asylum Support Adjudicators) Order 2007 (S.I. 2007/275)
- Patents (Convention Countries) Order 2007 (S.I. 2007/276)
- Designs (Convention Countries) Order 2007 (S.I. 2007/277)
- Wireless Telegraphy (Isle of Man) Order 2007 (S.I. 2007/278)
- Science and Technology Facilities Council Order 2007 (S.I. 2007/279)
- Technology Strategy Board Order 2007 (S.I. 2007/280)
- Iran (Financial Sanctions) Order 2007 (S.I. 2007/281)
- Iran (United Nations Measures) (Overseas Territories) Order 2007 (S.I. 2007/282)
- Lebanon (United Nations Sanctions) (Overseas Territories) Order 2007 (S.I. 2007/283)
- Liberia (Restrictive Measures) (Overseas Territories) (Amendment) Order 2007 (S.I. 2007/284)
- Scottish Parliament (Disqualification) Order 2007 (S.I. 2007/285)
- Scotland Act 1998 (Agency Arrangements) (Specification) Order 2007 (S.I. 2007/286)
- Street Works (Amendment) (Northern Ireland) Order 2007 (S.I. 2007/287)
- Police and Criminal Evidence (Amendment) (Northern Ireland) Order 2007 (S.I. 2007/288)
- Pharmacists and Pharmacy Technicians Order 2007 (S.I. 2007/289)
- Petroleum Act 1998 (Third Party Access) Order 2007 (S.I. 2007/290)
- Guarantees of Origin of Electricity Produced from High-efficiency Cogeneration Regulations 2007 (S.I. 2007/292)
- Biocidal Products (Amendment) Regulations 2007 (S.I. 2007/293)
- Housing Benefit (Daily Liability Entitlement) Amendment Regulations 2007 (S.I. 2007/294)
- Plant Protection Products (Fees) Regulations 2007 (S.I. 2007/295)
- Sexual Offences Act 2003 (Amendment of Schedules 3 and 5) Order 2007 (S.I. 2007/296)

== 301–400 ==
- Capital Allowances (Leases of Background Plant or Machinery for a Building) Order 2007 (S.I. 2007/303)
- Long Funding Leases (Elections) Regulations 2007 (S.I. 2007/304)
- Housing Act 2004 (Commencement No. 4) (Wales) Order 2007 (S.I. 2007/305)
- Highways Act 1980 (Gating Orders) (Wales) Regulations 2007 (S.I. 2007/306)
- Review of Children's Cases (Wales) Regulations 2007 (S.I. 2007/307)
- Northern Ireland Assembly (Elections) (Amendment) Order 2007 (S.I. 2007/308)
- Charities Act 2006 (Commencement No 1, Transitional Provisions and Savings) Order 2007 (S.I. 2007/309)
- Placement of Children (Wales) Regulations 2007 (S.I. 2007/310)
- Children's Homes (Wales) (Miscellaneous Amendments) Regulations 2007 (S.I. 2007/311)
- Decommissioning of Fishing Vessels Scheme 2007 (S.I. 2007/312)
- Value Added Tax (Amendment) Regulations 2007 (S.I. 2007/313)
- Fuel-testing Pilot Projects (Biomix Project) Regulations 2007 (S.I. 2007/314)
- Local Health Boards (Functions) (Wales) (Amendment) Regulations 2007 (S.I. 2007/315)
- Children's Commissioner for Wales (Amendment) Regulations 2007 (S.I. 2007/316)
- Immigration Services Commissioner (Designated Professional Body) (Fees) Order 2007 (S.I. 2007/317)
- Companies Acts (Unregistered Companies) Regulations 2007 (S.I. 2007/318)
- Gambling Act 2005 (Inspection) (Provision of Information) Regulations 2007 (S.I. 2007/319)
- Construction (Design and Management) Regulations 2007 (S.I. 2007/320)
- Greater London Authority (Allocation of Grants for Precept Calculations) Regulations 2007 (S.I. 2007/321)
- District of West Wiltshire (Electoral Changes) Order 2007 (S.I. 2007/323)
- Preston (Electoral Changes) Order 2007 (S.I. 2007/326)
- Food Supplements (England) (Amendment) Regulations 2007 (S.I. 2007/330)
- Chiltern (Parishes) Order 2007 (S.I. 2007/332)
- Basildon (Parishes) Order 2007 (S.I. 2007/333)
- Bedford (Parishes) Order 2007 (S.I. 2007/334)
- Aylesbury Vale (Parishes) Order 2007 (S.I. 2007/335)
- Test Valley (Parishes) Order 2007 (S.I. 2007/336)
- Traffic Management (Guidance on Intervention Criteria) (England) Order 2007 (S.I. 2007/339)
- M621 Motorway (Speed Limit) (Amendment) Regulations 2007 (S.I. 2007/349)
- Education (Budget Statements) (England) Regulations 2007 (S.I. 2007/356)
- Social Security (Recovery of Benefits) (Amendment) Regulations 2007 (S.I. 2007/357)
- Motor Vehicles (Type Approval for Goods Vehicles) (Great Britain) (Amendment) Regulations 2007 (S.I. 2007/361)
- School Finance (Amendment) (England) Regulations 2007 (S.I. 2007/365)
- Occupational Pension Schemes (Contracting-out) (Amount Required for Restoring State Scheme Rights) Amendment Regulations 2007 (S.I. 2007/366)
- Food Hygiene (Wales) (Amendment) Regulations 2007 (S.I. 2007/373)
- National Assembly for Wales (Date of First Meeting of the Assembly Constituted by the Government of Wales Act 2006) Order 2007 (S.I. 2007/374)
- Home Energy Efficiency Schemes (Wales) Regulations 2007 (S.I. 2007/375)
- Products of Animal Origin (Third Country Imports) (Wales) Regulations 2007 (S.I. 2007/376)
- Wireless Telegraphy (Licence Award) Regulations 2007 (S.I. 2007/378)
- Wireless Telegraphy (Limitation of Number of Spectrum Access Licences) Order 2007 (S.I. 2007/379)
- Wireless Telegraphy (Spectrum Trading) (Amendment) Regulations 2007 (S.I. 2007/380)
- Wireless Telegraphy (Register) (Amendment) Regulations 2007 (S.I. 2007/381)
- Financial Services and Markets Act 2000 (Ombudsman Scheme) (Consumer Credit Jurisdiction) Order 2007 (S.I. 2007/383)
- Housing (Right to Buy)(Service Charges) (Amendment)(England) Order 2007 (S.I. 2007/384)
- Local Government (Best Value Authorities) (Power to Trade) (England) (Amendment) Order 2007 (S.I. 2007/385)
- Dangerous Substances and Preparations (Safety) (Amendment) Regulations 2007 (S.I. 2007/386)
- Consumer Credit Act 2006 (Commencement No. 2 and Transitional Provisions and Savings) (Amendment) Order 2007 (S.I. 2007/387)
- Accounts and Audit (Wales) (Amendment) Regulations 2007 (S.I. 2007/388)
- Quick-frozen Foodstuffs (Wales) Regulations 2007 (S.I. 2007/389)
- Clean Neighbourhoods and Environment Act 2005 (Commencement No.4) (England) Order 2007 (S.I. 2007/390)
- Criminal Justice Act 2003 (Commencement No.8 and Transitional and Saving Provisions) (Amendment) Order 2007 (S.I. 2007/391)
- Wireless Telegraphy (Recognised Spectrum Access Charges) Regulations 2007 (S.I. 2007/392)
- Wireless Telegraphy (Recognised Spectrum Access) Regulations 2007 (S.I. 2007/393)
- Wireless Telegraphy (Limitation of Number of Grants of Recognised Spectrum Access) Order 2007 (S.I. 2007/394)
- Agricultural Wages Committee (Wales) Order 2007 (S.I. 2007/395)
- Commissioner for Older People in Wales (Appointment) Regulations 2007 (S.I. 2007/396)
- Local Authorities (Alternative Arrangements) (Wales) Regulations 2007 (S.I. 2007/397)
- Commissioner for Older People in Wales Regulations 2007 (S.I. 2007/398)
- Local Authorities (Executive Arrangements) (Functions and Responsibilities) (Wales) Regulations 2007 (S.I. 2007/399)
- Medical Devices (Amendment) Regulations 2007 (S.I. 2007/400)

== 401–500 ==
- Gangmasters (Licensing Conditions) (No. 2) (Amendment) Rules 2007 (S.I. 2007/401)
- Welfare of Animals (Slaughter or Killing) (Amendment) (England) Regulations 2007 (S.I. 2007/402)
- Stockton-on-Tees (Parishes) Order 2007 (S.I. 2007/403)
- West Lancashire (Parish) Order 2007 (S.I. 2007/404)
- Poultry Breeding Flocks and Hatcheries (England) Order 2007 (S.I. 2007/405)
- Town and Country Planning (General Permitted Development) (Amendment) (England) Order 2007 (S.I. 2007/406)
- Environmental Noise (Identification of Noise Sources) (England) Regulations 2007 (S.I. 2007/415)
- Marriage Act 1949 (Remedial) Order 2007 (S.I. 2007/438)
- Royal Pharmaceutical Society of Great Britain (Registration Rules) Order of Council 2007 (S.I. 2007/441)
- Royal Pharmaceutical Society of Great Britain (Fitness to Practise and Disqualification etc. Rules) Order of Council 2007 (S.I. 2007/442)
- Adventure Activities Licensing (Amendment) Regulations 2007 (S.I. 2007/446)
- Adventure Activities (Licensing) (Designation) Order 2007 (S.I. 2007/447)
- Diseases of Animals (Approved Disinfectants) (England) Order 2007 (S.I. 2007/448)
- Colours in Food (Amendment) (England) Regulations 2007 (S.I. 2007/453)
- Gambling Act 2005 (Family Entertainment Centre Gaming Machine) (Permits) Regulations 2007 (S.I. 2007/454)
- Gambling Act 2005 (Prize Gaming) (Permits) Regulations 2007 (S.I. 2007/455)
- Commons Act 2006 (Commencement No. 2, Transitional Provisions and Savings) (England) Order 2007 (S.I. 2007/456)
- Commons (Registration of Town or Village Greens) (Interim Arrangements) (England) Regulations 2007 (S.I. 2007/457)
- Stamp Duty and Stamp Duty Reserve Tax (Extension of Exceptions relating to Recognised Exchanges) (Amendment) Regulations 2007 (S.I. 2007/458)
- Gambling Act 2005 (Premises Licences and Provisional Statements) Regulations 2007 (S.I. 2007/459)
- Office for Standards in Education, Children's Services and Skills (Children's Rights Director) Regulations 2007 (S.I. 2007/460)
- Competition Commission (Water Industry) Penalties Order 2007 (S.I. 2007/461)
- Education and Inspections Act 2006 (Inspection of Local Authorities) Regulations 2007 (S.I. 2007/462)
- Childcare Act 2006 (Childcare Assessments) Regulations 2007 (S.I. 2007/463)
- Education and Inspections Act 2006 (Prescribed Education and Training etc.) Regulations 2007 (S.I. 2007/464)
- Greenhouse Gas Emissions Trading Scheme (Amendment) Regulations 2007 (S.I. 2007/465)
- Road Safety Act 2006 (Commencement No. 1) (England and Wales) Order 2007 (S.I. 2007/466)
- Immigration, Asylum and Nationality Act 2006 (Commencement No. 5) Order 2007 (S.I. 2007/467)
- Vehicle and Operator Services Agency Trading Fund (Maximum Borrowing) Order 2007 (S.I. 2007/468)
- Accession (Immigration and Worker Authorisation) (Amendment) Regulations 2007 (S.I. 2007/475)
- Milk (Cessation of Production) (Revocation) Scheme 2007 (S.I. 2007/476)
- Dairy Produce (Miscellaneous Provisions) Regulations 2007 (S.I. 2007/477)
- NHS Direct National Health Service Trust (Establishment) Order 2007 (S.I. 2007/478)
- Gambling (Premises Licence Fees) (England and Wales) Regulations 2007 (S.I. 2007/479)
- Burnley (Parish Electoral Arrangements) Order 2007 (S.I. 2007/483)
- West Lancashire (Parish Electoral Arrangements and Electoral Changes) Order 2007 (S.I. 2007/489)
- Meat (Official Controls Charges) (England) Regulations 2007 (S.I. 2007/492)
- Tax and Civil Partnership Regulations 2007 (S.I. 2007/493)
- Registered Pension Schemes (Standard Lifetime and Annual Allowances) Order 2007 (S.I. 2007/494)
- Motor Vehicles (Approval) (Fees) (Amendment) Regulations 2007 (S.I. 2007/495)
- School Admissions (Alteration and Variation of, and Objections to, Arrangements) (England) Regulations 2007 (S.I. 2007/496)
- Education (Determination of Admission Arrangements) (Amendment) (England) Regulations 2007 (S.I. 2007/497)
- Road Vehicles (Registration and Licensing) (Amendment) Regulations 2007 (S.I. 2007/498)
- Animal Welfare Act 2006 (Commencement No. 1) (England) Order 2007 (S.I. 2007/499)
- Public Service Vehicles Accessibility (Amendment) Regulations 2007 (S.I. 2007/500)

== 501–600 ==
- Council Tax and Non-Domestic Rating (Amendment) (England) Regulations 2007 (S.I. 2007/501)
- Public Service Vehicles (Conditions of Fitness, Equipment, Use and Certification) (Amendment) Regulations 2007 (S.I. 2007/502)
- Goods Vehicles (Plating and Testing) (Amendment) Regulations 2007 (S.I. 2007/503)
- NHS Direct Special Health Authority Abolition Order 2007 (S.I. 2007/504)
- Healthy Start Scheme and Welfare Food (Amendment) Regulations 2007 (S.I. 2007/505)
- Motor Vehicles (Tests) (Amendment) Regulations 2007 (S.I. 2007/506)
- Motor Cycles Etc. (Single Vehicle Approval) (Fees) (Amendment) Regulations 2007 (S.I. 2007/507)
- Insolvency Proceedings (Fees) (Amendment) Order 2007 (S.I. 2007/521)
- Enterprise Act 2002 (EEA State) (Amendment) Regulations 2007 (S.I. 2007/528)
- Cattle Identification Regulations 2007 (S.I. 2007/529)
- Climate Change and Sustainable Energy Act 2006 (Commencement) Order 2007 (S.I. 2007/538)
- National Lottery Act 2006 (Commencement No. 4) Order 2007 (S.I. 2007/539)
- Commons Registration (Objections and Maps) (Amendment) (England) Regulations 2007 (S.I. 2007/540)
- Social Security (Claims and Payments) Amendment Regulations 2007 (S.I. 2007/541)
- National Health Service (Optical Charges and Payments) Amendment Regulations 2007 (S.I. 2007/542)
- National Health Service (Charges for Drugs and Appliances) Amendment Regulations 2007 (S.I. 2007/543)
- National Health Service (Dental Charges, General Dental Services Contracts and Personal Dental Services Agreements) Amendment Regulations 2007 (S.I. 2007/544)
- Planning and Compulsory Purchase Act 2004 (Commencement No.4 and Consequential, Transitional and Savings Provisions) (Wales) (Amendment No.1) Order 2007 (S.I. 2007/546)
- Road Traffic (Permitted Parking Area and Special Parking Area) (Metropolitan Borough of Tameside) Order 2007 (S.I. 2007/547)
- Enduring Powers of Attorney (Prescribed Form) (Amendment) Amendment Regulations 2007 (S.I. 2007/548)
- Enduring Powers of Attorney (Welsh Language Prescribed Form) (Amendment) Regulations 2007 (S.I. 2007/549)
- Charities (Bridge House Estates) Order 2007 (S.I. 2007/550)
- Bus Lane Contraventions (Approved Local Authorities) (England) (Amendment) Order 2007 (S.I. 2007/551)
- Commission for Social Care Inspection (Fees and Frequency of Inspections) Regulations 2007 (S.I. 2007/556)
- Lewisham Primary Care Trust (Transfer of Trust Property) Order 2007 (S.I. 2007/557)
- National Health Service (Functions of Strategic Health Authorities and Primary Care Trusts and Administration Arrangements) (England) (Amendment) Regulations 2007 (S.I. 2007/559)
- Home Information Pack (Redress Scheme) Order 2007 (S.I. 2007/560)
- Royal Pharmaceutical Society of Great Britain (Fitness to Practise and Registration Appeals Committees and their Advisers Rules) Order of Council 2007 (S.I. 2007/561)
- Drugs Act 2005 (Commencement No. 5) Order 2007 (S.I. 2007/562)
- Mental Capacity Act 2005 (Commencement No. 1)(England and Wales) Order 2007 (S.I. 2007/563)
- Approved European Pharmacy Qualifications Order of Council 2007 (S.I. 2007/564)
- Postgraduate Medical Education and Training Board (Fees) Rules Order 2007 (S.I. 2007/565)
- School Admissions Code (Appointed Day) (England) Order 2007 (S.I. 2007/566)
- Local Authorities (Alteration of Requisite Calculations) (Wales) Regulations 2007 (S.I. 2007/571)
- Rent Repayment Orders (Supplementary Provisions) (England) Regulations 2007 (S.I. 2007/572)
- Local Authorities (Capital Finance and Accounting) (Amendment) (England) Regulations 2007 (S.I. 2007/573)
- Gambling Appeals Tribunal (Amendment) Rules 2007 (S.I. 2007/577)
- Approval of Code of Practice (Private Retirement Housing) (Wales) Order 2007 (S.I. 2007/578)
- Colours in Food (Amendment) (Wales) Regulations 2007 (S.I. 2007/579)
- Council Tax (Discount Disregards) (Amendment) (Wales) Order 2007 (S.I. 2007/580)
- Council Tax (Additional Provisions for Discount Disregards) (Amendment) (Wales) Regulations 2007 (S.I. 2007/581)
- Council Tax (Administration and Enforcement) (Amendment) (Wales) Regulations 2007 (S.I. 2007/582)
- Commons (Severance of Rights) (Wales) Order 2007 (S.I. 2007/583)
- Street Works (Inspection Fees) (England) (Amendment) Regulations 2007 (S.I. 2007/584)
- Local Government (Best Value) Performance Indicators and Performance Standards (England) (Amendment) Order 2007 (S.I. 2007/585)
- Civil Aviation Act 2006 (Commencement No.1) Order 2007 (S.I. 2007/598)
- Consistent Financial Reporting (England) (Amendment) Regulations 2007 (S.I. 2007/599)
- Office for Standards in Education, Children's Services and Skills and Her Majesty's Chief Inspector of Education, Children's Services and Skills (Allocation of Rights and Liabilities) Order 2007 (S.I. 2007/600)

== 601–700 ==
- Domestic Violence, Crime and Victims Act 2004 (Commencement No. 8) Order 2007 (S.I. 2007/602)
- Education and Inspections Act 2006 (Consequential Amendments) Regulations 2007 (S.I. 2007/603)
- Blood Safety and Quality (Amendment) Regulations 2007 (S.I. 2007/604)
- Vehicle Drivers (Certificates of Professional Competence) Regulations 2007 (S.I. 2007/605)
- Passenger and Goods Vehicles (Recording Equipment) (Approval of Fitters and Workshops) (Fees) (Amendment) Regulations 2007 (S.I. 2007/606)
- Industrial Training Levy (Construction Industry Training Board) Order 2007 (S.I. 2007/607)
- Ouseburn Barrage Order 2007 (S.I. 2007/608)
- Industrial Training Levy (Engineering Construction Industry Training Board) Order 2007 (S.I. 2007/609)
- Medicines for Human Use and Medical Devices (Fees Amendments) Regulations 2007 (S.I. 2007/610)
- Waste (Amendment) (Northern Ireland) Order 2007 (S.I. 2007/611)
- District Electoral Areas Commissioner (Northern Ireland) (Amendment) Order 2007 (S.I. 2007/612)
- Civil Aviation (Isle of Man) Order 2007 (S.I. 2007/614)
- Education (Inspectors of Schools in England) Order 2007 (S.I. 2007/615)
- General Medical Council (Constitution) (Amendment) Order 2007 (S.I. 2007/616)
- European Communities (Employment in the Civil Service) Order 2007 (S.I. 2007/617)
- Disability Discrimination (Public Authorities) (Statutory Duties) (Amendment) Regulations 2007 (S.I. 2007/618)
- Hill Farm Allowance Regulations 2007 (S.I. 2007/619)
- Curf and Wimblington Combined Internal Drainage Board Order 2007 (S.I. 2007/620)
- Criminal Justice and Public Order Act 1994 (Commencement No. 14) Order 2007 (S.I. 2007/621)
- Electricity (Class Exemptions from the Requirement for a Licence) (Amendment) Order 2007 (S.I. 2007/629)
- Exempt Charities Order 2007 (S.I. 2007/630)
- Social Security (Netherlands) Order 2007 (S.I. 2007/631)
- International Transport of Goods under Cover of TIR Carnets (Fees) (Amendment) Regulations 2007 (S.I. 2007/632)
- Common Agricultural Policy Single Payment Scheme (Set-aside) (England) (Amendment) Regulations 2007 (S.I. 2007/633)
- International Carriage of Dangerous Goods by Road (Fees) (Amendment) Regulations 2007 (S.I. 2007/634)
- Plant Protection Products (Amendment) Regulations 2007 (S.I. 2007/636)
- Pigs (Records, Identification and Movement) Order 2007 (S.I. 2007/642)
- New Northern Ireland Assembly Elections (Returning Officer's Charges) (Amendment) Order 2007 (S.I. 2007/644)
- Pensions (Polish Forces) Scheme (Extension) Order 2007 (S.I. 2007/645)
- Personal Injuries (Civilians) (Amendment) Scheme 2007 (S.I. 2007/646)
- Bus Lane Contraventions (Approved Local Authorities) (England) (Amendment) (No. 2) Order 2007 (S.I. 2007/647)
- Road Traffic (Permitted Parking Area and Special Parking Area) (Isle of Wight) Order 2007 (S.I. 2007/648)
- Consular Fees Order 2007 (S.I. 2007/649)
- Royal Air Force Terms of Service Regulations 2007 (S.I. 2007/650)
- Air Force Act 1955 (Part 1) Regulations 2007 (S.I. 2007/651)
- Road Traffic (Permitted Parking Area and Special Parking Area) (County of Hampshire) (Borough of Fareham) Order 2007 (S.I. 2007/652)
- Warwick (Parishes) Order 2007 (S.I. 2007/656)
- Courts-Martial Appeal (Review of Sentencing) Regulations 2007 (S.I. 2007/660)
- Lord Chancellor (Transfer of Functions and Supplementary Provisions) Order 2007 (S.I. 2007/661)
- Armed Forces Act 2001 (Commencement No.8) Order 2007 (S.I. 2007/662)
- Road Traffic (Permitted Parking Area and Special Parking Area) (County of Surrey) (Borough of Waverley) Order 2007 (S.I. 2007/664)
- Income Tax (Construction Industry Scheme) (Amendment) Regulations 2007 (S.I. 2007/672)
- Curd Cheese (Restriction on Placing on the Market) (England) (Revocation) Regulations 2007 (S.I. 2007/673)
- National Health Service (Pharmaceutical Services) (Remuneration for Persons providing Pharmaceutical Services) (Amendment) Regulations 2007 (S.I. 2007/674)
- Judicial Pensions and Retirement Act 1993 (Addition of Qualifying Judicial Offices) Order 2007 (S.I. 2007/675)
- Blackburn with Darwen (Maintained Nursery School Governance) (Amendment) Order 2007 (S.I. 2007/676)
- Patents (Amendment) Rules 2007 (S.I. 2007/677)
- Corporation Tax (Surrender of Terminal Losses on Films and Claims for Relief) Regulations 2007 (S.I. 2007/678)
- Mental Capacity Act 2005 (Loss of Capacity during Research Project) (England) Regulations 2007 (S.I. 2007/679)
- Civil Proceedings Fees (Amendment) Order 2007 (S.I. 2007/680)
- Public Trustee (Fees) (Amendment) Order 2007 (S.I. 2007/681)
- Family Proceedings Fees (Amendment) Order 2007 (S.I. 2007/682)
- Authorised Investment Funds (Tax) (Amendment) Regulations 2007 (S.I. 2007/683)
- Taxes (Interest Rate) (Amendment) Regulations 2007 (S.I. 2007/684)
- Guaranteed Minimum Pensions Increase Order 2007 (S.I. 2007/686)
- Goods Vehicles (Licensing of Operators) (Fees) (Amendment) Regulations 2007 (S.I. 2007/687)
- Social Security Benefits Up-rating Order 2007 (S.I. 2007/688)
- Public Service Vehicles (Operators' Licences) (Fees) (Amendment) Regulations 2007 (S.I. 2007/689)
- Public Service Vehicles (Registration of Local Services) (Amendment) (England and Wales) Regulations 2007 (S.I. 2007/690)
- Minibus and Other Section 19 Permit Buses (Amendment) Regulations 2007 (S.I. 2007/691)
- Curd Cheese (Restriction on Placing on the Market) (Wales) (Revocation) Regulations 2007 692)
- Community Bus (Amendment) Regulations 2007 (S.I. 2007/693)
- Her Majesty's Chief Inspector of Education, Children's Services and Skills (Fees and Frequency of Inspections) (Children's Homes etc.) Regulations 2007 (S.I. 2007/694)
- Gangmasters (Licensing) Act 2004 (Commencement No. 5) Order 2007 (S.I. 2007/695)
- Awards for All (England) Joint Scheme (Authorisation) Order 2007 (S.I. 2007/696)
- Motor Cars (Driving Instruction) (Amendment) Regulations 2007 (S.I. 2007/697)
- Motor Vehicles (Driving Licences) (Amendment) Regulations 2007 (S.I. 2007/698)
- Criminal Procedure (Amendment) Rules 2007 (S.I. 2007/699)
- Police Act 1997 (Criminal Records) (Amendment) Regulations 2007 (S.I. 2007/700)

== 701–800 ==
- Controls on Dogs (Non-application to Designated Land) (Wales) Order 2007 (S.I. 2007/701)
- Dog Control Orders (Miscellaneous Provisions) (Wales) Regulations 2007 (S.I. 2007/702)
- Prevention of Terrorism Act 2005 (Continuance in force of sections 1 to 9) Order 2007 (S.I. 2007/706)
- Criminal Justice Act 2003 (Surcharge) Order 2007 (S.I. 2007/707)
- Houses in Multiple Occupation (Specified Educational Establishments) (England) Regulations 2007 (S.I. 2007/708)
- Police and Justice Act 2006 (Commencement No. 2, Transitional and Saving Provisions) Order 2007 (S.I. 2007/709)
- Courts-Martial Appeal (Amendment) Rules 2007 (S.I. 2007/710)
- Courts-Martial (Review of Sentencing) (Categories of Offences) Order 2007 (S.I. 2007/711)
- Education (Provision of Information About Young Children) (England) Regulations 2007 (S.I. 2007/712)
- Pollution Prevention and Control (England and Wales) (Amendment) Regulations 2007 (S.I. 2007/713)
- Road Traffic (Permitted Parking Area and Special Parking Area) (County of Gwynedd) Order 2007 (S.I. 2007/714)
- Northern Ireland Arms Decommissioning Act 1997 (Amnesty Period) Order 2007 (S.I. 2007/715)
- Pneumoconiosis etc. (Workers' Compensation) (Payment of Claims) (Amendment) Regulations 2007 (S.I. 2007/716)
- Air Quality Standards (Wales) Regulations 2007 (S.I. 2007/717)
- Communications (Television Licensing) (Amendment) Regulations 2007 (S.I. 2007/718)
- Social Security (Miscellaneous Amendments) Regulations 2007 (S.I. 2007/719)
- Plant Health (Plant Passport Fees) (England) Regulations 2007 (S.I. 2007/720)
- Protection of Wrecks (Designation) (England) (No. 2) Order 2007 (S.I. 2007/721)
- Childcare (Supply and Disclosure of Information) (England) Regulations 2007 (S.I. 2007/722)
- Childcare (Disqualification) Regulations 2007 (S.I. 2007/723)
- Licensing Act 2003 (Consequential Amendment) (Non-Domestic Rating) (Public Houses in England) Order 2007 (S.I. 2007/724)
- National Assistance (Sums for Personal Requirements and Assessment of Resources) Amendment (England) Regulations 2007 (S.I. 2007/725)
- Government of Wales Act 2006 (Transitional Provisions) (Finance) Order 2007 (S.I. 2007/726)
- Water Resources Management Plan Regulations 2007 (S.I. 2007/727)
- Local Inquiries, Qualifying Inquiries and Qualifying Procedures (Standard Daily Amount) (Wales) Regulations 2007 (S.I. 2007/728)
- Court Funds (Amendment) Rules 2007 (S.I. 2007/729)
- Childcare (Voluntary Registration) Regulations 2007 (S.I. 2007/730)
- Income-related Benefits (Subsidy to Authorities) Amendment Order 2007 (S.I. 2007/731)
- Companies (EEA State) Regulations 2007 (S.I. 2007/732)
- Children and Adoption Act 2006 (Commencement No. 1) (Wales) Order 2007 (S.I. 2007/733)
- Rules of the Air Regulations 2007 (S.I. 2007/734)
- Fire and Rescue Services (Emergencies) (England) Order 2007 (S.I. 2007/735)
- Children (Performances) (Amendment) (Wales) Regulations 2007 (S.I. 2007/736)
- Norfolk (Coroners' Districts) Order 2007 (S.I. 2007/737)
- Environmental Offences (Fixed Penalties) (Miscellaneous Provisions) (Wales) Regulations 2007 (S.I. 2007/739)
- Tuberculosis (England) Order 2007 (S.I. 2007/740)
- Sex Discrimination Code of Practice (Public Authorities) (Duty to Promote Equality) (Appointed Day) Order 2007 (S.I. 2007/741)
- Legal Aid in Family Proceedings (Remuneration) (Amendment) Regulations 2007 (S.I. 2007/742)
- National Lottery etc. Act 1993 (Amendment of Section 23) Order 2007 (S.I. 2007/743)
- British Citizenship (Designated Service) (Amendment) Order 2007 (S.I. 2007/744)
- Smoke-free (Vehicle Operators and Penalty Notices) Regulations 2007 (S.I. 2007/760)
- Financial Services and Markets Act 2000 (Markets in Financial Instruments) (Amendment) Regulations 2007 (S.I. 2007/763)
- Smoke-free (Penalties and Discounted Amounts) Regulations 2007 (S.I. 2007/764)
- Smoke-free (Exemptions and Vehicles) Regulations 2007 (S.I. 2007/765)
- Transfer of the Northern Ireland Water Service (Tax) Regulations 2007 (S.I. 2007/766)
- Children and Young Persons (Sale of Tobacco etc.) Order 2007 S.I. 2007/767)
- Value Added Tax (Amendment) (No.2) Regulations 2007 (S.I. 2007/768)
- Social Security (Industrial Injuries) (Dependency) (Permitted Earnings Limits) Order 2007 (S.I. 2007/769)
- Research Councils (Transfer of Property etc.) Order 2007 (S.I. 2007/770)
- Pension Protection Fund (Waiver of Pension Protection Levy and Consequential Amendments) Regulations 2007 (S.I. 2007/771)
- Planning etc. (Scotland) Act 2006 (Business Improvement Districts Levy) Order 2007 (S.I. 2007/772)
- Discharge of Fines by Unpaid Work (Pilot Schemes) (Amendment) Order 2007 (S.I. 2007/773)
- Children (Allocation of Proceedings) (Amendment) Order 2007 (S.I. 2007/774)
- Social Security Benefits Up-rating Regulations 2007 (S.I. 2007/775)
- Social Security Pensions (Low Earnings Threshold) Order 2007 (S.I. 2007/776)
- Criminal Defence Service (Financial Eligibility) (Amendment) Regulations 2007 (S.I. 2007/777)
- Student Fees (Qualifying Courses and Persons) (England) Regulations 2007 (S.I. 2007/778)
- Education (Fees and Awards) (England) Regulations 2007 (S.I. 2007/779)
- Criminal Defence Service (General) (No. 2) (Amendment) Regulations 2007 (S.I. 2007/780)
- Social Security Revaluation of Earnings Factors Order 2007 (S.I. 2007/781)
- Pension Protection Fund (Miscellaneous Amendments) Regulations 2007 (S.I. 2007/782)
- Town and Country Planning (Control of Advertisements) (England) Regulations 2007 (S.I. 2007/783)
- Housing (Right to Buy) (Prescribed Forms) (Amendment) (England) Regulations 2007 (S.I. 2007/784)
- National Insurance Contributions (Application of Part 7 of the Finance Act 2004) Regulations 2007 (S.I. 2007/785)
- Civil Courts (Amendment) Order 2007 (S.I. 2007/786)
- Smoke-free Premises etc. (Wales) Regulations 2007 787)
- Plant Health (Import Inspection Fees) (England) (Amendment) Regulations 2007 (S.I. 2007/788)
- Charities Act 2006 (Interim changes in threshold for registration of small charities) Order 2007 (S.I. 2007/789)
- Ticket Touting (Designation of Football Matches) Order 2007 (S.I. 2007/790)
- Private Security Industry (Licence Fees) Order 2007 (S.I. 2007/791)
- Employee Share Schemes (Electronic Communication of Returns and Information) Regulations 2007 (S.I. 2007/792)
- Registered Pension Schemes (Splitting of Schemes) (Amendment) Regulations 2007 (S.I. 2007/793)
- Authorised Investment Funds (Tax) (Amendment No. 2) Regulations 2007 794)
- Social Security Contributions and Benefits (Northern Ireland) Act 1992 (Modification of Section 10(7B)) Regulations 2007 (S.I. 2007/795)
- Housing (Tenancy Deposit Schemes) Order 2007 (S.I. 2007/796)
- Housing (Tenancy Deposits) (Prescribed Information) Order 2007 (S.I. 2007/797)
- Housing (Tenancy Deposits) (Specified Interest Rate) Order 2007 (S.I. 2007/798)
- Social Security Contributions and Benefits Act 1992 (Modification of Section 10(7B)) Regulations 2007 (S.I. 2007/799)
- Financial Services and Markets Act 2000 (Collective Investment Schemes) (Amendment) Order 2007 (S.I. 2007/800)

== 801–900 ==
- Pensions Increase (Review) Order 2007 (S.I. 2007/801)
- Pensions Increase (Pension Schemes for Kenneth Macdonald) Regulations 2007 (S.I. 2007/802)
- Medicines for Human Use and Medical Devices (Fees Amendments) (No.2) Regulations 2007 (S.I. 2007/803)
- Workmen's Compensation (Supplementation) (Amendment) Scheme 2007 (S.I. 2007/804)
- Licensing Act 2003 (Welsh Language Forms) Order 2007 (S.I. 2007/805)
- Local Authorities (Alcohol Consumption in Designated Public Places) Regulations 2007 (S.I. 2007/806)
- Immigration and Nationality (Fees) Order 2007 (S.I. 2007/807)
- Private Security Industry Act 2001 (Approved Contractor Scheme) Regulations 2007 (S.I. 2007/808)
- Undersized Bass Order 2007 (S.I. 2007/809)
- Private Security Industry Act 2001 (Licences) Regulations 2007 (S.I. 2007/810)
- Social Security (Industrial Injuries) (Prescribed Diseases) Amendment Regulations 2007 (S.I. 2007/811)
- General Teaching Council for Wales (Constitution) (Amendment) Regulations 2007 (S.I. 2007/812)
- Occupational and Personal Pension Schemes (Miscellaneous Amendments) Regulations 2007 (S.I. 2007/814)
- Natural Environment and Rural Communities Act 2006 (Commencement No. 4) Order 2007 (S.I. 2007/816)
- Tax Credits (Miscellaneous Amendments) Regulations 2007 (S.I. 2007/824)
- Employment Equality (Age) (Consequential Amendments) Regulations 2007 (S.I. 2007/825)
- Registered Pension Schemes (Bridging Pensions) Regulations 2007 (S.I. 2007/826)
- Consumer Credit (Advertisements) (Amendment) Regulations 2007 (S.I. 2007/827)
- Tax Credits Up-rating Regulations 2007 (S.I. 2007/828)
- Taxation of Pension Schemes (Protected Rights and Pension Commencement Lump Sums) (Amendment) Order 2007 (S.I. 2007/829)
- Credit Institutions (Reorganisation and Winding Up) (Amendment) Regulations 2007 (S.I. 2007/830)
- Energy-Saving Items Regulations 2007 (S.I. 2007/831)
- Financial Markets and Insolvency (Settlement Finality) (Amendment) Regulations 2007 (S.I. 2007/832)
- Mental Capacity Act 2005 (Appropriate Body) (Wales) Regulations 2007 (S.I. 2007/833)
- Pension Protection Fund (Contributions Equivalent Premium) Regulations 2007 (S.I. 2007/834)
- Asylum and Immigration Tribunal (Procedure) (Amendment) Rules 2007 (S.I. 2007/835)
- National Health Service Trusts (Originating Capital) Order 2007 (S.I. 2007/836)
- Mental Capacity Act 2005 (Loss of Capacity during Research Project) (Wales) Regulations 2007 (S.I. 2007/837)
- Registered Pension Schemes (Block Transfers) (Permitted Membership Period) (Amendment) Regulations 2007 (S.I. 2007/838)
- Gender Recognition (Application Fees) (Amendment) Order 2007 (S.I. 2007/839)
- Contaminants in Food (Wales) Regulations 2007 (S.I. 2007/840)
- Electricity Generating Stations and Overhead Lines (Inquiries Procedure) (England and Wales) Rules 2007 (S.I. 2007/841)
- Cattle Identification (Wales) Regulations 2007 (S.I. 2007/842)
- Meat (Official Controls Charges) (Wales) Regulations 2007 (S.I. 2007/843)
- Dairy Produce Quotas (Wales) (Amendment) Regulations 2007 (S.I. 2007/844)
- Asylum and Immigration (Treatment of Claimants, etc.) Act 2004 (Commencement No. 1) (Northern Ireland) Order 2007 (S.I. 2007/845)
- Financial Services and Markets Act 2000 (Administration Orders Relating to Insurers)(Northern Ireland) Order 2007 (S.I. 2007/846)
- Wireless Telegraphy (Licence Award) (Amendment) Regulations 2007 (S.I. 2007/847)
- Government of Wales Act 2006 (Designation of Receipts) Order 2007 (S.I. 2007/848)
- Income Tax (Qualifying Child Care) Regulations 2007 (S.I. 2007/849)
- Tonnage Tax (Exception of Financial Year 2007) Order 2007 (S.I. 2007/850)
- Insurers (Reorganisation and Winding Up) (Amendment) Regulations 2007 (S.I. 2007/851)
- Mental Capacity Act 2005 (Independent Mental Capacity Advocates) (Wales) Regulations 2007 (S.I. 2007/852)
- Road Transport (Working Time) (Amendment) Regulations 2007 (S.I. 2007/853)
- Further Education Corporations (Publication of Draft Orders) (Wales) Regulations 2007 (S.I. 2007/854)
- Motor Vehicles (EC Type Approval) (Amendment) Regulations 2007 (S.I. 2007/855)
- Mental Capacity Act 2005 (Commencement) (Wales) Order 2007 (S.I. 2007/856)
- Undersized Bass (Revocation) Order 2007 (S.I. 2007/857)
- Violent Crime Reduction Act 2006 (Commencement No. 2) Order 2007 (S.I. 2007/858)
- Building Societies (Accounts and Related Provisions) (Amendment) Regulations 2007 (S.I. 2007/859)
- Building Societies Act 1986 (Substitution of Specified Amounts and Modification of the Funding Limit Calculation) Order 2007 (S.I. 2007/860)
- East London and The City Mental Health National Health Service Trust (Change of Name) (Establishment) Amendment Order 2007 (S.I. 2007/861)
- Parsonages Measure (Amendment) Rules 2007 (S.I. 2007/862)
- Asylum Support (Amendment) Regulations 2007 (S.I. 2007/863)
- Diseases of Fish (England and Wales) Order 2007 (S.I. 2007/864)
- Pension Protection Fund (Closed Schemes) Regulations 2007 (S.I. 2007/865)
- Lottery Duty (Amendment) Regulations 2007 (S.I. 2007/870)
- Producer Responsibility Obligations (Packaging Waste) Regulations 2007 (S.I. 2007/871)
- Hallmarking Act 1973 (Amendment) Regulations 2007 (S.I. 2007/872)
- Hallmarking Act 1973 (Exemption) (Amendment) Order 2007 (S.I. 2007/880)
- Orders for the Delivery of Documents (Procedure) (Amendment) Regulations 2007 (S.I. 2007/881)
- Immigration (Leave to Remain) (Prescribed Forms and Procedures) Regulations 2007 (S.I. 2007/882)
- A66 Trunk Road (South Stockton Link Slip Roads) (Trunking) Order 2007 (S.I. 2007/885)
- Nursing and Midwifery Council (Fitness to Practise) (Amendment) Rules Order of Council 2007 (S.I. 2007/893)

== 901–1000 ==
- Environmental Offences (Use of Fixed Penalty Receipts) Regulations 2007 (S.I. 2007/901)
- Community Legal Service (Financial) (Amendment) Regulations 2007 (S.I. 2007/906)
- Education (Chief Inspector of Education and Training in Wales) Order 2007 (S.I. 2007/907)
- Service Departments Registers (Amendment) Order 2007 (S.I. 2007/908)
- Naval, Military and Air Forces Etc. (Disablement and Death) Service Pensions (Amendment) Order 2007 (S.I. 2007/909)
- National Assembly for Wales (Legislative Competence) (Conversion of Framework Powers) Order 2007 (S.I. 2007/910)
- Northern Ireland Policing Board (Northern Ireland) Order 2007 (S.I. 2007/911)
- Policing (Miscellaneous Provisions) (Northern Ireland) Order 2007 (S.I. 2007/912)
- Electricity (Single Wholesale Market) (Northern Ireland) Order 2007 (S.I. 2007/913)
- Budget (Northern Ireland) Order 2007 (S.I. 2007/914)
- Foyle and Carlingford Fisheries (Northern Ireland) Order 2007 (S.I. 2007/915)
- Road Traffic (Northern Ireland) Order 2007 (S.I. 2007/916)
- Health and Social Care (Community Health and Standards) Act 2003 Consequential Provisions (Recovery of NHS Charges) Order 2007 (S.I. 2007/917)
- Compensation Act 2006 (Commencement No. 3) Order 2007 (S.I. 2007/922)
- Smoke-free (Signs) Regulations 2007 (S.I. 2007/923)
- Employment Zones (Amendment) Regulations 2007 (S.I. 2007/924)
- Representation of the People (Scotland) (Amendment) Regulations 2007 (S.I. 2007/925)
- Part 7 of the Anti-terrorism, Crime and Security Act 2001 (Extension to Animal Pathogens) Order 2007 (S.I. 2007/926)
- Sea Fishing (Restriction on Days at Sea) Order 2007 (S.I. 2007/927)
- Accession (Immigration and Worker Registration) (Amendment) Regulations 2007 (S.I. 2007/928)
- Schedule 5 to the Anti-terrorism, Crime and Security Act 2001 (Modification) Order 2007 (S.I. 2007/929)
- Serious Organised Crime and Police Act 2005 (Designated Sites under Section 128) Order 2007 (S.I. 2007/930)
- Local Electoral Administration and Registration Services (Scotland) Act 2006 (Consequential Provisions and Modifications) Order 2007 (S.I. 2007/931)
- Security of Animal Pathogens (Exceptions to Dangerous Substances) Regulations 2007 (S.I. 2007/932)
- Offshore Petroleum Production and Pipe-lines (Assessment of Environmental Effects) (Amendment) Regulations 2007 (S.I. 2007/933)
- Regulation of Investigatory Powers (Authorisations Extending to Scotland) Order 2007 (S.I. 2007/934)
- Education and Inspections Act 2006 (Commencement No. 3 and Transitional Provisions and Savings) Order 2007 (S.I. 2007/935)
- Immigration and Nationality (Cost Recovery Fees) Regulations 2007 (S.I. 2007/936)
- Scottish Parliament (Elections etc.) Order 2007 (S.I. 2007/937)
- Offshore Combustion Installations (Prevention and Control of Pollution) (Amendment) Regulations 2007 (S.I. 2007/938)
- Value Added Tax (Amendment of section 77A of the Value Added Tax Act 1994) Order 2007 (S.I. 2007/939)
- Income Tax Act 2007 (Amendment) Order 2007 (S.I. 2007/940)
- Value Added Tax (Increase of Registration Limits) Order 2007 (S.I. 2007/941)
- Capital Gains Tax (Annual Exempt Amount) Order 2007 (S.I. 2007/942)
- Income Tax (Indexation) Order 2007 (S.I. 2007/943)
- Staffing of Maintained Schools (Miscellaneous Amendments) (Wales) Regulations 2007 (S.I. 2007/944)
- Business Premises Renovation Allowances Regulations 2007 (S.I. 2007/945)
- Finance (No. 2) Act 2005, Section 2(7), (Appointed Day) Order 2007 (S.I. 2007/946)
- Independent Schools (Miscellaneous Amendments) (Wales) Regulations 2007 (S.I. 2007/947)
- Loan Relationships and Derivative Contracts (Disregard and Bringing into Account of Profits and Losses) (Amendment) Regulations 2007 (S.I. 2007/948)
- Finance Act 2005, Section 92 and Schedule 6, (Appointed Day) Order 2007 (S.I. 2007/949)
- Loan Relationships and Derivative Contracts (Change of Accounting Practice) (Amendment) Regulations 2007 (S.I. 2007/950)
- Local Authorities (Executive Arrangements) (Decisions, Documents and Meetings) and the Standards Committees (Wales) (Amendment) Regulations 2007 (S.I. 2007/951)
- Planning and Compulsory Purchase Act 2004 (Commencement No.4 and Consequential, Transitional and Savings Provisions) (Wales) (Amendment No.2) Order 2007 (S.I. 2007/952)
- Local Health Boards (Constitution, Membership and Procedures) (Wales) (Amendment) Regulations 2007 (S.I. 2007/953)
- Avian Influenza (Fees for the Licensed Vaccination of Birds) (England) Regulations 2007 (S.I. 2007/954)
- A590 Trunk Road in the District of Barrow-in-Furness (From Junction with A5087 Hindpool Road to Junction with C6011 Park Road) (Detrunking) Order 2007 (S.I. 2007/955)
- School Governance (Constitution) (England) Regulations 2007 (S.I. 2007/957)
- School Governance (New Schools) (England) Regulations 2007 (S.I. 2007/958)
- School Governance (Procedures) (England) (Amendment) Regulations 2007 (S.I. 2007/959)
- School Governance (Federations) (England) Regulations 2007 (S.I. 2007/960)
- References to Health Authorities Order 2007 (S.I. 2007/961)
- Post Office Network Subsidy Scheme Order 2007 (S.I. 2007/962)
- Finance Act 1995, Section 127(12), (Designated Transactions) Regulations 2007 (S.I. 2007/963)
- Finance Act 2003, Paragraph 3(3) of Schedule 26, (Designated Transactions) Regulations 2007 (S.I. 2007/964)
- Landfill Tax (Amendment) Regulations 2007 (S.I. 2007/965)
- Value Added Tax (Consideration for Fuel Provided for Private Use) Order 2007 (S.I. 2007/966)
- Constitutional Reform Act 2005 (Commencement No. 7) Order 2007 (S.I. 2007/967)
- Working Tax Credit (Entitlement and Maximum Rate) (Amendment) Regulations 2007 (S.I. 2007/968)
- Local Government (Access to Information) (Variation) (Wales) Order 2007 (S.I. 2007/969)
- Common Agricultural Policy Single Payment and Support Schemes (Cross-compliance) (Wales) (Amendment) Regulations 2007 (S.I. 2007/970)
- Pesticides (Maximum Residue Levels in Crops, Food and Feeding Stuffs) (England and Wales) (Amendment) Regulations 2007 (S.I. 2007/971)
- Designation of Schools Having a Religious Character (Wales) Order 2007 (S.I. 2007/972)
- National Health Service (Travel Expenses and Remission of Charges) Amendment Regulations 2007 (S.I. 2007/988)
- Pension Protection Fund (Pension Compensation Cap) Order 2007 (S.I. 2007/989)
- Electricity Act 1989 (Exemption from the Requirement for a Generation Licence) (Gunfleet Sand) (England and Wales) Order 2007 (S.I. 2007/990)
- Energy Performance of Buildings (Certificates and Inspections) (England and Wales) Regulations 2007 (S.I. 2007/991)
- Home Information Pack Regulations 2007 (S.I. 2007/992)
- Electricity Act 1989 (Exemption from the Requirement for a Generation Licence) (Burbo Bank) (England and Wales) Order 2007 (S.I. 2007/993)
- Occupational Pension Schemes (Levies) (Amendment) Regulations 2007 (S.I. 2007/994)

== 1001–1100 ==
- Occupational Pension Schemes (Levy Ceiling) Order 2007 (S.I. 2007/1012)
- Local Elections (Communities) (Welsh Forms) Order 2007 (S.I. 2007/1013)
- Parliamentary Elections (Welsh Forms) Order 2007 (S.I. 2007/1014)
- Local Elections (Principal Areas) (Welsh Forms) Order 2007 (S.I. 2007/1015)
- Northern Ireland Act 2000 (Restoration of Devolved Government) Order 2007 (S.I. 2007/1016)
- Offshore Installations (Safety Zones) (No. 2) Order 2007 (S.I. 2007/1017)
- Road Vehicles (Registration and Licensing) (Amendment) (No. 2) Regulations 2007 (S.I. 2007/1018)
- Childcare Act 2006 (Commencement No. 2 and Savings and Transitional Provisions) Order 2007 (S.I. 2007/1019)
- Transport of Animals (Cleansing and Disinfection) (England) (No. 3) (Amendment) Order 2007 (S.I. 2007/1020)
- Water Act 2003 (Commencement No. 7 and Transitional Provisions) Order 2007S.I. 2007/1021)
- Courts Boards Areas (Amendment) Order 2007 (S.I. 2007/1022)
- Planning and Compulsory Purchase Act 2004 (Commencement No. 4 and Consequential, Transitional and Savings Provisions) (Wales) (Amendment No. 2) Order 2007 (S.I. 2007/1023)
- Local Authorities (Mayoral Elections) (England and Wales) Regulations 2007 (S.I. 2007/1024)
- Representation of the People (England and Wales) and the Representation of the People (Combination of Polls) (England and Wales) (Amendment) Regulations 2007 (S.I. 2007/1025)
- National Health Service (General Ophthalmic Services) (Amendment) (Wales) (No. 2) Regulations 2007 (S.I. 2007/1026)
- Welfare of Animals (Miscellaneous Revocations) (Wales) Regulations 2007 (S.I. 2007/1027)
- Docking of Working Dogs' Tails (Wales) Regulations 2007 (S.I. 2007/1028)
- Mutilations (Permitted Procedures) (Wales) Regulations 2007 (S.I. 2007/S.I. 2007/1029)
- Animal Welfare Act 2006 (Commencement No. 1) (Wales) Order 2007 (S.I. 2007/1030)
- Insurance Companies (Corporation Tax Acts) (Amendment) Order 2007 (S.I. 2007/1031)
- Commons Registration (General) (Amendment) (England) Regulations 2007 (S.I. 2007/1032)
- Social Security (Work-focused Interviews for Lone Parents) Amendment Regulations 2007 (S.I. 2007/1034)
- Crime and Disorder Act 1998 (Responsible Authorities) Order 2007 (S.I. 2007/1035)
- Religion or Belief (Questions and Replies) Order 2007 (S.I. 2007/1038)
- National Health Service (Optical Charges and Payments) (Amendment) (Wales) Regulations 2007 (S.I. 2007/1039)
- Notification of Marketing of Food for Particular Nutritional Uses (Wales) Regulations 2007 (S.I. 2007/1040)
- National Assistance (Assessment of Resources and Sums for Personal Requirements) (Amendments) (Wales) Regulations 2007 (S.I. 2007/1041)
- Health, Social Care and Well-being Strategies (Wales) (Amendment) Regulations 2007 (S.I. 2007/1042)
- Road Traffic (Permitted Parking Area and Special Parking Area) (County of the Isle of Anglesey) Order 2007 (S.I. 2007/1043)
- Animals and Animal Products (Import and Export) (England) (Imports of Captive Birds) Regulations 2007 (S.I. 2007/1044)
- Assembly Learning Grants and Loans (Higher Education) (Wales) Regulations 2007 (S.I. 2007/1045)
- Cattle Identification (Amendment) Regulations 2007 (S.I. 2007/1046)
- Welfare of Animals (Transport) (Wales) Order 2007 (S.I. 2007/1047)
- National Health Service (Optical Charges and Payments) (Amendment) (Wales) (No. 2) Regulations 2007 (S.I. 2007/1048)
- Children's Commissioner for Wales (Appointment) (Amendment) Regulations 2007 (S.I. 2007/1049)
- Corporation Tax (Taxation of Films) (Transitional Provisions) Regulations 2007 (S.I. 2007/1050)
- Local Authorities (Capital Finance and Accounting) (Wales) (Amendment) Regulations 2007 (S.I. 2007/1051)
- Social Security (Contributions) (Re-rating and National Insurance Funds Payments) Order 2007 (S.I. 2007/1052)
- Child Benefit Up-rating Order 2007 (S.I. 2007/1053)
- Guardian's Allowance Up-rating Order 2007 (S.I. 2007/1054)
- Guardian's Allowance Up-rating (Northern Ireland) Order 2007 (S.I. 2007/1055)
- Social Security Contributions (Consequential Provisions) Regulations 2007 (S.I. 2007/1056)
- Social Security (Contributions) (Amendment No. 2) Regulations 2007 (S.I. 2007/1057)
- Highways (Environmental Impact Assessment) Regulations 2007 (S.I. 2007/1062)
- Childcare (Provision of Information) (England) Regulations 2007 (S.I. 2007/1063)
- London Olympic Games and Paralympic Games Act 2006 (Commencement No. 2) Order 2007 (S.I. 2007/1064)
- Education (Information About Children in Alternative Provision) (England) Regulations 2007 (S.I. 2007/1065)
- Atomic Weapons Establishment (AWE) Aldermaston Byelaws 2007 (S.I. 2007/1066)
- Environmental Impact Assessment and Natural Habitats (Extraction of Minerals by Marine Dredging) (England and Northern Ireland) Regulations 2007 (S.I. 2007/1067)
- Housing Act 2004 (Commencement No. 7) (England) Order 2007 (S.I. 2007/1068)
- Education (Pupil Referral Units) (Application of Enactments) (Wales) Regulations 2007 (S.I. 2007/1069)
- Housing Act 2004 (Commencement No. 7) (England) Order 2007 (S.I. 2007/1070)
- Guardian's Allowance Up-rating Regulations 2007 (S.I. 2007/1071)
- Firefighters' Pension Scheme (Wales) Order 2007 (S.I. 2007/1072)
- Firefighters' Compensation Scheme (Wales) Order 2007 (S.I. 2007/1073)
- Firefighters' Pension Scheme (Wales) (Amendment) Order 2007 (S.I. 2007/1074)
- Fire and Rescue National Framework (Wales) 2005 (Revisions) Order 2007 (S.I. 2007/1075)
- Food Supplements (Wales) (Amendment) Regulations 2007 (S.I. 2007/1076)
- Income Tax (Pay as You Earn) (Amendment) Regulations 2007 (S.I. 2007/1077)
- Renewables Obligation Order 2006 (Amendment) Order 2007 (S.I. 2007/1078)
- Criminal Justice Act 2003 (Surcharge)(No. 2) Order 2007 (S.I. 2007/1079)
- Animals and Animal Products (Import and Export) (Wales) (Imports of Captive Birds) Regulations 2007 (S.I. 2007/1080)
- Finance Act 2006 (Section 94(5)) (PAYE: Retrospective Notional Payments — Appointment of Substituted Date) Order 2007 (S.I. 2007/1081)
- Jobseeker's Allowance (Jobseeker Mandatory Activity) Pilot Regulations 2007 (S.I. 2007/1082)
- Financial Services and Markets Act 2000 (Financial Promotion) (Amendment) Order 2007 (S.I. 2007/1083)
- Home-Grown Cereals Authority (Rate of Levy) Order 2007 (S.I. 2007/1084)
- Waste Electrical and Electronic Equipment (Waste Management Licensing) (England and Wales) (Amendment) Regulations 2007 (S.I. 2007/1085)
- Local Authorities (Allowances for Members) (Wales) Regulations 2007 (S.I. 2007/1086)
- Education (Independent School Standards) (England) (Amendment) Regulations 2007 (S.I. 2007/1087)
- Education (Non-Maintained Special Schools) (England) (Amendment) Regulations 2007 (S.I. 2007/1088)
- Education (Investigation of Parents' Complaints) (England) Regulations 2007 (S.I. 2007/1089)
- Compensation (Exemptions) (Amendment) (No. 1) Order 2007 (S.I. 2007/1090)
- Energy Act 2004 (Commencement No. 8) Order 2007 (S.I. 2007/1091)
- Equality Act 2006 (Commencement No. 2) Order 2007 (S.I. 2007/1092)
- Companies Act 2006 (Commencement No. 2, Consequential Amendments, Transitional Provisions and Savings) Order 2007 (S.I. 2007/1093)
- Social Security (Contributions) (Re-rating) Consequential Amendment Regulations 2007 (S.I. 2007/1094)
- Common Investment (Amendment) Scheme 2007 (S.I. 2007/1095)
- Greenhouse Gas Emissions Trading Scheme (Miscellaneous Provisions) Regulations 2007 (S.I. 2007/1096)
- Stamp Duty and Stamp Duty Reserve Tax (Investment Exchanges and Clearing Houses) (Eurex Clearing AG) Regulations 2007 (S.I. 2007/1097)
- Police, Public Order and Criminal Justice (Scotland) Act 2006 (Consequential Provisions and Modifications) Order 2007 (S.I. 2007/1098)
- Children (Allocation of Proceedings) (Amendment No. 2) Order 2007 (S.I. 2007/1099)
- Mutilations (Permitted Procedures) (England) Regulations 2007 (S.I. 2007/1100)

== 1101–1200 ==
- Welfare of Animals (Miscellaneous Revocations) (England) Regulations 2007 (S.I. 2007/1101)
- Health and Social Care (Community Health and Standards) Act 2003 Commencement (No. 3) (Amendment) Order 2007 (S.I. 2007/1102)
- Tourist Boards (Scotland) Act 2006 (Consequential Modifications) Order 2007 (S.I. 2007/1103)
- National Health Service (Travelling Expenses and Remission of Charges) (Wales) Regulations 2007 (S.I. 2007/S.I. 2007/1104)
- Immigration, Asylum and Nationality Act 2006 (Commencement No. 6) Order 2007 (S.I. 2007/1109)
- National Health Service (Pharmaceutical Services) (Remuneration for Persons providing Pharmaceutical Services) (Amendment) (Wales) Regulations 2007 (S.I. 2007/1112)
- Air Navigation (Isle of Man) Order 2007 (S.I. 2007/1115)
- Parliamentary Copyright (National Assembly for Wales) Order 2007 (S.I. 2007/1116)
- National Assembly for Wales (Diversion of Functions) Order 2007 (S.I. 2007/1117)
- National Assembly for Wales Commission (Crown Status) Order 2007 (S.I. 2007/1118)
- Inspectors of Education, Children's Services and Skills Order 2007 (S.I. 2007/1119)
- Docking of Working Dogs' Tails (England) Regulations 2007 (S.I. 2007/1020)
- Constitutional Reform Act 2005 (Commencement No. 8) Order 2007 (S.I. 2007/1121)
- Immigration (Leave to Remain) (Prescribed Forms and Procedures) (Amendment) Regulations 2007 (S.I. 2007/1122)
- Social Security, Occupational Pension Schemes and Statutory Payments (Consequential Provisions) Regulations 2007 (S.I. 2007/1154)
- Gambling Act 2005 (Commencement and Transitional Provisions) (Amendment) Order 2007 (S.I. 2007/1157)
- Immigration and Nationality (Fees) Regulations 2007 (S.I. 2007/1158)
- Local Authorities (Model Code of Conduct) Order 2007 (S.I. 2007/1159)
- Police (Amendment) Regulations 2007 (S.I. 2007/1160)
- Motor Vehicles (Tests) (Amendment) (No. 2) Regulations 2007 (S.I. 2007/1161)
- Police (Fingerprints) Regulations 2007 (S.I. 2007/1162)
- Northern Ireland Act 2000 (Modification) Order 2007 (S.I. 2007/1163)
- Cumbria (Coroners' Districts) Order 2007 (S.I. 2007/1165)
- Local Government Pension Scheme (Benefits, Membership and Contributions) Regulations 2007 (S.I. 2007/1166)
- Consumer Credit (Information Requirements and Duration of Licences and Charges) Regulations 2007 (S.I. 2007/1167)
- Consumer Credit (Exempt Agreements) Order 2007 (S.I. 2007/1168)
- National Assembly for Wales (Transfer of staff to Assembly Commission Scheme) Order 2007 (S.I. 2007/1169)
- Her Majesty's Inspectors of Constabulary (Specified Organisations) Order 2007 (S.I. 2007/1170)
- Government of Wales Act 2006 (Transitional Provisions) (Assembly General Subordinate Legislation) Order 2007 (S.I. 2007/1171)
- Her Majesty's Inspectorate of the National Probation Service for England and Wales (Specified Organisations) Order 2007 (S.I. 2007/1172)
- Her Majesty's Chief Inspector of Prisons (Specified Organisations) Order 2007 (S.I. 2007/1173)
- Criminal Defence Service (Funding) Order 2007 (S.I. 2007/1174)
- Social Security (Contributions) (Amendment No. 3) Regulations 2007 (S.I. 2007/1175)
- Majesty's Inspectorate of Court Administration (Specified Organisations) Order 2007 (S.I. 2007/1176)
- Justices of the Peace (Training and Appraisal) (Amendment) Rules 2007 (S.I. 2007/1177)
- Learning and Skills Council for England (Supplementary Functions) Order 2007 (S.I. 2007/1178)
- Health Act 1999 (Commencement No. 16) Order 2007 (S.I. 2007/1179)
- Dissolution of the Post Office Order 2007 (S.I. 2007/1180)
- Postal Services Act 2000 (Commencement No. 5) Order 2007 (S.I. 2007/1181)
- Government of Wales Act 2006 (Local Government (Contracts) Act 1997) (Modifications) Order 2007 (S.I. 2007/1182)
- Flexible Working (Eligibility, Complaints and Remedies) (Amendment) Regulations 2007 (S.I. 2007/1184)
- Derwentside (Parish) Order 2007 (S.I. 2007/1185)

== 1201–1300 ==
- NHS Business Services Authority (Awdurdod Gwasanaethau Busnes y GIG) (Establishment and Constitution) Amendment Order 2007 (S.I. 2007/1201)
- A14 Trunk Road (Haughley New Street to Stowmarket Improvement and Detrunking) Order 2007 (S.I. 2007/1250)
- Constitutional Reform Act 2005 (Commencement No. 9) Order 2007 (S.I. 2007/1252)
- Lasting Powers of Attorney, Enduring Powers of Attorney and Public Guardian Regulations S.I. 2007/1253)
- Commonhold and Leasehold Reform Act 2002 (Commencement No. 6) (England) Order 2007 (S.I. 2007/1256)
- Service Charges (Summary of Rights and Obligations, and Transitional Provision) (England) Regulations 2007 (S.I. 2007/1257)
- Administration Charges (Summary of Rights and Obligations) (England) Regulations 2007 (S.I. 2007/1258)
- Equality Act (Sexual Orientation) Regulations 2007 (S.I. 2007/1263)
- Education (Supply of Information about the School Workforce) (England) Regulations 2007 (S.I. 2007/1264)
- National Savings Bank (Amendment) Regulations 2007 (S.I. 2007/1265)
- North Cumbria Mental Health and Learning Disabilities National Health Service Trust (Change of Name) (Establishment) Amendment Order 2007 (S.I. 2007/1267)
- Primary Care Trusts (Establishment and Dissolution) (England) Amendment Order 2007 (S.I. 2007/1268)
- National Assembly for Wales (Transfer of Property, Rights and Liabilities) Order 2007 (S.I. 2007/1269)
- Government of Wales Act 2006 (Transitional Provisions) Order 2007 (S.I. 2007/1270)
- Education and Inspections Act 2006 (Commencement No. 4 and Transitional Provisions and Amendment) Order 2007 (S.I. 2007/1271)
- Health Professions Council (Registration and Fees) (Amendment) Rules Order of Council 2007 (S.I. 2007/1280)
- Wireless Telegraphy (Radio Frequency Identification Equipment) (Exemption) (Amendment) Regulations 2007 (S.I. 2007/1282)
- Local Authorities (Functions and Responsibilities) (England) (Amendment) Regulations 2007 (S.I. 2007/1284)
- Special Immigration Appeals Commission (Procedure) (Amendment) Rules 2007 (S.I. 2007/1285)
- Proscribed Organisations Appeal Commission (Procedure) Rules 2007 (S.I. 2007/1286)
- School Organisation (Requirements as to Foundations) (England) Regulations 2007 (S.I. 2007/1287)
- School Organisation (Establishment and Discontinuance of Schools) (England) Regulations 2007 (S.I. 2007/1288)
- School Organisation (Prescribed Alterations to Maintained Schools) (England) Regulations 2007 (S.I. 2007/1289)
- Courts-Martial Appeal (Amendment No. 2) Rules 2007 (S.I. 2007/1298)

== 1301–1400 ==
- Education (Excluded Days of Detention) (England) Regulations 2007 (S.I. 2007/1304)
- Tax Credits (Definition and Calculation of Income) (Amendment) Regulations 2007 (S.I. 2007/1305)
- Veterinary Surgery (Artificial Insemination) Order 2007 (S.I. 2007/1315)
- Jobseeker's Allowance (Extension of the Intensive Activity Period) Amendment Regulations 2007 (S.I. 2007/1316)
- Community Legal Service (Asylum and Immigration Appeals) (Amendment) Regulations 2007 (S.I. 2007/1317)
- Legal Aid (Asylum and Immigration Appeals) (Northern Ireland) Regulations 2007 (S.I. 2007/1318)
- Bovine Semen (England) Regulations 2007 (S.I. 2007/1319)
- Health Service Medicines (Information Relating to Sales of Branded Medicines etc.) Regulations 2007 (S.I. 2007/1320)
- Collaboration Arrangements (Maintained Schools and Further Education Bodies) (England) Regulations 2007 (S.I. 2007/1321)
- Capital Expenditure in respect of Voluntary Aided Schools (England) Regulations 2007 (S.I. 2007/1322)
- Transport for London (Knightsbridge Station) Order 2007 (S.I. 2007/1323)
- Firearms (Sentencing) (Transitory Provisions) Order 2007 (S.I. 2007/1324)
- School Organisation (Foundation Special Schools) (Application of Provisions Relating to Foundations) (England) Regulations 2007 (S.I. 2007/1329)
- School Governance (Parent Council) (England) Regulations 2007 (S.I. 2007/1330)
- Social Security, Housing Benefit and Council Tax Benefit (Miscellaneous Amendments) Regulations 2007 (S.I. 2007/1331)
- Health and Safety at Work etc. Act 1974 (Application to Environmentally Hazardous Substances) (Amendment) Regulations 2007 (S.I. 2007/1332)
- Export Control (North Korea) Order 2007 (S.I. 2007/1334)
- Local Probation Boards (Miscellaneous Provisions) (Amendment) Regulations 2007 (S.I. 2007/1335)
- Education (Student Fees, Awards and Support) (Amendment) Regulations 2007 (S.I. 2007/1336)
- Financial Services and Markets Act 2000 (Regulated Activities) (Amendment) Order 2007 (S.I. 2007/1339)
- North Korea (United Nations Measures) (Overseas Territories) (Amendment) Order 2007 (S.I. 2007/1347)
- Veterinary Surgeons' Qualifications (European Recognition) Order 2007 (S.I. 2007/1348)
- European Communities (Designation) (No. 2) Order 2007 (S.I. 2007/1349)
- Naval, Military and Air Forces etc. (Disablement and Death) Service Pensions (Correction of 2004 Uprating) Order 2007 (S.I. 2007/1350)
- Safeguarding Vulnerable Groups (Northern Ireland) Order 2007 (S.I. 2007/1351)
- Inspectors of Education, Children's Services and Skills (No. 2) Order 2007 (S.I. 2007/1352)
- National Assembly for Wales Commission (Crown Status) (No. 2) Order 2007 (S.I. 2007/1353)
- Scottish Parliamentary Elections (Returning Officers' Charges) Order 2007 (S.I. 2007/1354)
- School Organisation (Transitional Provisions) (England) Regulations 2007 (S.I. 2007/1355)
- Housing Benefit (Amendment) Regulations 2007 (S.I. 2007/1356)
- Local Authority Adoption Service (Wales) Regulations 2007 (S.I. 2007/1357)
- Exempt Charities (No. 2) Order 2007 (S.I. 2007/1364)
- Education (School Information) (England) (Amendment) Regulations 2007 (S.I. 2007/1365)
- School Travel (Piloting of Schemes) (England) Regulations 2007 (S.I. 2007/1366)
- School Travel (Pupils with Dual Registration) (England) Regulations 2007 (S.I. 2007/1367)
- Representation of the People (National Assembly for Wales) (Access to Election Documents) Regulations 2007 (S.I. 2007/1368)
- Planning and Compulsory Purchase Act 2004 (Commencement No. 10 and Saving) Order 2007 (S.I. 2007/1369)
- Designation of Schools Having a Religious Character (Independent Schools) (England) Order 2007 (S.I. 2007/1370)
- Rules of the Air (Amendment) Regulations 2007 (S.I. 2007/1371)
- Representation of the People (National Assembly for Wales) (Relevant Registration Officer) Order 2007 (S.I. 2007/1372)
- Iran (European Community Financial Sanctions) Regulations 2007 (S.I. 2007/1374)
- Health Act 2006 (Commencement No. 3) Order 2007 (S.I. 2007/1375)
- Finance Act 2003, Section 66 (Prescribed Statutory Provisions) Order 2007 (S.I. 2007/1385)
- Medical Act 1983 (Qualifying Examinations) Order 2007 (S.I. 2007/1386)
- Serious Organised Crime and Police Act 2005 (Designated Sites under Section 128) (Amendment) Order 2007 (S.I. 2007/1387)
- Government of Wales Act 2006 (Consequential Modifications and Transitional Provisions) Order 2007 (S.I. 2007/1388)
- Serious Organised Crime and Police Act 2005 (Amendment of Section 76(3)) Order 2007 (S.I. 2007/1392)
- Northern Ireland Act 2000 (Restoration of Devolved Government) Order 2007 (S.I. 2007/1397)
- Transfer of State Pensions and Benefits Regulations 2007 (S.I. 2007/1398)

== 1401–1500 ==
- Walkergate Primary School (Change to School Session Times) Order 2007 (S.I. 2007/1408)
- Gambling Act 2005 (Mandatory and Default Conditions) (England and Wales) Regulations 2007 (S.I. 2007/1409)
- Gambling Act 2005 (Exclusion of Children from Track Areas) Order 2007 (S.I. 2007/1410)
- Football Spectators (2007 European Under-21 Championship Control Period) Order 2007 (S.I. 2007/1411)
- Luton and South Bedfordshire Joint Committee Order 2007 (S.I. 2007/1412)
- Local Authority Targets (Well-Being of Young Children) Regulations 2007 (S.I. 2007/1415)
- Hydrocarbon Oil (Marking) (Amendment) Regulations 2007 (S.I. 2007/1416)
- Value Added Tax (Section 55A) (Specified Goods and Excepted Supplies) Order 2007 (S.I. 2007/1417)
- Value Added Tax (Amendment) (No. 3) Regulations 2007 (S.I. 2007/1418)
- Finance Act 2006, section 19, (Appointed Day) Order 2007 (S.I. 2007/1419)
- Value Added Tax (Payments on Account) (Amendment) Order 2007 (S.I. 2007/1420)
- Value Added Tax (Administration, Collection and Enforcement) Order 2007 (S.I. 2007/1421)
- Registration of Births, Deaths and Marriages (Amendment) Regulations 2007 (S.I. 2007/1422)
- Brighton West Pier Harbour Revision Order 2007 (S.I. 2007/1423)
- Motor Vehicles (Compulsory Insurance) Regulations 2007 (S.I. 2007/1426)
- Dangerous Wild Animals Act 1976 (Modification) Order 2007 (S.I. 2007/1437)
- Mersey Docks and Harbour Company (Seaforth River Terminal) Harbour Revision Order 2007 (S.I. 2007/1440)
- Local Authorities (Contracting Out of Anti-social Behaviour Order Functions) (England) Order 2007 (S.I. 2007/1441)
- Armed Forces Act 2006 (Commencement No. 1) Order 2007 (S.I. 2007/1442)
- Public Health (Ships) (Amendment) (England) Regulations 2007 (S.I. 2007/1446)
- Public Health (Aircraft) (Amendment) (England) Regulations 2007 (S.I. 2007/1447)
- Assistants to Justices' Clerks (Amendment) Regulations 2007 (S.I. 2007/1448)
- Marketing of Vegetable Plant Material (England) (Amendment) Regulations 2007 (S.I. 2007/1449)
- Oil Taxation (Nomination Scheme for Disposals) (Amendment) Regulations 2007 (S.I. 2007/1454)
- Citizenship Oath and Pledge (Welsh Language) Order 2007 (S.I. 2007/1484)
- Local Government Pension Scheme (Amendment) (No. 2) Regulations 2007 (S.I. 2007/1488)
- Whole of Government Accounts (Designation of Bodies) Order 2007 (S.I. 2007/1492)
- Countryside and Rights of Way Act 2000 (Commencement No. 12) Order 2007 (S.I. 2007/1493)
- Highways (SSSI Diversion Orders) (England) Regulations 2007 (S.I. 2007/1494)
- Disability Discrimination Code of Practice (Providers of Post 16 Education) (Revocation) Order 2007 (S.I. 2007/1495)
- Disability Discrimination Code of Practice (Providers of Post 16 Education) (Appointed Day) Order 2007 (S.I. 2007/1496)

== 1501–1600 ==
- Education Act 1996 (Amendment of Section 19) (England) Regulations 2007 (S.I. 2007/1507)
- Goods Infringing the Olympics and Paralympics Association Rights (Customs) Regulations 2007 (S.I. 2007/1508)
- Control of Cash (Penalties) Regulations 2007 (S.I. 2007/1509)
- National Health Service (Charges for Drugs and Appliances) Amendment (No. 2) Regulations 2007 (S.I. 2007/1510)
- Road Traffic (Permitted Parking Area and Special Parking Area) (Metropolitan Borough of North Tyneside) Order 2007 (S.I. 2007/1511)
- Bus Lane Contraventions (Approved Local Authorities) (England) (Amendment) (No. 3) Order 2007 (S.I. 2007/1512)
- Marine Works (Environmental Impact Assessment) Regulations 2007 (S.I. 2007/1518)
- Planning and Compulsory Purchase Act 2004 (Corresponding Amendments) Order 2007 (S.I. 2007/1519)
- Road Tunnel Safety Regulations 2007 (S.I. 2007/1520)
- Human Fertilisation and Embryology (Quality and Safety) Regulations 2007 (S.I. 2007/1522)
- Human Tissue (Quality and Safety for Human Application) Regulations 2007 (S.I. 2007/1523)
- Street Litter Control Notices (England) (Amendment) Order 2007 (S.I. 2007/1524)
- Home Information Pack (Revocation) Regulations 2007 (S.I. 2007/1525)
- Export Control (Iran) Order 2007 (S.I. 2007/1526)
- Gambling Act 2005 (Commencement No. 6 and Transitional Provisions) (Amendment) Order 2007 (S.I. 2007/1527)
- Home Information Pack (Redress Scheme) (Revocation) Order 2007 (S.I. 2007/1536)
- Offshore Installations (Safety Zones) (No. 3) Order 2007 (S.I. 2007/1549)
- Electronic Commerce Directive (Terrorism Act 2006) Regulations 2007 (S.I. 2007/1550)
- Commons Registration (General) (Amendment) (England) (Revocation) Regulations 2007 (S.I. 2007/1553)
- St Mary's (Isles of Scilly) Harbour Revision Order 2007 (S.I. 2007/1554)
- Disability Discrimination Act 2005 (Commencement No. 3) Order 2007 (S.I. 2007/1555)
- National Institutions of the Church of England (Transfer of Functions) Order 2007 (S.I. 2007/1556)
- Local Authorities (Functions and Responsibilities) (England) (Amendment) (No. 2) Regulations 2007 (S.I. 2007/1557)
- Local Government Pension Scheme (Amendment) (No. 3) Regulations 2007 (S.I. 2007/1561)
- Carriage of Dangerous Goods and Use of Transportable Pressure Equipment Regulations 2007 (S.I. 2007/1573)
- A404 Trunk Road (Handy Cross Junction Improvement) (Derestriction) Order 2007 (S.I. 2007/1574)
- A404 Trunk Road (Maidenhead Thicket to Handy Cross) (24 Hours Clearway) Order 2007 (S.I. 2007/1575)
- Road Traffic (Permitted Parking Area and Special Parking Area) (County of Leicestershire) Order 2007 (S.I. 2007/1582)
- Road Traffic (Permitted Parking Area and Special Parking Area) (Metropolitan Borough of Gateshead) Order 2007 (S.I. 2007/1583)
- Road Traffic (Permitted Parking Area and Special Parking Area) (South Gloucestershire) Order 2007 (S.I. 2007/1584)
- Bus Lane Contraventions (Approved Local Authorities) (England) (Amendment) (No. 4) Order 2007 (S.I. 2007/1585)
- Safety of Sports Grounds (Designation) Order 2007 (S.I. 2007/1587)
- Railways Pensions Guarantee (Prescribed Persons) Order 2007 (S.I. 2007/1595)
- Controls on Dangerous Substances and Preparations (Amendment) Regulations 2007 (S.I. 2007/1596)
- Sex Discrimination Code of Practice (Public Authorities) (Duty to Promote Equality, Scotland) (Appointed Day) Order 2007 (S.I. 2007/1597)
- Integration Loans for Refugees and Others Regulations 2007 (S.I. 2007/1598)
- Value Added Tax (Amendment) (No. 4) Regulations 2007 (S.I. 2007/1599)
- Pension Schemes (Categories of Country and Requirements for Overseas Pension Schemes and Recognised Overseas Pension Schemes) (Amendment) Regulations 2007 (S.I. 2007/1600)

== 1601–1700 ==
- Value Added Tax (Reduced Rate) Order 2007 (S.I. 2007/1601)
- Asylum and Immigration (Treatment of Claimants, etc.) Act 2004 (Commencement No. 7 and Transitional Provisions) Order 2007 (S.I. 2007/1602)
- Public Health (Aircraft and Ships) (Amendment) (England) Regulations 2007 (S.I. 2007/1603)
- Products of Animal Origin (Third Country Imports) (England) (Amendment) Regulations 2007 (S.I. 2007/1605)
- Motor Fuel (Composition and Content) (Amendment) Regulations 2007 (S.I. 2007/1608)
- Justices of the Peace (Training and Development Committee) Rules 2007 (S.I. 2007/1609)
- Family Proceedings Courts (Constitution of Committees and Right to Preside) Rules 2007 (S.I. 2007/1610)
- Youth Courts (Constitution of Committees and Right to Preside) Rules 2007 (S.I. 2007/1611)
- Representation of the People (Northern Ireland)(Amendment) Regulations 2007 (S.I. 2007/1612)
- Personal Injuries (NHS Charges) (Reviews and Appeals) Amendment Regulations 2007 (S.I. 2007/1613)
- Police and Justice Act 2006 (Commencement No. 3) Order 2007 (S.I. 2007/1614)
- Spreadable Fats (Marketing Standards) (England) (Amendment) Regulations 2007 (S.I. 2007/1615)
- Finance Act 1994, Section 220 (Amendment) Regulations 2007 (S.I. 2007/1616)
- Housing Benefit and Council Tax Benefit (War Pension Disregards) Regulations 2007 (S.I. 2007/1619)
- Animals and Animal Products (Import and Export) (England) (Laboratories, Circuses and Avian Quarantine) Regulations 2007 (S.I. 2007/1621)
- Family Proceedings (Amendment) Rules 2007 (S.I. 2007/1622)
- Cosmetic Products (Safety) (Amendment) Regulations 2007 (S.I. 2007/1623)
- Health Protection Agency (Amendment) Regulations 2007 (S.I. 2007/1624)
- Register of Occupational and Personal Pension Schemes (Amendment) Regulations 2007 (S.I. 2007/1625)
- Social Security (Miscellaneous Amendments) (No. 2) Regulations 2007 (S.I. 2007/1626)
- Animals and Animal Products (Import and Export) (Wales) (Laboratories, Circuses and Avian Quarantine) Regulations 2007 (S.I. 2007/1627)
- Family Proceedings Courts (Matrimonial Proceedings etc.) (Amendment) Rules 2007 (S.I. 2007/1628)
- Education (Mandatory Awards) (Amendment) Regulations 2007 (S.I. 2007/1629)
- Education (Student Loans) (Amendment) (England and Wales) Regulations 2007 (S.I. 2007/1630)
- Addition of Vitamins, Minerals and Other Substances (England) Regulations 2007 (S.I. 2007/1631)
- Social Security (Students and Income-related Benefits) Amendment Regulations 2007 (S.I. 2007/1632)
- Biofuels and Other Fuel Substitutes (Payment of Excise Duties etc.) (Amendment) Regulations 2007 (S.I. 2007/1640)
- Civil Jurisdiction and Judgments Regulations 2007 (S.I. 2007/1655)
- Home Information Pack (No. 2) Regulations 2007 (S.I. 2007/1667)
- Housing Act 2004 (Commencement No. 8) (England and Wales) Order 2007 (S.I. 2007/1668)
- Energy Performance of Buildings (Certificates and Inspections) (England and Wales) (Amendment) Regulations 2007 (S.I. 2007/1669)
- Financial Assistance for Environmental Purposes Order 2007 (S.I. 2007/1671)
- Health and Safety (Fees) (Amendment) Regulations 2007 (S.I. 2007/1672)
- Technology Strategy Board (Transfer of Property etc.) Order 2007 (S.I. 2007/1676)
- Virgin Islands Constitution Order 2007 (S.I. 2007/1678)
- European Communities (Designation) (No. 3) Order 2007 (S.I. 2007/1679)
- Parliamentary Constituencies (England) Order 2007 (S.I. 2007/1681)
- Education (Student Loans) (Repayment) (Amendment) Regulations 2007 (S.I. 2007/1683)
- Protection of Children and Vulnerable Adults and Care Standards Tribunal (Amendment) Regulations 2007 (S.I. 2007/1684)
- Education (School Teachers' Pay and Conditions) (No. 2) (Amendment) Order 2007 (S.I. 2007/1688)

== 1701–1800 ==
- Poultry Breeding Flocks and Hatcheries (Wales) Order 2007 (S.I. 2007/1708)
- Secure Training Centre (Amendment) Rules 2007 (S.I. 2007/1709)
- Products of Animal Origin (Third Country Imports) (Wales) (Amendment) Regulations 2007 (S.I. 2007/1710)
- Transfrontier Shipment of Waste Regulations 2007 (S.I. 2007/1711)
- Traffic Management (Guidance on Intervention Criteria) (Wales) Order 2007 (S.I. 2007/1712)
- Street Works (Inspection Fees) (Wales) (Amendment) Regulations 2007 (S.I. 2007/1713)
- North/South Co-operation (Implementation Bodies) (Amendment) (Northern Ireland) Order 2007 (S.I. 2007/1719)
- Education (Outturn Statements) (England) Regulations 2007 (S.I. 2007/1720)
- Welfare Reform Act 2007 Commencement (No. 1) Order 2007 (S.I. 2007/1721)
- Road Traffic (Permitted Parking Area and Special Parking area) (City of Manchester) (Amendment) Order 2007 (S.I. 2007/1736)
- Town and Country Planning (Control of Advertisements) (England) (Amendment) Regulations 2007 (S.I. 2007/1739)
- REACH (Appointment of Competent Authorities) Regulations 2007 (S.I. 2007/1742)
- Primary Care Trusts (Establishment and Dissolution) (England) Amendment (No. 2) Order 2007 (S.I. 2007/1743)
- Court of Protection Rules 2007 (S.I. 2007/1744)
- Court of Protection Fees Order 2007 (S.I. 2007/1745)
- Spelthorne College, Ashford, Middlesex (Dissolution) Order 2007 (S.I. 2007/1746)
- Skelmersdale College (Dissolution) Order 2007 (S.I. 2007/1747)
- North Trafford College of Further Education (Dissolution) Order 2007 (S.I. 2007/1748)
- Social Security (Miscellaneous Amendments) (No. 3) Regulations 2007 (S.I. 2007/1749)
- Home Loss Payments (Prescribed Amounts) (England) Regulations 2007 (S.I. 2007/1750)
- Farnham College (Dissolution) Order 2007 (S.I. 2007/1751)
- Cricklade College, Andover (Dissolution) Order 2007 (S.I. 2007/1752)
- Social Security (Industrial Injuries) (Prescribed Diseases) Amendment (No. 2) Regulations 2007 (S.I. 2007/1753)
- Keighley College (Dissolution) Order 2007 (S.I. 2007/1754)
- Bovine Products (Restriction on Placing on the Market) (England) (No. 2) (Amendment) Regulations 2007 (S.I. 2007/1755)
- Lord Chancellor (Modification of Functions) Order 2007 (S.I. 2007/1756)
- Criminal Justice Act 2003 (Reviews of Sentencing) (Consequential and Supplementary Provisions) Order 2007 (S.I. 2007/1762)
- Plant Health (Import Inspection Fees) (Wales) (Amendment) Regulations 2007 (S.I. 2007/1763)
- Disability Discrimination (General Qualifications Bodies)(Relevant Qualifications, Reasonable Steps and Physical Features) Regulations 2007 (S.I. 2007/1764)
- Plant Health (Plant Passport Fees) (Wales) Regulations 2007 (S.I. 2007/1765)
- NHS Foundation Trusts (Trust Funds: Appointment of Trustees) Order 2007 (S.I. 2007/1766)
- Veterinary Surgery (Artificial Insemination) (Amendment) Order 2007 (S.I. 2007/1767)
- Digital Switchover (Disclosure of Information) Act 2007 (Prescription of Information) Order 2007 (S.I. 2007/1768)
- Day Care and Child Minding (Registration Fees) (England) (Amendment) Regulations 2007 (S.I. 2007/1769)
- Public Guardian Board Regulations 2007 (S.I. 2007/1770)
- Early Years Foundation Stage (Welfare Requirements) Regulations 2007 (S.I. 2007/1771)
- Early Years Foundation Stage (Learning and Development Requirements) Order 2007 (S.I. 2007/1772)
- Gambling Act 2005 (Premises Licences and Provisional Statements) (Amendment) (England and Wales) Regulations 2007 (S.I. 2007/1775)
- Gambling Act 2005 (Limits on Prize Gaming) Regulations 2007 (S.I. 2007/1777)
- Miscellaneous Food Additives and the Sweeteners in Food (Amendment) (England) Regulations 2007 (S.I. 2007/1778)
- Urban Regeneration Agency (London Development Agency) Transfer Scheme 2000 (Modification) Order 2007 (S.I. 2007/1789)
- Railways (North and West London Lines) Exemption Order 2007 (S.I. 2007/1790)
- Gambling (Operating Licence and Single-Machine Permit Fees) (Amendment) (No. 2) Regulations 2007 (S.I. 2007/1791)
- Children Act 2004 (Director of Children's Services) Appointed Day Order 2007 (S.I. 2007/1792)
- Pershore Group of Colleges (Dissolution) Order 2007 (S.I. 2007/1793)
- Pershore Group of Colleges (Designated Staff) Order 2007 (S.I. 2007/1794)
- Childcare Providers (Information, Advice and Training) Regulations 2007 (S.I. 2007/1797)

== 1801–1900 ==
- Education and Inspections Act 2006 (Commencement No. 5 and Saving Provisions) Order 2007 (S.I. 2007/1801)
- Associated British Ports (Immingham Gas Jetty) Harbour Revision Order 2007 (S.I. 2007/1803)
- Road Vehicles (Construction and Use) (Amendment) Regulations 2007 (S.I. 2007/1817)
- National Health Service (Functions of Strategic Health Authorities and Primary Care Trusts and Administration Arrangements) (England) (Amendment No.2) Regulations 2007 (S.I. 2007/1818)
- Community Drivers' Hours and Recording Equipment Regulations 2007 (S.I. 2007/1819)
- Income Tax Act 2007 (Amendment) (No. 2) Order 2007 (S.I. 2007/1820)
- Financial Services and Markets Act 2000 (Exemption) (Amendment No. 2) Order 2007 (S.I. 2007/1821)
- Humber Bridge (Debts) Order 2007 (S.I. 2007/1828)
- Crime Prevention (Designated Areas) Order 2007 (S.I. 2007/1829)
- Crime and Disorder (Formulation and Implementation of Strategy) Regulations 2007 (S.I. 2007/1830)
- Crime and Disorder (Prescribed Information) Regulations 2007 (S.I. 2007/1831)
- Gaming Machines in Alcohol Licensed Premises (Notification Fee) (England and Wales) Regulations 2007 (S.I. 2007/1832)
- Gambling Act 2005 (Licensed Premises Gaming Machine Permits) (England and Wales) Regulations 2007 (S.I. 2007/1833)
- Gambling Act 2005 (Club Gaming and Club Machine Permits) Regulations 2007 (S.I. 2007/1834)
- Bovine Products (Restriction on Placing on the Market) (Wales) (No. 2) (Amendment) Regulations 2007 (S.I. 2007/1835)
- Education (National Curriculum) (Foundation Stage Early Learning Goals) (England) (Amendment) Order 2007 (S.I. 2007/1836)
- Time Off for Public Duties (Parent Councils) Order 2007 (S.I. 2007/1837)
- Social Security (Contributions) (Amendment No. 4) Regulations 2007 (S.I. 2007/1838)
- Crime and Disorder Act 1998 (Responsible Authorities) (No. 2) Order 2007 (S.I. 2007/1839)
- Crime and Disorder Strategies (Prescribed Descriptions) (England) (Amendment) Order 2007 (S.I. 2007/1840)
- Education (National Curriculum) (Attainment Targets and Programmes of Study in English) (England) (Amendment) Order 2007 (S.I. 2007/1841)
- Offshore Marine Conservation (Natural Habitats, &c.) Regulations 2007 (S.I. 2007/1842)
- Conservation (Natural Habitats, &c.) (Amendment) Regulations 2007 (S.I. 2007/1843)
- Town and Country Planning (General Development Procedure) (Amendment) (England) Order 2007 (S.I. 2007/1844)
- Domestic Violence, Crime and Victims Act 2004 (Commencement No. 9 and Transitional Provisions) Order 2007 (S.I. 2007/1845)
- EC Competition Law (Articles 84 and 85) Enforcement (Revocation) Regulations 2007 (S.I. 2007/1846)
- Electoral Administration Act 2006 (Commencement No. 4 and Transitional Provision) Order 2007 (S.I. 2007/1847)
- Cumbria Institute of the Arts Higher Education Corporation (Dissolution) Order 2007 (S.I. 2007/1848)
- Disability Discrimination Act 1995 (Amendment) (Further Education) Regulations 2007 (S.I. 2007/1849)
- Armed Forces (Alignment of Service Discipline Acts) Order 2007 (S.I. 2007/1859)
- Education (Special Educational Needs) (England) (Consolidation) (Amendment) Regulations 2007 (S.I. 2007/1860)
- Armed Forces (Service Police Amendments) Order 2007 (S.I. 2007/1861)
- Stonebridge Housing Action Trust (Dissolution) Order 2007 (S.I. 2007/1862)
- Export and Trade Control Order 2007 (S.I. 2007/1863)
- Further Education (Principals' Qualifications) (England) Regulations 2007 (S.I. 2007/1864)
- Student Fees (Amounts) (England) (Amendment) Regulations 2007 (S.I. 2007/1865)
- Social Security (Claims and Payments) Amendment (No. 2) Regulations 2007 (S.I. 2007/1866)
- Education (Penalty Notices) (England) Regulations 2007 (S.I. 2007/1867)
- Education (Reintegration Interview) (England) Regulations 2007 (S.I. 2007/1868)
- Education (Parenting Contracts and Parenting Orders) (England) Regulations 2007 (S.I. 2007/1869)
- Education (Provision of Full-Time Education for Excluded Pupils) (England) Regulations 2007 (S.I. 2007/1870)
- Seeds (National Lists of Varieties) (Amendment) Regulations 2007 (S.I. 2007/1871)
- Seed (Miscellaneous Amendments) (England) Regulations 2007 (S.I. 2007/1872)
- General Teaching Council for England (Registration of Teachers) (Amendment) Regulations 2007 (S.I. 2007/1883)
- General Dental Council (Overseas Registration Examination Regulations) Order of Council 2007 (S.I. 2007/1884)
- Nursing and Midwifery Council (Fees) (Amendment) Rules Order of Council 2007 (S.I. 2007/1885)
- Medical Act 1983 Amendments (Transitional Provisions Relating to Postgraduate Training) Order of Council 2007 (S.I. 2007/1886)
- Nursing and Midwifery Council (Midwives) (Amendment) Rules Order of Council 2007 (S.I. 2007/1887)
- Regulatory Reform (Collaboration etc. between Ombudsmen) Order 2007 (S.I. 2007/1889)
- Traffic Management Act 2004 (Commencement No. 4 and Transitional Provisions) (England) Order 2007 (S.I. 2007/1890)
- Police Act 1997 (Criminal Records) (Amendment No. 2) Regulations 2007 (S.I. 2007/1892)
- Plant Health (England) (Amendment) Order 2007 (S.I. 2007/1893)
- Coal Mines (Control of Inhalable Dust) Regulations 2007 (S.I. 2007/1894)
- Civil Aviation (Access to Air Travel for Disabled Persons and Persons with Reduced Mobility) Regulations 2007 (S.I. 2007/1895)
- Competition Act 1998 (Public Policy Exclusion) Order 2007 (S.I. 2007/1896)
- Mental Capacity Act 2005 (Commencement No. 2) Order 2007 (S.I. 2007/1897)
- Mental Capacity Act 2005 (Transitional and Consequential Provisions) Order 2007 (S.I. 2007/1898)
- Mental Capacity Act 2005 (Transfer Of Proceedings) Order 2007 (S.I. 2007/1899)
- Public Health (Aircraft) (Amendment) (Wales) Regulations 2007 (S.I. 2007/1900)

== 1901–2000 ==
- Public Health (Ships) (Amendment) (Wales) Regulations 2007 (S.I. 2007/1901)
- Road Traffic (Permitted Parking Area and Special Parking Area) (County of North Yorkshire) (Borough of Scarborough) Order 2007 (S.I. 2007/1902)
- Licensing and Management of Houses in Multiple Occupation (Additional Provisions) (England) Regulations 2007 (S.I. 2007/1903)
- Houses in Multiple Occupation (Certain Converted Blocks of Flats) (Modifications to the Housing Act 2004 and Transitional Provisions for section 257 HMOs) (England) Regulations 2007 (S.I. 2007/1904)
- Spreadable Fats (Marketing Standards) (Wales) (Amendment) Regulations 2007 (S.I. 2007/1905)
- Air Navigation (Restriction of Flying) (Nuclear Installations) Regulations 2007 (S.I. 2007/1929)
- Occupational Pension Schemes (Winding Up, Winding Up Notices and Reports etc.) (Amendment) Regulations 2007 (S.I. 2007/1930)
- Vaccine Damage Payments Act 1979 Statutory Sum Order 2007 (S.I. 2007/1931)
- Police Pension Fund Regulations 2007 (S.I. 2007/1932)
- Mobile Roaming (European Communities) Regulations 2007 (S.I. 2007/1933)
- Road Traffic (Permitted Parking Area and Special Parking Area) (County of Northamptonshire) (Corby, Wellingborough, East Northamptonshire and South Northamptonshire) Order 2007 (S.I. 2007/1934)
- Road Traffic (Permitted Parking Area and Special Parking Area) (County of Warwickshire) (District of Warwick) Order 2007 (S.I. 2007/1935)
- Gambling Act 2005 (Exempt Gaming in Alcohol-Licensed Premises) Regulations 2007 (S.I. 2007/1940)
- Plant Protection Products (Amendment) (No. 2) Regulations 2007 (S.I. 2007/1941)
- Gambling Act 2005 (Gaming in Clubs) Regulations 2007 (S.I. 2007/1942)
- Common Agricultural Policy (Wine) (England and Northern Ireland) (Amendment) Regulations 2007 (S.I. 2007/1943)
- Gambling Act 2005 (Exempt Gaming in Clubs) Regulations 2007 (S.I. 2007/1944)
- Gambling Act 2005 (Club Gaming Permits) (Authorised Gaming) Regulations 2007 (S.I. 2007/1945)
- Home Information Pack (Redress Scheme) (No. 2) Order 2007 (S.I. 2007/1946)
- Company and Business Names (Amendment) Regulations 2007 (S.I. 2007/1947)
- Electricity (Offshore Generating Stations) (Safety Zones) (Application Procedures and Control of Access) Regulations 2007 (S.I. 2007/1948)
- European Grouping of Territorial Cooperation Regulations 2007 (S.I. 2007/1949)
- Local Authorities (Functions and Responsibilities) (England) (Amendment No. 3) Regulations 2007 (S.I. 2007/1950)
- Street Works (Registers, Notices, Directions and Designations) (England) Regulations 2007 (S.I. 2007/1951)
- Street Works (Fixed Penalty) (England) Regulations 2007 (S.I. 2007/1952)
- Gas (Applications for Licences and Extensions and Restrictions of Licences) Regulations 2007 (S.I. 2007/1971)
- Electricity (Applications for Licences, Modifications of an Area and Extensions and Restrictions of Licences) Regulations 2007 (S.I. 2007/1972)
- Regulatory Reform (Financial Services and Markets Act 2000) Order 2007 (S.I. 2007/1973)
- Insolvency (Amendment) Rules 2007 (S.I. 2007/1974)
- National Health Service (Charges for Drugs and Appliances) and (Travel Expenses and Remission of Charges) Amendment Regulations 2007 (S.I. 2007/1975)
- Trade Marks (Relative Grounds) Order 2007 (S.I. 2007/1976)
- Electricity Works (Environmental Impact Assessment) (England and Wales) (Amendment) Regulations 2007 (S.I. 2007/1977)
- Akiva School (Designation as having a Religious Character) Order 2007 (S.I. 2007/1978)
- Child Support (Miscellaneous Amendments) Regulations 2007 (S.I. 2007/1979)
- Archbishop Cranmer Church of England Primary School (Designation as having a Religious Character) Order 2007 (S.I. 2007/1980)
- Bolton Muslim Girls School (Designation as having a Religious Character) Order 2007 (S.I. 2007/1982)
- Holy Family Roman Catholic and Church of England College (Designation as having a Religious Character) Order 2007 (S.I. 2007/1983)
- Addition of Vitamins, Minerals and Other Substances (Wales) Regulations 2007 (S.I. 2007/1984)
- Our Lady Star of the Sea Catholic Primary School (Designation as having a Religious Character) Order 2007 (S.I. 2007/1985)
- Rosary Catholic Primary School (Designation as having a Religious Character) Order 2007 (S.I. 2007/1987)
- St Paul's C of E VA Primary School (Designation as having a Religious Character) Order 2007 (S.I. 2007/1988)
- Southminster Church of England Voluntary Controlled Primary School (Designation as having a Religious Character) Order 2007 (S.I. 2007/1989)
- Wilton and Barford CofE Primary School (Designation as having a Religious Character) Order 2007 (S.I. 2007/1990)
- Welfare Reform Act 2007 Commencement (No. 2) Order 2007 (S.I. 2007/1991)
- Pipe-line Works (Environmental Impact Assessment) (Amendment) Regulations 2007 (S.I. 2007/1992)
- Railways Act 2005 (Commencement No. 9) Order 2007 (S.I. 2007/1993)
- Gas Transporter Pipe-line Works (Environmental Impact Assessment) (Amendment) Regulations 2007 (S.I. 2007/1996)
- Transmissible Spongiform Encephalopathies (No. 2) (Amendment) Regulations 2007 (S.I. 2007/1998)
- Criminal Justice Act 2003 (Commencement No.16) Order 2007 (S.I. 2007/1999)
- Pneumoconiosis etc. (Workers' Compensation) (Prescribed Occupations) Order 2007 (S.I. 2007/2000)

== 2001–2100 ==
- Education (Assisted Places) (Amendment) (England) Regulations 2007 (S.I. 2007/2001)
- Education (Assisted Places) (Incidental Expenses) (Amendment) (England) Regulations 2007 (S.I. 2007/2002)
- Heather and Grass etc. Burning (England) Regulations 2007 (S.I. 2007/2003)
- Reciprocal Enforcement of Maintenance Orders (United States of America) Order 2007 (S.I. 2007/2005)
- Recovery of Maintenance (United States of America) Order 2007 (S.I. 2007/2006)
- Regulatory Reform (Game) Order 2007 (S.I. 2007/2007)
- Rights of Way (Hearings and Inquiries Procedure) (England) Rules 2007 (S.I. 2007/2008)
- Patient Information Advisory Group (Establishment) (Amendment) Regulations 2007 (S.I. 2007/2009)
- Ecodesign for Energy-Using Products Regulations 2007 (S.I. 2007/2037)
- Football Spectators (Seating) Order 2007 (S.I. 2007/2038)
- Gambling Act 2005 (Incidental Non-Commercial Lotteries) Regulations 2007 (S.I. 2007/2040)
- Gambling Act 2005 (Non-Commercial Equal-Chance Gaming) Regulations 2007 (S.I. 2007/2041)
- National Minimum Wage Act 1998 (Amendment) Regulations 2007 (S.I. 2007/2042)
- Transmissible Spongiform Encephalopathies (Wales) (Amendment) Regulations 2007 (S.I. 2007/2043)
- Welsh Forms of Oaths and Affirmations (Government of Wales Act 2006) Order 2007 (S.I. 2007/2044)
- Justice and Security (Northern Ireland) Act 2007 (Commencement No.1 and Transitional Provisions) Order 2007 (S.I. 2007/2045)
- Education (Individual Pupil Information) (Prescribed Persons) (Amendment) Regulations 2007 (S.I. 2007/2050)
- Public Guardian (Fees, etc.) Regulations 2007 (S.I. 2007/2051)
- Police and Justice Act 2006 (Commencement No. 1) (Northern Ireland) Order 2007 (S.I. 2007/2052)
- Traffic Management Act 2004 (Commencement No. 5 and Transitional Provisions) (England) Order 2007 (S.I. 2007/2053)
- National Health Service Pension Scheme (Amendment) Regulations 2007 (S.I. 2007/2054)
- Social Security (Contributions) (Amendment No. 5) Regulations 2007 (S.I. 2007/2068)
- Income Tax (Pay as You Earn) (Amendment No. 2) Regulations 2007 (S.I. 2007/2069)
- Social Security Contributions (Managed Service Companies) Regulations 2007 (S.I. 2007/2070)
- Limited Liability Partnerships (Amendment) Regulations 2007 (S.I. 2007/2073)
- Zoonoses and Animal By-Products (Fees) (England) Regulations 2007 (S.I. 2007/2074)
- Licensing Act 2003 (Amendment of Schedule 4) Order 2007 (S.I. 2007/2075)
- Welfare of Farmed Animals (England) Regulations 2007 (S.I. 2007/2078)
- Working Time (Amendment) Regulations 2007 (S.I. 2007/2079)
- Nutrition and Health Claims (England) Regulations 2007 (S.I. 2007/2080)
- Companies (Political Expenditure Exemption) Order 2007 (S.I. 2007/2081)
- Wireless Telegraphy (Ultra-Wideband Equipment) (Exemption) Regulations 2007 (S.I. 2007/2084)
- Value Added Tax (Amendment) (No. 5) Regulations 2007 (S.I. 2007/2085)
- Insurance Companies (Overseas Life Assurance Business) (Excluded Business) (Amendment) Regulations 2007 (S.I. 2007/2086)
- Insurance Companies (Taxation of Reinsurance Business) (Amendment) Regulations 2007 (S.I. 2007/2087)
- Insurance Companies (Overseas Life Assurance Business) (Compliance) (Amendment) Regulations 2007 (S.I. 2007/2088)
- Local Authorities (Conduct of Referendums) (England) Regulations 2007 (S.I. 2007/2089)
- Excise Duties (Small Non-Commercial Consignments) Relief (Amendment) (Revocation) Regulations 2007 (S.I. 2007/2092)

== 2101–2200 ==
- Gambling Act 2005 (Amendment of Schedule 6) Order 2007 (S.I. 2007/2101)
- Trinity College, Carmarthen (Designated Institutions in Higher Education) (Wales) Order 2007 (S.I. 2007/2112)
- Further Education Teachers' Continuing Professional Development and Registration (England) Regulations 2007 (S.I. 2007/2116)
- Education (Specified Work and Registration) (England) (Amendment) Regulations 2007 (S.I. 2007/2117)
- Finance Act 2007 section 22(3) (Appointed Day) Order 2007 (S.I. 2007/2118)
- Individual Savings Account (Amendment) Regulations 2007 (S.I. 2007/2119)
- Personal Equity Plan (Amendment) Regulations 2007 (S.I. 2007/2120)
- Social Security (Ireland) Order 2007 (S.I. 2007/2122)
- Armed Forces, Army, Air Force and Naval Discipline Acts (Continuation) Order 2007 (S.I. 2007/2123)
- Consular Fees (Amendment) (No. 2) Order 2007 (S.I. 2007/2124)
- Films Co-Production Agreements (Amendment) Order 2007 (S.I. 2007/2125)
- International Mutual Administrative Assistance in Tax Matters Order 2007 (S.I. 2007/2126)
- Double Taxation Relief (Taxes on Income) (Macedonia) Order 2007 (S.I. 2007/2127)
- Secretary of State for Justice Order 2007 (S.I. 2007/2128)
- Transfer of Functions (Olympics and Paralympics) Order 2007 (S.I. 2007/2129)
- Lebanon (United Nations Sanctions) (Overseas Territories) (Amendment) Order 2007 (S.I. 2007/2131)
- Iran (United Nations Measures) (Overseas Territories) (Amendment) Order 2007 (S.I. 2007/2132)
- European Communities (Designation) (No. 4) Order 2007 (S.I. 2007/2133)
- European Communities (Definition of Treaties) (Agreement amending the Cotonou Agreement) Order 2007 (S.I. 2007/2135)
- European Communities (Definition of Treaties) (Amended Cotonou Agreement) (Community Aid Internal Agreement) Order 2007 (S.I. 2007/2136)
- European Communities (Definition of Treaties) (Stabilisation and Association Agreement) (Republic of Albania) Order 2007 (S.I. 2007/2137)
- Liberia (Restrictive Measures) (Overseas Territories) (Amendment No. 2) Order 2007 (S.I. 2007/2138)
- Scotland Act 1998 (Cross-Border Public Authorities) (Traffic Commissioner for the Scottish Traffic Area) Order 2007 (S.I. 2007/2139)
- International Tribunals (Sierra Leone) (Application of Provisions) Order 2007 (S.I. 2007/2140)
- Virgin Islands (Territorial Sea) Order 2007 (S.I. 2007/2141)
- National Assembly for Wales (Diversion of Functions) (No. 2) Order 2007 (S.I. 2007/2142)
- National Assembly for Wales (Legislative Competence) (Amendment of Schedule 7 to the Government of Wales Act 2006) Order 2007 (S.I. 2007/2143)
- Inspectors of Education, Children's Services and Skills (No. 4) Order 2007 (S.I. 2007/2144)
- The Official Secrets Act 1989 (Prescription) (Amendment) Order 2007 (S.I. 2007/2148)
- Rehabilitation of Offenders Act 1974 (Exceptions) (Amendment) (England and Wales) Order 2007 (S.I. 2007/2149)
- Child Benefit (General) (Amendment) Regulations 2007 (S.I. 2007/2150)
- Child Tax Credit (Amendment) Regulations 2007 (S.I. 2007/2151)
- Betting and Gaming Duties Act 1981 (Bingo Monetary Amounts) Order 2007 (S.I. 2007/2152)
- Tax Avoidance Schemes (Information) (Amendment) Regulations 2007 (S.I. 2007/2153)
- Plant Health (Phytophthora ramorum) (England) (Amendment) Order 2007 (S.I. 2007/2155)
- Money Laundering Regulations 2007 (S.I. 2007/2157)
- Categories of Gaming Machine Regulations 2007 (S.I. 2007/2158)
- Gambling Act 2005 (Horserace Betting Levy) Order 2007 (S.I. 2007/2159)
- Financial Services and Markets Act 2000 (Markets in Financial Instruments) (Amendment No. 2) Regulations 2007 (S.I. 2007/2160)
- Lasting Powers of Attorney, Enduring Powers of Attorney and Public Guardian (Amendment) Regulations 2007 (S.I. 2007/2161)
- Community Order (Review by Specified Courts) Order 2007 (S.I. 2007/2162)
- Value Added Tax (Betting, Gaming and Lotteries) Order 2007 (S.I. 2007/2163)
- Registration of Marriages (Amendment) Regulations 2007 (S.I. 2007/2164)
- Capital Allowances (Energy-saving Plant and Machinery) (Amendment) Order 2007 (S.I. 2007/2165)
- Capital Allowances (Environmentally Beneficial Plant and Machinery) (Amendment) Order 2007 (S.I. 2007/2166)
- Gaming Duty (Amendment) Regulations 2007 (S.I. 2007/2167)
- Aggregates Levy (Registration and Miscellaneous Provisions) (Amendment) Regulations 2007 (S.I. 2007/2168)
- Gambling Act 2005 (Commencement No. 6 and Transitional Provisions) (Amendment) (No. 2) Order 2007 (S.I. 2007/2169)
- Export Control (Iran) (Amendment) Order 2007 (S.I. 2007/2170)
- Criminal Justice and Court Services Act 2000 (Amendment) Order 2007 (S.I. 2007/2171)
- Finance Act 2007 Schedule 1 (Appointed Date) Order 2007 (S.I. 2007/2172)
- Value Added Tax (Supply of Services) (Amendment) Order 2007 (S.I. 2007/2173)
- Non-Contentious Probate Fees (Amendment) Order 2007 (S.I. 2007/2174)
- Family Proceedings Fees (Amendment) (No. 2) Order 2007 (S.I. 2007/2175)
- Civil Proceedings Fees (Amendment) (No. 2) Order 2007 (S.I. 2007/2176)
- North East Lincolnshire Primary Care Trust (Change of Name) (Establishment) Amendment Order 2007 (S.I. 2007/2177)
- Medicines for Human Use (Administration and Sale or Supply) (Miscellaneous Amendments) Order 2007 (S.I. 2007/2178)
- Medicines (Sale or Supply) (Miscellaneous Provisions) Amendment Regulations 2007 (S.I. 2007/2179)
- Violent Crime Reduction Act 2006 (Commencement No. 3) Order 2007 (S.I. 2007/2180)
- Terrorism Act 2006 (Disapplication of Section 25) Order 2007 (S.I. 2007/2181)
- Children Act 2004 Information Database (England) Regulations 2007 (S.I. 2007/2182)
- Regulatory Reform (Deer) (England and Wales) Order 2007 (S.I. 2007/2183)
- Terrorism Act 2000 (Proscribed Organisations) (Amendment) Order 2007 (S.I. 2007/2184)
- Judicial Pensions and Retirement Act 1993 (Addition of Qualifying Judicial Offices) (No. 2) Order 2007 (S.I. 2007/2185)
- Verification of Information in Passport Applications Etc.(Specified Persons) Order 2007 (S.I. 2007/2186)
- Family Proceedings (Amendment) (No. 2) Rules 2007 (S.I. 2007/2187)
- Family Proceedings Courts (Miscellaneous Amendments) Rules 2007 (S.I. 2007/2188)
- Family Procedure (Adoption) (Amendment) Rules 2007 (S.I. 2007/2189)
- Marketing of Vegetable Plant Material (Wales) (Amendment) Regulations 2007 (S.I. 2007/2190)
- Hydrocarbon Oil Duties (Reliefs for Electricity Generation) (Amendment) Regulations 2007 (S.I. 2007/2191)
- Remote Gaming Duty Regulations 2007 (S.I. 2007/2192)
- Enterprise Act 2002 (Disclosure of Information for Civil Proceedings etc.) Order 2007 (S.I. 2007/2193)
- Companies Act 2006 (Commencement No. 3, Consequential Amendments, Transitional Provisions and Savings) Order 2007 (S.I. 2007/2194)
- Postal Packets (Revenue and Customs) Regulations 2007 (S.I. 2007/2195)
- Regulation of Investigatory Powers Act 2000 (Commencement No. 4) Order 2007 (S.I. 2007/2196)
- Regulation of Investigatory Powers (Acquisition and Disclosure of Communications Data: Code of Practice) Order 2007 (S.I. 2007/2197)
- Offshore Installations (Safety Zones) (No. 5) Order 2007 (S.I. 2007/2198)
- Data Retention (EC Directive) Regulations 2007 (S.I. 2007/2199)
- Regulation of Investigatory Powers (Investigation of Protected Electronic Information: Code of Practice) Order 2007 (S.I. 2007/2200)

== 2201–2300 ==
- Private Security Industry Act 2001 (Amendments to Schedule 2) Order 2007 (S.I. 2007/2201)
- Housing Benefit (Loss of Benefit) (Pilot Scheme) Regulations 2007 (S.I. 2007/2202)
- Diseases of Animals (Approved Disinfectants) (Fees) (England) Order 2007 (S.I. 2007/2203)
- Civil Procedure (Amendment) Rules 2007 (S.I. 2007/2204)
- Railway Pensions (Transfer of Pension Schemes) Order 2007 (S.I. 2007/2205)
- Asylum (Designated States) Order 2007 (S.I. 2007/2211)
- Persons Providing Education at Further Education Institutions in Wales (Conditions) Regulations 2007 (S.I. 2007/2220)
- Magistrates' Courts (Parenting Orders) (Amendment) Rules 2007 (S.I. 2007/2222)
- Extradition Act 2003 (Amendment to Designations) Order 2007 (S.I. 2007/2238)
- Charges for Music Tuition (England) Regulations 2007 (S.I. 2007/2239)
- Gambling Act 2005 (Exempt Gaming in Alcohol-Licensed Premises) (Amendment) Regulations 2007 (S.I. 2007/2240)
- Education (National Curriculum) (Science at Key Stage 4) (England) Order 2007 (S.I. 2007/2241)
- Companies (Interest Rate for Unauthorised Political Donation or Expenditure) Regulations 2007 (S.I. 2007/2242)
- Transmissible Spongiform Encephalopathies (Wales) (Amendment) (No. 2) Regulations 2007 (S.I. 2007/2244)
- Eggs and Chicks (England) Regulations 2007 (S.I. 2007/2245)
- Pollution Prevention and Control (Designation of Directives) (England and Wales) Order 2007 (S.I. 2007/2247)
- A650 Trunk Road (Aireville Road to Hard Ings Roundabout) (Detrunking) Order 2007 (S.I. 2007/2248)
- A629 Trunk Road (City Boundary to Hard Ings Roundabout) (Detrunking) Order 2007 (S.I. 2007/2249)
- A629 Trunk Road (Snaygill Roundabout to County Boundary) (Detrunking) Order 2007 (S.I. 2007/2251)
- A629 Trunk Road (Thorlby Roundabout to Snaygill Roundabout) (Detrunking) Order 2007 (S.I. 2007/2253)
- Gambling Act 2005 (Operating Licence Conditions) Regulations 2007 (S.I. 2007/2257)
- Gambling Act 2005 (Premises Licences) (Review) Regulations 2007 (S.I. 2007/2258)
- Terrorism (Northern Ireland) Act 2006 (Transitional Provisions and Savings) Order 2007 (S.I. 2007/2259)
- Education (Supply of Information about the School Workforce) (No. 2) (England) Regulations 2007 (S.I. 2007/2260)
- Education (School Attendance Targets) (England) Regulations 2007 (S.I. 2007/2261)
- Scottish Parliament (Elections etc.) (Amendment) Order 2007 (S.I. 2007/2262)
- Education (Student Fees, Awards and Support) (Amendment) (No. 2) Regulations 2007 (S.I. 2007/2263)
- Further Education Teachers' Qualifications (England) Regulations 2007 (S.I. 2007/2264)
- Education (National Curriculum) (Attainment Targets and Programmes of Study) (England) (Amendment) Order 2007 (S.I. 2007/2265)
- Food (Suspension of the Use of E 128 Red 2G as Food Colour) (England) Regulations 2007 (S.I. 2007/2266)
- Magistrates' Courts (Reciprocal Enforcement of Maintenance Orders) (Miscellaneous Amendment) Rules 2007 (S.I. 2007/2267)
- Family Proceedings (Amendment) (No. 3) Rules 2007 (S.I. 2007/2268)
- Employment Equality (Sexual Orientation) (Religion or Belief) (Amendment) Regulations 2007 (S.I. 2007/2269)
- A629 Trunk Road (Skipton to Kildwick Improvement and Slip Roads) Order 1996 (Revocation) Order 2007 (S.I. 2007/2270)
- A629 Trunk Road (Ings Lane to Cononley Lane) (Detrunking) Order 1996 (Revocation) Order 2007 (S.I. 2007/2273)
- Education (School Teachers' Pay and Conditions) Order 2007 (S.I. 2007/2282)
- Local Justice Areas Order 2007 (S.I. 2007/2284)
- Town and Country Planning (Amendment of Appeals Procedures) (Wales) Rules 2007 (S.I. 2007/2285)
- Income Tax (Pay As You Earn) (Amendment No. 3) Regulations 2007 (S.I. 2007/2286)
- Children and Adoption Act 2006 (Commencement No. 1) Order 2007 (S.I. 2007/2287)
- Food (Suspension of the use of E 128 Red 2G as Food Colour) (Wales) Regulations 2007 (S.I. 2007/2288)
- Gaming Machine (Single Apparatus) Regulations 2007 (S.I. 2007/2289)
- Income Tax (Pay As You Earn) (Amendment No. 3) Regulations 2007 (S.I. 2007/2296)
- Docklands Light Railway (Capacity Enhancement and 2012 Games Preparation) Order 2007 (S.I. 2007/2297)
- A449 Trunk Road (Dudley, Staffordshire and Worcestershire) (Detrunking) Order 2007 (S.I. 2007/2298)

== 2301–2400 ==
- National Lottery (Amendment) Regulations 2007 (S.I. 2007/2307)
- Education (Fees and Awards) (Wales) Regulations 2007 (S.I. 2007/2310)
- Education Maintenance Allowances (Wales) Regulations 2007 (S.I. 2007/2311)
- Assembly Learning Grants and Loans (Higher Education) (Wales) (Amendment) Regulations 2007 (S.I. 2007/2312)
- Assembly Learning Grants (European Institutions) (Wales) Regulations 2007 (S.I. 2007/2313)
- Assembly Learning Grant (Further Education) Regulations 2007 (S.I. 2007/2314)
- Food (Suspension of the use of E 128 Red 2G as Food Colour) (Wales) (No. 2) Regulations 2007 (S.I. 2007/2315)
- Children and Young People's Plan (Wales) Regulations 2007 (S.I. 2007/2316)
- Criminal Procedure (Amendment No. 2) Rules 2007 (S.I. 2007/2317)
- National Minimum Wage Regulations 1999 (Amendment) Regulations 2007 (S.I. 2007/2318)
- Gaming Machine (Circumstances of Use) Regulations 2007 (S.I. 2007/2319)
- Gaming Machine (Supply &c.) Regulations 2007 (S.I. 2007/2320)
- Gambling Act 2005 (Repeal) (Remote Operating Licence and Credit) Regulations 2007 (S.I. 2007/2321)
- Road Traffic (Permitted Parking Area and Special Parking Area) (County of West Sussex) (Borough of Worthing) Order 2007 (S.I. 2007/2322)
- Bus Lane Contraventions (Approved Local Authorities) (England) (Amendment) (No. 5) Order 2007 (S.I. 2007/2323)
- Education (School Performance Information) (England) Regulations 2007 (S.I. 2007/2324)
- Large Combustion Plants (National Emission Reduction Plan) Regulations 2007 (S.I. 2007/2325)
- Wireless Telegraphy (Licence Charges) (Amendment) Regulations 2007 (S.I. 2007/2326)
- Small Society Lotteries (Registration of Non-Commercial Societies) Regulations 2007 (S.I. 2007/2328)
- Gambling Act 2005 (Advertising of Foreign Gambling) Regulations 2007 (S.I. 2007/2329)
- Import and Export Restrictions (Foot-And-Mouth Disease) (Wales) Regulations 2007 (S.I. 2007/2330)
- Import and Export Restrictions (Foot-And-Mouth Disease) Regulations 2007 (S.I. 2007/2331)
- Private and Voluntary Health Care (Wales) (Amendment) Regulations 2007 (S.I. 2007/2332)
- Common Agricultural Policy (Wine) (Wales) (Amendment) Regulations 2007 (S.I. 2007/2333)
- Dedicated Highways (Registers under Section 31A of the Highways Act 1980) (England) Regulations 2007 (S.I. 2007/2334)
- Countryside and Rights of Way Act 2000 (Commencement No. 13) Order 2007 (S.I. 2007/2335)
- Legal Officers (Annual Fees) Order 2007 (S.I. 2007/2336)
- Birmingham City Council (Selly Oak New Road Tunnel) Scheme 2007 Confirmation Instrument 2007 (S.I. 2007/2339)
- Ecclesiastical Judges, Legal Officers and Others (Fees) Order 2007 (S.I. 2007/2340)
- Value Added Tax Tribunals (Amendment) Rules 2007 (S.I. 2007/2351)
- Education (Nutritional Standards and Requirements for School Food) (England) Regulations 2007 (S.I. 2007/2359)
- Drivers' Hours (Goods Vehicles) (Milk Collection) (Temporary Exemption) Regulations 2007 (S.I. 2007/2370)
- Planning and Compulsory Purchase Act 2004 (Commencement No. 4 and Consequential, Transitional and Savings Provisions) (Wales) (Amendment No.3) Order 2007 (S.I. 2007/2371)
- Home Loss Payments (Prescribed Amounts) (Wales) Regulations 2007 (S.I. 2007/2372)
- Arnos Vale Cemetery, Bristol (Burial Records) Order 2007 (S.I. 2007/2373)
- Air Navigation (Restriction of Flying) (South Armagh) (Revocation) Regulations 2007 (S.I. 2007/2374)
- Import and Export Restrictions (Foot-And-Mouth Disease) (No. 2) Regulations 2007 (S.I. 2007/2375)
- Air Navigation (Restriction of Flying) (Security Establishments in Northern Ireland) (Revocation) Regulations 2007 (S.I. 2007/2376)
- Air Navigation (Restriction of Flying) (Prisons) (Amendment) Regulations 2007 (S.I. 2007/2377)
- Import and Export Restrictions (Foot-And-Mouth Disease) (No. 2) (Wales) Regulations 2007 (S.I. 2007/2385)
- Commons Act 2006 (Commencement No.1, Transitional Provisions and Savings) (Wales) Order 2007 (S.I. 2007/2386)
- Commons (Registration of Town or Village Greens) (Interim Arrangements) (Wales) Regulations 2007 (S.I. 20072396)
- Courts-Martial (Army) (Amendment) Rules 2007 (S.I. 2007/2397)
- Agricultural Holdings (Units of Production) (Wales) Order 2007 (S.I. 2007/2398)

== 2401–2500 ==
- Social Security (Contributions) (Amendment No. 7) Regulations 2007 (S.I. 2007/2401)
- Financial Services and Markets Act 2000 (Motor Insurance) Regulations 2007 (S.I. 2007/2403)
- Commons Registration (General) (Amendment) (England) (No. 2) Regulations 2007 (S.I. 2007/2404)
- Disability Discrimination Act 1995 (Amendment etc.) (General Qualifications Bodies) (Alteration of Premises and Enforcement) Regulations 2007 (S.I. 2007/2405)
- Hydrocarbon Oil Duties (Sulphur-free Diesel) (Hydrogenation of Biomass) (Reliefs) (Amendment) Regulations 2007 (S.I. 2007/2406)
- Animal Gatherings (Wales) Order 2007 (S.I. 2007/2425)
- Non-Domestic Rating (Small Business Relief) (Wales) (Amendment) Order 2007 (S.I. 2007/2438)
- Charges for Residues Surveillance (Amendment) Regulations 2007 (S.I. 2007/2439)
- Wireless Telegraphy (Ultra-Wideband Equipment) (Exemption) (Amendment) Regulations 2007 (S.I. 2007/2440)
- Community Legal Service (Funding) Order 2007 (S.I. 2007/2441)
- Community Legal Service (Financial) (Amendment No. 2) Regulations 2007 (S.I. 2007/2442)
- Community Legal Service (Funding) (Counsel in Family Proceedings) (Amendment) Order 2007 (S.I. 2007/2443)
- Community Legal Service (Costs) (Amendment) Regulations 2007 (S.I. 2007/2444)
- Social Security Act 1989 (Commencement No. 6) Order 2007 (S.I. 2007/2445)
- Offshore Installations (Safety Zones) (No. 6) Order 2007 (S.I. 2007/2446)
- Planning and Compulsory Purchase Act 2004 (Commencement No.4 and Consequential, Transitional and Savings Provisions) (Wales) (Amendment No.4) Order 2007 (S.I. 2007/2447)
- Planning and Compulsory Purchase Act 2004 (Commencement No. 4 and Consequential, Transitional and Savings Provisions) (Wales) (Amendment No. 5) Order 2007 (S.I. 2007/2449)
- Water Industry (Prescribed Conditions) (Amendment) Regulations 2007 (S.I. 2007/2457)
- Environmental Noise (Identification of Noise Sources) (England) (Amendment) Regulations 2007 (S.I. 2007/2458)
- Zoonoses (Monitoring) (Wales) Regulations 2007 (S.I. 2007/2459)
- Smoke Control Areas (Authorised Fuels) (England) (Amendment) Regulations 2007 (S.I. 2007/2460)
- Welfare of Animals (Slaughter or Killing) (Amendment) (Wales) Regulations 2007 (S.I. 2007/2461)
- Smoke Control Areas (Exempted Fireplaces) (England) Order 2007 (S.I. 2007/2462)
- Dangerous Wild Animals Act 1976 (Modification) (No. 2) Order 2007 (S.I. 2007/2465)
- Plant Protection Products (Amendment) (No. 3) Regulations 2007 (S.I. 2007/2466)
- Social Security (Miscellaneous Amendments) (No. 4) Regulations 2007 (S.I. 2007/2470)
- Tobacco Products (Manufacture, Presentation and Sale) (Safety) (Amendment) Regulations 2007 (S.I. 2007/2473)
- Housing Benefit (Loss of Benefit) (Pilot Scheme) (Supplementary) Regulations 2007 (S.I. 2007/2474)
- Disease Control (Wales) (Amendment) Order 2007 (S.I. 2007/2475)
- Foot-and-Mouth Disease (Export Restrictions) (Wales) Regulations 2007 (S.I. 2007/2477)
- Income Tax (Qualifying Child Care) (No. 2) Regulations 2007 (S.I. 2007/2478)
- Working Tax Credit (Entitlement and Maximum Rate) (Amendment No. 2) Regulations 2007 (S.I. 2007/2479)
- Tax Credit (New Category of Child Care Provider) (Revocation) (England) Regulations 2007 (S.I. 2007/2480)
- Tax Credits (Child Care Providers) (Miscellaneous Revocation and Transitional Provisions) (England) Scheme 2007 (S.I. 2007/2481)
- Tonnage Tax (Training Requirement) (Amendment) Regulations 2007 (S.I. 2007/2482)
- Finance Act 2007 (Schedules 13 and 14) Order 2007 (S.I. 2007/2483)
- Sale and Repurchase of Securities (Amendment of Instruments) Order 2007 (S.I. 2007/2484)
- Sale and Repurchase of Securities (Modification of Schedule 13 to the Finance Act 2007) Regulations 2007 (S.I. 2007/2485)
- Sale and Repurchase of Securities (Modification of Enactments) Regulations 2007 (S.I. 2007/2486)
- Income Tax (Manufactured Overseas Dividends) (Amendment) Regulations 2007 (S.I. 2007/2487)
- Manufactured Interest (Tax) Regulations 2007 (S.I. 2007/2488)
- Foot-and-Mouth Disease (Export Restrictions) Regulations 2007 (S.I. 2007/2489)
- Racial and Religious Hatred Act 2006 (Commencement No. 1) Order 2007 (S.I. 2007/2490)
- Northern Ireland (St Andrews Agreement) Act 2006 (Commencement No. 2) Order 2007 (S.I. 2007/2491)
- Hallmarking Act 1973 (Exemption) (Amendment No. 2) Order 2007 (S.I. 2007/2493)
- Diseases of Animals (Approved Disinfectants) (Amendment) (Wales) Order 2007 (S.I. 2007/2494)
- Gambling (Lottery Machine Interval) Order 2007 (S.I. 2007/2495)
- Zoonoses and Animal By-Products (Fees) (Wales) Regulations 2007 (S.I. 2007/2496)
- Electronic Commerce Directive (Racial and Religious Hatred Act 2006) Regulations 2007 (S.I. 2007/2497)
- Common Agricultural Policy Single Payment and Support Schemes (Cross-compliance) (England) (Amendment) Regulations 2007 (S.I. 2007/2500)

== 2501–2600 ==
- Political Parties, Elections and Referendums Act 2000 (Northern Ireland Political Parties) Order 2007 (S.I. 2007/2501)
- Licensing Act 2003 (Summary Review of Premises Licences) Regulations 2007 (S.I. 2007/2502)
- Private Security Industry Act 2001 Regulations (Amendment) Regulations 2007 (S.I. 2007/2504)
- Violent Crime Reduction Act 2006 (Commencement No. 4) Order 2007 (S.I. 2007/2518)
- Social Security (Contributions) (Amendment No. 8) Regulations 2007 (S.I. 2007/2520)
- Disabled Persons (Badges for Motor Vehicles) (England) (Amendment) Regulations 2007 (S.I. 2007/2531)
- Finance Act 2007, Schedule 25 (Commencement and Transitional Provisions) Order 2007 (S.I. 2007/2532)
- Financial Assistance Scheme (Halting Annuitisation) Regulations 2007 (S.I. 2007/2533)
- Road Traffic (Permitted Parking Area and Special Parking Area) (County of Staffordshire) (Staffordshire Moorlands and East Staffordshire) Order 2007 (S.I. 2007/2534)
- Road Traffic (Permitted Parking Area and Special Parking Area) (Metropolitan Borough of Solihull) Order 2007 (S.I. 2007/2535)
- Bus Lane Contraventions (Approved Local Authorities) (England) (Amendment) (No. 6) Order 2007 (S.I. 2007/2536)
- Insolvency (Scotland) Amendment Rules 2007 (S.I. 2007/2537)
- Independent Living Fund (2006) Order 2007 (S.I. 2007/2538)
- Veterinary Medicines Regulations 2007 (S.I. 2007/2539)
- Natural Environment and Rural Communities Act 2006 (Commencement No. 1) (England) Order 2007 (S.I. 2007/2540)
- Companies (Tables A to F) (Amendment) Regulations 2007 (S.I. 2007/2541)
- National Park Authorities' Traffic Orders (Procedure) (England) Regulations 2007 (S.I. 2007/2542)
- Local Government (Best Value Authorities) (Power to Trade) (England) (Amendment No. 2) Order 2007 (S.I. 2007/2543)
- Road Vehicles (Construction and Use) (Amendment) (No. 2) Regulations 2007 (S.I. 2007/2544)
- Road Vehicles (Registration and Licensing) (Amendment) (No. 3) Regulations 2007 (S.I. 2007/2553)
- Sea Fishing (Prohibition on the Removal of Shark Fins) Order 2007 (S.I. 2007/2554)
- Social Security (National Insurance Credits) Amendment Regulations 2007 (S.I. 2007/2582)
- Supervision of Accounts and Reports (Prescribed Body) Order 2007 (S.I. 2007/2583)
- Commons Act 2006 (Commencement No. 3, Transitional Provisions and Savings) (England) Order 2007 (S.I. 2007/2484)
- Commons (Deregistration and Exchange Orders) (Interim Arrangements) (England) Regulations 2007 (S.I. 2007/2585)
- Porcine Semen (Fees) (England) Regulations 2007 (S.I. 2007/2586)
- Works on Common Land (Exemptions) (England) Order 2007 (S.I. 2007/2587)
- Works on Common Land, etc. (Procedure) (England) Regulations 2007 (S.I. 2007/2588)
- Deregistration and Exchange of Common Land and Greens (Procedure) (England) Regulations 2007 (S.I. 2007/2589)
- National Health Service (Travel Expenses and Remission of Charges) (Amendment No.2) Regulations 2007 (S.I. 2007/2590)
- Food for Particular Nutritional Uses (Miscellaneous Amendments) (England) Regulations 2007 (S.I. 2007/2591)
- Local Authorities (Functions and Responsibilities) (England) (Amendment No. 4) Regulations 2007 (S.I. 2007/2593)
- Countryside and Rights of Way Act 2000 (Commencement No. 14) Order 2007 (S.I. 2007/2595)
- Pet Cemeteries (England and Wales) Regulations 2007 (S.I. 2007/2596)
- Commons Registration (General) (Amendment) (Wales) Regulations 2007 (S.I. 2007/2597)
- Manufacture and Storage of Explosives and the Health and Safety (Enforcing Authority) (Amendment and Supplementary Provisions) Regulations 2007 (S.I. 2007/2598)
- New Woodlands School Order 2007 (S.I. 2007/2599)
- Disabled Persons (Badges for Motor Vehicles) (England) (Amendment No. 2) Regulations 2007 (S.I. 2007/2600)

== 2601–2700 ==
- Houses in Multiple Occupation (Specified Educational Establishments) (England) (No. 2) Regulations 2007 (S.I. 2007/2601)
- Equality Act 2006 (Dissolution of Commissions and Consequential and Transitional Provisions) Order 2007 (S.I. 2007/2602)
- Equality Act 2006 (Commencement No. 3 and Savings) Order 2007 (S.I. 2007/2603)
- Equality Act 2006 (Termination of Appointments) Order 2007 (S.I. 2007/2604)
- Firearms (Amendment) Rules 2007 (S.I. 2007/2605)
- Violent Crime Reduction Act 2006 (Realistic Imitation Firearms) Regulations 2007 (S.I. 2007/2606)
- Companies Act 2006 (Commencement No. 4 and Commencement No. 3 (Amendment)) Order 2007 (S.I. 2007/2607)
- Armed Forces (Gurkha Pensions) Order 2007 (S.I. 2007/2608)
- Armed Forces (Gurkha Compensation) Order 2007 (S.I. 2007/2609)
- Environmental Impact Assessment and Natural Habitats (Extraction of Minerals by Marine Dredging) (Wales) Regulations 2007 (S.I. 2007/2610)
- Nutrition and Health Claims (Wales) Regulations 2007 (S.I. 2007/2611)
- Companies (Fees for Inspection and Copying of Company Records) Regulations 2007 (S.I. 2007/2612)
- Social Security Benefit (Computation of Earnings) (Amendment) Regulations 2007 (S.I. 2007/2613)
- Social Security Benefit (Computation of Earnings) (Amendment) Regulations (Northern Ireland) 2007 (S.I. 2007/2614)
- Financial Services and Markets Act 2000 (Financial Promotion) (Amendment No. 2) Order 2007 (S.I. 2007/2615)
- Public Guardian (Fees, etc.) (Amendment) Regulations 2007 (S.I. 2007/2616)
- Court Funds (Amendment No. 2) Rules 2007 (S.I. 2007/2617)
- Social Security (Miscellaneous Amendments) (No. 5) Regulations 2007 (S.I. 2007/2618)
- Magistrates' Courts Fees (Amendment) Order 2007 (S.I. 2007/2619)
- Protection of Children and Vulnerable Adults and Care Standards Tribunal (Review of Inclusion in the PoCA List and Review of Section 142 Directions) Regulations 2007 (S.I. 2007/2620)
- Family Proceedings Courts (Constitution of Committees and Right to Preside) (Amendment) Rules 2007 (S.I. 2007/2621)
- Youth Courts (Constitution of Committees and Right to Preside) (Amendment) Rules 2007 (S.I. 2007/2622)
- Disease Control (England) (Amendment) (No. 2) Order 2007 (S.I. 2007/2623)
- Bluetongue (Amendment) Order 2007 (S.I. 2007/2624)
- Disease Control (Wales) (Amendment) (No. 2) Order 2007 (S.I. 2007/2626)
- Mental Health Act 2007 (Commencement No. 2) Order 2007 (S.I. 2007/2635)
- Charities (Exception from Registration) (Amendment) Regulations 2007 (S.I. 2007/2655)
- Motor Cycles Etc. (EC Type Approval) (Amendment) Regulations 2007 (S.I. 2007/2656)
- London Gateway Logistics and Commercial Centre Order 2007 (S.I. 2007/2657)
- Road Traffic (Permitted Parking Area and Special Parking Area) (County of Worcestershire) (District of Wyre Forest) Order 2007 (S.I. 2007/2684)
- Education (Listed Bodies) (England) Order 2007 (S.I. 2007/2687)
- Education (Recognised Bodies) (England) Order 2007 (S.I. 2007/2688)
- Gambling Act 2005 (Club Gaming and Club Machine Permits) (Amendment) Regulations 2007 (S.I. 2007/2689)

== 2701–2800 ==
- Harborough (Parishes) Order 2007 (S.I. 2007/2705)
- Courts Act 2003 (Commencement No. 13) Order 2007 (S.I. 2007/2706)
- Spring Traps Approval (Variation) (England) Order 2007 (S.I. 2007/2708)
- Tribunals, Courts and Enforcement Act 2007 (Commencement No. 1) Order 2007 (S.I. 2007/2709)
- Import and Export Restrictions (Foot-and-Mouth Disease) (No. 3) (Wales) Regulations 2007 (S.I. 2007/2710)
- Animal Welfare Act 2006 (Commencement No. 2 and Saving and Transitional Provisions) (England) Order 2007 (S.I. 2007/2711)
- Import and Export Restrictions (Foot-and-Mouth Disease) (No. 3) Regulations 2007 (S.I. 2007/2712)
- Plant Health (Phytophthora ramorum) (Wales) (Amendment) Order 2007 (S.I. 2007/2715)
- Plant Health (Wales) (Amendment) Order 2007 (S.I. 2007/2716)
- Childcare Act 2006 (Commencement No. 3 and Transitional Provision) Order 2007 (S.I. 2007/2717)
- Water Supply (Water Quality) Regulations 2000 (Amendment) Regulations 2007 (S.I. 2007/2734)
- Haringey Sixth Form Centre (Governing Body) Order 2007 (S.I. 2007/2741)
- County Durham and Darlington National Health Service Foundation Trust (Transfer of Trust Property) Order 2007 (S.I. 2007/2742)
- Lincolnshire Partnership National Health Service Trust (Transfer of Trust Property) Order 2007 (S.I. 2007/2743)
- Portsmouth City Teaching Primary Care Trust (Transfer of Trust Property) Order 2007 (S.I. 2007/2744)
- Surrey and Sussex Healthcare National Health Service Trust (Transfer of Trust Property) Order 2007 (S.I. 2007/2745)
- South Downs Health National Health Service Trust (Transfer of Trust Property) Order 2007 (S.I. 2007/2746)
- Seed (Miscellaneous Amendments) (Wales) Regulations 2007 (S.I. 2007/2747)
- Police Federation (Amendment) Regulations 2007 (S.I. 2007/2751)
- Food for Particular Nutritional Uses (Miscellaneous Amendments) (Wales) Regulations 2007 (S.I. 2007/2753)
- Police and Justice Act 2006 (Commencement No. 4) Order 2007 (S.I. 2007/2754)
- Imperial College Healthcare National Health Service Trust (Establishment) and the Hammersmith Hospitals National Health Service Trust and the St Mary's National Health Service Trust (Dissolution) Order 2007 (S.I. 2007/2755)
- Staffordshire Ambulance Service National Health Service Trust (Dissolution) Order 2007 (S.I. 2007/2756)
- European Communities (Recognition of Professional Qualifications) Regulations 2007 (S.I. 2007/2781)
- Education (Recognition of School Teachers' Professional Qualifications) (Consequential Provisions) (England) Regulations 2007 (S.I. 2007/2782)
- Fire and Rescue Services (England) (Amendment) Order 2007 (S.I. 2007/2784)
- Natural Mineral Water, Spring Water and Bottled Drinking Water (England) Regulations 2007 (S.I. 2007/2785)
- Plastic Materials and Articles in Contact with Food (Lid Gaskets) (England) Regulations 2007 (S.I. 2007/2786)
- Materials and Articles in Contact with Food (England) Regulations 2007 (S.I. 2007/2790)
- Education (Listed Bodies) (Wales) Order 2007 (S.I. 2007/2794)
- Education (Recognised Bodies) (Wales) Order 2007 (S.I. 2007/2795)
- Medical Act 1983 Amendments (Further Transitional Provisions) Order of Council 2007 (S.I. 2007/2796)
- Road Traffic (Permitted Parking Area and Special Parking Area) (County of Staffordshire) (Newcastle-under-Lyme and Stafford) Order 2007 (S.I. 2007/2797)
- Mental Health Act 2007 (Commencement No. 3) Order 2007 (S.I. 2007/2798)
- Concessionary Bus Travel Act 2007 (Commencement and Transitional Provisions) Order 2007 (S.I. 2007/2799)
- Family Proceedings Fees (Amendment) (No. 2) (Amendment) Order 2007 (S.I. 2007/2800)

== 2801–2900 ==
- Civil Proceedings Fees (Amendment) (No. 2) (Amendment) Order 2007 (S.I. 2007/2801)
- Designation of Schools Having a Religious Character (Independent Schools) (England) (No. 2) Order 2007 (S.I. 2007/2802)
- Diseases of Animals (Approved Disinfectants) (Wales) Order 2007 (S.I. 2007/2803)
- Bluetongue (Amendment) (No. 2) Order 2007 (S.I. 2007/2808)
- Movement of Animals (Restrictions) (England) (Amendment) Order 2007 (S.I. 2007/2809)
- General Teaching Council for Wales (Additional Functions) (Amendment) Order 2007 (S.I. 2007/2810)
- Education (Amendments to Regulations regarding the Recognition of Professional Qualifications) (Wales) Regulations 2007 (S.I. 2007/2811)
- Welfare Reform Act 2007 Commencement (No. 3) Order 2007 (S.I. 2007/2819)
- Companies (Tables A to F) (Amendment) (No. 2) Regulations 2007 (S.I. 2007/2826)
- Road Traffic (Permitted Parking Area and Special Parking Area) (County of Gloucestershire) (Cheltenham, Cotswold, Gloucester, Stroud and Tewkesbury) Order 2007 (S.I. 2007/2837)
- Bus Lane Contraventions (Approved Local Authorities) (England) (Amendment) (No. 7) Order 2007 (S.I. 2007/2838)
- Parochial Fees Order 2007 (S.I. 2007/2850)
- Assembly Learning Grants and Loans (Higher Education) (Wales) (Amendment) (No.2) Regulations 2007 (S.I. 2007/2851)
- Housing Benefit (Local Housing Allowance and Information Sharing) Amendment Regulations 2007 (S.I. 2007/2868)
- Housing Benefit (State Pension Credit) (Local Housing Allowance and Information Sharing) Amendment Regulations 2007 (S.I. 2007/2869)
- Housing Benefit (Local Housing Allowance, Miscellaneous and Consequential) Amendment Regulations 2007 (S.I. 2007/2870)
- Rent Officers (Housing Benefit Functions) Amendment Order 2007 (S.I. 2007/2871)
- Welfare Reform Act 2007 (Commencement No. 4, and Savings and Transitional Provisions) Order 2007 (S.I. 2007/2872)
- Criminal Justice Act 2003 (Commencement No. 17) Order 2007 (S.I. 2007/2874)
- Social Security (Attendance Allowance and Disability Living Allowance) (Amendment) Regulations 2007 (S.I. 2007/2875)
- Administrative Justice and Tribunals Council (Listed Tribunals) (Wales) Order 2007 (S.I. 2007/2876)
- Castle Hill Primary School (Change to School Session Times) Order 2007 (S.I. 2007/2877)
- Returning Officers (Parliamentary Constituencies) (England) Order 2007 (S.I. 2007/2878)
- Rural Development Programmes and Agricultural Subsidies and Grants Schemes (Appeals) (Wales) (Amendment) Regulations 2007 (S.I. 2007/2900)

== 2901–3000 ==
- Finance Act 2006 (Climate Change Levy: Amendments and Transitional Savings in Consequence of Abolition of Half-rate Supplies) (Appointed Day) Order 2007 (S.I. 2007/2901)
- Finance Act 2007 (Climate Change Levy: Reduced-rate Supplies etc.) (Appointed Day) Order 2007 (S.I. 2007/2902)
- Climate Change Levy (General) (Amendment) Regulations 2007 (S.I. 2007/2903)
- Community Drivers' Hours and Working Time (Foot-and-Mouth Disease) (Temporary Exception) Regulations 2007 (S.I. 2007/2904)
- Social Security (Contributions) (Amendment No. 9) Regulations 2007 (S.I. 2007/2905)
- Channel Tunnel (International Arrangements) (Amendment) Order 2007 (S.I. 2007/2907)
- Channel Tunnel (Miscellaneous Provisions) (Amendment) Order 2007 (S.I. 2007/2908)
- Landfill Tax (Material Removed from Water) Order 2007 (S.I. 2007/2909)
- Gaming Duty (Additional Games) Order 2007 (S.I. 2007/2910)
- Social Security (Claims and Information) Regulations 2007 (S.I. 2007/2911)
- Social Fund Cold Weather Payments (General) Amendment Regulations 2007 (S.I. 2007/2912)
- Armed Forces Act 2006 (Commencement No. 2) Order 2007 (S.I. 2007/2913)
- Transfer of Functions (Equality) Order 2007 (S.I. 2007/2914)
- Scotland Act 1998 (Transfer of Functions to the Scottish Ministers etc.) Order 2007 (S.I. 2007/2915)
- Anguilla (Territorial Sea) Order 2007 (S.I. 2007/2916)
- Turks and Caicos Islands (Territorial Sea) (Amendment) Order 2007 (S.I. 2007/2917)
- Inspectors of Education, Children's Services and Skills (No. 5) Order 2007 (S.I. 2007/2918)
- Exempt Charities (No. 3) Order 2007 (S.I. 2007/2919)
- Channel Tunnel Rail Link (Nomination) (Amendment) Order 2007 (S.I. 2007/2920)
- Toot Hill School (School Day and School Year Regulations) Order 2007 (S.I. 2007/2921)
- Value Added Tax (Amendment) (No. 6) Regulations 2007 (S.I. 2007/2922)
- Value Added Tax (Special Provisions) (Amendment) Order 2007 (S.I. 2007/2923)
- Markets in Financial Instruments Directive (Consequential Amendments) Regulations 2007 (S.I. 2007/2932)
- Environmental Impact Assessment (Agriculture) (Wales) Regulations 2007 (S.I. 2007/2933)
- Consumers, Estate Agents and Redress Act 2007 (Commencement No. 1) Order 2007 (S.I. 2007/2934)
- Transport for London (Consequential Provisions) Order 2007 (S.I. 2007/2935)
- Criminal Defence Service (General) (No. 2) (Amendment No. 2) Regulations 2007 (S.I. 2007/2936)
- Criminal Defence Service (Financial Eligibility) (Amendment No. 2) Regulations 2007 (S.I. 2007/2937)
- Contaminants in Food (England) (Amendment) Regulations 2007 (S.I. 2007/2938)
- Plant Health (England) (Amendment) (No. 2) Order 2007 (S.I. 2007/2950)
- Administrative Justice and Tribunals Council (Listed Tribunals) Order 2007 (S.I. 2007/2951)
- Control of Trade in Endangered Species (Enforcement) (Amendment) Regulations 2007 (S.I. 2007/2952)
- Young Offender Institution (Amendment) Rules 2007 (S.I. 2007/2953)
- Prison (Amendment) Rules 2007 (S.I. 2007/2954)
- Stroud (Parishes) Order 2007 (S.I. 2007/2955)
- Agricultural Holdings (Units of Production) (England) Order 2007 (S.I. 2007/2968)
- Income Tax (Pay As You Earn) (Amendment No. 4) Regulations 2007 (S.I. 2007/2969)
- Import and Export Restrictions (Foot-and-Mouth Disease) (No. 4) Regulations 2007 (S.I. 2007/2970)
- Import and Export Restrictions (Foot-and-Mouth Disease) (No. 4) (Wales) Regulations 2007 (S.I. 2007/2971)
- Education (Local Education Authority Performance Targets) (England) (Amendment) Regulations 2007 (S.I. 2007/2972)
- Government of Wales Act 2006 (Approved European Body of Accountants) Order 2007 (S.I. 2007/2973)
- Companies (Cross-Border Mergers) Regulations 2007 (S.I. 2007/2974)
- Education (School Performance Targets) (England) (Amendment) Regulations 2007 (S.I. 2007/2975)
- Enterprise Act 2002 (Part 9 Restrictions on Disclosure of Information) (Amendment and Specification) Order 2007 (S.I. 2007/2977)
- Education (Pupil Referral Units) (Management Committees etc.) (England) Regulations 2007 (S.I. 2007/2978)
- Education (Pupil Referral Units) (Application of Enactments) (England) Regulations 2007 (S.I. 2007/2979)
- Flood Defence (Mimmshall Brook Works) Order 2007 (S.I. 2007/2980)
- Superannuation (Admission to Schedule 1 to the Superannuation Act 1972) Order 2007 (S.I. 2007/2981)
- Motor Vehicles (Compulsory Insurance) (Information Centre and Compensation Body) (Amendment) Regulations 2007 (S.I. 2007/2982)
- Contaminants in Food (England) (Amendment) (No. 2) Regulations 2007 (S.I. 2007/2983)
- Import and Export Restrictions (Foot-and-Mouth Disease) (No. 5) Regulations 2007 (S.I. 2007/2984)
- Bluetongue (Compensation) Order 2007 (S.I. 2007/2996)
- Import and Export Restrictions (Foot-and-Mouth Disease) (No. 5) (Wales) Regulations 2007 (S.I. 2007/2997)
- Pesticides (Maximum Residue Levels in Crops, Food and Feeding Stuffs) (England and Wales) (Amendment) (No. 3) Regulations 2007 (S.I. 2007/2998)
- Civil Aviation (Contributions to the Air Travel Trust) Regulations 2007 (S.I. 2007/2999)
- Income Tax (Benefits Received by Former Owner of Property) (Election for Inheritance Tax Treatment) Regulations 2007 (S.I. 2007/3000)

== 3001–3100 ==
- Offender Management Act 2007 (Commencement No.1 and Transitional Provisions) Order 2007 (S.I. 2007/3001)
- Bluetongue (Wales) (Amendment) Order 2007 (S.I. 2007/3002)
- Halton (Parishes) Order 2007 (S.I. 2007/3003)
- Cattle Identification (Wales) (Amendment) Regulations 2007 (S.I. 2007/3004)
- General Dental Council (Appointments Committee and Appointment of Members of Committees) (Amendment) Rules Order of Council 2007 (S.I. 2007/3005)
- General Dental Council (Election of Members) (Amendment) Rules Order of Council 2007 (S.I. 2007/3006)
- Feed (Corn Gluten Feed and Brewers Grains) (Emergency Control) (England) (Revocation) Regulations 2007 (S.I. 2007/3007)
- Feed (Specified Undesirable Substances) (England) Regulations 2007 (S.I. 2007/3008)
- Education (Determination of Admission Arrangements) (Amendment No. 2) (England) Regulations 2007 (S.I. 2007/3009)
- Bluetongue (Wales) (Compensation) Order 2007 3010)
- Magistrates' Courts Warrants (Specifications of Provisions) (Amendment) Order 2007 (S.I. 2007/3011)
- Accession (Worker Authorisation and Worker Registration) (Amendment) Regulations 2007 (S.I. 2007/3012)
- Plant Health (Import Inspection Fees) (England) (Amendment) (No. 2) Regulations 2007 (S.I. 2007/3013)
- Occupational Pension Schemes (EEA States) Regulations 2007 (S.I. 2007/3014)
- Pensions Act 2007 (Commencement No. 1) Order 2007 (S.I. 2007/3063)
- Serious Organised Crime and Police Act 2005 (Commencement No. 10) Order 2007 (S.I. 2007/3064)
- Animal Welfare Act 2006 (Commencement No. 2 and Saving and Transitional Provisions) (Wales) Order 2007 (S.I. 2007/3065)
- Maintained Schools (Partnership Agreements) (Wales) Regulations 2007 (S.I. 2007/3066)
- A1(M) Motorway (Junction 58, Junction 60, Junction 61, and Junction 62 Circulatory Carriageways) (Trunking) Order 2007 (S.I. 2007/3067)
- Income Tax (Car Benefits) (Reduction of Value of Appropriate Percentage) (Amendment) Regulations 2007 (S.I. 2007/3068)
- Justice and Security (Northern Ireland) Act 2007 (Commencement No.2) Order 2007 (S.I. 2007/3069)
- Welfare of Farmed Animals (Wales) Regulations 2007 (S.I. 2007/3070)
- Education (School Day and School Year) (England) (Amendment) Regulations 2007 (S.I. 2007/3071)
- Renewable Transport Fuel Obligations Order 2007 (S.I. 2007/3072)
- Police and Justice Act 2006 (Commencement No. 5) Order 2007 (S.I. 2007/3073)
- Education and Inspections Act 2006 (Commencement No.6) Order 2007 (S.I. 2007/3074)
- Merchant Shipping and Fishing Vessels (Control of Noise at Work) Regulations 2007 (S.I. 2007/3075)
- Crime and Disorder (Formulation and Implementation of Strategy) (Wales) Regulations 2007 (S.I. 2007/3076)
- Merchant Shipping and Fishing Vessels (Control of Vibration at Work) Regulations 2007 (S.I. 2007/3077)
- Substance Misuse (Formulation and Implementation of Strategy) (Wales) Regulations 2007 (S.I. 2007/3078)
- Fuel-testing Pilot Projects (Biobutanol Project) Regulations 2007 (S.I. 2007/3098)
- Value Added Tax (Amendment) (No. 7) Regulations 2007 (S.I. 2007/3099)
- Merchant Shipping and Fishing Vessels (Health and Safety at Work) (Carcinogens and Mutagens) Regulations 2007 (S.I. 2007/3100)

== 3101–3200 ==
- European Qualifications (Health and Social Care Professions) Regulations 2007 (S.I. 2007/3101)
- Asylum Support (Prescribed Period following Appeal) Regulations 2007 (S.I. 2007/3102)
- Tax Avoidance Schemes (Information) (Amendment) (No. 2) Regulations 2007 (S.I. 2007/3103)
- Tax Avoidance Schemes (Penalty) Regulations 2007 (S.I. 2007/3104)
- Agricultural Land Tribunals (Rules) Order 2007 (S.I. 2007/3105)
- Persistent Organic Pollutants Regulations 2007 (S.I. 2007/3106)
- Greater London Authority Act 2007 (Commencement No.1 and Appointed Day) Order 2007 (S.I. 2007/3107)
- Road Vehicles (Construction and Use) (Amendment) (No. 3) Regulations 2007 (S.I. 2007/3132)
- Plant Health (England) (Amendment) (No. 3) Order 2007 (S.I. 2007/3133)
- Nursing and Midwifery Council (Election Scheme) (Amendment) Rules Order of Council 2007 (S.I. 2007/3134)
- Motor Vehicles (EC Type Approval) (Amendment No. 2) Regulations 2007 (S.I. 2007/3135)
- Local Government and Public Involvement in Health Act 2007 (Commencement No. 1 and Savings) Order 2007 (S.I. 2007/3136)
- British Nationality (General and Hong Kong) (Amendment) Regulations 2007 (S.I. 2007/3137)
- Immigration, Asylum and Nationality Act 2006 (Commencement No. 7) Order 2007 (S.I. 2007/3138)
- British Nationality (British Overseas Territories) Regulations 2007 (S.I. 2007/3139)
- Import and Export Restrictions (Foot-and-Mouth Disease) (No. 6) (Wales) Regulations 2007 (S.I. 2007/3140)
- PPP Administration Order Rules 2007 (S.I. 2007/3141)
- Import and Export Restrictions (Foot-and-Mouth Disease) (No. 6) Regulations 2007 (S.I. 2007/3142)
- Community Drivers' Hours and Working Time (Foot-and-Mouth Disease) (Temporary Exception) (Amendment) Regulations 2007 (S.I. 2007/3143)
- York Hospitals NHS Foundation Trust (Transfer of Trust Property) Order 2007 (S.I. 2007/3144)
- Scarborough and North East Yorkshire Health Care National Health Service Trust (Transfer of Trust Property) Order 2007 (S.I. 2007/3145)
- Harrogate and District NHS Foundation Trust (Transfer of Trust Property) Order 2007 (S.I. 2007/3146)
- South Tees Hospitals National Health Service Trust (Transfer of Trust Property) Order 2007 (S.I. 2007/3147)
- Industrial Training (Film Industry Training Board for England and Wales) Order 2007 (S.I. 2007/3148)
- Prison (Amendment No. 2) Rules 2007 (S.I. 2007/3149)
- Bluetongue (Wales) Order 2007 (S.I. 2007/3150)
- Mobile Homes Act 1983 (Amendment of Schedule 1) (Wales) Order 2007 (S.I. 2007/3151)
- Administration Charges (Summary of Rights and Obligations) (Wales) Regulations 2007 (S.I. 2007/3152)
- Rating Lists (Valuation Date) (Wales) Order 2007 (S.I. 2007/3153)
- Bluetongue Order 2007 (S.I. 2007/3154)
- Gambling Act 2005 (Commencement No. 7) Order 2007 (S.I. 2007/3155)
- Stebbing Green (Revocation of Parish Council Byelaws) Order 2007 (S.I. 2007/3156)
- Gambling Act 2005 (Temporary Use Notices) Regulations 2007 (S.I. 2007/3157)
- Air Navigation (Dangerous Goods) (Amendment) (No. 2) Regulations 2007 (S.I. 2007/3159)
- Service Charges (Summary of Rights and Obligations, and Transitional Provisions) (Wales) Regulations 2007 (S.I. 2007/3160)
- Commonhold and Leasehold Reform Act 2002 (Commencement No. 4) (Wales) Order 2007 (S.I. 2007/3161)
- Administration Charges (Summary of Rights and Obligations) (Wales) Regulations 2007 (S.I. 2007/3162)
- Caravan Sites Act 1968 (Amendment) (Wales) Order 2007 (S.I. 2007/3163)
- Mobile Homes (Written Statement) (Wales) Regulations 2007 (S.I. 2007/3164)
- Natural Mineral Water, Spring Water and Bottled Drinking Water (Wales) Regulations 2007 (S.I. 2007/3165)
- Finance Act 2007 (Sections 82 to 84 and Schedule 23) (Commencement) Order 2007 (S.I. 2007/3166)
- Zootechnical Standards (Amendment) (England) Regulations 2007 (S.I. 2007/3167)
- General Medical Council (Fitness to Practise) (Amendments in Relation to Undertakings) Rules Order of Council 2007 (S.I. 2007/3168)
- Community Legal Service (Funding) (Counsel in Family Proceedings) (Amendment No. 2) Order 2007 (S.I. 2007/3169)
- Asylum and Immigration Tribunal (Procedure) (Amendment No. 2) Rules 2007 (S.I. 2007/3170)
- Feed (Specified Undesirable Substances) (Wales) Regulations 2007 (S.I. 2007/3171)
- General Dental Council (Constitution) (Amendment) Order of Council 2007 (S.I. 2007/3172)
- Feed (Corn Gluten Feed and Brewers Grains) (Emergency Control) (Wales) (Revocation) Regulations 2007 (S.I. 2007/3173)
- Traffic Management Act 2004 (Commencement No. 2 and Transitional Provisions) (Wales) Order 2007 (S.I. 2007/3174)
- Police and Criminal Evidence Act 1984 (Application to Revenue and Customs) Order 2007 (S.I. 2007/3175)
- Road Traffic (Permitted Parking Area and Special Parking Area) (County of Hertfordshire) (Borough of Watford) (Amendment) Order 2007 (S.I. 2007/3181)
- Common Agricultural Policy Single Payment and Support Schemes (Amendment) Regulations 2007 (S.I. 2007/3182)
- Social Security (Housing Costs and Miscellaneous Amendments) Regulations 2007 (S.I. 2007/3183)
- Traffic Management Act 2004 (Commencement No.6) (England) Order 2007 (S.I. 2007/3184)
- Official Feed and Food Controls (England) Regulations 2007 (S.I. 2007/3185)
- Corporation Tax (Implementation of the Mergers Directive) Regulations 2007 (S.I. 2007/3186)
- Asylum (Procedures) Regulations 2007 (S.I. 2007/3187)
- Fire and Rescue Services (Emergencies) (Wales) Order 2007 (S.I. 2007/3193)
- District of Newark and Sherwood (Electoral Changes) (Amendment) Order 2007 (S.I. 2007/3200)

== 3201–3300 ==
- A20 Trunk Road (Dover Eastern Docks Exit Road) Slip Road Order 2007 (S.I. 2007/3201)
- Police Reform Act 2002 (Standard Powers and Duties of Community Support Officers) Order 2007 (S.I. 2007/3202)
- Police and Justice Act 2006 (Commencement No. 6) Order 2007 (S.I. 2007/3203)
- Crouch Harbour Authority (Constitution) Harbour Revision Order 2007 (S.I. 2007/3204)
- Harbour School Order 2007 (S.I. 2007/3205)
- Education (Admissions Appeals Arrangements) (England) (Amendment) Regulations 2007 (S.I. 2007/3206)
- Felixstowe Dock and Railway Harbour Revision Order 2007 (S.I. 2007/3219)
- Young Offender Institution (Amendment No. 2) Rules 2007 (S.I. 2007/3220)
- Secretaries of State for Children, Schools and Families, for Innovation, Universities and Skills and for Business, Enterprise and Regulatory Reform Order 2007 (S.I. 2007/3224)
- Education (Chief Inspector of Education and Training in Wales) (No. 2) Order 2007 (S.I. 2007/3225)
- Education (Chief Inspector of Education and Training in Wales) (No. 3) Order 2007 (S.I. 2007/3226)
- European Communities (Definition of Treaties) (Partnership and Cooperation Agreement) (Republic of Tajikistan) Order 2007 (S.I. 2007/3227)
- Inspectors of Education, Children's Services and Skills (No. 6) Order 2007 (S.I. 2007/3228)
- Licensing and Management of Houses in Multiple Occupation (Additional Provisions) (Wales) Regulations 2007 (S.I. 2007/3229)
- Assembly Learning Grants and Loans (Higher Education) (Wales) (Amendment) (No. 3) Regulations 2007 (S.I. 2007/3230)
- Houses in Multiple Occupation (Certain Blocks of Flats) (Modifications to the Housing Act 2004 and Transitional Provisions for section 257 HMOs) (Wales) Regulations 2007 (S.I. 2007/3231)
- Housing Act 2004 (Commencement No 5) (Wales) Order 2007 (S.I. 2007/3232)
- M25 (Junction 14, Terminal 5 Spur Roads) (Speed Limit) Regulations 2007 (S.I. 2007/3233)
- East Kent Railway Order 2007 (S.I. 2007/3234)
- Housing (Assessment of Accommodation Needs) (Meaning of Gypsies and Travellers) (Wales) Regulations 2007 (S.I. 2007/3235)
- Radioactive Contaminated Land Regulations (Northern Ireland) (Amendment) Regulations 2007 (S.I. 2007/3236)
- Radioactive Contaminated Land (Scotland) (Amendment) Regulations 2007 (S.I. 2007/3240)
- Radioactive Contaminated Land (Modification of Enactments) (England) (Amendment) Regulations 2007 (S.I. 2007/3245)
- Radioactive Contaminated Land (Modification of Enactments) (Wales) (Amendment) Regulations 2007 (S.I. 2007/3250)
- Police and Justice Act 2006 (Commencement No. 1) (Wales) Order 2007 (S.I. 2007/3251)
- Materials and Articles in Contact with Food (Wales) Regulations 2007 (S.I. 2007/3252)
- Reinsurance Directive Regulations 2007 (S.I. 2007/3253)
- Financial Services and Markets Act 2000 (Reinsurance Directive) Order 2007 (S.I. 2007/3254)
- Financial Services and Markets Act 2000 (Reinsurance Directive) Regulations 2007 (S.I. 2007/3255)
- Food Labelling (Declaration of Allergens) (England) Regulations 2007 (S.I. 2007/3256)
- Town and Country Planning (Regions) (New Forest National Park) (England) Order 2007 (S.I. 2007/3276)
- Animals and Animal Products (Import and Export) (England) (Amendment) Regulations 2007 (S.I. 2007/3277)
- Energy-Saving Items (Income Tax) Regulations 2007 (S.I. 2007/3278)
- Animals and Animal Products (Import and Export) (Wales) (Amendment) Regulations 2007 (S.I. 2007/3279)
- National Health Service (Pension Scheme, Injury Benefits, Additional Voluntary Contributions and Compensation for Premature Retirement) Amendment Regulations 2007 (S.I. 2007/3280)
- Medicines (Pharmacies) (Applications for Registration and Fees) Amendment Regulations 2007 (S.I. 2007/3282)
- Police Act 1997 (Criminal Records) (Registration) Regulations (Northern Ireland) 2007 (S.I. 2007/3283)
- Grants for Fishing and Aquaculture Industries Regulations 2007 (S.I. 2007/3284)
- Disability Discrimination Act 2005 (Commencement No. 1) (Wales) Order 2007 (S.I. 2007/3285)
- Charities Act 2006 (Commencement No. 2, Transitional Provisions and Savings) Order 2007 (S.I. 2007/3286)
- Proceeds of Crime Act 2002 (Business in the Regulated Sector and Supervisory Authorities) Order 2007 (S.I. 2007/3287)
- Terrorism Act 2000 (Business in the Regulated Sector and Supervisory Authorities) Order 2007 (S.I. 2007/3288)
- National Health Service (Optical Charges and Payments) Amendment (No. 2) Regulations 2007 (S.I. 2007/3289)
- Immigration (Restrictions on Employment) Order 2007 (S.I. 2007/3290)
- Patents Rules 2007 (S.I. 2007/3291)
- Patents (Fees) Rules 2007 (S.I. 2007/3292)
- Patents (Compulsory Licensing and Supplementary Protection Certificates) Regulations 2007 (S.I. 2007/3293)
- Official Feed and Food Controls (Wales) Regulations 2007 (S.I. 2007/3294)
- Export and Movement Restrictions (Foot-and-Mouth Disease) Regulations 2007 (S.I. 2007/3295)
- Export and Movement Restrictions (Foot-and-Mouth Disease) (Wales) Regulations 2007 (S.I. 2007/3296)
- Pesticides (Maximum Residue Levels in Crops, Food and Feeding Stuffs) (England and Wales) (Amendment) (No. 4) Regulations 2007 (S.I. 2007/3297)
- Transfer of Funds (Information on the Payer) Regulations 2007 (S.I. 2007/3298)
- Money Laundering (Amendment) Regulations 2007 (S.I. 2007/3299). Amended the earlier 2007 Regulations (S.I. 2007/2157)
- Consumer Credit Act 2006 (Commencement No. 3) Order 2007 (S.I. 2007/3300)

== 3301–3400 ==
- Home Information Pack (Amendment) Regulations 2007 (S.I. 2007/3301)
- Energy Performance of Buildings (Certificates and Inspections) (England and Wales) (Amendment No. 2) Regulations 2007 (S.I. 2007/3302)
- Avian Influenza (H5N1) (Miscellaneous Amendments) Order 2007 (S.I. 2007/3303)
- Bluetongue (No. 2) Order 2007 (S.I. 2007/3304)
- Plant Health (Wales) (Amendment) (No. 2) Order 2007 (S.I. 2007/3305)
- Plant Health (Import Inspection Fees) (Wales) (Amendment) (No.2) Regulations 2007 (S.I. 2007/3306)
- Biofuels and Hydrocarbon Oil Duties (Miscellaneous Amendments) Regulations 2007 (S.I. 2007/3307)
- Housing Act 2004 (Commencement No. 10) (England and Wales) Order 2007 (S.I. 2007/3308)
- Bluetongue (No. 2) (Wales) Order 2007 (S.I. 2007/3309)
- Securitisation Companies (Application of Section 83(1) of the Finance Act 2005: Accounting Standards) Regulations 2007 (S.I. 2007/3338)
- Taxation of Securitisation Companies (Amendment) Regulations 2007 (S.I. 2007/3339)
- Criminal Justice Act 2003 (Commencement No. 18) Order 2007 (S.I. 2007/3340)
- Serious Organised Crime and Police Act 2005 (Commencement No. 11) Order 2007 (S.I. 2007/3341)
- Police Act 1997 (Commencement No. 10) Order 2007 (S.I. 2007/3342)
- Non-Domestic Rating Contributions (Wales) (Amendment) Regulations 2007 (S.I. 2007/3343)
- Education (Student Support) (European Institutions) (Amendment) Regulations 2007 (S.I. 2007/3344)
- Felixstowe Dock and Railway Company (Land Acquisition) Order 2007 (S.I. 2007/3345)
- Armed Forces (Service Complaints Commissioner) Regulations 2007 (S.I. 2007/3352)
- Armed Forces (Redress of Individual Grievances) Regulations 2007 (S.I. 2007/3353)
- Non-Domestic Rating (Unoccupied Property) (Amendment) (Wales) Regulations 2007 (S.I. 2007/3354)
- Contaminants in Food (Wales) (Amendment) Regulations 2007 (S.I. 2007/3368)
- Occupational Pensions (Revaluation) Order 2007 (S.I. 2007/3369)
- Special Immigration Appeals Commission (Procedure) (Amendment No. 2) Rules 2007 (S.I. 2007/3370)
- Clean Neighbourhoods and Environment Act 2005 (Commencement No. 3) (Wales) Order 2007 (S.I. 2007/3371)
- Traffic Management Permit Scheme (England) Regulations 2007 (S.I. 2007/3372)
- Education (Information About Individual Pupils) (England) (Amendment) Regulations 2007 (S.I. 2007/3373)
- Water Supply (Water Quality) Regulations 2001 (Amendment) Regulations 2007 (S.I. 2007/3374)
- Avian Influenza (H5N1) (Miscellaneous Amendments) (Wales) Order 2007 (S.I. 2007/3375)
- Electoral Administration Act 2006 (Commencement No. 5) Order 2007 (S.I. 2007/3376)
- Proscribed Organisations Appeal Commission (Procedure) (Amendment) Rules 2007 (S.I. 2007/3377)
- Designs (International Registrations Designating the European Community) Regulations 2007 (S.I. 2007/3378)
- Food Labelling (Declaration of Allergens) (Wales) Regulations 2007 (S.I. 2007/3379)
- Wireless Telegraphy (Licence Award) (No. 2) Regulations 2007 (S.I. 2007/3380)
- Wireless Telegraphy (Limitation of Number of Spectrum Access Licences) (No. 2) Order 2007 (S.I. 2007/3381)
- Army Terms of Service Regulations 2007 (S.I. 2007/3382)
- Army Act 1955 (Part 1) (Regular Army) Regulations 1992 (Amendment) Regulations 2007 (S.I. 2007/3383)
- Designs (International Registrations Designating the European Community) Regulations 2007 (S.I. 2007/3384)
- Meat (Official Controls Charges) (England) (No. 2) Regulations 2007 (S.I. 2007/3385)
- Railways (Interoperability) (Amendment) Regulations 2007 (S.I. 2007/3386)
- Wireless Telegraphy (Spectrum Trading) (Amendment) (No. 2) Regulations 2007 (S.I. 2007/3387)
- Statistics and Registration Service Act 2007 (Commencement No. 1) Order 2007 (S.I. 2007/3388)
- Wireless Telegraphy (Register) (Amendment) (No. 2) Regulations 2007 (S.I. 2007/3389)
- Supply of Information (Register of Deaths) (Northern Ireland) Regulations 2007 (S.I. 2007/3390)
- Registration of Births, Deaths and Marriages (Amendment) No.2 Regulations 2007 (S.I. 2007/3391)
- Fishery Products (Official Controls Charges) (England) Regulations 2007 (S.I. 2007/3392)
- Non-Domestic Rating Contributions (England) (Amendment) Regulations 2007 (S.I. 2007/3393)
- A435 Trunk Road (Warwickshire and Worcestershire) (Detrunking) Order 2007 (S.I. 2007/3394)
- A446 Trunk Road (Bassetts Pole, Staffordshire to M6 Junction 4, Coleshill, Warwickshire) (Detrunking) Order 2007 (S.I. 2007/3395)
- Patents Act 2004 (Commencement No. 4 and Transitional Provisions) Order 2007 (S.I. 2007/3396)
- Terrorism Act 2000 and Proceeds of Crime Act 2002 (Amendment) Regulations 2007 (S.I. 2007/3398)
- Non-Domestic Rating (Demand Notices) (Wales) (Amendment) Regulations 2007 (S.I. 2007/3399)

== 3401–3500 ==
- Taxation of Securitisation Companies (Amendment No. 2) Regulations 2007 (S.I. 2007/3401)
- Taxation of Insurance Securitisation Companies Regulations 2007 (S.I. 2007/3402)
- Primary Care Trusts (Establishment and Dissolution) (England) Amendment (No. 3) Order 2007 (S.I. 2007/3403)
- North Tees Primary Care Trust (Change of Name) Order 2007 (S.I. 2007/3417)
- Cheltenham (Parishes) (Amendment) Order 2007 (S.I. 2007/3421)
- East Devon (Parishes) Order 2007 (S.I. 2007/3422)
- National Park Authorities (Wales) (Amendment) Order 2007 (S.I. 2007/3423)
- Finance (No. 2) Act 2005, Section 13 (Corporation Tax Exemption for Scientific Research Organisations) (Appointed Day) Order 2007 (S.I. 2007/3424)
- Real Estate Investment Trusts (Joint Venture Groups) Regulations 2007 (S.I. 2007/3425)
- Scientific Research Organisations Regulations 2007 (S.I. 2007/3426)
- Drinking Milk (Amendment) (England) Regulations 2007 (S.I. 2007/3428)
- Milk and Milk Products (Pupils in Educational Establishments) (England) (Amendment) Regulations 2007 (S.I. 2007/3429)
- Insurance Companies (Taxation of Reinsurance Business) (Corporation Tax Acts) (Amendment) Order 2007 (S.I. 2007/3430)
- Loan Relationships and Derivative Contracts (Disregard and Bringing into Account of Profits and Losses) (Amendment No. 2) Regulations 2007 (S.I. 2007/3431)
- Loan Relationships and Derivative Contracts (Change of Accounting Practice) (Amendment) (No. 2) Regulations 2007 (S.I. 2007/3432)
- Greenhouse Gas Emissions Trading Scheme (Amendment No. 2) Regulations 2007 (S.I. 2007/3433)
- Armed Forces Act 2001 (Commencement No.9) Order 2007 (S.I. 2007/3434)
- Export and Movement Restrictions (Foot-and-Mouth Disease) (No.2) Regulations 2007 (S.I. 2007/3435)
- Education (Provision of Information About Young Children) (England) (Amendment) Regulations 2007 (S.I. 2007/3436)
- Stamp Duty Land Tax (Zero-Carbon Homes Relief) Regulations 2007 (S.I. 2007/3437)
- Controls on Dangerous Substances and Preparations (Amendment) (No. 2) Regulations 2007 (S.I. 2007/3438)
- Veterinary Surgeons and Veterinary Practitioners (Registration) (Amendment) Regulations Order of Council 2007 (S.I. 2007/3439)
- Immigration (Designation of Travel Bans) (Amendment) Order 2007 (S.I. 2007/3440)
- Export and Movement Restrictions (Foot-and-Mouth Disease) (No. 2) (Wales) Regulations 2007 (S.I. 2007/3441)
- Courts-Martial (Army) Rules 2007 (S.I. 2007/3442)
- Courts-Martial (Royal Navy) Rules 2007 (S.I. 2007/3443)
- Courts-Martial (Royal Air Force) Rules 2007 (S.I. 2007/3444)
- Insurance Companies (Overseas Life Assurance Business) (Excluded Business) (Amendment No. 2) Regulations 2007 (S.I. 2007/3445)
- Immigration, Asylum and Nationality Act 2006 (Data Sharing Code of Practice) (Revocation) Order 2007 (S.I. 2007/3447)
- Value Added Tax (Reduced Rate) (No. 2) Order 2007 (S.I. 2007/3448)
- Overseas Life Insurance Companies (Amendment No. 2) Regulations 2007 (S.I. 2007/3449)
- Plant Health (Forestry) (Phytophthora ramorum) (Great Britain) (Amendment) Order 2007 (S.I. 2007/3450)
- Criminal Justice Act 2003 (Commencement No. 18 and Transitional Provisions) Order 2007 (S.I. 2007/3451)
- Cosmetic Products (Safety) (Amendment) (No. 3) Regulations 2007 (S.I. 2007/3452)
- Private Hire Vehicles (London) (Transitional Provisions) (Amendment) Regulations 2007 (S.I. 2007/3453)
- Waste Electrical and Electronic Equipment (Amendment) Regulations 2007 (S.I. 2007/3454)
- Supply of Information (Register of Deaths) Regulations 2007 (S.I. 2007/3460)
- Meat (Official Controls Charges) (Wales) (No. 2) Regulations 2007 (S.I. 2007/3461)
- Fishery Products (Official Controls Charges) (Wales) Regulations 2007 (S.I. 2007/3462)
- Maryport Harbour Revision Order 2007 (SI 2007/3463)
- School Organisation and Governance (Amendment) (England) Regulations 2007 (S.I. 2007/3464)
- Double Taxation Relief (Taxes on Income) (Switzerland) Order 2007 (S.I. 2007/3465)
- Public Records (Technology Strategy Board) Order 2007 (S.I. 2007/3466)
- Air Navigation (Amendment) (No. 2) Order 2007 (S.I. 2007/3467)
- Air Navigation (Overseas Territories) Order 2007 (S.I. 2007/3468)
- Double Taxation Relief and International Tax Enforcement (Taxes on Income and Capital) (Faroes) Order 2007 (S.I. 2007/3469)
- Parliamentary Commissioner Order 2007 (S.I. 2007/3470)
- European Communities (Designation) (No. 5) Order 2007 (S.I. 2007/3471)
- Digital Switchover (Disclosure of Information) (Isle of Man) Order 2007 (S.I. 2007/3472)
- Salisbury College (Dissolution) Order 2007 (S.I. 2007/3473)
- Fire and Rescue Services (Appointment of Inspector) Order 2007 (S.I. 2007/3474)
- School Organisation (Removal of Foundation, Reduction in Number of Foundation Governors and Ability of Foundation to Pay Debts) (England) Regulations 2007 (S.I. 2007/3475)
- Waste and Air Pollution (Miscellaneous Amendments) Regulations 2007 (S.I. 2007/3476)
- Private Hire Vehicles (Carriage of Guide Dogs etc.) Act 2002 (Commencement No. 1) (Northern Ireland) Order 2007 (S.I. 2007/3477)
- Films (Certification) (Amendment) Regulations 2007 (S.I. 2007/3478)
- Energy Act 2004 (Designation of Publicly Owned Companies) Order 2007 (S.I. 2007/3479)
- Criminal Proceedings etc. (Reform) (Scotland) Act 2007 (Powers of District and JP Courts) Order 2007 (S.I. 2007/3480)
- Income Tax (Indexation) (No. 2) Order 2007 (S.I. 2007/3481)
- Civil Enforcement of Parking Contraventions (England) Representations and Appeals Regulations S.I. 2007/2007)
- Civil Enforcement of Parking Contraventions (England) General Regulations 2007 (S.I. 2007/3483)
- Removal and Disposal of Vehicles (Amendment) (England) Regulations 2007 (S.I. 2007/3484)
- Civil Enforcement Officers (Wearing of Uniforms) (England) Regulations 2007 (S.I. 2007/3485)
- Civil Enforcement of Parking Contraventions (Approved Devices) (England) Order 2007 (S.I. 2007/3486)
- Civil Enforcement of Parking Contraventions (Guidelines on Levels of Charges) (England) Order 2007 (S.I. 2007/3487)
- Damages for Bereavement (Variation of Sum) (Northern Ireland) Order 2007 (S.I. 2007/3488)
- Damages for Bereavement (Variation of Sum) (England and Wales) Order 2007 (S.I. 2007/3489)
- Childcare Act 2006 (Provision of Information to Parents) (England) Regulations 2007 (S.I. 2007/3490)
- National Health Service (Primary Medical Services) (Miscellaneous Amendments) Regulations 2007 (S.I. 2007/3491)
- Road Safety Act 2006 (Commencement No. 2)(England and Wales) Order 2007 (S.I. 2007/3492)
- Sheep and Goats (Records, Identification and Movement) (England) Order 2007 (S.I. 2007/3493)
- Statutory Auditors and Third Country Auditors Regulations 2007 (S.I. 2007/3494)
- Companies Act 2006 (Commencement No. 5, Transitional Provisions and Savings) Order 2007 (S.I. 2007/3495)
- Severn Bridges Tolls Order 2007 (S.I. 2007/3496)

== 3501–3600 ==
- Further Education and Training Act 2007 (Commencement No. 1 and Transitional Provisions) Order 2007 (S.I. 2007/3505)
- Income Tax Act 2007 (Amendment) (No. 3) Order 2007 (S.I. 2007/3506)
- Recovery of Foreign Taxes Regulations 2007 (S.I. 2007/3507)
- Recovery of Duties and Taxes Etc. Due in Other Member States (Corresponding UK Claims, Procedure and Supplementary) (Amendment) Regulations 2007 (S.I. 2007/3508)
- Financial Services and Markets Act 2000 (Regulated Activities) (Amendment) (No. 2) Order 2007 (S.I. 2007/3510)
- Pensions Act 2007 (Commencement No. 2) Order 2007 (S.I. 2007/3512)
- Export Restrictions (Foot-and-Mouth Disease) Regulations 2007 (S.I. 2007/3513)
- Land Registration (Proper Office) Order 2007 (S.I. 2007/3517)
- Export Restrictions (Foot-and-Mouth Disease) (Wales) Regulations 2007 (S.I. 2007/3518)
- Mid Kent Water and South East Water (Amendment of Local Enactments and Supplemental Provisions) Order 2007 (S.I. 2007/3520)
- Infant Formula and Follow-on Formula (England) Regulations 2007 (S.I. 2007/3521)
- Channel Tunnel (Safety) Order 2007 (S.I. 2007/3531)
- Registered Pension Schemes (Authorised Member Payments) Regulations 2007 (S.I. 2007/3532)
- Registered Pension Schemes (Meaning of Pension Commencement Lump Sum) (Amendment) Regulations 2007 (S.I. 2007/3533)
- Independent Supervisor Appointment Order 2007 (S.I. 2007/3534)
- Companies (Fees for Inspection and Copying of Company Records) (No. 2) Regulations 2007 (S.I. 2007/3535)
- Real Estate Investment Trusts (Financial Statements of Group Real Estate Investment Trusts) (Amendment) Regulations 2007 (S.I. 2007/3536)
- Employer-Financed Retirement Benefits (Excluded Benefits for Tax Purposes) Regulations 2007 (S.I. 2007/3537)
- Environmental Permitting (England and Wales) Regulations 2007 (S.I. 2007/3538)
- Gambling Act 2005 (Premises Licences) (Review) (Amendment) Regulations 2007 (S.I. 2007/3539)
- Real Estate Investment Trusts (Breach of Conditions) (Amendment) Regulations 2007 (S.I. 2007/3540)
- Greater London Authority Elections Rules 2007 (S.I. 20073541)
- Public Contracts and Utilities Contracts (Amendment) Regulations 2007 (S.I. 2007/3542)
- Civil Procedure (Amendment No.2) Rules 2007 (S.I. 2007/3543)
- Legislative and Regulatory Reform (Regulatory Functions) Order 2007 (S.I. 2007/3544)
- Safeguarding Vulnerable Groups Act 2006 (Commencement No. 1) Order 2007 (S.I. 2007/3545)
- Consumers, Estate Agents and Redress Act 2007 (Commencement No. 2) Order 2007 (S.I. 2007/3546)
- Legislative and Regulatory Reform Code of Practice (Appointed Day) Order 2007 (S.I. 2007/3548)
- All Saints Catholic Primary School, Bootle (Designation as having a Religious Character) Order 2007 (S.I. 2007/3549)
- Criminal Defence Service (General) (No. 2) (Amendment No. 3) Regulations 2007 (S.I. 2007/3550)
- Holy Rood Catholic Primary School (Designation as having a Religious Character) Order 2007 (S.I. 2007/3551)
- Criminal Defence Service (Funding) (Amendment) Order 2007 (S.I. 2007/3552)
- Road Traffic (Permitted Parking Area and Special Parking Area) (Royal Borough of Windsor and Maidenhead) Order 2007 (S.I. 2007/3553)
- Bus Lane Contraventions (Approved Local Authorities) (England) (Amendment) (No. 8) Order 2007 (S.I. 2007/3554)
- Equality Act 2006 (Dissolution of Commissions and Consequential and Transitional Provisions) (Amendment) Order 2007 (S.I. 2007/3555)
- Civil Aviation (Allocation of Scarce Capacity) Regulations 2007 (S.I. 2007/3556)
- Holy Trinity CE VC Primary School & Nursery Unit (Designation as having a Religious Character) Order 2007 (S.I. 2007/3557)
- Knaresborough St John's CofE Primary School (Designation as having a Religious Character) Order 2007 (S.I. 2007/3558)
- Offshore Installations (Safety Zones) (No. 7) Order 2007 (S.I. 2007/3559)
- Lulworth and Winfrith CE VC First School (Designation as having a Religious Character) Order 2007 (S.I. 2007/3560)
- Madani Muslim High School (VA) (Designation as having a Religious Character) Order 2007 (S.I. 2007/3561)
- Education (School Performance Information) (Wales) (Amendment) Regulations 2007 (S.I. 2007/3564)
- Road Traffic (Permitted Parking Area and Special Parking Area) (County of Cheshire) (Borough of Crewe and Nantwich) Order 2007 (S.I. 2007/3566)
- Manchester Mesivta School (Designation as having a Religious Character) Order 2007 (S.I. 2007/3567)
- Slough Islamic School (Designation as having a Religious Character) Order 2007 (S.I. 2007/3568)
- St Joseph's Catholic and Church of England Primary School (Designation as having a Religious Character) Order 2007 (S.I. 2007/3569)
- Employment Rights (Increase of Limits) Order 2007 (S.I. 2007/3570)
- St Peter's CE Primary School (Designation as having a Religious Character) Order 2007 (S.I. 2007/3571)
- Stanwell Fields C of E Primary School (Designation as having a Religious Character) Order 2007 (S.I. 2007/3572)
- Infant Formula and Follow-on Formula (Wales) Regulations 2007 (S.I. 2007/3573)
- Control of Salmonella in Poultry Order 2007 (S.I. 2007/3574)
- Conduct of Employment Agencies and Employment Businesses (Amendment) Regulations 2007 (S.I. 2007/3575)
- Maidstone (Parishes) Order 2007 (S.I. 2007/3576)
- Tewkesbury (Parishes) Order 2007 (S.I. 2007/3577)
- Ellesmere Port and Neston (Parish) Order 2007 (S.I. 2007/3578)
- Channel Tunnel (International Arrangements and Miscellaneous Provisions) (Amendment) Order 2007 (S.I. 2007/3579)
- Immigration, Asylum and Nationality Act 2006 (Commencement No. 7) (Amendment) Order 2007 (S.I. 2007/3580)
- Financial Assistance Scheme (Miscellaneous Amendments) Regulations 2007 (S.I. 2007/3581)
- Solicitors (Disciplinary Proceedings) Rules 2007 (S.I. 2007/3588)

== 3601–3700 ==
- A46 Trunk Road (A46/M40 Junction 15 (Longbridge) Bypass) (Detrunking) Order 2007 (S.I. 2007/3609)
- A46 Trunk Road (A46/M40 Junction 15 (Longbridge) Bypass) Order 2007 (S.I. 2007/3610)
- Education Act 2002 (Commencement No. 11 and Transitional and Savings Provisions) (Wales) Order 2007 (S.I. 2007/3611)
- General Commissioners and Special Commissioners (Jurisdiction and Procedure) (Amendment) Regulations 2007 (S.I. 2007/3612)
- Tribunals, Courts and Enforcement Act 2007 (Commencement No. 2) Order 2007 (S.I. 2007/3613)
- Compulsory Purchase (Inquiries Procedure) Rules 2007 (S.I. 2007/3617)
- European Regional Development Fund (West Midlands Operational Programme) (Implementation) Regulations 2007 (S.I. 2007/3618)
- European Regional Development Fund (Yorkshire and the Humber Operational Programme) (Implementation) Regulations 2007 (S.I. 2007/3619)
- European Regional Development Fund (South East Operational Programme) (Implementation) Regulations 2007 (S.I. 2007/3620)
- European Regional Development Fund (North East Operational Programme) (Implementation) Regulations 2007 (S.I. 2007/3621)
- European Regional Development Fund (North West Operational Programme) (Implementation) Regulations 2007 (S.I. 2007/3622)
- European Regional Development Fund (South West Operational Programmes) (Implementation) Regulations 2007 (S.I. 2007/3623)
- European Regional Development Fund (East of England Operational Programme) (Implementation) Regulations 2007 (S.I. 2007/3624)
- European Regional Development Fund (East Midlands Operational Programme) (Implementation) Regulations 2007 (S.I. 2007/3625)
- Criminal Procedure (Amendment No. 3) Rules 2007 (S.I. 2007/3662)

== See also ==
- List of statutory instruments of the United Kingdom
