= List of statutory instruments of the United Kingdom, 2006 =

This is an incomplete list of statutory instruments of the United Kingdom in 2006.

== 1–100 ==
- Public Contracts Regulations 2006 (S.I. 2006/5)
- Utilities Contracts Regulations 2006 (S.I. 2006/6)
- M6 Motorway (Junction 36, Town Head Bridge Parapet Upgrade) (Temporary Restriction of Traffic) Order 2006 (S.I. 2006/7)
- Food Hygiene (England) Regulations 2006 (S.I. 2006/14)
- Official Feed and Food Controls (England) Regulations 2006 (S.I. 2005/15)
- Occupational Pension Schemes (Consultation by Employers) (Modification for Multi-employer Schemes) Regulations 2006 (S.I. 2006/16)
- Community Drivers' Hours and Working Time (Road Tankers) (Temporary Exception) Regulations 2006 (S.I. 2006/17)
- Performances (Moral Rights, etc.) Regulations 2006 (S.I. 2006/18)
- Non-Road Mobile Machinery (Emission of Gaseous and Particulate Pollutants) (Amendment) Regulations 2006 (S.I. 2006/29)
- Education (Information About Individual Pupils) (Wales) (Amendment) Regulations 2006 (S.I. 2006/30)
- Food Hygiene (Wales) Regulations 2006 (S.I. 2006/31)
- Occupational Pension Schemes (Early Leavers: Cash Transfer Sums and Contribution Refunds) Regulations 2006 (S.I. 2006/33)
- Occupational Pension Schemes (Transfer Values etc.) (Coal Staff and Mineworkers' Schemes) (Amendment) Regulations 2006 (S.I. 2006/34)
- Copyright (Certification of Licensing Scheme for Educational Recording of Broadcasts and Cable Programmes) (Educational Recording Agency Limited) (Revocation) Order 2006 (S.I. 2006/35)
- Tir Cynnal (Wales) Regulations 2006 (S.I. 2006/41)
- Public Rights of Way (Registers) (Wales) Regulations 2006 (S.I. 2006/42)
- Financial Markets and Insolvency (Settlement Finality) (Amendment) Regulations 2006 (S.I. 2006/50)
- Higher Education Act 2004 (Commencement No. 4) Order 2006 (S.I. 2006/51)
- Income-related Benefits (Subsidy to Authorities) Amendment Order 2006 (S.I. 2006/54)
- Armed Forces Redundancy Scheme Order 2006 (S.I. 2006/55)
- Proceeds of Crime Act 2002 (References to Financial Investigators) (Amendment) Order 2006 (S.I. 2006/57)
- Financial Services and Markets Act 2000 (Designated Professional Bodies) (Amendment) Order 2006 (S.I. 2006/58)
- Climate Change Agreements (Energy–intensive Installations) Regulations 2006 (S.I. 2006/59)
- Climate Change Agreements (Eligible Facilities) Regulations 2006 (S.I. 2006/60)
- Stratford-on-Avon (Parishes) (Amendment) Order 2006 (S.I. 2006/61)
- Older Cattle (Disposal) (Wales) Regulations 2006 (S.I. 2006/62)
- Historic Buildings Council for Wales (Abolition) Order 2006 (S.I. 2006/63)
- Ancient Monuments Board for Wales (Abolition) Order 2006 (S.I. 2006/64)
- Transmissible Spongiform Encephalopathies Regulations 2006 (S.I. 2006/68)
- Local Authorities (Executive Arrangements) (Access to Information) (Amendment) (England) Regulations 2006 (S.I. 2006/69)
- Relevant Authorities (Standards Committee) (Amendment) Regulations 2006 (S.I. 2006/87)
- Local Government (Access to Information) (Variation) Order 2006 (S.I. 2006/88.)
- Merchant Shipping (Training and Certification and Minimum Standards of Safety Communications) (Amendment) Regulations 2006 (S.I. 2006/89)
- Local Safeguarding Children Boards Regulations 2006 (S.I. 2006/90)
- Transport for London (Best Value) (Contracting Out of Investment and Highway Functions) Order 2006 (S.I. 2006/91)
- Cremation (Amendment) Regulations 2006 (S.I. 2006/92)
- Working Time (Amendment) Regulations 2006 (S.I. 2006/99)
- Serious Organised Crime and Police Act 2005 (Delegation under section 43) Order 2006 (S.I. 2006/100)

== 101–200 ==
- Lloyd's Underwriters (Scottish Limited Partnerships) (Tax) (Amendment) Regulations 2006 (S.I. 2006/111)
- Lloyd's Underwriters (Conversion to Limited Liability Underwriting) (Tax) Regulations 2006 (S.I. 2006/112)
- Feeding Stuffs and the Feeding Stuffs (Sampling and Analysis) (Amendment) (England) Regulations 2006 (S.I. 2006/113)
- Feeding Stuffs (Wales) Regulations 2006 (S.I. 2006/116)
- Education (Student Support) Regulations 2006 (S.I. 2006/119)
- Dairy Produce Quotas (Amendment) Regulations 2006 (S.I. 2006/120)
- Police Act 1996 (Local Policing Summaries) Order 2006 (S.I. 2006/122)
- Waste (Household Waste Duty of Care) (Wales) Regulations 2006 (S.I. 2006/123)
- Town and Country Planning (General Permitted Development) (Amendment) (Wales) Order 2006 (S.I. 2006/124)
- Education (School Performance and Unauthorised Absence Targets) (Wales) (Amendment) Regulations 2006 (S.I. 2006/125)
- Assembly Learning Grants and Loans (Higher Education) (Wales) Regulations 2006 (S.I. 2006/126)
- Social Security (Contributions) (Amendment) Regulations 2006 (S.I. 2006/127)
- Education (Admission of Looked After Children) (England) Regulations 2006 (S.I. 2006/128)
- Registered Pension Schemes (Relevant Annuities) Regulations 2006 (S.I. 2006/129)
- Registered Pension Schemes (Uprating Percentages for Defined Benefits Arrangements and Enhanced Protection Limits) Regulations 2006 (S.I. 2006/130)
- Registered Pension Schemes (Enhanced Lifetime Allowance) Regulations 2006 (S.I. 2006/131)
- Armed Forces and Reserve Forces (Compensation Scheme) (Excluded Benefits for Tax Purposes) Regulations 2006 (S.I. 2006/132)
- Registered Pension Schemes (Co-ownership of Living Accommodation) Regulations 2006 (S.I. 2006/133)
- Registered Pension Schemes (Authorised Payments) (Transfers to the Pension Protection Fund) Regulations 2006 (S.I. 2006/134)
- Registered Pension Schemes (Meaning of Pension Commencement Lump Sum) Regulations 2006 (S.I. 2006/135)
- Pension Benefits (Insurance Company Liable as Scheme Administrator) Regulations 2006 (S.I. 2006/136)
- Registered Pension Schemes (Authorised Member Payments) Regulations 2006 (S.I. 2006/137)
- Pension Schemes (Reduction in Pension Rates) Regulations 2006 (S.I. 2006/138)
- Stamp Duty and Stamp Duty Reserve Tax (Extension of Exceptions relating to Recognised Exchanges) Regulations 2006 (S.I. 2006/139)
- Tuberculosis (England) (Amendment) Order 2006 (S.I. 2006/140)
- Education (Supply of Student Support Information to Governing Bodies) Regulations 2006 (S.I. 2006/141)
- Motor Vehicles (EC Type Approval) (Amendment) Regulations 2006 (S.I. 2006/142)
- Duty Stamps (Amendment of paragraph 1(3) of Schedule 2A to the Alcoholic Liquor Duties Act 1979) Order 2006 (S.I. 2006/144)
- Personal Pension Schemes (Appropriate Schemes) (Amendment) Regulations 2006 (S.I. 2006/147)
- Cattle Compensation (England) Order 2006 (S.I. 2006/168)
- Common Agricultural Policy Single Payment and Support Schemes (Reductions from Payments) (England) Regulations 2006 (S.I. 2006/169)
- Boiler (Efficiency) (Amendment) Regulations 2006 (S.I. 2006/170)
- Plant Health (Import Inspection Fees) (Wales) Regulations 2006 (S.I. 2006/171)
- Education Act 2002 (Commencement No. 8) (Wales) Order 2006 (S.I. 2006/172)
- Education Act 2002 (Transitional Provisions and Consequential Amendments) (Wales) Regulations 2006 (S.I. 2006/173)
- Education (Determination of Admission Arrangements) (Wales) Regulations 2006 (S.I. 2006/174)
- New School (Admissions) (Wales) Regulations 2006 (S.I. 2006/175)
- Education (Objections to Admission Arrangements) (Wales) Regulations 2006 (S.I. 2006/176)
- Education (Variation of Admission Arrangements) (Wales) Regulations 2006 (S.I. 2006/177)
- Approval of Codes of Management Practice (Residential Property) (Wales) Order 2006 (S.I. 2006/178)
- Foot-and-Mouth Disease (Wales) Order 2006 (S.I. 2006/179)
- Foot-and-Mouth Disease (Control of Vaccination) (Wales) Regulations 2006 (S.I. 2006/180)
- National Health Service (General Ophthalmic Services Supplementary List) and (General Ophthalmic Services) (Amendment and Consequential Amendment) (Wales) Regulations 2006 (S.I. 2006/181)
- Foot-and-Mouth Disease (England) Order 2006 (S.I. 2006/182)
- Foot-and-Mouth Disease (Control of Vaccination) (England) Regulations 2006 (S.I. 2006/183)
- Taxation of Chargeable Gains (Gilt-edged Securities) Order 2006 (S.I. 2006/184)
- Functions of Primary Care Trusts (Dental Public Health) (England) Regulations 2006 (S.I. 2006/185)
- Child Trust Funds (Amendment) Regulations 2006 (S.I. 2006/199)
- Doncaster and South Humber Healthcare National Health Service Trust (Transfer of Trust Property) Order 2006 (S.I. 2006/200)

== 201–300 ==
- Finance Act 2004 (Duty Stamps) (Appointed Day) Order 2006 (S.I. 2006/201)
- Duty Stamps Regulations 2006 (S.I. 2006/202)
- Child Benefit and Guardian's Allowance (Miscellaneous Amendments) Regulations 2006 (S.I. 2006/203)
- Guardian's Allowance (General) (Amendment) Regulations 2006 (S.I. 2006/204)
- Pension Schemes (Categories of Country and Requirements for Overseas Pension Schemes and Recognised Overseas Pension Schemes) Regulations 2006 (S.I. 2006/206)
- Pensions Schemes (Application of UK Provisions to Relevant Non-UK Schemes) Regulations 2006 (S.I. 2006/207)
- Pension Schemes (Information Requirements — Qualifying Overseas Pension Schemes, Qualifying Recognised Overseas Pensions Schemes and Corresponding Relief) Regulations 2006 (S.I. 2006/208)
- Registered Pension Schemes (Authorised Payments) Regulations 2006 (S.I. 2006/209)
- Employer-Financed Retirement Benefits (Excluded Benefits for Tax Purposes) Regulations 2006 (S.I. 2006/210)
- Registered Pension Schemes (Surrender of Relevant Excess) Regulations 2006 (S.I. 2006/211)
- Pension Schemes (Relevant Migrant Members) Regulations 2006 (S.I. 2006/212)
- Housing Benefit Regulations 2006 S.I. 2006/213)
- Housing Benefit (Persons who have attained the qualifying age for state pension credit) Regulations 2006 S.I. 2006/214)
- Council Tax Benefit Regulations 2006 (S.I. 2006/215)
- Council Tax Benefit (Persons who have attained the qualifying age for state pension credit) Regulations 2006 (S.I. 2006/216)
- Housing Benefit and Council Tax Benefit (Consequential Provisions) Regulations 2006 (S.I. 2006/217)
- Safety of Sports Grounds (Designation) Order 2006 (S.I. 2006/218)
- Disability Discrimination Code of Practice (Public Authorities) (Duty to Promote Equality, Scotland) (Appointed Day) Order 2006 (S.I. 2006/219)
- Town and Country Planning (Use Classes) (Amendment) (England) Order 2006 (S.I. 2006/220)
- Town and Country Planning (General Permitted Development) (Amendment) (England) Order 2006 (S.I. 2006/221)
- Child Tax Credit (Amendment) Regulations 2006 (S.I. 2006/222)
- Child Benefit (General) Regulations 2006 (S.I. 2006/223)
- Sustainable and Secure Buildings Act 2004 (Commencement No. 1) Order 2006 (S.I. 2006/224)
- Hill Farm Allowance Regulations 2006 (S.I. 2006/225)
- Periodic Review of Mineral Planning Permissions (Conygar Quarry) Order 2006 (S.I. 206/226)
- Constitutional Reform Act 2005 (Temporary Modifications) Order 2006 (S.I. 2006/227)
- Constitutional Reform Act 2005 (Commencement No. 4) Order 2006 (S.I. 2006/228)
- Armed Forces Act 2001 (Commencement No. 6) Order 2006 (S.I. 2006/235)
- Non-Domestic Rating and Council Tax (Electronic Communications) (England) Order 2006 (S.I. 2006/237)
- Common Agricultural Policy Single Payment and Support Schemes (Amendment) Regulations 2006 (S.I. 2006/239)
- Gaelic Language (Scotland) Act 2005 (Consequential Modifications) Order 2006 (S.I. 2006/241)
- Charities and Trustee Investment (Scotland) Act 2005 (Consequential Provisions and Modifications) Order 2006 (S.I. 2006/242)
- Income Tax (Pay As You Earn) (Amendment) Regulations 2006 (S.I. 2006/243)
- Community Drivers' Hours and Working Time (Road Tankers) (Temporary Exception) (Amendment) Regulations 2006 (S.I. 2006/244)
- District of Broadland (Whole Council Elections) Order 2006 (S.I. 2006/245)
- Transfer of Undertakings (Protection of Employment) Regulations 2006 (S.I. 2006/246)
- Local Authorities (Alteration of Requisite Calculations) (England) Regulations 2006 (S.I. 2006/247)
- Joint Waste Disposal Authorities (Levies) (England) Regulations 2006 (S.I. 2006/248)
- Local Authorities (Indemnities for Members and Officers) (Wales) Order 2006 (S.I. 2006/249)
- Special Health Authorities (Summarised Accounts) Order 2006 (S.I. 2006/250)
- Community Benefit Societies (Restriction on Use of Assets) Regulations 2006 (S.I. 2006/264)
- Friendly and Industrial and Provident Societies Act 1968 (Audit Exemption) (Amendment) Order 2006 (S.I. 2006/265)
- Railways Act 2005 (Commencement No. 5) Order 2006 (S.I. 2006/266)
- Export Control (Bosnia and Herzegovina) Order 2006 (S.I. 2006/300)

== 301–400 ==
- Common Agricultural Policy Single Payment and Support Schemes (Amendment No. 2) Regulations 2006 (S.I. 2006/301)
- Crime Prevention (Designated Areas) Order 2006 (S.I. 2006/302)
- Naval, Military and Air Forces Etc. (Disablement and Death) Service Pensions (Amendment) Order 2006 (S.I. 2006/303)
- Scotland Act 1998 (Transfer of Functions to the Scottish Ministers etc.) Order 2006 (S.I. 2006/304)
- Health Service Commissioner for England (Special Health Authorities) Order 2006 (S.I. 2006/305)
- Education (Inspectors of Schools in England) Order 2006 (S.I. 2006/306)
- European Communities (Definition of Treaties)(Cooperation Agreement between the European Community and its Member States and the Swiss Confederation to Combat Fraud) Order 2006 (S.I. 2006/307)
- Proceeds of Crime Act 2002 and Money Laundering Regulations 2003 (Amendment) Order 2006 (S.I. 2006/308)
- Commonwealth Countries and Ireland (Immunities and Privileges) (Amendment) Order 2006 (S.I. 2006/309)
- Uzbekistan (Restrictive Measures) (Overseas Territories) Order 2006 (S.I. 2006/310)
- Lebanon and Syria (United Nations Measures) (Overseas Territories) Order 2006 (S.I. 2006/311)
- Disability Discrimination (Northern Ireland) Order 2006 (S.I. 2006/312)
- Safety of Sports Grounds (Northern Ireland) Order 2006 (S.I. 2006/313)
- Industrial and Provident Societies (Northern Ireland) Order 2006 (S.I. 2006/314)
- Patents (Convention Countries) Order 2006 (S.I. 2006/315)
- Copyright and Performances (Application to Other Countries) Order 2006 (S.I. 2006/316)
- Designs (Convention Countries) Order 2006 (S.I. 2006/317)
- Tonnage Tax (Exception of Financial Year 2006) Order 2006 (S.I. 2006/333)
- Industrial Training Levy (Construction Board) Order 2006 (S.I. 2006/334)
- Industrial Training Levy (Engineering Construction Board) Order 2006 (S.I. 2006/335)
- Health and Safety (Fees) Regulations 2006 (S.I. 2006/336)
- Pensions Act 2004 (Funding Defined Benefits) Appointed Day Order 2006 (S.I. 2006/337)
- Wireless Telegraphy (Licence Award) Regulations 2006 (S.I. 2006/338)
- Wireless Telegraphy (Spectrum Trading) (Amendment) Regulations 2006 (S.I. 2006/339)
- Wireless Telegraphy (Register) (Amendment) Regulations 2006 (S.I. 2006/340)
- Wireless Telegraphy (Limitation of Number of Concurrent Spectrum Access Licences) Order 2006 (S.I. 2006/341)
- Bee Diseases and Pests Control (England) Order 2006 (S.I. 2006/342)
- Pensions Act 2004 (PPF Payments and FAS Payments) (Consequential Provisions) Order 2006 (S.I. 2006/343)
- Local Authorities (Alteration of Requisite Calculations) (Wales) Regulations 2006 (S.I. 2006/344)
- Health and Social Care (Community Health and Standards) Act 2003 Commencement (Wales) (No. 4) Order 2006 (S.I. 2006/345)
- Artist's Resale Right Regulations 2006 (S.I. 2006/346)
- Pension Protection Fund (Pension Compensation Cap) Order 2006 (S.I. 2006/347)
- Occupational and Personal Pension Schemes (Consultation by Employers and Miscellaneous Amendment) Regulations 2006 (S.I. 2006/349)
- Greater London Authority (Allocation of Grants for Precept Calculations) Regulations 2006 (S.I. 2006/351)
- Family Proceedings (Amendment) Rules 2006 (S.I. 2006/352)
- Criminal Procedure (Amendment) Rules 2006 (S.I. 2006/353)
- Enterprise Act 2002 (Enforcement Undertakings) Order 2006 (S.I. 2006/354)
- Enterprise Act 2002 (Enforcement Undertakings and Orders) Order 2006 (S.I. 2006/355)
- Offshore Installations (Safety Zones) Order 2006 (S.I. 2006/356)
- Common Agricultural Policy Single Payment and Support Schemes (Wales) (Amendment) Regulations 2006 (S.I. 2006/357)
- National Health Service (Primary Medical Services) (Miscellaneous Amendments) (Wales) Regulations 2006 (S.I. 2006/358)
- National Health Service (Functions of Strategic Health Authorities and Primary Care Trusts and Administration Arrangements) (England) (Amendment) Regulations 2006 (S.I. 2006/359)
- General Medical Services Transitional and Consequential Provisions (Wales) (Amendment) Order 2006 (S.I. 2006/360)
- Public Benefit Corporation (Register of Members) Amendment Regulations 2006 (S.I. 2006/361)
- Public Services Ombudsman (Wales) Act 2005 (Transitional Provisions and Consequential Amendments) Order 2006 (S.I. 2006/362)
- Public Services Ombudsman for Wales (Jurisdiction and Transitional Provisions and Savings) Order 2006 (S.I. 2006/363)
- Registered Pension Schemes (Modification of the Rules of Existing Schemes) Regulations 2006 (S.I. 2006/364)
- Registered Pension Schemes (Unauthorised Payments by Existing Schemes) Regulations 2006 (S.I. 2006/365)
- Birmingham Children's Hospital National Health Service Trust (Establishment) Amendment Order 2006 (S.I. 2006/366)
- Housing (Empty Dwelling Management Orders) (Prescribed Exceptions and Requirements) (England) Order 2006 (S.I. 2006/367)
- Housing (Management Orders and Empty Dwelling Management Orders) (Supplemental Provisions) (England) Regulations 2006 (S.I. 2006/368)
- Housing (Interim Management Orders) (Prescribed Circumstances) (England) Order 2006 (S.I. 2006/369)
- Selective Licensing of Houses (Specified Exemptions) (England) Order 2006 (S.I. 2006/370)
- Licensing of Houses in Multiple Occupation (Prescribed Descriptions) (England) Order 2006 (S.I. 2006/371)
- Management of Houses in Multiple Occupation (England) Regulations 2006 (S.I. 2006/372)
- Licensing and Management of Houses in Multiple Occupation and Other Houses (Miscellaneous Provisions) (England) Regulations 2006 (S.I. 2006/373)
- Serious Organised Crime and Police Act 2005 (Commencement No. 5 and Transitional and Transitory Provisions and Savings) Order 2006 (S.I. 2006/378)
- Criminal Defence Service (Funding) (Amendment) Order 2006 (S.I. 2006/389)
- Local Elections (Principal Areas and Parishes and Communities) (Amendment) (England and Wales) Rules 2006 (S.I. 2006/390)
- Judicial Pensions and Retirement Act 1993 (Addition of Qualifying Judicial Offices) Order 2006 (S.I. 2006/391)
- Private Security Industry Act 2001 (Commencement No. 10) Order 2006 (S.I. 2006/392)
- Anti-social Behaviour Act 2003 (Commencement No. 6) (England) Order 2006 (S.I. 2006/393)
- Tuberculosis (England) Order 2006 (S.I. 2006/394)
- Medicines (Traditional Herbal Medicinal Products for Human Use) (Consequential Amendment) Regulations 2006 (S.I. 2006/395)
- National Endowment for Science, Technology and the Arts (Increase of Endowment) Order 2006 (S.I. 2006/396)
- Railways (Interoperability) Regulations 2006 (S.I. 2006/397)
- Manchester City Council (Mancunian Way) Special Road Scheme 1968 Variation Scheme 2005 Confirmation Instrument 2006 (S.I. 2006/398)
- Greater Manchester County Council (Carrington, Spur, Trafford) (Special Roads) Scheme 1984 Revocation Scheme 2005 Confirmation Instrument 2006 (S.I. 2006/399)
- Immigration Services Commissioner (Designated Professional Body) (Fees) Order 2006 (S.I. 2006/400)

== 401–500 ==
- Road Traffic (NHS Charges) Amendment Regulations 2006 (S.I. 2006/401)
- Human Tissue Act 2004 (Commencement No. 4 and Transitional Provisions) Order 2006 (S.I. 2006/404)
- Greater Manchester (Light Rapid Transit System) Order 2006 (S.I. 2006/405)
- Education (Designated Institutions in Further Education) (Amendment) Order 2006 (S.I. 2006/408)
- Workers' Educational Association (Designated Institution in Further Education) Order 2006 (S.I. 2006/409)
- Private Security Industry Act 2001 (Approved Contractor Scheme) Regulations 2006 (S.I. 2006/425)
- Private Security Industry Act 2001 (Designated Activities) Order 2006 (S.I. 2006/426)
- Private Security Industry Act 2001 (Duration of Licence) Order 2006 (S.I. 2006/427)
- Private Security Industry Act 2001 (Exemption) (Aviation Security) Regulations 2006 (S.I. 2006/428)
- Consistent Financial Reporting (England) (Amendment) Regulations 2006 (S.I. 2006/437)
- Management of Health and Safety at Work (Amendment) Regulations 2006 (S.I. 2006/438)
- Occupational Pension Schemes (Republic of Ireland Schemes Exemption (Revocation) and Tax Exempt Schemes (Miscellaneous Amendments)) Regulations 2006 (S.I. 2006/467)
- School Finance (England) Regulations 2006 (S.I. 2006/468)
- National Health Service (Optical Charges and Payments) Amendment Regulations 2006 (S.I. 2006/479)
- Northern Ireland Arms Decommissioning Act 1997 (Amnesty Period) Order 2006 (S.I. 2006/480)
- Health and Social Care Act 2001 (Commencement No. 14) (England) Order 2006 (S.I. 2006/481)
- Student Fees (Qualifying Courses and Persons) Regulations 2006 (S.I. 2006/482)
- Education (Fees and Awards) (Amendment) Regulations 2006 (S.I. 2006/483)
- Regulatory Reform (Fire Safety) Subordinate Provisions Order 2006 (S.I. 2006/484)
- Contaminants in Food (Wales) Regulations 2006 (S.I. 2006/485)
- Commission for Patient and Public Involvement in Health (Membership and Procedure) (Amendment) Regulations 2006 (S.I. 2006/486)
- Functions of Local Health Boards (Dental Public Health) (Wales) Regulations 2006 (S.I. 2006/487)
- General Dental Services and Personal Dental Services Transitional Provisions (Wales) Order 2006 (S.I. 2006/488)
- National Health Service (Personal Dental Services Agreements) (Wales) Regulations 2006 (S.I. 2006/489)
- National Health Service (General Dental Services Contracts) (Wales) Regulations 2006 (S.I. 2006/490)
- National Health Service (Dental Charges) (Wales) Regulations 2006 (S.I. 2006/491)
- Council Tax and Non-Domestic Rating (Demand Notices) (Amendment) (England) Regulations 2006 (S.I. 2006/492)
- Immigration (Passenger Transit Visa) (Amendment) Order 2006 (S.I. 2006/493)
- Medicines for Human Use and Medical Devices (Fees Amendments) Regulations 2006 (S.I. 2006/494)
- Central Rating List (Amendment) (England) Regulations 2006 (S.I. 2006/495)
- Social Security Revaluation of Earnings Factors Order 2006 (S.I. 2006/496)
- Taxation of Judicial Pensions (Consequential Provisions) Order 2006 (S.I. 2006/497)
- Registered Pension Schemes (Block Transfers) (Permitted Membership Period) Regulations 2006 (S.I. 2006/498)
- Registered Pension Schemes (Transfer of Sums and Assets) Regulations 2006 (S.I. 2006/499)
- Social Security Pensions (Low Earnings Threshold) Order 2006 (S.I. 2006/500)

== 501–600 ==
- Fines Collection Regulations 2006 (S.I. 2006/501)
- Collection of Fines (Pilot Scheme) and Discharge of Fines by Unpaid Work (Pilot Schemes) (Amendment) Order 2006 (S.I. 2006/502)
- Isle of Wight (Parishes) Order 2006 (S.I. 2006/503)
- Kettering (Parishes) Order 2006 (S.I. 2006/504)
- Bradford (Parishes) Order 2006 (S.I. 2006/505)
- Fish Labelling (Amendment) (England) Regulations 2006 (S.I. 2006/506)
- Student Fees (Inflation Index) Regulations 2006 (S.I. 2006/507)
- Education (Budget Statements) (England) Regulations 2006 (S.I. 2006/511)
- Prevention of Terrorism Act 2005 (Continuance in force of sections 1 to 9) Order 2006 (S.I. 2006/512)
- Information and Consultation of Employees (Amendment) Regulations 2006 (S.I. 2006/514)
- Postgraduate Medical Education and Training Board (Fees) Rules Order 2006 (S.I. 2006/515)
- Social Security (Deferral of Retirement Pensions etc.) Regulations 2006 (S.I. 2006/516)
- Commission for Social Care Inspection (Fees and Frequency of Inspections) (Amendment) Regulations 2006 (S.I. 2006/517)
- Hill Farm Allowance (Amendment) Regulations 2006 (S.I. 2006/518)
- Seed Potatoes (Fees) (Wales) Regulations 2006 (S.I. 2006/519)
- Transition from Primary to Secondary School (Wales) Regulations 2006 (S.I. 2006/520)
- Local Authorities (Capital Finance and Accounting) (Amendment) (England) Regulations 2006 (S.I. 2006/521)
- Enterprise Act 2002 (Water Services Regulation Authority) Order 2006 (S.I. 2006/522)
- Unfair Terms in Consumer Contracts (Amendment) and Water Act 2003 (Transitional Provision) Regulations 2006 (S.I. 2006/523)
- Motor Vehicles (Driving Licences) (Amendment) Regulations 2006 (S.I. 2006/524)
- Motor Cars (Driving Instruction) (Amendment) Regulations 2006 (S.I. 2006/525)
- Stratford-on-Avon (Parishes) Order 2006 (S.I. 2006/526)
- Social Security (Incapacity Benefit Work-focused Interviews) Amendment Regulations 2006 (S.I. 2006/536)
- Highways Act 1980 (Gating Orders) (England) Regulations 2006 (S.I. 2006/537)
- Human Tissue Act 2004 (Powers of Entry and Search: Supply of Information) Regulations 2006 (S.I. 2006/538)
- Private and Voluntary Health Care (England) (Amendment) Regulations 2006 (S.I. 2006/539)
- NCIS and NCS (Abolition) Order 2006 (S.I. 2006/540)
- Gaming Act 1968 (Variation of Fees) Order 2006 (S.I. 2006/541)
- Lotteries (Gambling Commission Fees) Order 2006 (S.I. 2006/542)
- Gaming Act 1968 (Variation of Fees) (England and Wales) Order 2006 (S.I. 2006/543)
- Gloucestershire (Coroners' Districts) Order 2006 (S.I. 2006/544)
- Social Security (Claims and Payments) Amendment Regulations 2006 (S.I. 2006/551)
- National Health Service (Local Pharmaceutical Services etc.) Regulations 2006 (S.I. 2006/552)
- Local Government (Best Value) Performance Indicators and Performance Standards (Amendment) (England) Order 2006 (S.I. 2006/553)
- Port of Ipswich Harbour Revision Order 2006 (S.I. 2006/554)
- Isle College (Dissolution) Order 2006 (S.I. 2006/555)
- Railways Act 2005 (Amendment) Regulations 2006 (S.I. 2006/556)
- Health and Safety (Enforcing Authority for Railways and Other Guided Transport Systems) Regulations 2006 (S.I. 2006/557)
- Occupational Pension Schemes (Fraud Compensation Levy) Regulations 2006 (S.I. 2006/558)
- Income-related Benefits (Subsidy to Authorities) Amendment (No. 2) Order 2006 (S.I. 2006/559)
- Pensions Act 2004 (Commencement No. 9) Order 2006 (S.I. 2006/560)
- Insolvency Proceedings (Fees) (Amendment) Order 2006 (S.I. 2006/561)
- General Dental Services, Personal Dental Services and Abolition of the Dental Practice Board Transitional and Consequential Provisions Order 2006 (S.I. 2006/562)
- National Health Service (General Dental Services Contracts and Personal Dental Services Agreements) Amendment Regulations 2006 (S.I. 2006/563)
- Accounts and Audit (Amendment)(England) Regulations 2006 (S.I. 2006/564)
- Awards for All (England) Joint Scheme (Authorisation) Order 2006 (S.I. 2006/565)
- Occupational Pension Schemes (Pension Protection Levies) (Transitional Period and Modification for Multi-employer Schemes) Regulations 2006 (S.I. 2006/566)
- Registered Pension Schemes (Provision of Information) Regulations 2006 (S.I. 2006/567)
- Registered Pension Schemes (Prescribed Manner of Determining Amount of Annuities) Regulations 2006 (S.I. 2006/568)
- Registered Pension Schemes (Splitting of Schemes) Regulations 2006 (S.I. 2006/569)
- Registered Pension Schemes and Overseas Pension Schemes (Electronic Communication of Returns and Information) Regulations 2006 570)
- Registered Pension Schemes (Authorised Member Payments) (No. 2) Regulations 2006 (S.I. 2006/571)
- Taxation of Pension Schemes (Transitional Provisions) Order 2006 (S.I. 2006/572)
- Pension Schemes (Transfers, Reorganisations and Winding Up) (Transitional Provisions) Order 2006 (S.I. 2006/573)
- Registered Pension Schemes (Authorised Surplus Payments) Regulations 2006 (S.I. 2006/574)
- Pension Protection Fund (Tax) Regulations 2006 (S.I. 2006/575)
- Social Security (Contributions) (Amendment No. 2) Regulations 2006 (S.I. 2006/576)
- Warehousekeepers and Owners of Warehoused Goods (Amendment) Regulations 2006 (S.I. 2006/577)
- National Care Standards Commission (Commission for Social Care Inspection) (Fees) (Adoption Agencies, Adoption Support Agencies and Local Authority Fostering Functions) (Amendment) Regulations 2006 (S.I. 2006/578)
- A404 Trunk Road (Maidenhead Thicket to Handy Cross) (Closure of Layby) Order 2006 (S.I. 2006/579)
- Pension Protection Fund (General and Miscellaneous Amendments) Regulations 2006 (S.I. 2006/580)
- Tyne and Wear Passenger Transport Authority (Increase in Number of Members) Order 2006 (S.I. 2006/582)
- Social Housing (Grants to Bodies other than Registered Social Landlords) (Additional Purposes) (England) Order 2006 (S.I. 2006/583)
- Private Hire Vehicles (London) (Transitional and Saving Provisions) (Amendment) Regulations 2006 (S.I. 2006/584)
- Dartford – Thurrock Crossing (Amendment) Regulations 2006 (S.I. 2006/585)
- Social Security (Industrial Injuries) (Prescribed Diseases) Amendment Regulations 2006 (S.I. 2006/586)
- Value Added Tax (Amendment) Regulations 2006 (S.I. 2006/587)
- Social Security (Miscellaneous Amendments) Regulations 2006 (S.I. 2006/588)
- Healthy Start Scheme and Welfare Food (Amendment) Regulations 2006 (S.I. 2006/589)
- Official Feed and Food Controls (Wales) Regulations 2006 (S.I. 2006/590)
- Licensing Act 2003 (Consequential Amendment)(Non-Domestic Rating)(Public Houses in England) Order 2006 (S.I. 2006/591)
- Road Traffic (Permitted Parking Area and Special Parking Area) (Borough of Bracknell Forest) Order 2006 (S.I. 2006/592)
- Bus Lane Contraventions (Approved Local Authorities) (England) (Amendment) Order 2006 (S.I. 2006/593)
- Serious Organised Crime and Police Act 2005 (Consequential and Supplementary Amendments to Secondary Legislation) Order 2006 (S.I. 2006/594)
- Pension Protection Fund (Provision of Information) (Amendment) Regulations 2006 (S.I. 2006/595)
- Functions of Primary Care Trusts and Strategic Health Authorities and the NHS Business Services Authority (Awdurdod Gwasanaethau Busnes y GIG) (Primary Dental Services) (England) Regulations 2006 (S.I. 2006/596)
- Pension Protection Fund (Valuation of the Assets and Liabilities of the Pension Protection Fund) Regulations 2006 (S.I. 2006/597)
- Railways (Access to Training Services) Regulations 2006 (S.I. 2006/598)
- Railways and Other Guided Transport Systems (Safety) Regulations 2006 (S.I. 2006/599)
- National Health Service (Pension Scheme, Injury Benefits and Additional Voluntary Contributions) Amendment Regulations 2006 (S.I. 2006/600)

== 601–700 ==
- Air Navigation (General) Regulations 2006 (S.I. 2006/601)
- Elections (Policy Development Grants Scheme) Order 2006 (S.I. 2006/602)
- Measuring Instruments (EEC Requirements) (Fees) (Amendment) Regulations 2006 (S.I. 2006/604)
- Competition Act 1998 (Public Policy Exclusion) Order 2006 (S.I. 2006/605)
- Naval, Military and Air Forces Etc. (Disablement and Death) Service Pensions Order 2006 (S.I. 2006/606)
- Transfer of Functions (Office of Her Majesty's Paymaster General) Order 2006 (S.I. 2006/607)
- European Communities (Designation) Order 2006 (S.I. 2006/608)
- Scotland Act 1998 (Modifications of Schedule 5) Order 2006 (S.I. 2006/609)
- Ivory Coast (Restrictive Measures) (Overseas Territories) (Amendment) Order 2006 (S.I. 2006/610)
- Rates (Capital Values, etc.) (Northern Ireland) Order 2006 (S.I. 2006/611)
- Stormont Estate (Northern Ireland) Order 2006 (S.I. 2006/612)
- Budget (Northern Ireland) Order 2006 (S.I. 2006/613)
- Registered Pension Schemes (Authorised Payments — Arrears of Pension) Regulations 2006 (S.I. 2006/614)
- Local Government (Improvement Plans) (Wales) Order 2006 (S.I. 2006/615)
- West Northamptonshire Development Corporation (Planning Functions) Order 2006 (S.I. 2006/616)
- Feeding Stuffs and the Feeding Stuffs (Sampling and Analysis) (Amendment) (Wales) Regulations 2006 (S.I. 2006/617)
- Environmental Impact Assessment (Land Drainage Improvement Works) (Amendment) Regulations 2006 (S.I. 2006/618)
- Communications (Television Licensing) (Amendment) Regulations 2006 (S.I. 2006/619)
- Police Authorities (Best Value) Performance Indicators (Amendment) Order 2006 (S.I. 2006/620)
- Government of Further Education Corporations (Revocation) (Wales) Regulations 2006 (S.I. 2006/621)
- Insolvent Partnerships (Amendment) Order 2006 (S.I. 2006/622)
- Driving Standards Agency Trading Fund (Maximum Borrowing) Order 2006 (S.I. 2006/623)
- Social Security (Contributions) (Re-rating and National Insurance Funds Payments) Order 2006 (S.I. 2006/624)
- Building and Approved Inspectors (Amendment) Regulations 2006 (S.I. 2006/625)
- Domestic Violence, Crime and Victims Act 2004 (Victims' Code of Practice) Order 2006 (S.I. 2006/629)
- Race Relations Code of Practice relating to Employment (Appointed Day) Order 2006 (S.I. 2006/630)
- Gambling Act 2005 (Commencement No. 3) Order 2006 (S.I. 2006/631)
- NHS Business Services Authority (Awdurdod Gwasanaethau Busnes y GIG) (Establishment and Constitution) (Amendment) Order 2006 (S.I. 2006/632)
- NHS Business Services Authority (Awdurdod Gwasanaethau Busnes y GIG) (Amendment) Regulations 2006 (S.I. 2006/633)
- NHS Pensions Agency (Asiantaeth Pensiynau'r GIG) Abolition Order 2006 (S.I. 2006/634)
- Special Health Authorities Abolition Order 2006 (S.I. 2006/635)
- Gambling Act 2005 (Licensing Authority Policy Statement)(England and Wales) Regulations 2006 (S.I. 2006/636)
- Gambling Act 2005 (Licensing Authority Policy Statement) (First Appointed Day) Order 2006 (S.I. 2006/637)
- Pneumoconiosis, Byssinosis and Miscellaneous Diseases Benefit (Amendment) Scheme 2006 (S.I. 2006/638)
- Civil Partnership Act 2004 (Commencement No. 3) Order 2006 (S.I. 2006/639)
- NHS Blood and Transplant (Gwaed a Thrawsblaniadau'r GIG) (Amendment) Regulations 2006 (S.I. 2006/640)
- Water Resources (Abstraction and Impounding) Regulations 2006 (S.I. 2006/641)
- Films (Certification) (Amendment) Regulations 2006 (S.I. 2006/642)
- Films (Definition of "British Film") Order 2006 (S.I. 2006/643)
- Housing Benefit (Amendment) Regulations 2006 (S.I. 2006/644)
- Social Security Benefits Up-rating Order 2006 (S.I. 2006/645)
- Housing (Approval of Codes of Management Practice) (Student Accommodation) (England) Order 2006 (S.I. 2006/646)
- Houses in Multiple Occupation (Specified Educational Establishments) (England) Regulations 2006 (S.I. 2006/647)
- Plant Breeders' Rights (Naming and Fees) Regulations 2006 (S.I. 2006/648)
- Merchant Shipping (Light Dues) (Amendment) Regulations 2006 (S.I. 2006/649)
- Homelessness (Suitability of Accommodation) (Wales) Order 2006 (S.I. 2006/650)
- Joint Waste Disposal Authorities (Recycling Payments) (Disapplication) (England) Order 2006 (S.I. 2006/651)
- The Building and Approved Inspectors (Amendment) Regulations 2006 (S.I. 2006/652)
- Court of Protection (Amendment) Rules 2006 (S.I. 2006/653)
- National Lottery etc. Act 1993 (Amendment of Section 23) Order 2006 (S.I. 2006/654)
- Olympic Lotteries (Payments out of Fund) Regulations 2006 655)
- Clean Neighbourhoods and Environment Act 2005 (Commencement No. 4) Order 2006 (S.I. 2006/656)
- Nuclear Reactors (Environmental Impact Assessment for Decommissioning) (Amendment) Regulations 2006 (S.I. 2006/657)
- Gangmasters Licensing (Exclusions) Regulations 2006 (S.I. 2006/658)
- Weights and Measures (Packaged Goods) Regulations 2006 (S.I. 2006/659)
- Gangmasters (Licensing Conditions) Rules 2006 (S.I. 2006/660)
- Water Environment (Controlled Activities) (Scotland) Regulations 2005 (Notices in the Interests of National Security) Order 2006 (S.I. 2006/661)
- Gangmasters (Appeals) Regulations 2006 (S.I. 2006/662)
- Social Security (Industrial Injuries) (Dependency) (Permitted Earnings Limits) Order 2006 (S.I. 2006/663)
- Pension Protection Fund (Risk-based Pension Protection Levy) Regulations 2006 (S.I. 2006/672)
- Guaranteed Minimum Pensions Increase Order 2006 673Occupational Pension Schemes (Trustees' Knowledge and Understanding) Regulations 2006 (S.I. 2006/673)
- National Assistance (Sums for Personal Requirements and Assessment of Resources) (Amendment) (England) Regulations 2006 (S.I. 2006/674)
- National Health Service (Charges for Drugs and Appliances) and (Travel Expenses and Remission of Charges) Amendment Regulations 2006 (S.I. 2006/675)
- Judicial Discipline (Prescribed Procedures) Regulations 2006 (S.I. 2006/676)
- Discipline of Coroners (Designation) Order 2006 (S.I. 2006/677)
- Judicial Appointments and Discipline (Modification of Offices) Order 2006 (S.I. 2006/678)
- Permitted Persons (Designation) Order 2006 (S.I. 2006/679)
- Lord Chancellor (Transfer of Functions and Supplementary Provisions) Order 2006 (S.I. 2006/680)
- Pension Protection Fund (Reviewable Matters and Review and Reconsideration of Reviewable Matters) (Amendment) Regulations 2006 (S.I. 2006/685)
- Occupational Pension Schemes (Trustees' Knowledge and Understanding) Regulations 2006 (S.I. 2006/686)
- Social Security (Provisions relating to Qualifying Young Persons) (Amendment) Regulations 2006 (S.I. 2006/692)

== 701–800 ==
- Social Security Benefits Up-rating Regulations 2006 (S.I. 2006/712)
- Community Legal Service (Financial) (Amendment) Regulations 2006 (S.I. 2006/713)
- Occupational Pension Schemes (Member-nominated Trustees and Directors) Regulations 2006 (S.I. 2006/714)
- Magistrates' Courts Fees (Amendment) Order 2006 (S.I. 2006/715)
- Gateshead (Parish) Order 2006 (S.I. 2006/716)
- Armed Forces Pension Scheme etc. (Amendment) Order 2006 (S.I. 2006/717)
- Social Security (Young Persons) Amendment Regulations 2006 (S.I. 2006/718)
- Civil Proceedings Fees (Amendment) Order 2006 (S.I. 2006/719)
- Asylum Support (Amendment) Regulations 2006 (S.I. 2006/733)
- Insolvency (Scotland) Amendment Rules 2006 (S.I. 2006/734)
- Insolvency (Scotland) Amendment Order 2006 (S.I. 2006/735)
- Teachers' Pensions (Miscellaneous Amendments) Regulations 2006 (S.I. 2006/736)
- Greenhouse Gas Emissions Trading Scheme (Amendment) Regulations 2006 (S.I. 2006/737)
- Workmen's Compensation (Supplementation) (Amendment) Scheme 2006 (S.I. 2006/738)
- Family Proceedings Fees (Amendment) Order 2006 (S.I. 2006/739)
- Police Pensions (Amendment) Regulations 2006 (S.I. 2006/740)
- Pensions Increase (Review) Order 2006 (S.I. 2006/741)
- Occupational Pension Schemes (Levy Ceiling) Order 2006 (S.I. 2006/742)
- Environmental Protection (Waste Recycling Payments) Regulations 2006 (S.I. 2006/743)
- Taxation of Pension Schemes (Consequential Amendments of Occupational and Personal Pension Schemes Legislation) Order 2006 (S.I. 2006/744)
- Taxation of Pension Schemes (Consequential Amendments) Order 2006 (S.I. 2006/745)
- Stamp Duty and Stamp Duty Reserve Tax (Definition of Unit Trust Scheme and Open-ended Investment Company) (Amendment) Regulations 2006 (S.I. 2006/746)
- Judicial Pensions (Additional Voluntary Contributions) (Amendment) Regulations 2006 (S.I. 2006/747)
- Police Act 1997 (Criminal Records) (Amendment) Regulations 2006 (S.I. 2006/748)
- Judicial Pensions (Contributions) (Amendment) Regulations 2006 (S.I. 2006/749)
- Police Act 1997 (Criminal Records) (Registration) Regulations 2006 (S.I. 2006/750)
- Criminal Justice Act 2003 (Commencement No. 12) Order 2006 (S.I. 2006/751)
- Representation of the People (England and Wales) (Amendment) Regulations 2006 (S.I. 2006/752)
- Animals and Animal Products (Examination for Residues and Maximum Residue Limits) (Amendment) Regulations 2006 (S.I. 2006/755)
- Charges for Inspections and Controls (Amendment) Regulations 2006 (S.I. 2006/756)
- Social Security (Incapacity for Work) Amendment Regulations 2006 (S.I. 2006/757)
- Gender Recognition (Application Fees) Order 2006 (S.I. 2006/758)
- Occupational Pension Schemes (Modification of Schemes) Regulations 2006 (S.I. 2006/759)
- Patents, Trade Marks and Designs (Address For Service and Time Limits, etc.) Rules 2006 (S.I. 2006/760)
- Football Spectators (Prescription) (Amendment) Order 2006 (S.I. 2006/761)
- Dairy Produce Quotas (Wales) (Amendment) Regulations 2006 (S.I. 2006/762)
- Trade Marks (International Registration) (Amendment) Order 2006 (S.I. 2006/763)
- Revenue Support Grant (Specified Bodies) (Wales) (Amendment) Regulations 2006 (S.I. 2006/764)
- Personal Injuries (Civilians) (Amendment) Scheme 2006 (S.I. 2006/765)
- Tax Credits (Miscellaneous Amendments) Regulations 2006 (S.I. 2006/766)
- Products of Animal Origin (Third Country Imports) (Wales) (Amendment) Regulations 2006 (S.I. 2006/767)
- Clean Neighbourhoods and Environment Act 2005 (Commencement No. 1 and Savings) (Wales) Order 2006 (S.I. 2006/768)
- Social Security (Industrial Injuries) (Prescribed Diseases) Amendment (No. 2) Regulations 2006 (S.I. 2006/769)
- Statutory Nuisances (Insects) Regulations 2006 (S.I. 2006/770)
- Statutory Nuisance (Appeals) (Amendment) (England) Regulations 2006 (S.I. 2006/771)
- Energy Administration (Scotland) Rules 2006 (S.I. 2006/772)
- Broads (2006) Internal Drainage Board Order 2006 (S.I. 2006/773)
- Witham Third District Internal Drainage District (Alteration of Boundaries) Order 2006 (S.I. 2006/774)
- Surrey and Borders Partnership National Health Service Trust (Originating Capital) Order 2006 (S.I. 2006/775)
- Stamp Duty Land Tax (Administration) (Amendment) Regulations 2006 (S.I. 2006/776)
- Income Tax (Pay As You Earn, etc.), (Amendment) Regulations 2006 (S.I. 2006/777)
- Occupational and Personal Pension Schemes (Miscellaneous Amendments) Regulations 2006 (S.I. 2006/778)
- Controls on Dogs (Non-application to Designated Land) Order 2006 (S.I. 2006/779)
- Regulatory Reform (Forestry) Order 2006 (S.I. 2006/780)
- Statutory Nuisances (Artificial Lighting) (Designation of Relevant Sports) (England) Order 2006 (S.I. 2006/781)
- Nottingham University Hospitals National Health Service Trust (Establishment) and the Nottingham City Hospital National Health Service Trust and the Queen's Medical Centre, Nottingham, University Hospital National Health Service Trust (Dissolution) Order 2006 (S.I. 2006/782)
- Environmental Offences (Fixed Penalties) (Miscellaneous Provisions) Regulations 2006 (S.I. 2006/783)
- Petroleum Licensing (Exploration and Production) (Seaward and Landward Areas) (Amendment) Regulations 2006 (S.I. 2006/784)
- Buckinghamshire Mental Health National Health Service Trust (Dissolution) Order 2006 (S.I. 2006/785)
- Sussex Partnership National Health Service Trust (Establishment) and the East Sussex County Healthcare National Health Service Trust and the West Sussex Health and Social Care National Health Service Trust (Dissolution) Order 2006 (S.I. 2006/786)
- Oxfordshire Mental Healthcare National Health Service Trust (Change of Name) (Establishment) Amendment Order 2006 (S.I. 2006/787)
- Great Western Ambulance Service National Health Service Trust (Establishment) and the Avon Ambulance Service National Health Service Trust, the Gloucestershire Ambulance Service National Health Service Trust and the Wiltshire Ambulance Service National Health Service Trust (Dissolution) Order 2006 (S.I. 2006/788)
- Clean Neighbourhoods and Environment Act 2005 (Commencement No. 1, Transitional and Savings Provisions) (England) Order 2006 (S.I. 2006/795)
- Dog Control Orders (Procedures) Regulations 2006 (S.I. 2006/798)
- Statutory Sick Pay (General) Amendment Regulations 2006 (S.I. 2006/799)

== 801–900 ==
- Pensions Increase (Armed Forces Pension Schemes and Conservation Board) Regulations 2006 (S.I. 2006/801)
- Occupational Pension Schemes (Payments to Employer) Regulations 2006 (S.I. 2006/802)
- Severn-Trent Regional Flood Defence Committee Order 2006 (S.I. 2006/803)
- North West Regional Flood Defence Committee Order 2006 (S.I. 2006/804)
- Private Security Industry Act 2001 (Designated Activities) (Amendment) Order 2006 (S.I. 2006/824)
- Kent and Medway National Health Service and Social Care Partnership Trust (Establishment) and the West Kent National Health Service and Social Care Trust and the East Kent National Health Service and Social Care Partnership Trust (Dissolution) Order 2006 (S.I. 2006/825)
- General Drainage Charges (Anglian Region) Order 2006 (S.I. 2006/826)
- Tees, Esk and Wear Valleys National Health Service Trust (Establishment) and the County Durham and Darlington Priority Services National Health Service Trust and the Tees and North East Yorkshire National Health Service Trust (Dissolution) Order 2006 (S.I. 2006/827)
- Northumberland, Tyne and Wear National Health Service Trust (Establishment) and the South of Tyne and Wearside Mental Health National Health Service Trust, the Northgate and Prudhoe National Health Service Trust and the Newcastle, North Tyneside and Northumberland Mental Health National Health Service Trust (Dissolution) Order 2006 (S.I. 2006/828)
- Pneumoconiosis etc. (Workers' Compensation) (Payment of Claims) (Amendment) Regulations 2006 (S.I. 2006/829)
- Residential Property Tribunal (Fees) (England) Regulations 2006 (S.I. 2006/830)
- Residential Property Tribunal Procedure (England) Regulations 2006 (S.I. 2006/831)
- Social Security (Miscellaneous Amendments) (No. 2) Regulations 2006 (S.I. 2006/832)
- Representation of the People (Scotland) (Amendment) Regulations 2006 (S.I. 2006/834)
- Anti-social Behaviour Act 2003 (Commencement No. 4) (Amendment) Order 2006 (S.I. 2006/835)
- Health and Social Care (Community Health and Standards) Act 2003 Commencement (No. 3 and No. 8) (Amendment) Order 2006 (S.I. 2006/836)
- Children (Prescribed Orders – Northern Ireland, Guernsey and Isle of Man) Amendment Regulations 2006 (S.I. 2006/837)
- Archbishop Courtenay Primary School (Designation as having a Religious Character) Order 2006 (S.I. 2006/838)
- Westminster Church of England Primary School (Designation as having a Religious Character) Order 2006 (S.I. 2006/839)
- Unity College (Designation as having a Religious Character) Order 2006 (S.I. 2006/840)
- Trinity CoE VC Primary School (Designation as having a Religious Character) Order 2006 (S.I. 2006/841)
- Planning and Compulsory Purchase Act 2004 (Commencement No. 4 and Consequential, Transitional and Savings Provisions) (Wales) (Amendment) Order 2006 (S.I. 2006/842)
- Loan Relationships and Derivative Contracts (Disregard and Bringing into Account of Profits and Losses) Regulations 2006 (S.I. 2006/843)
- Products of Animal Origin (Third Country Imports) (England) (No. 4) (Amendment) Regulations 2006 (S.I. 2006/844)
- Road Traffic (Permitted Parking Area and Special Parking Area) (County of Surrey) (Borough of Surrey Heath) Order 2006 (S.I. 2006/851)
- Salmonella in Broiler Flocks (Survey Powers) (England) Regulations 2006 (S.I. 2006/864)
- Landfill Tax (Amendment) Regulations 2006 (S.I. 2006/865)
- Brucellosis (Wales) Order 2006 (S.I. 2006/866)
- Enzootic Bovine Leukosis (Wales) Order 2006 (S.I. 2006/867)
- Value Added Tax (Consideration for Fuel Provided for Private Use) Order 2006 (S.I. 2006/868)
- Value Added Tax (Special Provisions) (Amendment) (No.2) Order 2006 (S.I. 2006/869)
- Children Act 2004 (Commencement No. 7) (Wales) Order 2006 (S.I. 2006/870)
- Capital Gains Tax (Annual Exempt Amount) Order 2006 (S.I. 2006/871)
- Income Tax (Indexation) Order 2006 (S.I. 2006/872)
- Staffing of Maintained Schools (Wales) Regulations 2006 (S.I. 2006/873)
- Value Added Tax (Cars) (Amendment) Order 2006 (S.I. 2006/874)
- Stamp Duty Land Tax (Amendment to the Finance Act 2003) Regulations 2006 (S.I. 2006/875)
- Value Added Tax (Increase of Registration Limits) Order 2006 (S.I. 2006/876)
- Single Education Plan (Wales) Regulations 2006 (S.I. 2006/877)
- Care Standards Act 2000 and the Children Act 1989 (Abolition of Fees) (Wales) Regulations 2006 (S.I. 2006/878)
- Education Act 2002 (Commencement No. 9 and Transitional Provisions) (Wales) Order 2006 (S.I. 2006/879)
- Lands Tribunal (Amendment) Rules 2006 (S.I. 2006/880)
- Income Tax (Exempt Amounts for Childcare Vouchers and for Employer Contracted Childcare) Order 2006 (S.I. 2006/882)
- Social Security (Contributions) (Amendment No. 3) Regulations 2006 (S.I. 2006/883)
- National Assembly for Wales (Representation of the People) (Amendment) Order 2006 (S.I. 2006/884)
- Children Act 2004 (Commencement No. 6) (Wales) Order 2006 (S.I. 2006/885)
- Local Authorities (Functions and Responsibilities) (Amendment) (England) Regulations 2006 (S.I. 2006/886)
- Disability Discrimination (Premises) Regulations 2006 (S.I. 2006/887)

== 901–1000 ==
- Social Security (Working Neighbourhoods) Miscellaneous Amendments Regulations 2006 (S.I. 2006/909)
- Energy-Saving Items Regulations 2006 (S.I. 2006/912)
- National Health Service (Miscellaneous Amendments Relating to Independent Prescribing) Regulations 2006 (S.I. 2006/913)
- Medicines (Sale or Supply) (Miscellaneous Amendments) Regulations 2006 (S.I. 2006/914)
- Medicines for Human Use (Prescribing) (Miscellaneous Amendments) Order 2006 (S.I. 2006/915)
- European Parliamentary (United Kingdom Representatives) Pensions (Amendment) Order 2006 (S.I. 2006/919)
- Parliamentary Pensions (Amendment) Regulations 2006 (S.I. 2006/920)
- Charities (Cheadle Royal Hospital, Manchester) Order 2006 (S.I. 2006/921)
- A5092 Trunk Road (Between A595 and A590) (Detrunking) Order 2006 (S.I. 2006/922)
- A595 Trunk Road (Calder Bridge to A5092 at Grizebeck) (Detrunking) Order 2006 (S.I. 2006/923)
- Occupational Pension Schemes (Cross-border Activities) (Amendment) Regulations 2006 (S.I. 2006/925)
- Children Act 2004 (Commencement No. 8) Order 2006 (S.I. 2006/927)
- Civil Partnership Act 2004 (Commencement No. 4) (Northern Ireland) Order 2006 (S.I. 2006/928)
- Education (Student Loans) (Amendment) (England and Wales) Regulations 2006 (S.I. 2006/929)
- Education (Mandatory Awards) (Amendment) Regulations 2006 (S.I. 2006/930)
- Planning and Compulsory Purchase Act 2004 (Commencement No. 7) Order 2006 (S.I. 2006/931)
- Police (Injury Benefit) Regulations 2006 (S.I. 2006/932)
- Rail Vehicle Accessibility (Gatwick Express Class 458 Vehicles) Exemption Order 2006 (S.I. 2006/933)
- Environment Act 1995 (Commencement No. 23) (England and Wales) Order 2006 (S.I. 2006/934)
- Occupational Pension Schemes (Levies) (Amendment) Regulations 2006 (S.I. 2006/935)
- Loan Relationships and Derivative Contracts (Disregard and Bringing into Account of Profits and Losses) (Amendment) Regulations 2006 (S.I. 2006/936)
- Waste Management (England and Wales) Regulations 2006 (S.I. 2006/937)
- Children (Private Arrangements for Fostering) (Wales) Regulations 2006 (S.I. 2006/940)
- Functions of Local Health Boards and the NHS Business Services Authority (Awdurdod Gwasanaethau Busnes y GIG) (Primary Dental Services) (Wales) Regulations 2006 (S.I. 2006/941)
- Community Health Council (Establishment of Carmarthenshire Community Health Council, Transfer of Functions and Abolition of Llanelli/Dinefwr and Carmarthen/Dinefwr Community Health Councils) Order 2006 (S.I. 2006/942)
- National Health Service (Charges for Drugs and Appliances) (Wales) (Amendment) Regulations 2006 (S.I. 2006/943)
- Local Authorities (Capital Finance and Accounting) (Wales) (Amendment) Regulations 2006 (S.I. 2006/944)
- National Health Service (Performers Lists) (Wales) (Amendment) Regulations 2006 (S.I. 2006/945)
- General Dental Services and Personal Dental Services Transitional and Consequential Provisions (Wales) Order 2006 (S.I. 2006/946)
- National Health Service (General Dental Services Contracts and Personal Dental Services Agreements) (Amendment) (Wales) Regulations 2006 (S.I. 2006/947)
- Town and Country Planning (Fees for Applications and Deemed Applications) (Amendment) (Wales) Regulations 2006 (S.I. 2006/948)
- Public Services Ombudsman for Wales (Standards Investigations) Order 2006 (S.I. 2006/949)
- Housing (Right to Buy) (Priority of Charges) (Wales) Order 2006 (S.I. 2006/950)
- Offshore Installations (Safety Zones) (No.2) Order 2006 (S.I. 2006/952)
- Education (Student Support) (European Institutions) Regulations 2006 (S.I. 2006/953)
- Climate Change Levy (General) (Amendment) Regulations 2006 (S.I. 2006/954)
- Education (Student Support) (Amendment) Regulations 2006 (S.I. 2006/955)
- Guardian's Allowance Up-rating (Northern Ireland) Order 2006 (S.I. 2006/956)
- Guardian's Allowance Up-rating Order 2006 (S.I. 2006/957)
- Transport and Works (Assessment of Environmental Effects) Regulations 2006 (S.I. 2006/958)
- Income Tax (Trading and Other Income) Act 2005 (Consequential Amendments) Order 2006 (S.I. 2006/959)
- Special Health Authorities (Audit) Order 2006 (S.I. 2006/960)
- Social Fund (Application for Review) (Amendment) Regulations 2006 (S.I. 2006/961)
- Employment Zones (Allocation to Contractors) Pilot Regulations 2006 (S.I. 2006/962)
- Tax Credits Up-rating Regulations 2006 (S.I. 2006/963)
- Authorised Investment Funds (Tax) Regulations 2006 (S.I. 2006/964)
- Child Benefit (Rates) Regulations 2006 (S.I. 2006/965)
- Local Government Pension Scheme (Amendment) Regulations 2006 (S.I. 2006/966)
- Health Professions Wales Abolition Order 2006 (S.I. 2006/978)
- Local Government (Best Value Authorities) (Power to Trade) (Wales) Order 2006 (S.I. 2006/979)
- Welsh Regional Flood Defence Committee (Composition) Order 2006 (S.I. 2006/980)
- Unit Trust Schemes and Offshore Funds (Non-qualifying Investments Test) Order 2006 (S.I. 2006/981)
- Finance (No. 2) Act 2005, Section 17(1), (Appointed Day) Order 2006 (S.I. 2006/982)
- Information Sharing Index (England) Regulations 2006 (S.I. 2006/983)
- Water Act 2003 (Commencement No. 6, Transitional Provisions and Savings) Order 2006 (S.I. 2006/984)
- Pesticides (Maximum Residue Levels in Crops, Food and Feeding Stuffs) (England and Wales) (Amendment) Regulations 2006 (S.I. 2006/985)
- Misuse of Drugs (Amendment) Regulations 2006 (S.I. 2006/986)
- Serious Organised Crime and Police Act 2005 (Application and Modification of Certain Enactments to Designated Staff of SOCA) Order 2006 (S.I. 2006/987)
- Football Spectators (2006 World Cup Control Period) Order 2006 (S.I. 2006/988)
- Common Agricultural Policy Single Payment and Support Schemes (Amendment) (No. 3) Regulations 2006 (S.I. 2006/989)
- Access to the Countryside (Exclusions and Restrictions) (England) (Amendment) Regulations 2006 (S.I. 2006/990)
- Environmental Stewardship (England) and Countryside Stewardship (Amendment) Regulations 2006 (S.I. 2006/991)
- Town and Country Planning (Fees for Applications and Deemed Applications) (Amendment) (England) Regulations 2006 (S.I. 2006/994)
- Employment Zones (Amendment) Regulations 2006 (S.I. 2006/1000)

== 1001–1100 ==
- Courts Act 2003 (Consequential Amendment) Order 2006 (S.I. 2006/1001)
- Clean Neighbourhoods and Environment Act 2005 (Commencement No. 2, Transitional Provisions and Savings) (England and Wales) (Amendment) Order 2006 (S.I. 2006/1002)
- Immigration (European Economic Area) Regulations 2006 (S.I. 2006/1003)
- Renewables Obligation Order 2006 (S.I. 2006/1004)
- Disability Discrimination (Guidance on the Definition of Disability) Appointed Day Order 2006 (S.I. 2006/1005)
- Community Order (Review by Specified Courts in Liverpool and Salford) Order 2006 (S.I. 2006/1006)
- Disability Discrimination (Guidance on the Definition of Disability) Revocation Order 2006 (S.I. 2006/1007)
- Grants to the Churches Conservation Trust Order 2006 (S.I. 2006/1008)
- Social Security (Reduced Rates of Class 1 Contributions, Rebates and Minimum Contributions) Order 2006 (S.I. 2006/1009)
- Railway Safety Levy Regulations 2006 (S.I. 2006/1010)
- Public Services Ombudsman (Wales) Act 2005 (Consequential Amendments to the Local Government Pension Scheme Regulations 1997 and Transitional Provisions) Order 2006 (S.I. 2006/1011)
- Northern Ireland Act 2000 (Modification) Order 2006 (S.I. 2006/1012)
- Terrorism Act 2006 (Commencement No. 1) Order 2006 (S.I. 2006/1013)
- Constitutional Reform Act 2005 (Commencement No. 5) Order 2006 (S.I. 2006/1014)
- Nurses and Midwives (Parts of and Entries in the Register) Amendment Order of Council 2006 1015)
- Lord Chancellor (Transfer of Functions and Supplementary Provisions) (No.2) Order 2006 (S.I. 2006/1016)
- Social Security (Persons from Abroad) Amendment Regulations 2006 (S.I. 2006/1026)
- Community Trade Mark Regulations 2006 (S.I. 2006/1027)
- Intellectual Property (Enforcement, etc.) Regulations 2006 (S.I. 2006/1028)
- Trade Marks and Designs (Address For Service) (Amendment) Rules 2006 (S.I. 2006/1029)
- Cross-Border Insolvency Regulations 2006 (S.I. 2006/1030)
- Employment Equality (Age) Regulations 2006 S.I. 2006/1031)
- Communications Act 2003 (Maximum Penalty for Persistent Misuse of Network or Service) Order 2006 (S.I. 2006/1032)
- Education (Information as to Provision of Education) (England)(Amendment) Regulations 2006 (S.I. 2006/1033)
- Guardian's Allowance Up-rating Regulations 2006 (S.I. 2006/1034)
- Non-Domestic Rating (Alteration of Lists and Appeals) (Wales) (Amendment) Regulations 2006 (S.I. 2006/1035)
- Sheep and Goats (Records, Identification and Movement) (Wales) Order 2006 (S.I. 2006/1036)
- Gambling Act 2005 (Transitional Provisions) Order 2006 (S.I. 2006/1038)
- Copyright (Gibraltar) Revocation Order 2006 (S.I. 2006/1039)
- Scotland Act 1998 (Transfer of Functions to the Scottish Ministers etc.) (No. 2) Order 2006 (S.I. 2006/1040)
- Parliamentary Constituencies and Assembly Electoral Regions (Wales) Order 2006 (S.I. 2006/1041)
- Criminal Justice and Public Order Act 1994 (Suspension of Custody Officer Certificate) (Amendment) Regulations 2006 (S.I. 2006/1050)
- National Assistance (Assessment of Resources and Sums for Personal Requirements) (Amendment) (Wales) Regulations 2006 (S.I. 2006/1051)
- Town and Country Planning (Fees for Applications and Deemed Applications) (Amendment No.2) (Wales) Regulations 2006 (S.I. 2006/1052)
- Tuberculosis (Wales) Order 2006 (S.I. 2006/1053)
- Water Environment and Water Services (Scotland) Act 2003 (Consequential Provisions and Modifications) Order 2006 (S.I. 2006/1054)
- Management of Offenders etc. (Scotland) Act 2005 (Consequential Modifications) Order 2006 (S.I. 2006/1055)
- Smoking, Health and Social Care (Scotland) Act 2005 (Consequential Modifications) (England, Wales and Northern Ireland) Order 2006 (S.I. 2006/1056)
- Railways and Other Guided Transport Systems (Safety) (Amendment) Regulations 2006 (S.I. 2006/1057)
- Beer, Cider and Perry, Spirits, and Wine and Made-wine (Amendment) Regulations 2006 (S.I. 2006/1058)
- Dog Control Orders (Prescribed Offences and Penalties, etc.) Regulations 2006 (S.I. 2006/1059)
- Housing Act 2004 (Commencement No. 5 and Transitional Provisions and Savings)(England) Order 2006 (S.I. 2006/1060)
- Planning and Compulsory Purchase Act 2004 (Commencement No. 8 and Saving) Order 2006 (S.I. 2006/1061)
- Town and Country Planning (General Development Procedure) (Amendment) (England) Order 2006 (S.I. 2006/1062)
- Planning (Applications for Planning Permission, Listed Buildings and Conservation Areas) (Amendment) (England) Regulations 2006 (S.I. 2006/1063)
- Bridgend (Brackla and Coity Higher) Order 2006 (S.I. 2006/1064)
- National Health Service (Travel Expenses and Remission of Charges) Amendment Regulations 2006 (S.I. 2006/1065)
- National Savings Bank (Amendment) Regulations 2006 (S.I. 2006/1066)
- School Staffing (England) (Amendment) Regulations 2006 (S.I. 2006/1067)
- Education (Pupil Referral Units) (Application of Enactments) (England) (Amendment) Regulations 2006 (S.I. 2006/1068)
- Social Security (PPF Payments and FAS Payments) (Consequential Amendments) Regulations 2006 (S.I. 2006/1069)
- Proceeds of Crime Act 2002 (Money Laundering: Exceptions to Overseas Conduct Defence) Order 2006 (S.I. 2006/1070)
- International Development Association (Fourteenth Replenishment) Order 2006 (S.I. 2006/1071)
- Nobel School (Change to School Session Times) Order 2006 (S.I. 2006/1072)
- Education (Modification of Enactments Relating to Employment) (Wales) Order 2006 (S.I. 2006/1073)
- International Organisations (Immunities and Privileges) Miscellaneous Provisions Order 2006 (S.I. 2006/1075)
- Introductory Tenancies (Review of Decisions to Extend a Trial Period) (England) Regulations 2006 (S.I. 2006/1077)
- Monkseaton Community High School (Governing Body Procedures) Order 2006 (S.I. 2006/1078)
- Trade Marks (International Registration)(Amendment No.2) Order 2006 (S.I. 2006/1080)
- Police and Criminal Evidence (Northern Ireland) Order 1989 (Codes of Practice) (Temporary Modification to Code D) Order 2006 (S.I. 2006/1081)
- Equality Act 2006 (Commencement No.1) Order 2006 (S.I. 2006/1082)
- Fire and Rescue Services (National Framework) (England) Order 2006 (S.I. 2006/1084)
- Serious Organised Crime and Police Act 2005 (Commencement No. 6 and Appointed Day) Order 2006 (S.I. 2006/1085)
- Air Navigation (Dangerous Goods) (Amendment) Regulations 2006 (S.I. 2006/1092)
- Allocation of Housing and Homelessness (Amendment) (England) Regulations 2006 (S.I. 2006/1093)
- Disability Discrimination Code of Practice (Supplement to Part 3 Code of Practice) (Provision and Use of Transport Vehicles) (Appointed Day) Order 2006 (S.I. 2006/1094)
- M6 Motorway (Carlisle to Guards Mill Section) and Connecting Roads Scheme 2006 (S.I. 2006/1095)
- A74 Trunk Road (Carlisle to Guards Mill Section) (Detrunking) Order 2006 (S.I. 2006/1096)

== 1101–1200 ==
- Smoking, Health and Social Care (Scotland) Act 2005 and the Prohibition of Smoking in Certain Premises (Scotland) Regulations 2006 (Consequential Provisions) (Scotland) Order 2006 (S.I. 2006/1115)
- Criminal Justice Act 1988 (Reviews of Sentencing) Order 2006 (S.I. 2006/1116)
- Passenger and Goods Vehicles (Recording Equipment) (Fitting Date) Regulations 2006 (S.I. 2006/1117)
- London Olympic Games and Paralympic Games Act 2006 (Commencement No. 1) Order 2006 (S.I. 2006/1118)
- Olympics and Paralympics Association Rights (Appointment of Proprietors) Order 2006 (S.I. 2006/1119)
- Paralympics Association Right (Paralympic Symbol) Order 2006 (S.I. 2006/1120)
- Civil Partnership Act 2004 (Relationships Arising Through Civil Partnership) Order 2006 (S.I. 2006/1121)
- Associated British Ports (Hull) Harbour Revision Order 2006 (S.I. 2006/1135)
- Smoke Control Areas (Exempted Fireplaces) (England) Order 2006 (S.I. 2006/1152)
- Transport Act 2000 (Consequential Amendments) (Scotland) Order 2006 (S.I. 2006/1157)
- Seed Potatoes (Fees) (England) Regulations 2006 (S.I. 2006/1160)
- Seed Potatoes (England) Regulations 2006 (S.I. 2006/1161)
- Income Tax (Pension Funds Pooling Schemes) (Amendment) Regulations 2006 (S.I. 2006/1162)
- Child Tax Credit (Amendment No. 2) Regulations 2006 (S.I. 2006/1163)
- Education (Change of Category of Maintained Schools) (Amendment) (England) Regulations 2006 (S.I. 2006/1164)
- Countryside and Rights of Way Act 2000 (Commencement No. 11 and Savings) Order 2006 (S.I. 2006/1172)
- Natural Environment and Rural Communities Act 2006 (Commencement No. 1) Order 2006 (S.I. 2006/1176)
- Restricted Byways (Application and Consequential Amendment of Provisions) Regulations 2006 (S.I. 2006/1177)
- Protection of Wrecks (Designation) (England) (No. 1) Order 2006 (S.I. 2006/1178)
- Ceramic Articles in Contact with Food (England) Regulations 2006 (S.I. 2006/1179)
- Investment Trusts and Venture Capital Trusts (Definition of Capital Profits, Gains or Losses) Order 2006 (S.I. 2006/1182)
- Takeovers Directive (Interim Implementation) Regulations 2006 (S.I. 2006/1183)
- People's College, Nottingham (Dissolution) Order 2006 (S.I. 2006/1184)
- M6 Toll (Speed Limit) Regulations 2006 (S.I. 2006/1185)
- Avian Influenza and Influenza of Avian Origin in Mammals (England) Order 2006 (S.I. 2006/1197)
- Cosmetic Products (Safety) (Amendment) Regulations 2006 (S.I. 2006/1198)
- Nursing and Midwifery Council (Practice Committees) (Constitution) Rules Order of Council 2006 (S.I. 2006/1199)
- Welfare of Animals (Slaughter or Killing) (Amendment) (England) Regulations 2006 (S.I. 2006/1200)

== 1201–1300 ==
- Transmissible Spongiform Encephalopathies (Wales) Regulations 2006 (S.I. 2006/1226)
- Transmissible Spongiform Encephalopathies (No. 2) Regulations 2006 (S.I. 2006/1228)
- Registered Designs Act 1949 and Patents Act 1977 (Electronic Communications) Order 2006 (S.I. 2006/1229)
- Merchant Shipping (Oil Pollution) (Bunkers Convention) Regulations 2006 (S.I. 2006/1244)
- Merchant Shipping (Prevention of Air Pollution from Ships) Order 2006 (S.I. 2006/1248)
- Lebanon and Syria (United Nations Measures) (Isle of Man) Order 2006 (S.I. 2006/1249)
- Lebanon and Syria (United Nations Measures) (Channel Islands) Order 2006 (S.I. 2006/1250)
- Scotland Act 1998 (Agency Arrangements) (Specification) Order 2006 (S.I. 2006/1251)
- Planning Reform (Northern Ireland) Order 2006 (S.I. 2006/1252)
- Local Government (Boundaries) (Northern Ireland) Order 2006 (S.I. 2006/1253)
- Fire and Rescue Services (Northern Ireland) Order 2006 (S.I. 2006/1254)
- Measuring Instruments (Automatic Discontinuous Totalisers) Regulations 2006 (S.I. 2006/1255)
- Measuring Instruments (Automatic Rail-weighbridges) Regulations 2006 (S.I. 2006/1256)
- Measuring Instruments (Automatic Catchweighers) Regulations 2006 (S.I. 2006/1257)
- Measuring Instruments (Automatic Gravimetric Filling Instruments) Regulations 2006 (S.I. 2006/1258)
- Measuring Instruments (Beltweighers) Regulations 2006 (S.I. 2006/1259)
- Human Tissue Act 2004 (Ethical Approval, Exceptions from Licensing and Supply of Information about Transplants) Regulations 2006 (S.I. 2006/1260)
- Plant Breeders' Rights (Discontinuation of Prior Use Exemption) (Wales) Order 2006 (S.I. 2006/1261)
- Education (School Day and School Year) (Wales) (Amendment) Regulations 2006 (S.I. 2006/1262)
- Housing (Right to Buy) (Priority of Charges) (England) Order 2006 (S.I. 2006/1263)
- Measuring Instruments (Capacity Serving Measures) Regulations 2006 (S.I. 2006/1264)
- Merchant Shipping (Oil Pollution) (Supplementary Fund Protocol) Order 2006 (S.I. 2006/1265)
- Measuring Instruments (Liquid Fuel and Lubricants) Regulations 2006 (S.I. 2006/1266)
- Measuring Instruments (Material Measures of Length) Regulations 2006 (S.I. 2006/1267)
- Measuring Instruments (Cold-water Meters) Regulations 2006 (S.I. 2006/1268)
- Measuring Instruments (Liquid Fuel delivered from Road Tankers) Regulations 2006 (S.I. 2006/1269)
- Measuring Instruments (Non-Prescribed Instruments) Regulations 2006 (S.I. 2006/1270)
- Insolvency (Amendment) Rules 2006 (S.I. 2006/1272)
- Consumer Credit (Exempt Agreements) (Amendment) Order 2006 (S.I. 2006/1273)
- Education (School Teachers' Pay and Conditions) Order 2006 (S.I. 2006/1274)
- Local Authorities (Standing Orders) (Wales) Regulations 2006 1275)
- Credit Unions (Maximum Interest Rate on Loans) Order 2006 (S.I. 2006/1276)
- Education (Parenting Orders) (Wales) Regulations 2006 (S.I. 2006/1277)
- Anti-social Behaviour Act 2003 (Commencement No. 5) (Wales) Order 2006 (S.I. 2006/1278)
- Countryside and Rights of Way Act 2000 (Commencement No. 8 and Transitional Provisions) (Wales) Order 2006 (S.I. 2006/1279)
- Planning and Compulsory Purchase Act 2004 (Commencement No. 9 and Consequential Provisions) Order 2006 (S.I. 2006/1281)
- Town and Country Planning (Application of Subordinate Legislation to the Crown) Order 2006 (S.I. 2006/1282)
- Planning (Listed Buildings, Conservation Areas and Hazardous Substances) (Amendment) (England) Regulations 2006 (S.I. 2006/1283)
- Planning (National Security Directions and Appointed Representatives) (England) Rules 2006 (S.I. 2006/1284)
- A63 Trunk Road (East of Peckfield Bar to Boot & Shoe) (Detrunking) Order 2006 (S.I. 2006/1285)
- Protection of Water Against Agricultural Nitrate Pollution (England and Wales) (Amendment) Regulations 2006 (S.I. 2006/1289)
- Animal By-Products (Wales) Regulations 2006 (S.I. 2006/1293)
- Allocation of Housing and Homelessness (Eligibility) (England) Regulations 2006 (S.I. 2006/1294)
- Plant Protection Products (Amendment) Regulations 2006 (S.I. 2006/1295)

== 1301–1400 ==
- Sea Fishing (Restriction on Days at Sea) (Monitoring, Inspection and Surveillance) Order 2006 (S.I. 2006/1327)
- Terrorism Act 2000 (Revised Code of Practice for the Identification of Persons by Police Officers) (Northern Ireland) Order 2006 (S.I. 2006/1330)
- Export Control Order 2006 (S.I. 2006/1331)
- Land Registration Fee Order 2006 (S.I. 2006/1332)
- Sutton and East Surrey Water plc (Non-Essential Use) Drought Order 2006 (S.I. 2006/1333)
- Environmental Offences (Use of Fixed Penalty Receipts) Regulations 2006 (S.I. 2006/1334)
- Education (National Curriculum for Wales) Disapplication of Science at Key Stage 4) Regulations 2006 (S.I. 2006/1335)
- Education Act 2002 (Commencement No. 10 and Transitional Provisions) (Wales) Order 2006 (S.I. 2006/1336)
- Occupational Pension Schemes (Contracting-out) (Amendment) Regulations 2006 (S.I. 2006/1337)
- Education Act 2005 (Commencement No. 1 and Transitional Provisions) (Wales) Order 2006 (S.I. 2006/1338)
- Fish Labelling (Wales) (Amendment) Regulations 2006 (S.I. 2006/1339)
- Protection of Wrecks (Designation) (England) (No. 2) Order 2006 (S.I. 2006/1340)
- General Teaching Council for Wales (Additional Functions) (Amendment) Order 2006 (S.I. 2006/1341)
- Protection of Wrecks (Designation) (England) (No. 3) Order 2006 (S.I. 2006/1342)
- General Teaching Council for Wales (Functions) (Amendment) Regulations 2006 (S.I. 2006/1343)
- Plant Health ("Phytophthora ramorum") (Wales) Order 2006 (S.I. 2006/1344)
- A249 Trunk Road (Iwade Bypass to Queenborough Improvement) (Prohibition of Left and Right Hand Turns) Order 2006 (S.I. 2006/1345)
- A249 Trunk Road (Iwade Bypass to Queenborough Improvement) (50 Miles per Hour Speed Limit) Order 2006 (S.I. 2006/1346)
- A249 Trunk Road (Iwade Bypass to Queenborough Improvement) (Prohibition of Certain Classes of Traffic and Pedestrians) Order 2006 (S.I. 2006/1347)
- Fuel-testing Pilot Projects (Biogas Project) Regulations 2006 (S.I. 2006/1348)
- Products of Animal Origin (Third Country Imports) (Wales) (Amendment) (No. 2) Regulations 2006 (S.I. 2006/1349)
- Home-Grown Cereals Authority (Rate of Levy) Order 2006 (S.I. 2006/1357)
- Insurance Companies (Corporation Tax Acts) (Amendment) Order 2006 (S.I. 2006/1358)
- Clean Neighbourhoods and Environment Act 2005 (Commencement No. 2) (England) Order 2006 (S.I. 2006/1361)
- Radioactive Contaminated Land (Modification of Enactments) (England) Regulations 2006 (S.I. 2006/1379)
- Contaminated Land (England) Regulations 2006 (S.I. 2006/1380)
- Environmental Protection Act 1990 (Isles of Scilly) Order 2006 (S.I. 2006/1381)
- Natural Environment and Rural Communities Act 2006 (Commencement No. 2) Order 2006 (S.I. 2006/1382)
- Pensions Act 2004 (Codes of Practice) (Early Leavers, Late Payment of Contributions and Trustee Knowledge and Understanding) Appointed Day Order 2006 (S.I. 2006/1383)
- Civil Aviation (Safety of Third-Country Aircraft) Regulations 2006 (S.I. 2006/1384)
- National Health Service (Performers Lists) Amendment Regulations 2006 (S.I. 2006/1385)
- Town and Country Planning (Miscellaneous Amendments and Modifications relating to Crown Land) (Wales) Order 2006 (S.I. 2006/1386)
- Planning (National Security Directions and Appointed Representatives) (Wales) Regulations 2006 (S.I. 2006/1387)
- Planning (Listed Buildings, Conservation Areas and Hazardous Substances) (Amendments relating to Crown Land) (Wales) Regulations 2006 (S.I. 2006/1388)
- National Health Service (Travelling Expenses and Remission of Charges) (Amendment) (Wales) Regulations 2006 (S.I. 2006/1389)
- British Citizenship (Designated Service) Order 2006 (S.I. 2006/1390)
- Wireless Telegraphy (Pre-Consolidation Amendments) Order 2006 (S.I. 2006/1391)
- Protection of Wrecks (Designation) (England) (No. 4) Order 2006 (S.I. 2006/1392)
- Health Authorities (Membership and Procedure) Amendment (England) Regulations 2006 (S.I. 2006/1393)
- Diseases of Animals (Approved Disinfectants) (Amendment) (England) Order 2006 (S.I. 2006/1394)

== 1401–1500 ==
- Plastic Materials and Articles in Contact with Food (England) Regulations 2006 (S.I. 2006/1401)
- Social Security (Income Support and Jobseeker's Allowance) Amendment Regulations 2006 (S.I. 2006/1402)
- Transport (Wales) Act 2006 (Commencement) Order 2006 (S.I. 2006/1403)
- Borough of Corby (Electoral Changes) Order 2006 (S.I. 2006/1404)
- District of North Kesteven (Electoral Changes) Order 2006 (S.I. 2006/1405)
- Police (Complaints and Misconduct) (Amendment) Regulations 2006 (S.I. 2006/1406)
- National Health Service (Pre-consolidation Amendments) Order 2006 (S.I. 2006/1407)
- Strategic Health Authorities (Establishment and Abolition) (England) Order 2006 (S.I. 2006/1408)
- A1 Trunk Road (A1(M), A614 and B6045 Junction Improvement Blyth) Order 2006 (S.I. 2006/1417)
- Doncaster By-Pass Special Road Scheme 1957 (Variation) Scheme 2006 (S.I. 2006/1418)
- A1 Trunk Road (A1(M), A614 and B6045 Junction Improvement Blyth) (Detrunking) Order 2006 (S.I. 2006/1419)
- Immigration (Leave to Remain) (Prescribed Forms and Procedures) Regulations 2006 (S.I. 2006/1421)
- Southern Water Services (Sussex North and Sussex Coast) (Non-Essential Use) Drought Order 2006 (S.I. 2006/1422)
- Southern Water Services (Kent Medway, Kent Thanet and Sussex Hastings) (Non-Essential Use) Drought Order 2006 (S.I. 2006/1423)
- Mid Kent Water (Non-Essential Use) Drought Order 2006 (S.I. 2006/1424)
- Armed Forces and Reserve Forces (Compensation Scheme) (Amendment) Order 2006 (S.I. 2006/1438)
- Identity Cards Act 2006 (Commencement No. 1) Order 2006 (S.I. 2006/1439)
- General Dental Council (Professions Complementary to Dentistry) Regulations Order of Council 2006 (S.I. 2006/1440)
- Nursing and Midwifery Order 2001 (Transitional Provisions) (Amendment) Order of Council 2006 (S.I. 2006/1441)
- Police (Promotion) (Amendment) Regulations 2006 (S.I. 2006/1442)
- Road Traffic (Permitted Parking Area and Special Parking Area) (City of Derby) Order 2006 (S.I. 2006/1445)
- Road Traffic (Permitted Parking Area and Special Parking Area) (Metropolitan Borough of Kirklees) Order 2006 (S.I. 2006/1446)
- Bus Lane Contraventions (Approved Local Authorities) (England) (Amendment) (No. 2) Order 2006 (S.I. 2006/1447)
- Strategic Health Authorities (Establishment and Abolition) (England) Amendment Order 2006 (S.I. 2006/1448)
- Electromagnetic Compatibility (Amendment) Regulations 2006 (S.I. 2006/1449)
- Misuse of Drugs (Amendment No. 2) Regulations 2006 (S.I. 2006/1450)
- A550 and A5117 Trunk Roads (Improvement between M56 and A548) and Connecting Roads Order 2006 (S.I. 2006/1451)
- Exempt Charities Order 2006 (S.I. 2006/1452)
- Tax Information Exchange Agreement (Taxes on Income) (Gibraltar) Order 2006 (S.I. 2006/1453)
- Sudan (United Nations Measures) Order 2006 (S.I. 2006/1454)
- Naval, Military and Air Forces Etc. (Disablement and Death) Service Pensions (Amendment) (No. 2) Order 2006 (S.I. 2006/1455)
- Family Law Act 1986 (Dependent Territories) (Amendment) Order 2006 (S.I. 2006/1456)
- Parliamentary Corporate Bodies (Crown Immunities etc.) (Amendment) Order 2006 1457)
- National Assembly for Wales (Transfer of Functions) Order 2006 (S.I. 2006/1458)
- Private Tenancies (Northern Ireland) Order 2006 (S.I. 2006/1459)
- Education (Chief Inspector of Schools in England) Order 2006 (S.I. 2006/1460)
- European Communities (Designation) (No. 2) Order 2006 (S.I. 2006/1461)
- Wormley Recreation Ground (Revocation of Parish Council Byelaws) Order 2006 (S.I. 2006/1462)
- Restriction of the Use of Certain Hazardous Substances in Electrical and Electronic Equipment Regulations 2006 (S.I. 2006/1463)
- Contaminants in Food (England) Regulations 2006 (S.I. 2006/1464)
- Registered Pension Schemes (Authorised Reductions) Regulations 2006 (S.I. 2006/1465)
- Transport and Works (Applications and Objections Procedure) (England and Wales) Rules 2006 (S.I. 2006/1466)
- Police (Amendment) Regulations 2006 (S.I. 2006/1467)
- Protection of Wrecks (Designation) (England) (No. 5) Order 2006 (S.I. 2006/1468)
- Planning (Application to the Houses of Parliament) Order 2006 (S.I. 2006/1469)
- Protection of Wrecks (Designation) (England) (No. 6) Order 2006 (S.I. 2006/1470)
- Animals and Animal Products (Import and Export) (England) Regulations 2006 1471)
- Value Added Tax (Reduced Rate) Order 2006 (S.I. 2006/1472)
- Packaging (Essential Requirements) (Amendment) Regulations 2006 (S.I. 2006/1492)
- Care Standards Act 2000 (Establishments and Agencies) (Miscellaneous Amendments) Regulations 2006 (S.I. 2006/1493)
- Registration of Fish Buyers and Sellers and Designation of Fish Auction Sites (Wales) Regulations 2006 1495)
- British Nationality (Proof of Paternity) Regulations 2006 (S.I. 2006/1496)
- Immigration, Asylum and Nationality Act 2006 (Commencement No. 1) Order 2006 (S.I. 2006/1497)
- Nationality, Immigration and Asylum Act 2002 (Commencement No. 11) Order 2006 (S.I. 2006/1498)
- Common Agricultural Policy (Wine) (England and Northern Ireland) (Amendment) Regulations 2006 (S.I. 2006/1499)
- Radioactive Substances (Testing Instruments) (England and Wales) Exemption Order 2006 (S.I. 2006/1500)

== 1501–1600 ==
- National Health Service (Primary Medical Services and Pharmaceutical Services) (Miscellaneous Amendments) Regulations 2006 (S.I. 2006/1501)
- Home Information Pack Regulations 2006 (S.I. 2006/1503)
- Education (Individual Pupil Information) (Prescribed Persons) (Amendment) Regulations 2006 (S.I. 2006/1505)
- Specified Animal Pathogens (Amendment) (England) Order 2006 (S.I. 2006/1506)
- Education (Change of Category of Maintained Schools) (Amendment) (No.2) (England) Regulations 2006 (S.I. 2006/1507)
- Consumer Credit Act 2006 (Commencement No. 1) Order 2006 (S.I. 2006/1508)
- Local Government (Assistants for Political Groups) (Remuneration) (England) Order 2006 (S.I. 2006/1509)
- Ozone Depleting Substances (Qualifications) Regulations 2006 (S.I. 2006/1510)
- Salmonella in Broiler Flocks (Survey Powers) (Wales) Regulations 2006 (S.I. 2006/1511)
- Bovine Spongiform Encephalopathy (BSE) Compensation (Wales) Regulations 2006 (S.I. 2006/1512)
- Sheep and Goats Transmissible Spongiform Encephalopathy (TSE) Compensation (Wales) Regulations 2006 (S.I. 2006/1513)
- Road Traffic (Permitted Parking Area and Special Parking Area) (City of Kingston upon Hull) Order 2006 (S.I. 2006/1515)
- Bus Lane Contraventions (Approved Local Authorities) (England) (Amendment) (No. 3) Order 2006 (S.I. 2006/1516)
- Asylum and Immigration (Treatment of Claimants, etc.) Act 2004 (Commencement No. 6) Order 2006 (S.I. 2006/1517)
- Port of Blyth (Battleship Wharf Railway) Order 2006 (SI 2006/1518)
- Electricity and Gas Appeals (Modification of Time Limits) Order 2006 (S.I. 2006/1519)
- Child Support (Miscellaneous Amendments) Regulations 2006 (S.I. 2006/1520)
- Electricity Safety, Quality and Continuity (Amendment) Regulations 2006 (S.I. 2006/1521)
- Social Security (Categorisation of Earners) (Amendment) Regulations 2006 (S.I. 2006/1530)
- Social Security (Categorisation of Earners) (Amendment) (Northern Ireland) Regulations 2006 (S.I. 2006/1531)
- Street Works (Inspection Fees) (Wales) Regulations 2006 1532)
- Designation of Schools Having a Religious Character (Independent Schools) (England) Order 2006 (S.I. 2006/1533)
- Food Hygiene (Wales) (Amendment) Regulations 2006 (S.I. 2006/1534)
- Housing Act 2004 (Commencement No. 3 and Transitional Provisions and Savings) (Wales) Order 2006 (S.I. 2006/1535)
- Animals and Animal Products (Import and Export) (Wales) Regulations 2006 (S.I. 2006/1536)
- Constitutional Reform Act 2005 (Commencement No. 6) Order 2006 (S.I. 2006/1537)
- Cattle Identification (Amendment) Regulations 2006 (S.I. 2006/1538)
- Cattle Database (Amendment) Regulations 2006 (S.I. 2006/1539)
- Eggs (Marketing Standards) (Amendment) (England and Wales) Regulations 2006 (S.I. 2006/1540)
- Children (Allocation of Proceedings) (Amendment) Order 2006 (S.I. 2006/1541)
- The Civil Courts (Amendment) Order 2006 (S.I. 2006/1542)
- Tax Avoidance Schemes (Prescribed Descriptions of Arrangements) Regulations 2006 (S.I. 2006/1543)
- Tax Avoidance Schemes (Information) (Amendment) Regulations 2006 (S.I. 2006/1544)
- A419 Trunk Road (Blunsdon Bypass and Slip Roads) Order 2006 (S.I. 2006/1545)
- A419 Trunk Road (Blunsdon Bypass and Slip Roads) (Detrunking) Order 2006 (S.I. 2006/1546)
- Natural History Museum (Authorised Repositories) Order 2006 (S.I. 2006/1547)
- Immigration (Leave to Remain) (Prescribed Forms and Procedures) (Amendment) Regulations 2006 (S.I. 2006/1548)
- Sea Fishing (Marking and Identification of Passive Fishing Gear and Beam Trawls) (England) Order 2006 (S.I. 2006/1549)
- National Health Service (General Ophthalmic Services etc.) Amendment Regulations 2006 (S.I. 2006/1550)
- The Judicial Appointments and Discipline (Modification of Offices) (No. 2) Order 2006 (S.I. 2006/1551)

== 1601–1700 ==
- Disability Discrimination Act 1995 (Taxis) (Carrying of Guide Dogs etc.) (England and Wales) (Amendment) Regulations 2006 (S.I. 2006/1616)
- Disability Discrimination Act 1995 (Private Hire Vehicles) (Carriage of Guide Dogs etc.) (England and Wales) (Amendment) Regulations 2006 (S.I. 2006/1617)
- National Health Service Trusts (Dissolution) Order 2006 (S.I. 2006/1618)
- East of England Ambulance Service National Health Service Trust (Establishment) Order 2006 (S.I. 2006/1619)
- East Midlands Ambulance Service National Health Service Trust (Establishment) Order 2006 (S.I. 2006/1620)
- North East Ambulance Service National Health Service Trust (Establishment) Order 2006 (S.I. 2006/1621)
- North West Ambulance Service National Health Service Trust (Establishment) Order 2006 (S.I. 2006/1622)
- South East Coast Ambulance Service National Health Service Trust (Establishment) Order 2006 (S.I. 2006/1623)
- South Central Ambulance Service National Health Service Trust (Establishment) Order 2006 (S.I. 2006/1624)
- South Western Ambulance Service National Health Service Trust (Establishment) Order 2006 (S.I. 2006/1625)
- West Midlands Ambulance Service National Health Service Trust (Establishment) Order 2006 (S.I. 2006/1626)
- Yorkshire Ambulance Service National Health Service Trust (Establishment) Order 2006 (S.I. 2006/1627)
- London Ambulance Service National Health Service Trust (Establishment) Amendment Order 2006 (S.I. 2006/1628)
- Serious Organised Crime and Police Act 2005 (Amendment of Section 61(1)) Order 2006 (S.I. 2006/1629)
- General Chiropractic Council (Professional Conduct Committee and Health Committee) Amendment Rules Order of Council 2006 (S.I. 2006/1630)
- Motor Vehicles (Type Approval and Approval Marks) (Fees) (Amendment) Regulations 2006 (S.I. 2006/1638)
- Partnerships (Restrictions on Contributions to a Trade) Regulations 2006 (S.I. 2006/1639)
- Lord Chancellor (Transfer of Functions and Supplementary Provisions) (No. 3) Order 2006 (S.I. 2006/1640)
- Residential Property Tribunal Procedure (Wales) Regulations 2006 (S.I. 2006/1641)
- Residential Property Tribunal (Fees) (Wales) Regulations 2006 (S.I. 2006/1642)
- Plant Health (Wales) Order 2006 (S.I. 2006/1643)
- Companies (Disclosure of Information) (Designated Authorities) Order 2006 (S.I. 2006/1644)
- The Home Loss Payments (Prescribed Amounts) (England) Regulations 2006 (S.I. 2006/1658)
- Human Tissue Act 2004 (Persons who Lack Capacity to Consent and Transplants) Regulations 2006 (S.I. 2006/1659)
- Higher Education Act 2004 (Commencement No.2 and Transitional Provision) (Wales) (Amendment) Order 2006 (S.I. 2006/1660)
- Football Spectators (Seating) Order 2006 (S.I. 2006/1661)
- Safety of Sports Grounds (Designation) (No. 2) Order 2006 (S.I. 2006/1662)
- General Dental Council (Fitness to Practise) Rules Order of Council 2006 (S.I. 2006/1663)
- General Dental Council (Appointments Committee and Appointment of Members of Committees) Rules Order of Council 2006 (S.I. 2006/1664)
- General Dental Council (Constitution of Committees) Order of Council 2006 (S.I. 2006/1665)
- General Dental Council (Constitution) Order of Council 2006 (S.I. 2006/1666)
- General Dental Council (Professions Complementary to Dentistry) (Dental Hygienists and Dental Therapists) Regulations Order of Council 2006 (S.I. 2006/1667)
- General Dental Council (Registration Appeals) Rules Order of Council 2006 (S.I. 2006/1668)
- General Dental Council (Professions Complementary to Dentistry) (Qualifications and Supervision of Dental Work) Rules Order of Council 2006 (S.I. 2006/1669)
- General Dental Council (Professions Complementary to Dentistry) (Business of Dentistry) Rules Order of Council 2006 (S.I. 2006/1670)
- Dentists Act 1984 (Amendment) Order 2005 Transitional Provisions Order of Council 2006 (S.I. 2006/1671)
- Firefighters' Pension (Wales) Scheme (Amendment) Order 2006 (S.I. 2006/1672)
- Education (Designated Institutions) Order 2006 (S.I. 2006/1674)
- Cereal Seed (England) and Fodder Plant Seed (England) (Amendment) Regulations 2006 (S.I. 2006/1678)
- Measuring Instruments (Active Electrical Energy Meters) Regulations 2006 (S.I. 2006/1679)
- Health and Social Care (Community Health and Standards) Act 2003 Commencement (No. 9) Order 2006 (S.I. 2006/1680)
- Local Authority Social Services Complaints (England) Regulations 2006 (S.I. 2006/1681)
- Work and Families Act 2006 (Commencement No. 1) Order 2006 (S.I. 2006/1682)
- Value Added Tax (Place of Supply of Services) (Amendment) Order 2006 (S.I. 2006/1683)
- Civil Procedure (Amendment) Rules 2006 (S.I. 2006/1689)
- Pension Protection Fund (Pension Sharing) Regulations 2006 (S.I. 2006/1690)
- Contracting Out (Functions Relating to Child Support) Order 2006 (S.I. 2006/1692)
- Constitutional Reform Act 2005 (Supplementary Provisions) Order 2006 (S.I. 2006/1693)
- Representation of the People (Form of Canvass) (England and Wales) Regulations 2006 (S.I. 2006/1694)
- Motor Vehicles (EC Type Approval) (Amendment No. 2) Regulations 2006 (S.I. 2006/1695)
- Export Control (Security and Para-military Goods) Order 2006 (S.I. 2006/1696)
- A1 Trunk Road (A57 and A614 Junction Improvement Apleyhead) Order 2006 (S.I. 2006/1697)
- A1 Trunk Road (A57 and A614 Junction Improvement Apleyhead) (Detrunking) Order 2006 (S.I. 2006/1698)
- Proceeds of Crime Act 2002 (Recovery of Cash in Summary Proceedings: Minimum Amount) Order 2006 (S.I. 2006/1699)
- Planning and Compulsory Purchase Act 2004 (Commencement No. 4 and Consequential, Transitional and Savings Provisions) (Wales) (Amendment No. 2) Order 2006 (S.I. 2006/1700)

== 1701–1800 ==
- Plant Health (Export Certification) (Wales) Order 2006 (S.I. 2006/1701)
- Housing Health and Safety Rating System (Wales) Regulations 2006 (S.I. 2006/1702)
- Private and Voluntary Health Care and Miscellaneous (Wales) (Amendment) Regulations 2006 (S.I. 2006/1703)
- Ceramic Articles in Contact with Food (Wales) Regulations 2006 (S.I. 2006/1704)
- Local Safeguarding Children Boards (Wales) Regulations 2006 (S.I. 2006/1705)
- Housing (Interim Management Orders) (Prescribed Circumstances) (Wales) Order 2006 (S.I. 2006/1706)
- Houses in Multiple Occupation (Specified Educational Establishments) (Wales) Regulations 2006 (S.I. 2006/1707)
- Housing (Approval of Codes of Management Practice) (Student Accommodation) (Wales) Order 2006 (S.I. 2006/1709)
- Bee Diseases and Pests Control (Wales) Order 2006 (S.I. 2006/1710)
- Licensing of Houses in Multiple Occupation (Prescribed Descriptions) (Wales) Order 2006 (S.I. 2006/1712)
- Management of Houses in Multiple Occupation (Wales) Regulations 2006 (S.I. 2006/1713)
- Education (School Inspection) (Wales) Regulations 2006 (S.I. 2006/1714)
- Licensing and Management of Houses in Multiple Occupation and Other Houses (Miscellaneous Provisions) (Wales) Regulations 2006 (S.I. 2006/1715)
- Common Agricultural Policy (Wine) (Wales) (Amendment) Regulations 2006 (S.I. 2006/1716)
- Tir Gofal (Wales) (Amendment) Regulations 2006 (S.I. 2006/1717)
- European Qualifications (Professions Complementary to Dentistry) Regulations 2006 (S.I. 2006/1718)
- Technical Assistance Control Regulations 2006 (S.I. 2006/1719)
- Disability Discrimination Act 1995 (Amendment) (Further and Higher Education) Regulations 2006 (S.I. 2006/1721)
- Enterprise Act 2002 (Disqualification from Office: General) Order 2006 (S.I. 2006/1722)
- Occupational Pension Schemes (Winding up Procedure Requirement) Regulations 2006 (S.I. 2006/1733)
- Private and Voluntary Health Care (England) (Amendment No. 2) Regulations 2006 (S.I. 2006/1734)
- Financial Assistance for Environmental Purposes Order 2006 (S.I. 2006/1735)
- Traffic Management Act 2004 (Commencement No.1) (England) Order 2006 (S.I. 2006/1736)
- Collection of Fines (Final Scheme) Order 2006 (S.I. 2006/1737)
- Children Act 1989 Representations Procedure (England) Regulations 2006 (S.I. 2006/1738)
- Widnes and Runcorn Sixth Form College (Dissolution) Order 2006 (S.I. 2006/1739)
- Nottingham University Hospitals National Health Service Trust (Trust Funds: Appointment of Trustees) Order 2006 (S.I. 2006/1741)
- Pesticides (Maximum Residue Levels in Crops, Food and Feeding Stuffs) (England and Wales) (Amendment) (No. 2) Regulations 2006 (S.I. 2006/1742)
- Immigration (Provision of Physical Data) Regulations 2006 (S.I. 2006/1743)
- Education (Designated Institutions) (No. 2) Order 2006 (S.I. 2006/1744)
- Education (Student Support) (Amendment) (No. 2) Regulations 2006 (S.I. 2006/1745)
- Wimbledon School of Art Higher Education Corporation (Dissolution) Order 2006 (S.I. 2006/1746)
- Suffolk (Coroners' Districts) Order 2006 (S.I. 2006/1747)
- Revenue and Customs (Complaints and Misconduct) (Amendment) Regulations 2006 (S.I. 2006/1748)
- National Health Service (Optical Charges and Payments) (Amendment) (Wales) Regulations 2006 (S.I. 2006/1749)
- Value Added Tax (Lifeboats) Order 2006 (S.I. 2006/1750)
- Education (Pupil Registration) (England) Regulations 2006 (S.I. 2006/1751)
- Social Security (Students and Income-related Benefits) Amendment Regulations 2006 (S.I. 2006/1752)
- Borough of Eastbourne (Whole Council Elections) Order 2006 (S.I. 2006/1753)
- Josiah Mason Sixth Form College, Erdington, Birmingham (Dissolution) Order 2006 (S.I. 2006/1754)
- Mobile Homes Act 1983 (Amendment of Schedule 1) (England) Order 2006 (S.I. 2006/1755)
- Road Vehicles (Construction and Use) (Amendment) Regulations 2006 (S.I. 2006/1756)
- Horses (Zootechnical Standards) (England) Regulations 2006 (S.I. 2006/1757)
- Gambling Act 2005 (Transitional Provisions) (No. 2) Order 2006 (S.I. 2006/1758)
- Education (Outturn Statements) (England) Regulations 2006 (S.I. 2006/1760)
- Avian Influenza (Vaccination) (Wales) Regulations 2006 (S.I. 2006/1761)
- Avian Influenza and Influenza of Avian Origin in Mammals (Wales) Order 2006 (S.I. 2006/1762)
- Education (Student Support) (European Institutions) (Amendment) Regulations 2006 (S.I. 2006/1785)
- Courts-Martial (Prosecution Appeals) Order 2006 (S.I. 2006/1786)
- Tobacco Products and Excise Goods (Amendment) Regulations 2006 (S.I. 2006/1787)
- Courts-Martial (Prosecution Appeals) (Supplementary Provisions) Order 2006 (S.I. 2006/1788)
- Home Loss Payments (Prescribed Amounts) (Wales) Regulations 2006 (S.I. 2006/1789)
- Local Health Boards (Establishment) (Wales) (Amendment) Order 2006 (S.I. 2006/1790)
- Road Traffic (Permitted Parking Area and Special Parking Area)(County Borough of Conwy) Order 2006 (S.I. 2006/1791)
- National Health Service (Charges for Drugs and Appliances) (Wales) (Amendment) (No. 2) Regulations 2006 (S.I. 2006/1792)
- Value Added Tax (Refund of Tax) Order 2006 (S.I. 2006/1793)
- Assembly Learning Grants (European Institutions) (Wales) Regulations 2006 (S.I. 2006/1794)
- Education (Fees and Awards) (Amendment) (Wales) Regulations 2006 (S.I. 2006/1795)
- Sea Fishing (Northern Hake Stock) (Wales) Order 2006 (S.I. 2006/1796)

== 1801–1900 ==
- Private Security Industry Act 2001 (Designated Activities) (Amendment No. 2) Order 2006 (S.I. 2006/1804)
- Financial Services and Markets Act 2000 (Gibraltar) (Amendment) Order 2006 (S.I. 2006/1805)
- Wireless Telegraphy (Licence Award) (No. 2) Regulations 2006 (S.I. 2006/1806)
- Wireless Telegraphy (Spectrum Trading) (Amendment) (No. 2) Regulations 2006 (S.I. 2006/1807)
- Wireless Telegraphy (Register) (Amendment) (No. 2) Regulations 2006 (S.I. 2006/1808)
- Wireless Telegraphy (Limitation of Number of Spectrum Access Licences) Order 2006 (S.I. 2006/1809)
- Firefighters' Pension Scheme (Amendment) (England) Order 2006 (S.I. 2006/1810)
- Firefighters' Compensation Scheme (England) Order 2006 (S.I. 2006/1811)
- Education (Assisted Places) (Amendment) (England) Regulations 2006 (S.I. 2006/1812)
- Education (Assisted Places) (Incidental Expenses) (Amendment) (England) Regulations 2006 (S.I. 2006/1813)
- Private Security Industry Act 2001 (Amendments to Schedule 2) Order 2006 (S.I. 2006/1831)
- Mental Capacity Act 2005 (Independent Mental Capacity Advocates) (General) Regulations 2006 (S.I. 2006/1832)
- Design Right (Semiconductor Topographies) (Amendment) Regulations 2006 (S.I. 2006/1833)
- Free Zone Designations (Amendments) Order 2006 (S.I. 2006/1834)
- Criminal Justice Act 2003 (Commencement No. 13 and Transitional Provision) Order 2006 (S.I. 2006/1835)
- Representation of the People (Form of Canvass) (Scotland) Regulations 2006 (S.I. 2006/1836)
- National Health Service (Dental Charges) Amendment Regulations 2006 (S.I. 2006/1837)
- Inquiry Rules 2006 (S.I. 2006/1838)
- Local Justice Areas (No. 1) Order 2006 (S.I. 2006/1839)
- Export of Radioactive Sources (Control) Order 2006 (S.I. 2006/1846)
- Civil Procedure Act 1997 (Amendment) Order 2006 (S.I. 2006/1847)
- Climate Change Agreements (Miscellaneous Amendments) Regulations 2006 (S.I. 2006/1848)
- Standards Committees (Wales) (Amendment) Regulations 2006 (S.I. 2006/1849)
- Contaminants in Food (Wales) (No. 2) Regulations 2006 (S.I. 2006/1850)
- Kava-kava in Food (Wales) Regulations 2006 (S.I. 2006/1851)
- Fire and Rescue Services (Charging) (Wales) Order 2006 (S.I. 2006/1852)
- Assembly Learning Grants and Loans (Higher Education) (Wales) (Amendment) Regulations 2006 (S.I. 2006/1863)
- Smoke Control Areas (Authorised Fuels) (England) (Amendment) Regulations 2006 (S.I. 2006/1869)
- Serious Organised Crime and Police Act 2005 (Commencement) (No. 8) Order 2006 (S.I. 2006/1871)
- Regulation of Investigatory Powers (Directed Surveillance and Covert Human Intelligence Sources) (Amendment) Order 2006 (S.I. 2006/1874)
- Regulation of Investigatory Powers (Communications Data) (Additional Functions and Amendment) Order 2006 (S.I. 2006/1878)
- Plant Health (Import Inspection Fees) (England) Regulations 2006 (S.I. 2006/1879)
- Motor Vehicles (Wearing of Seat Belts) (Amendment) Regulations 2006 (S.I. 2006/1892)
- St John the Baptist Roman Catholic Primary School (Designation as having a Religious Character) Order 2006 (S.I. 2006/1893)
- Lowick Church of England Voluntary Controlled First School (Designation as having a Religious Character) Order 2006 (S.I. 2006/1894)
- St Georges VA Church Primary School (Designation as having a Religious Character) Order 2006 (S.I. 2006/1895)
- Hucknall National Church of England (VA) Primary School (Designation as having a Religious Character) Order 2006 (S.I. 2006/1896)
- Holy Trinity Rosehill (VA) CE Primary School (Designation as having a Religious Character) Order 2006 (S.I. 2006/1898)
- Great and Little Preston Voluntary Controlled Church of England Primary School (Designation as having a Religious Character) Order 2006 (S.I. 2006/1899)
- Blessed Trinity RC College (Designation as having a Religious Character) Order 2006 (S.I. 2006/1900)

== 1901–2000 ==
- Churchfields, The Village School (Designation as having a Religious Character) Order 2006 (S.I. 2006/1901)
- Saint Cecilia's, Wandsworth Church of England School (Designation as having a Religious Character) Order 2006 (S.I. 2006/1902)
- Bidston Church of England Primary School (Designation as having a Religious Character) Order 2006 (S.I. 2006/1903)
- Amesbury Church of England Voluntary Controlled Primary School (Designation as having a Religious Character) Order 2006 (S.I. 2006/1904)
- Belford St Mary's Church of England Voluntary Aided Middle School (Designation as having a Religious Character) Order 2006 (S.I. 2006/1905)
- Tauheedul Islam Girls High School (Designation as having a Religious Character) Order 2006 (S.I. 2006/1906)
- International Criminal Court (Immunities and Privileges) (No. 1) Order 2006 (S.I. 2006/1907)
- International Criminal Court (Immunities and Privileges) (No. 2) Order 2006 (S.I. 2006/1908)
- Belarus (Restrictive Measures) (Overseas Territories) Order 2006 (S.I. 2006/1909)
- Army, Air Force and Naval Discipline Acts (Continuation) Order 2006 (S.I. 2006/1910)
- Air Navigation (Overseas Territories) (Amendment) Order 2006 (S.I. 2006/1911)
- Consular Fees (Amendment) Order 2006 (S.I. 2006/1912)
- Turks and Caicos Islands Constitution Order 2006 (S.I. 2006/1913)
- Medical Act 1983 (Amendment) and Miscellaneous Amendments Order 2006 (S.I. 2006/1914)
- Education (Northern Ireland) Order 2006 (S.I. 2006/1915)
- Budget (No. 2) (Northern Ireland) Order 2006 (S.I. 2006/1916)
- Child Abduction and Custody Act 1985 (Jersey) Order 2006 (S.I. 2006/1917)
- Postal Services (Jersey) Order 2006 (S.I. 2006/1918)
- Proscribed Organisations (Name Changes) Order 2006 (S.I. 2006/1919)
- Education (Inspectors of Schools in England) (No.2) Order 2006 (S.I. 2006/1920)
- Films Co-Production Agreements (Amendment) Order 2006 (S.I. 2006/1921)
- European Organization for Nuclear Research (Privileges and Immunities) Order 2006 (S.I. 2006/1922)
- United Nations (International Tribunals) (Former Yugoslavia and Rwanda) (Amendment) Order 2006 (S.I. 2006/1923)
- Double Taxation Relief (Taxes on Income) (Japan) Order 2006 (S.I. 2006/1924)
- Double Taxation Relief (Taxes on Income) (Botswana) Order 2006 (S.I. 2006/1925)
- Secretary of State for Communities and Local Government Order 2006 (S.I. 2006/1926)
- Transfer of Functions (Statutory Instruments) Order 2006 (S.I. 2006/1927)
- Medicines for Human Use (Clinical Trials) Amendment Regulations 2006 (S.I. 2006/1928)
- Protection of Children and Vulnerable Adults and Care Standards Tribunal (Review of Disqualification Orders) Regulations 2006 (S.I. 2006/1929)
- Protection of Children and Vulnerable Adults and Care Standards Tribunal (Amendment) Regulations 2006 (S.I. 2006/1930)
- Climate Change Agreements (Eligible Facilities) (Amendment) Regulations 2006 (S.I. 2006/1931)
- Divorce etc. (Pension Protection Fund) Regulations 2006 (S.I. 2006/1932)
- Transport Act 2000 (Commencement No. 12) Order 2006 (S.I. 2006/1933)
- Dissolution etc. (Pension Protection Fund) Regulations 2006 (S.I. 2006/1934)
- Railways (Substitute Road Services) (Exemptions) Order 2006 (S.I. 2006/1935)
- Terrorism Act 2006 (Commencement No. 2) Order 2006 (S.I. 2006/1936)
- Passenger and Goods Vehicles (Recording Equipment) (Tachograph Card) Regulations 2006 (S.I. 2006/1937)
- Police and Criminal Evidence Act 1984 (Code of Practice C and Code of Practice H) Order 2006 (S.I. 2006/1938)
- Church of England (Legal Aid) (Amendment) Rules 2006 (S.I. 2006/1939)
- Legal Officers (Annual Fees) Order 2006 (S.I. 2006/1940)
- Care of Cathedrals Rules 2006 (S.I. 2006/1941)
- Parochial Fees Order 2006 (S.I. 2006/1942)
- Ecclesiastical Judges, Legal Officers and Others (Fees) Order 2006 (S.I. 2006/1943)
- Recovery of Health Services Charges (Northern Ireland) Order 2006 (S.I. 2006/1944)
- Law Reform (Miscellaneous Provisions) (Northern Ireland) Order 2006 (S.I. 2006/1945)
- Water and Sewerage Services (Miscellaneous Provisions) (Northern Ireland) Order 2006 (S.I. 2006/1946)
- Work and Families (Northern Ireland) Order 2006 (S.I. 2006/1947)
- Housing (Right to Buy)(Designated Rural Areas and Designated Region) (England) Order 2006 (S.I. 2006/1948)
- Offshore Installations (Safety Zones) (No.3) Order 2006 (S.I. 2006/1949)
- Derelict Land Clearance Area (Briar's Lane, Hatfield) Order 2006 (S.I. 2006/1950)
- Railways Act 2005 (Commencement No. 6) Order 2006 (S.I. 2006/1951)
- Medicines for Human Use (National Rules for Homoeopathic Products) Regulations 2006 (S.I. 2006/1952)
- Home Energy Efficiency Scheme (England) (Amendment) Regulations 2006 (S.I. 2006/1953)
- Transport and Works (Model Clauses for Railways and Tramways) Order 2006 (S.I. 2006/1954)
- A249 Trunk Road (Iwade Bypass to Queenborough Improvement) (Derestriction) Order 2006 (S.I. 2006/1955)
- A249 Trunk Road (Iwade Bypass to Queenborough Improvement) (24 Hours Clearway) Order 2006 (S.I. 2006/1956)
- Registered Pension Schemes (Extension of Migrant Member Relief) Regulations 2006 (S.I. 2006/1957)
- Pensions Schemes (Taxable Property Provisions) Regulations 2006 (S.I. 2006/1958)
- Investment-regulated Pension Schemes (Exception of Tangible Moveable Property) Order 2006 (S.I. 2006/1959)
- Pensions Schemes (Application of UK Provisions to Relevant Non-UK Schemes)(Amendment) Regulations 2006 (S.I. 2006/1960)
- Registered Pension Schemes (Provision of Information) (Amendment) Regulations 2006 (S.I. 2006/1961)
- Taxation of Pension Schemes (Transitional Provisions) (Amendment) Order 2006 (S.I. 2006/1962)
- Taxation of Pension Schemes (Consequential Amendments) (No. 2) Order 2006 (S.I. 2006/1963)
- Energy Act 2004 (Commencement No. 7) Order 2006 (S.I. 2006/1964)
- Parliamentary Pensions (Amendment) (No. 2) Regulations 2006 (S.I. 2006/1965)
- Disability Discrimination Code of Practice (Goods, Facilities, Services and Premises) (Revocation) Order 2006 (S.I. 2006/1966)
- Disability Discrimination Code of Practice (Services, Public Functions, Private Clubs and Premises) (Appointed Day) Order 2006 (S.I. 2006/1967)
- Social Landlords (Permissible Additional Purposes) (England) Order 2006 (S.I. 2006/1968)
- Financial Services and Markets Act 2000 (Regulated Activities) (Amendment) Order 2006 (S.I. 2006/1969)
- Sea Fishing (Enforcement of Annual Community and Third Country Fishing Measures) (England) Order 2006 (S.I. 2006/1970)
- Safety of Sports Grounds (Designation) (No. 3) Order 2006 (S.I. 2006/1971)
- Electoral Administration Act 2006 (Commencement No. 1 and Transitional Provisions) Order 2006 (S.I. 2006/1972)
- Regulatory Reform (Registered Designs) Order 2006 (S.I. 20061974)
- Registered Designs Rules 2006 (S.I. 20061975)
- General Lighthouse Authorities (Beacons: Automatic Identification System) Order 2006 (S.I. 2006/1977)
- Excise Duties (Surcharges or Rebates)(Hydrocarbon Oils etc.) Order 2006 (S.I. 2006/1979)
- Excise Duties (Road Fuel Gas) (Reliefs) Regulations 2006 (S.I. 2006/1980)
- Social Security (Lebanon) Amendment Regulations 2006 (S.I. 2006/1981)
- Health Professions (Parts of and Entries in the Register) (Amendment) Order of Council 2006 (S.I. 2006/1996)
- Human Tissue Act 2004 (Commencement No. 5 and Transitional Provisions) Order 2006 (S.I. 2006/1997)
- Motor Vehicles (Tests) (Amendment) Regulations 2006 (S.I. 2006/1998)
- Gaming Duty (Amendment) Regulations 2006 (S.I. 2006/1999)
- Gas Act 1986 (Exemption from the Requirement for an Interconnector Licence) Order 2006 (S.I. 2006/2000)

== 2001–2100 ==
- National Minimum Wage Regulations 1999 (Amendment) Regulations 2006 (S.I. 2006/2001)
- Electricity Act 1989 (Exemption from the Requirement for an Interconnector Licence) Order 2006 (S.I. 2006/2002)
- Social Security (Contributions) (Amendment No. 4) Regulations 2006 (S.I. 2006/2003)
- Taxation of Pension Schemes (Transitional Provisions) (Amendment No. 2) Order 2006 (S.I. 2006/2004)
- Central Leeds Learning Federation (Change to School Session Times) Order 2006 (S.I. 2006/2005)
- Clean Neighbourhoods and Environment Act 2005 (Commencement No. 3) (England) Order 2006 (S.I. 2006/2006)
- Allocation of Housing and Homelessness (Eligibility) (England) (Amendment) Regulations 2006 (S.I. 2006/2007)
- Local Government Pension Scheme (Amendment) (No. 2) Regulations 2006 (S.I. 2006/2008)
- Education (Student Loans) (Repayment) (Amendment) Regulations 2006 (S.I. 2006/2009)
- Electricity (Prepayment Meter) Regulations 2006 (S.I. 2006/2010)
- Gas (Prepayment Meter) Regulations 2006 (S.I. 2006/2011)
- Adoption and Children Act 2002 (Consequential Amendment to Statutory Adoption Pay) Order 2006 (S.I. 2006/2012)
- Blood Safety and Quality (Amendment) Regulations 2006 (S.I. 2006/2013)
- Maternity and Parental Leave etc. and the Paternity and Adoption Leave (Amendment) Regulations 2006 (S.I. 2006/2014)
- Police and Criminal Evidence Act 1984 (Application to the Armed Forces) Order 2006 (S.I. 2006/2015)
- Terrorism Act 2000 (Proscribed Organisations) (Amendment) Order 2006 (S.I. 2006/2016)
- Hovercraft (Fees) (Amendment) Regulations 2006 (S.I. 2006/2053)
- Merchant Shipping (Fees) Regulations 2006 (S.I. 2006/2055)
- European Cooperative Society (Involvement of Employees) Regulations 2006 (S.I. 2006/2059)
- Electricity (Offshore Generating Stations) (Applications for Consent) Regulations 2006 (S.I. 2006/2064)
- Export Control (Liberia) Order 2006 (S.I. 2006/2065)
- Vaccine Damage Payments (Specified Disease) Order 2006 (S.I. 2006/2066)
- Data Protection (Processing of Sensitive Personal Data) Order 2006 (S.I. 2006/2068)
- Primary Care Trusts (Establishment and Dissolution) (England) Order 2006 (S.I. 2006/2072)
- Medway Primary Care Trust (Establishment) Amendment Order 2006 (S.I. 2006/2073)
- Middlesbrough Primary Care Trust (Establishment) Amendment Order 2006 (S.I. 2006/2074)
- Environmental Stewardship (England) and Organic Products (Amendment) Regulations 2006 (S.I. 2006/2075)
- City and Hackney Primary Care Trust (Establishment) Amendment Order 2006 (S.I. 2006/2076)
- Primary Care Trusts Establishment Orders (Amendment) (England) Order 2006 (S.I. 2006/2077)
- European Cooperative Society Regulations 2006 (S.I. 2006/2078)
- Family Proceedings (Amendment) (No. 2) Rules 2006 (S.I. 2006/2080)
- Day Care and Child Minding (Registration Fees) (England) (Amendment) Regulations 2006 (S.I. 2006/2081)
- Quiet Lanes and Home Zones (England) Regulations 2006 (S.I. 2006/2082)
- Traffic Signs (Amendment) Regulations 2006 (S.I. 2006/2083)
- National Health Service (Complaints) Amendment Regulations 2006 (S.I. 2006/2084)

== 2101–2200 ==
- Medicines for Human Use (Fees Amendments) Regulations 2006 (S.I. 2006/2125)
- Animals and Animal Products (Import and Export) (England) (Amendment) Regulations 2006 (S.I. 2006/2126)
- Animals and Animal Products (Import and Export) (Wales) (Amendment) Regulations 2006 (S.I. 2006/2128)
- Education Act 2005 (Commencement No. 2 and Transitional Provisions and Savings) Order 2006 (S.I. 2006/2129)
- Radio Multiplex Services (Required Percentage of Digital Capacity) Order 2006 (S.I. 2006/2130)
- Television Licensable Content Services Order 2006 (S.I. 2006/2131)
- Northern Ireland Act 2000 (Modification) (No. 2) Order 2006 (S.I. 2006/2132)
- Education (School Teachers' Pay and Conditions) (No. 2) Order 2006 (S.I. 2006/2133)
- Road Traffic (Permitted Parking Area and Special Parking Area) (County of Wiltshire) (Districts of Kennet and North Wiltshire) Order 2006 (S.I. 2006/2134)
- Serious Organised Crime and Police Act 2005 (Appeals under Section 74) Order 2006 (S.I. 2006/2135)
- Drugs Act 2005 (Commencement No. 4) Order 2006 (S.I. 2006/2136)
- Crime and Disorder Act 1998 (Relevant Authorities and Relevant Persons) Order 2006 (S.I. 2006/2137)
- Crime and Disorder Act 1998 (Intervention Orders) Order 2006 (S.I. 2006/2138)
- Education (New Secondary School Proposals) (England) Regulations 2006 (S.I. 2006/2139)
- Waveney, Lower Yare, and Lothingland Internal Drainage Board Order 2006 (S.I. 2006/2140)
- Inheritance Tax (Delivery of Accounts) (Excepted Estates) (Amendment) Regulations 2006 (S.I. 2006/2141)
- Central Leeds Learning Federation (Change to School Session Times) (Revocation) Order 2006 (S.I. 2006/2142)
- Rehabilitation of Offenders Act 1974 (Exceptions) (Amendment) (England and Wales) Order 2006 (S.I. 2006/2143)
- Social Security (Adult Learning Option) Amendment Regulations 2006 (S.I. 2006/2144)
- Commons (Severance of Rights) (England) Order 2006 (S.I. 2006/2145)
- Finance Act 2006, section 18, (Appointed Day) Order 2006 (S.I. 2006/2149)
- Measuring Instruments (Exhaust Gas Analysers) Regulations 2006 (S.I. 2006/2164)
- Police and Criminal Evidence Act 1984 (Codes of Practice) (Revisions to Code A) Order 2006 (S.I. 2006/2165)
- Specified Diseases (Notification and Slaughter) Order 2006 (S.I. 2006/2166)
- Dover Harbour Revision Order 2006 (S.I. 2006/2167)
- Immigration (Notices) (Amendment) Regulations 2006 (S.I. 2006/2168)
- Human Tissue Act 2004 (Commencement No. 5 and Transitional Provisions) (Amendment) Order 2006 (S.I. 2006/2169)
- Immigration (Continuation of Leave) (Notices) Regulations 2006 (S.I. 2006/2170)
- National Health Service (Travel Expenses and Remission of Charges) Amendment (No. 2) Regulations 2006 (S.I. 2006/2171)
- A1 Trunk Road (B1174 Junction Improvement Gonerby Moor) (Detrunking) Order 2006 (S.I. 2006/2172)
- A1 Trunk Road (B1174 Junction Improvement Gonerby Moor) Order 2006 (S.I. 2006/2173)
- National Lottery Act 2006 (Commencement No. 1) Order 2006 (S.I. 2006/2177)
- Misuse of Drugs (Amendment No. 3) Regulations 2006 (S.I. 2006/2178)
- A595 Grizebeck to Chapel Brow Trunk Road (Parton to Lillyhall Improvement) Order 2006 (S.I. 2006/2179)
- A595 Grizebeck to Chapel Brow Trunk Road (Parton to Lillyhall Improvement) (Detrunking) Order 2006 (S.I. 2006/2180)
- Police Act 1997 (Criminal Records ) (Amendment No. 2) Regulations 2006 (S.I. 2006/2181)
- Serious Organised Crime and Police Act 2005 (Commencement No. 9 and Amendment) Order 2006 (S.I. 2006/2182)
- Merchant Shipping and Fishing Vessels (Provision and Use of Work Equipment) Regulations 2006 (S.I. 2006/2183)
- Merchant Shipping and Fishing Vessels (Lifting Operations and Lifting Equipment) Regulations 2006 (S.I. 2006/2184)
- Olympic Delivery Authority (Planning Functions) Order 2006 (S.I. 2006/2185)
- London Thames Gateway Development Corporation (Planning Functions) (Amendment) Order 2006 (S.I. 2006/2186)
- Value Added Tax (Treatment of Transactions and Special Provisions) (Amendment) Order 2006 (S.I. 2006/2187)
- Transport for London (Sloane Square House) Order 2006 (S.I. 2006/2188)
- Education (Pupil Exclusions and Appeals) (Miscellaneous Amendments) (England) Regulations 2006 (S.I. 2006/2189)
- Transport Security (Electronic Communications) Order 2006 (S.I. 2006/2190)
- Pig Carcase (Grading) (Amendment) (England) Regulations 2006 (S.I. 2006/2192)
- Education (Disqualification Provisions: Bankruptcy and Mental Health) (England) Regulations 2006 (S.I. 2006/2198)

== 2201–2300 ==
- Animal Gatherings (England) Order 2006 (S.I. 2006/2211)
- Hadley Learning Community (School Governance) Order 2006 (S.I. 2006/2212)
- Motor Vehicles (Wearing of Seat Belts by Children in Front Seats) (Amendment) Regulations 2006 (S.I. 2006/2213)
- Teachers' Pensions (Miscellaneous Amendments) (No. 2) Regulations 2006 (S.I. 2006/2214)
- School Crossing Patrol Sign (England and Wales) Regulations 2006 (S.I. 2006/2215)
- Teachers (Compensation for Redundancy and Premature Retirement) (Amendment) Regulations 2006 (S.I. 2006/2216)
- Immigration, Asylum and Nationality Act 2006 (Commencement No. 2) Order 2006 (S.I. 2006/2226)
- Town and Country Planning (Determination of Appeals by Appointed Persons) (Prescribed Classes) (Amendment) (England) Regulations 2006 (S.I. 2006/2227)
- European Communities (Recognition of Qualifications and Experience) (Third General System) (Amendment) Regulations 2006 (S.I. 2006/2228)
- Tonnage Tax (Training Requirement) (Amendment) Regulations 2006 (S.I. 2006/2229)
- A27 Trunk Road (Southerham to Beddingham Improvements) Order 2006 (S.I. 2006/2230)
- Cosmetic Products (Safety) (Amendment) (No. 2) Regulations 2006 (S.I. 2006/2231)
- Work and Families Act 2006 (Commencement No. 2) Order 2006 (S.I. 2006/2232)
- Capital Allowances (Energy-saving Plant and Machinery) (Amendment) Order 2006 (S.I. 2006/2233)
- Measuring Equipment (Liquid Fuel and Lubricants) (Amendment) Regulations 2006 (S.I. 2006/2234)
- Capital Allowances (Environmentally Beneficial Plant and Machinery) (Amendment) Order 2006 (S.I. 2006/2235)
- Statutory Paternity Pay and Statutory Adoption Pay (General) and the Statutory Paternity Pay and Statutory Adoption Pay (Weekly Rates) (Amendment) Regulations 2006 (S.I. 2006/2236)
- Specified Diseases (Notification and Slaughter) (Wales) Order 2006 (S.I. 2006/2237)
- Environmental Noise (England) Regulations 2006 (S.I. 2006/2238)
- A550 Trunk Road (Improvement between Deeside Park and Ledsham) (Detrunking) Order 1994 (Revocation) Order 2006 (S.I. 2006/2261)
- M56 Motorway (Hapsford to Lea-by-Backford Section) and Connecting Roads Scheme 1976 (Partial Revocation) Scheme 2006 (S.I. 2006/2262)
- Electoral Administration Act 2006 (Commencement No. 1 and Transitional Provisions) (Amendment) Order 2006 (S.I. 2006/2268)
- A38 Trunk Road (Dobwalls Bypass) Order 2006 (S.I. 2006/2269)
- A38 Trunk Road (Dobwalls Bypass) (Detrunking) Order 2006 (S.I. 2006/2270)
- Export Control (Amendment) Order 2006 (S.I. 2006/2271)
- Pensions Act 2004 (Commencement No. 10 and Saving Provision) Order 2006 (S.I. 2006/2272)
- Mobile Homes (Written Statement) (England) Regulations 2006 (S.I. 2006/2275)
- Police (Minimum Age for Appointment) Regulations 2006 (S.I. 2006/2278)
- Houses in Multiple Occupation (Specified Educational Establishments) (England) (No. 2) Regulations 2006 (S.I. 2006/2280)
- Charges for Residues Surveillance Regulations 2006 (S.I. 2006/2285)
- Food (Emergency Control) (Revocation) (England) Regulations 2006 (S.I. 2006/2289)
- Proscribed Organisations Appeal Commission (Human Rights Act 1998 Proceedings) Rules 2006 (S.I. 2006/2290)
- England Rural Development Programme (Closure of Project-Based Schemes) Regulations 2006 (S.I. 2006/2298)
- Proscribed Organisations (Applications for Deproscription etc.) Regulations 2006 (S.I. 2006/2299)

== 2301–2400 ==
- Measuring Instruments (Taximeters) Regulations 2006 (S.I. 2006/2304)
- Plant Health (England) (Amendment) Order 2006 (S.I. 2006/2307)
- Armed Forces Act 2001 (Commencement No. 7) Order 2006 (S.I. 2006/2309)
- Borough of Poole (Poole Harbour Opening Bridges) Order 2006 (S.I. 2006/2310)
- Pollution Prevention and Control (England and Wales) (Amendment) (England) Regulations 2006 (S.I. 2006/2311)
- Non-Domestic Rating (Alteration of Lists and Appeals) (England) (Amendment) Regulations 2006 (S.I. 2006/2312)
- Non-Domestic Rating (Small Business Rate Relief) (Amendment) (England) Order 2006 (S.I. 2006/2313)
- Seed (England) (Amendments for Tests and Trials etc.) Regulations 2006 (S.I. 2006/2314)
- Local Justice Areas (No. 2) Order 2006 (S.I. 2006/2315)
- Air Navigation (Amendment) Order 2006 (S.I. 2006/2316)
- Education (Inspectors of Schools in England) (No. 3) Order 2006 (S.I. 2006/2317)
- Council Tax (Exempt Dwellings) (Amendment) (England) Order 2006 (S.I. 2006/2318)
- Road Traffic (Permitted Parking Area and Special Parking Area) (County of Surrey) (District of Tandridge) Order 2006 (S.I. 2006/2319)
- Road Vehicles (Registration and Licensing) (Amendment) Regulations 2006 2320)
- African Development Fund (Multilateral Debt Relief Initiative) Order 2006 (S.I. 2006/2321)
- International Development Association (Multilateral Debt Relief Initiative) Order 2006 (S.I. 2006/2323)
- Asian Development Bank (Eighth Replenishment of the Asian Development Fund) Order 2006 (S.I. 2006/2324)
- Caribbean Development Bank (Sixth Replenishment of the Unified Special Development Fund) Order 2006 (S.I. 2006/2325)
- Criminal Justice and Public Order Act 1994 (Application to the Armed Forces) Order 2006 (S.I. 2006/2326)
- African Development Bank (Tenth Replenishment of the African Development Fund) Order 2006 (S.I. 2006/2327)
- Road Traffic (Permitted Parking Area and Special Parking Area) (County of Warwickshire) (Borough of Rugby) Order 2006 (S.I. 2006/2356)
- Environmental Impact Assessment (Agriculture) (England) Regulations 2006 (S.I. 2006/2362)
- Community Legal Service (Financial) (Amendment No.2) Regulations 2006 (S.I. 2006/2363)
- Community Legal Service (Funding) (Counsel in Family Proceedings) (Amendment) Order 2006 (S.I. 2006/2364)
- Community Legal Service (Funding) (Amendment) Order 2006 (S.I. 2006/2366)
- Finance Act 2006 (Tobacco Products Duty: Evasion) (Appointed Day) Order 2006 (S.I. 2006/2367)
- Tobacco Products (Amendment) Regulations 2006 (S.I. 2006/2368)
- Tobacco Advertising and Promotion Act 2002 etc. (Amendment) Regulations 2006 (S.I. 2006/2369)
- Cadishead Primary School (Change to School Session Times) Order 2006 (S.I. 2006/2370)
- Tobacco Advertising and Promotion Act 2002 (Commencement No. 9) Order 2006 (S.I. 2006/2372)
- Gangmasters (Licensing Conditions) (No. 2) Rules 2006 (S.I. 2006/2373)
- Caravan Sites Act 1968 and Social Landlords (Permissible Additional Purposes) (England) Order 2006 (Definition of Caravan) (Amendment) (England) Order 2006 (S.I. 2006/2374)
- Town and Country Planning (General Development Procedure) (Amendment) (No. 2) (England) Order 2006 (S.I. 2006/2375)
- Social Security Act 1998 (Commencement No. 14) Order 2006 (S.I. 2006/2376)
- Social Security (Miscellaneous Amendments) (No. 3) Regulations 2006 (S.I. 2006/2377)
- Social Security (Miscellaneous Amendments) (No. 4) Regulations 2006 (S.I. 2006/2378)
- Statutory Maternity Pay, Social Security (Maternity Allowance) and Social Security (Overlapping Benefits) (Amendment) Regulations 2006 (S.I. 2006/2379)
- Appointments Commission Regulations 2006 (S.I. 2006/2380)
- Education (Nutritional Standards for School Lunches) (England) Regulations 2006 (S.I. 2006/2381)
- Student Fees (Amounts) (England) (Amendment) Regulations 2006 (S.I. 2006/2382)
- Financial Services and Markets Act 2000 (Regulated Activities) (Amendment) (No. 2) Order 2006 (S.I. 2006/2383)
- Terrorism Act 2000 (Business in the Regulated Sector) Order 2006 (S.I. 2006/2384)
- Proceeds of Crime Act 2002 (Business in the Regulated Sector) Order 2006 (S.I. 2006/2385)
- Medicines (Advisory Board on the Registration of Homoeopathic Products) Amendment Order 2006 (S.I. 2006/2386)
- Collective Redundancies (Amendment) Regulations 2006 (S.I. 2006/2387)
- Electricity from Non-Fossil Fuel Sources Arrangements (England and Wales) Order 2006 (S.I. 2006/2388)
- Working Time (Amendment) (No.2) Regulations 2006 (S.I. 2006/2389)
- National Health Service (Clinical Negligence Scheme) (Amendment) Regulations 2006 (S.I. 2006/2390)
- Agricultural or Forestry Tractors (Emission of Gaseous and Particulate Pollutants) (Amendment) Regulations 2006 (S.I. 2006/2393)

== 2401–2500 ==
- Transfer of Undertakings (Protection of Employment) (Consequential Amendments) Regulations 2006 (S.I. 2006/2405)
- Gangmasters (Licensing) Act 2004 (Commencement No. 3) Order 2006 (S.I. 2006/2406)
- Veterinary Medicines Regulations 2006 (S.I. 2006/2407)
- Employment Equality (Age) (Amendment) Regulations 2006 (S.I. 2006/2408)
- Motor Vehicles (EC Type Approval) (Amendment No. 3) Regulations 2006 (S.I. 2006/2409)
- Registered Designs (Fees) Rules 2006 (S.I. 2006/2424)
- Race Relations Act 1976 (General Statutory Duty) Order 2006 (S.I. 2006/2470)
- Race Relations Act 1976 (Statutory Duties) Order 2006 (S.I. 2006/2471)
- EC Fertilisers (England and Wales) Regulations 2006 (S.I. 2006/2486)
- Criminal Defence Service (General) (No. 2) (Amendment) Regulations 2006 (S.I. 2006/2490)
- Criminal Defence Service Act 2006 (Commencement) Order 2006 (S.I. 2006/2491)
- Criminal Defence Service (Financial Eligibility) Regulations 2006 (S.I. 2006/2492)
- Criminal Defence Service (Representation Orders and Consequential Amendments) Regulations 2006 (S.I. 2006/2493)
- Criminal Defence Service (Representation Orders: Appeals etc.) Regulations 2006 (S.I. 2006/2494)
- Education (National Curriculum) (Exceptions at Key Stage 4) (Revocation and Savings) (England) Regulations 2006 (S.I. 2006/2495)
- M4 Motorway (Theale to Winnersh Section) Connecting Roads Scheme 1968 (Variation) Scheme 2006 (S.I. 2006/2496)
- Tandridge (Parishes) Order 2006 (S.I. 2006/2499)

== 2501–2600 ==
- Stockton-on-Tees Borough Council North Shore Development (North Shore Footbridge) Scheme 2006 Confirmation Instrument 2006 (S.I. 2006/2503)
- Commons Act 2006 (Commencement No. 1, Transitional Provisions and Savings) (England) Order 2006 (S.I. 2006/2504)
- Persons Subject to Immigration Control (Housing Authority Accommodation and Homelessness) (Amendment) Order 2006 (S.I. 2006/2521)
- Environmental Impact Assessment (Agriculture) (England) (No. 2) Regulations 2006 (S.I. 2006/2522)
- Ionising Radiation (Medical Exposure) (Amendment) Regulations 2006 (S.I. 2006/2523)
- Coventry and Warwickshire Partnership National Health Service Trust (Establishment) Order 2006 (S.I. 2006/2524)
- Refugee or Person in Need of International Protection (Qualification) Regulations 2006 (S.I. 2006/2525)
- Solihull Primary Care Trust (Change of Name) (Establishment) Amendment Order 2006 (S.I. 2006/2526)
- Allocation of Housing and Homelessness (Miscellaneous Provisions) (England) Regulations 2006 (S.I. 2006/2527)
- Social Security (Persons from Abroad) Amendment (No. 2) Regulations 2006 (S.I. 2006/2528)
- Social Security Act 1998 (Prescribed Benefits) Regulations 2006 (S.I. 2006/2529)
- Forest Reproductive Material (Great Britain) (Amendment) Regulations 2006 (S.I. 2006/2530)
- Cambridgeshire County Council (Construction of Cambridge Riverside Foot/Cycle Bridge) Scheme 2006 Confirmation Instrument 2006 (S.I. 2006/2531)
- Tractor etc. (EC Type-Approval) (Amendment) Regulations 2006 (S.I. 2006/2533)
- Protection of Wrecks (Designation) (England) (No. 7) Order 2006 (S.I. 2006/2535)
- Docklands Light Railway (Silvertown and London City Airport Extension) (Exemptions etc.) Order 2006 (S.I. 2006/2536)
- Isle of Wight National Health Service Primary Care Trust (Establishment) and Isle of Wight Healthcare National Health Service Trust and Isle of Wight Primary Care Trust (Dissolution) Order 2006 (S.I. 2006/2537)
- Medway Primary Care Trust (Establishment) Amendment (Consequential Amendments on Variation of Area) Order 2006 (S.I. 2006/2538)
- Middlesbrough Primary Care Trust (Establishment) Amendment (Consequential Amendments on Variation of Area) Order 2006 (S.I. 2006/2539)
- Social Security Act 1998 (Commencement Nos. 9 and 11) (Amendment) Order 2006 (S.I. 2006/2540)
- Natural Environment and Rural Communities Act 2006 (Commencement No. 3 and Transitional Provisions) Order 2006 (S.I. 2006/2541)
- Housing (Right to Buy) (Priority of Charges) (England) (No. 2) Order 2006 (S.I. 2006/2563)
- Road Vehicles (Construction and Use) and Motor Vehicles (Type Approval for Goods Vehicles) (Great Britain) (Amendment) Regulations 2006 (S.I. 2006/2565)

== 2601–2700 ==
- Education (Information About Individual Pupils) (England) Regulations 2006 (S.I. 2006/2601)
- Identity Cards Act 2006 (Commencement No. 2) Order 2006 (S.I. 2006/2602)
- Health Act 2006 (Commencement No. 1 and Transitional Provisions) Order 2006 (S.I. 2006/2603)
- Humber Sea Terminal (Phase III) Harbour Revision Order 2006 (S.I. 2006/2604)
- Horses (Zootechnical Standards) (Wales) Regulations 2006 (S.I. 2006/2607)
- Protection of Military Remains Act 1986 (Designation of Vessels and Controlled Sites) Order 2006 (S.I. 2006/2616)
- Registered Designs (Fees) (No. 2) Rules 2006 (S.I. 2006/2617)
- District of North Shropshire (Electoral Changes) (Amendment) Order 2006 (S.I. 2006/2618)
- Borough of Tunbridge Wells (Electoral Changes) (Amendment) Order 2006 (S.I. 2006/2619)
- Borough of Waverley (Electoral Changes) (Amendment) Order 2006 (S.I. 2006/2620)
- Measuring Instruments (Amendment) Regulations 2006 (S.I. 2006/2625)
- Channel Tunnel (International Arrangements) (Amendment) Order 2006 (S.I. 2006/2626)
- Channel Tunnel (Miscellaneous Provisions) (Amendment) Order 2006 (S.I. 2006/2627)
- Agricultural Holdings (Units of Production) (England) Order 2006 (S.I. 2006/2628)
- Environmental Noise (Wales) Regulations 2006 (S.I. 2006/2629)
- National Lottery Act 2006 (Commencement No. 2 and Transitional Provisions) Order 2006 (S.I. 2006/2630)
- Road Traffic (Permitted Parking Area and Special Parking Area) (Metropolitan Borough of Calderdale) Order 2006 (S.I. 2006/2631)
- Bus Lane Contraventions (Approved Local Authorities) (England) (Amendment) (No. 4) Order 2006 (S.I. 2006/2632)
- Criminal Procedure (Amendment No. 2) Rules 2006 (S.I. 2006/2636)
- Allocation of Housing (Wales) (Amendment) Regulations 2006 (S.I. 2006/2645)
- Homelessness (Wales) Regulations 2006 (S.I. 2006/2646)
- Measuring Instruments (Gas Meters) Regulations 2006 (S.I. 2006/2647)
- Social Fund Cold Weather Payments (General) Amendment Regulations 2006 (S.I. 2006/2655)
- European Convention on Cinematographic Co-production Order 2006 (S.I. 2006/2656)
- Terrorism (United Nations Measures) Order 2006 (S.I. 2006/2657)
- Education (Inspectors of Schools in England) (No. 4) Order 2006 (S.I. 2006/2658)
- Northern Ireland Act 1998 (Modification) Order 2006 (S.I. 2006/2659)
- Education (Inspectors of Education and Training in Wales) Order 2006 (S.I. 2006/2660)
- Education (School Teacher Performance Management) (England) Regulations 2006 (S.I. 2006/2661)
- Domestic Violence, Crime and Victims Act 2004 (Commencement No. 6) Order 2006 (S.I. 2006/2662)
- Gaming Act 1968 (Variation of Monetary Limits) Order 2006 (S.I. 2006/2663)
- Local Probation Boards (Appointment and Miscellaneous Provisions) (Amendment) Regulations 2006 (S.I. 2006/2664)
- Airports Slot Allocation Regulations 2006 (S.I. 2006/2665)
- Measuring Instruments (EEC Requirements) (Fees) (Amendment No. 2) Regulations 2006 (S.I. 2006/2679)
- Motor Vehicles (Tests) (Amendment) (No. 2) Regulations 2006 (S.I. 2006/2680)
- Lebanon (Technical Assistance, Financing and Financial Assistance) (Penalties and Licences) Regulations 2006 (S.I. 2006/2681)
- Burma (Sale, Supply, Export, Technical Assistance, Financing and Financial Assistance) (Penalties and Licences) Regulations 2006 (S.I. 2006/2682)
- Export Control (Lebanon, etc.) Order 2006 (S.I. 2006/2683)
- Child Trust Funds (Amendment No. 2) Regulations 2006 (S.I. 2006/2684)
- Value Added Tax (Betting, Gaming and Lotteries) Order 2006 (S.I. 2006/2685)
- Value Added Tax (Gaming Machines) Order 2006 (S.I. 2006/2686)
- Plastic Materials and Articles in Contact with Food (England) (No. 2) Regulations 2006 (S.I. 2006/2687)
- Northern Ireland (Miscellaneous Provisions) Act 2006 (Commencement No.1) Order 2006 (S.I. 2006/2688)
- Tax Credits (Claims and Notifications) (Amendment) Regulations 2006 (S.I. 2006/2689)
- Nottingham University Hospitals National Health Service Trust (Transfer of Trust Property) Order 2006 (S.I. 2006/2690)
- Special Trustees for the Queen's Medical Centre, Nottingham, University Hospital National Health Service Trust (Transfer of Trust Property) Order 2006 (S.I. 2006/2691)
- Pension Protection Fund (Levy Ceiling) Regulations 2006 (S.I. 2006/2692)
- Air Passenger Duty (Rate) (Qualifying Territories) Order 2006 (S.I. 2006/2693)
- Plant Health (Wood Packaging Material Marking) (Forestry) Order 2006 (S.I. 2006/2695)
- Plant Health (Forestry) (Amendment) Order 2006 (S.I. 2006/2696)
- Plant Health (Fees) (Forestry) Regulations 2006 (S.I. 2006/2697)
- Paying Agency (National Assembly for Wales) (Amendment) Regulations 2006 (S.I. 2006/2698)
- Commissioner for Older People (Wales) Act 2006 (Commencement) Order 2006 (S.I. 2006/2699)
- Insurance Premium Tax (Amendment) Regulations 2006 (S.I. 2006/2700)

== 2701–2800 ==
- Avian Influenza (Preventive Measures) (England) Regulations 2006 (S.I. 2006/2701)
- Avian Influenza and Influenza of Avian Origin in Mammals (England) (No.2) Order 2006 (S.I. 2006/2702)
- Avian Influenza (Vaccination) (England) Regulations 2006 (S.I. 2006/2703)
- Smoke Control Areas (Exempted Fireplaces) (England) (No. 2) Order 2006 (S.I. 2006/2704)
- Meat (Official Controls Charges) (England) Regulations 2006 (S.I. 2006/2705)
- Control of Asbestos Regulations 2006 (S.I. 2006/2739)
- Equine Infectious Anaemia (Compensation) (England) Order 2006 (S.I. 2006/2740)
- Companies Act 1985 (Small Companies' Accounts and Audit) Regulations 2006 (S.I. 2006/2782)
- A69 Carlisle to Newcastle Trunk Road (Haydon Bridge Bypass) Order 2006 (S.I. 2006/2783)
- A69 Carlisle to Newcastle Trunk Road (Haydon Bridge Bypass) (Detrunking) Order 2006 (S.I. 2006/2784)
- Wireless Telegraphy (Licensing Procedures) Regulations 2006 (S.I. 2006/2785)
- Wireless Telegraphy (Limitation of Number of Licences) (Amendment) Order 2006 (S.I. 2006/2786)
- Curd Cheese (Restriction on Placing on the Market) (England) Regulations 2006 (S.I. 2006/2787)
- Asylum and Immigration Tribunal (Procedure) (Amendment) Rules 2006 (S.I. 2006/2788)
- Asylum and Immigration Tribunal (Fast Track Procedure) (Amendment) Rules 2006 (S.I. 2006/2789)
- Devon and Somerset Fire and Rescue Authority (Combination Scheme) Order 2006 (S.I. 2006/2790)
- National Health Service (Travelling Expenses and Remission of Charges) (Amendment) (No. 2) Regulations 2006 (S.I. 2006/2791)
- Curd Cheese (Restriction on Placing on the Market) (Wales) Regulations 2006 (S.I. 2006/2792)
- Broadcasting Digital Terrestrial Sound (Technical Service) Order 2006 (S.I. 2006/2793)
- Offshore Installations (Safety Zones) (No.4) Order 2006 (S.I. 2006/2794)
- Agricultural Holdings (Units of Production) (Wales) Order 2006 (S.I. 2006/2796)
- Clean Neighbourhoods and Environment Act 2005 (Commencement No. 2, Transitional Provisions and Savings) (Wales) Order 2006 (S.I. 2006/2797)
- Sea Fishing (Enforcement of Community Satellite Monitoring Measures) (Wales) Order 2006 (S.I. 2006/2798)
- Fishing Boats (Satellite-Tracking Devices) (Wales) Scheme 2006 (S.I. 2006/2799)
- Housing Renewal Grants (Prescribed Form and Particulars) (Amendment) (Wales) Regulations 2006 (S.I. 2006/2800)

== 2801–2900 ==
- Housing Renewal Grants (Amendment) (Wales) Regulations 2006 (S.I. 2006/2801)
- Pollution Prevention and Control (England and Wales) (Amendment) (Wales) Regulations 2006 (S.I. 2006/2802)
- Avian Influenza (Preventive Measures) (Wales) Regulations 2006 (S.I. 2006/2803)
- Youth and Community Work Education and Training (Inspection) (Wales) Regulations 2006 (S.I. 2006/2804)
- Regulatory Reform (Agricultural Tenancies) (England and Wales) Order 2006 (S.I. 2006/2805)
- Medicines (Administration of Radioactive Substances) Amendment Regulations 2006 (S.I. 2006/2806)
- Medicines for Human Use (Administration and Sale or Supply) (Miscellaneous Amendments) Order 2006 (S.I. 2006/2807)
- Feeding Stuffs (England) (Amendment) Regulations 2006 (S.I. 2006/2808)
- Registration of Births and Deaths (Electronic Communications and Electronic Storage) Order 2006 (S.I. 2006/2809)
- Mental Capacity Act 2005 (Appropriate Body) (England) Regulations 2006 (S.I. 2006/2810)
- Crime (International Co-operation) Act 2003 (Commencement No. 3) Order 2006 (S.I. 2006/2811)
- Housing Benefit and Council Tax Benefit (Amendment) Regulations 2006 (S.I. 2006/2813)
- Mental Capacity Act 2005 (Commencement No.1) Order 2006 (S.I. 2006/2814)
- Nuclear Industries Security (Amendment) Regulations 2006 (S.I. 2006/2815)
- Motor Vehicles (EC Type Approval) (Amendment No. 4) Regulations 2006 (S.I. 2006/2816)
- Health and Social Care (Community Health and Standards) Act 2003 (Commencement) (No. 10) Order 2006 (S.I. 2006/2817)
- Healthy Start Scheme and Welfare Food (Amendment No. 2) Regulations 2006 (S.I. 2006/2818)
- Road Traffic (Permitted Parking Area and Special Parking Area) (County of Shropshire) Order 2006 (S.I. 2006/2819)
- Bus Lane Contraventions (Approved Local Authorities) (England) (Amendment) (No. 5) Order 2006 2820)
- Salmonella in Turkey Flocks and Slaughter Pigs (Survey Powers) (England) Regulations 2006 (S.I. 2006/2821)
- Housing (Management Orders and Empty Dwelling Management Orders) (Supplemental Provisions) (Wales) Regulations 2006 (S.I. 2006/2822)
- Housing (Empty Dwelling Management Orders) (Prescribed Exceptions and Requirements) (Wales) Order 2006 (S.I. 2006/2823)
- Selective Licensing of Houses (Specified Exemptions) (Wales) Order 2006 (S.I. 2006/2824)
- Selective Licensing of Houses (Additional Conditions) (Wales) Order 2006 (S.I. 2006/2825)
- Traffic Management Act 2004 (Commencement No. 1) (Wales) Order 2006 (S.I. 2006/2826)
- Registration of Births and Deaths (Amendment) Regulations 2006 (S.I. 2006/2827)
- Supply Of Student Support Information To Governing Bodies (Wales) Regulations 2006 (S.I. 2006/2828)
- Social Security (Contributions) (Amendment No. 5) Regulations 2006 (S.I. 2006/2829)
- Food (Emergency Control) (Revocation) (Wales) Regulations 2006 (S.I. 2006/2830)
- Common Agricultural Policy Single Payment and Support Schemes (Cross Compliance) (Wales) (Amendment) Regulations 2006 2831)
- Plant Health (Import Inspection Fees) (Wales) (No. 2) Regulations 2006 (S.I. 2006/2832)
- Ordnance Survey Trading Fund (Maximum Borrowing) Order 2006 (S.I. 2006/2835)
- Closures Guidance (Railway Services in England and Wales) Order 2006 (S.I. 2006/2836)
- Closures Guidance (Railway Services in Scotland and England) Order 2006 (S.I. 2006/2837)
- Immigration, Asylum and Nationality Act 2006 (Commencement No. 3) Order 2006 (S.I. 2006/2838)
- Social Security (Graduated Retirement Benefit) (Consequential Provisions) Order 2006 (S.I. 2006/2839)
- Community Care, Services for Carers and Children's Services (Direct Payments) (Wales) Amendment Regulations 2006 (S.I. 2006/2840)
- Products of Animal Origin (Third Country Imports) (England) Regulations 2006 (S.I. 2006/2841)
- A1 Trunk Road (A57, A638 and B1164 Junction Improvement Markham Moor) Order 2006 (S.I. 2006/2861)
- A1 Trunk Road (A57, A638 and B1164 Junction Improvement Markham Moor) (Detrunking) Order 2006 (S.I. 2006/2862)
- Real Estate Investment Trusts (Breach of Conditions) Regulations 2006 (S.I. 2006/2864)
- Real Estate Investment Trusts (Financial Statements of Group Real Estate Investment Trusts) Regulations 2006 (S.I. 2006/2865)
- Real Estate Investment Trusts (Joint Ventures) Regulations 2006 (S.I. 2006/2866)
- Real Estate Investment Trusts (Assessment and Recovery of Tax) Regulations 2006 (S.I. 2006/2867)
- Mental Capacity Act 2005 (Independent Mental Capacity Advocates) (Expansion of Role) Regulations 2006 (S.I. 2006/2883)
- Youth Justice and Criminal Evidence Act 1999 (Commencement No. 12) Order 2006 (S.I. 2006/2885)
- Youth Justice and Criminal Evidence Act 1999 (Application to Courts-Martial) Order 2006 (S.I. 2006/2886)
- Youth Justice and Criminal Evidence Act 1999 (Application to the Courts-Martial Appeal Court) Order 2006 (S.I. 2006/2887)
- Youth Justice and Criminal Evidence Act 1999 (Application to Standing Civilian Courts) Order 2006 (S.I. 2006/2888)
- Courts-Martial (Royal Navy, Army and Royal Air Force) (Evidence) Rules 2006 (S.I. 2006/2889)
- Criminal Justice Act 1988 (Application to Service Courts) (Evidence) Order 2006 (S.I. 2006/2890)
- Standing Civilian Courts (Evidence) Rules 2006 (S.I. 2006/2891)
- Pensions Appeal Tribunals (Armed Forces and Reserve Forces Compensation Scheme) (Rights of Appeal) Amendment Regulations 2006 (S.I. 2006/2892)
- Pensions Appeal Tribunals (Additional Rights of Appeal) (Amendment) Regulations 2006 (S.I. 2006/2893)
- Wireless Telegraphy (Licence Charges) (Amendment) Regulations 2006 (S.I. 2006/2894)
- Education Act 2002 (Commencement No.9 and Savings) Order 2006 (S.I. 2006/2895)
- Education (School Performance Information) (England) (Amendment) Regulations 2006 (S.I. 2006/2896)
- Social Security (National Insurance Numbers) Amendment Regulations 2006 (S.I. 2006/2897)
- Asylum and Immigration Tribunal (Fast Track Procedure) (Amendment No. 2) Rules 2006 (S.I. 2006/2898)
- Immigration (Leave to Remain) (Prescribed Forms and Procedures) (Amendment No. 2) Regulations 2006 (S.I. 2006/2899)

== 2901–3000 ==
- General Optical Council (Continuing Education and Training) (Amendment No. 2) Rules Order of Council 2006 (S.I. 2006/2901)
- Value Added Tax (Amendment) (No. 2) Regulations 2006 (S.I. 2006/2902)
- Fishery Products (Official Controls Charges) (England) Regulations 2006 (S.I. 2006/2904)
- Docklands Light Railway (Stratford International Extension) Order 2006 (S.I. 2006/2905)
- Gangmasters (Licensing) Act 2004 (Commencement No. 4) Order 2006 (S.I. 2006/2906)
- Cosmetic Products (Safety) (Amendment) (No. 3) Regulations 2006 (S.I. 2006/2907)
- Nationality, Immigration and Asylum Act 2002 (Juxtaposed Controls) (Amendment) Order 2006 (S.I. 2006/2908)
- Enterprise Act 2002 (Part 9 Restrictions on Disclosure of Information) (Amendment) Order 2006 (S.I. 2006/2909)
- Representation of the People (England and Wales) (Amendment) (No. 2) Regulations 2006 (S.I. 2006/2910)
- Railways Act 2005 (Commencement No. 7, Transitional and Saving Provisions) Order 2006 (S.I. 2006/2911)
- M53 Motorway (Bidston Moss Viaduct) (50 Miles per Hour Speed Limit) Regulations 2006 (S.I. 2006/2912)
- Scotland Act 1998 (River Tweed) Order 2006 (SI 2006/2913)
- Local Government (Early Termination of Employment) (Discretionary Compensation) (England and Wales) Regulations 2006 (S.I. 2006/2914)
- National Lottery Distributors Dissolution Order 2006 (S.I. 2006/2915)
- Dangerous Substances and Preparations (Safety) Regulations 2006 (S.I. 2006/2916)
- Royal Marines Terms of Service Regulations 2006 (S.I. 2006/2917)
- Royal Navy Terms of Service (Ratings) Regulations 2006 (S.I. 2006/2918)
- National Health Service (Pension Scheme and Compensation for Premature Retirement) Amendment Regulations 2006 (S.I. 2006/2919)
- Civil Courts (Amendment No.2) Order 2006 (S.I. 2006/2920)
- Rice Products (Restriction on First Placing on the Market) (England) Regulations 2006 (S.I. 2006/2921)
- Pesticides (Maximum Residue Levels in Crops, Food and Feeding Stuffs) (England and Wales) (Amendment) (No. 3) Regulations 2006 (S.I. 2006/2922)
- Rice Products (Restriction on First Placing on the Market) (Wales) Regulations 2006 (S.I. 2006/2923)
- Social Security (Contributions) (Amendment No. 6) Regulations 2006 (S.I. 2006/2924)
- Railways (Abolition of the Strategic Rail Authority) Order 2006 (S.I. 2006/2925)
- Avian Influenza and Influenza of Avian Origin in Mammals (Wales) (No. 2) Order 2006 (S.I. 2006/2927)
- Seed Potatoes (Wales) Regulations 2006 (S.I. 2006/2929)
- Sex Discrimination Act 1975 (Public Authorities) (Statutory Duties) Order 2006 (S.I. 2006/2930)
- Employment Equality (Age) (Amendment No.2) Regulations 2006 (S.I. 2006/2931)
- Avian Influenza (Vaccination) (Wales) (No. 2) Regulations 2006 (S.I. 2006/2932)
- Plant Protection Products (Amendment) (No. 2) Regulations 2006 (S.I. 2006/2933)
- Street Works (Reinstatement) (Amendment) (Wales) Regulations 2006 2934)
- Motor Cycles Etc. (EC Type Approval) (Amendment) Regulations 2006 (S.I. 2006/2935)
- Lincolnshire County Council Car Dyke Crossing Bridge Scheme 2004 Confirmation Instrument 2006 (S.I. 2006/2936)
- Pensions Act 2004 (Disclosure of Restricted Information) (Amendment of Specified Persons) Order 2006 (S.I. 2006/2937)
- Bradford Cathedral Community College (Designation as having a Religious Character) Order 2006 (S.I. 2006/2938)
- Christ College, Cheltenham (Designation as having a Religious Character) Order 2006 (S.I. 2006/2939)
- Crawley Down Village CE School (Designation as having a Religious Character) Order 2006 (S.I. 2006/2940)
- Farnsfield St Michael's Church of England Primary (Voluntary Aided) School (Designation as having a Religious Character) Order 2006 (S.I. 2006/2941)
- Five Lanes CofE VC Primary School (Designation as having a Religious Character) Order 2006 (S.I. 2006/2942)
- Hope Hamilton CE Primary School (Designation as having a Religious Character) Order 2006 (S.I. 2006/2943)
- Immanuel CofE Community College (Designation as having a Religious Character) Order 2006 (S.I. 2006/2944)
- Leatherhead Trinity Primary School (Designation as having a Religious Character) Order 2006 (S.I. 2006/2945)
- Orchard Primary School (Designation as having a Religious Character) Order 2006 (S.I. 2006/2946)
- Our Lady of Walsingham Catholic Primary School (Designation as having a Religious Character) Order 2006 (S.I. 2006/2947)
- Sacred Heart RC Primary School (Designation as having a Religious Character) Order 2006 (S.I. 2006/2948)
- St Benedict's Catholic Primary School (Designation as having a Religious Character) Order 2006 (S.I. 2006/2949)
- Merchant Shipping (Prevention of Pollution by Sewage and Garbage) Order 2006 (S.I. 2006/2950)
- Transfer of Functions (Third Sector, Communities and Equality) Order 2006 (S.I. 2006/2951)
- Al-Qaida and Taliban (United Nations Measures) Order 2006 (S.I. 2006/2952)
- Victims and Survivors (Northern Ireland) Order 2006 (S.I. 2006/2953)
- Rates (Amendment) (Northern Ireland) Order 2006 (S.I. 2006/2954)
- Electricity Consents (Planning) (Northern Ireland) Order 2006 (S.I. 2006/2955)
- St Anne's RC Primary School (Designation as having a Religious Character) Order 2006 (S.I. 2006/2956)
- Smoking (Northern Ireland) Order 2006 (S.I. 2006/2957)
- North Korea (United Nations Measures) Order 2006 (S.I. 2006/2958)
- Outer Space Act 1986 (Bermuda) Order 2006 (S.I. 2006/2959)
- St Peter's Church of England Junior and Infant School (Designation as having a Religious Character) Order 2006 (S.I. 2006/2960)
- Seed Potatoes (Fees) (Wales) (No 2) Regulations 2006 (S.I. 2006/2961)
- Gambling Act 2005 (Commencement No. 4) Order 2006 (S.I. 2006/2964)
- Review of Polling Districts and Polling Places (Parliamentary Elections) Regulations 2006 (S.I. 2006/2965)
- Northern Ireland (Miscellaneous Provisions) Act 2006 (Commencement No.2) Order 2006 (S.I. 2006/2966)
- Housing Benefit and Council Tax Benefit (Amendment) (No. 2) Regulations 2006 (S.I. 2006/2967)
- Housing Benefit and Council Tax Benefit (Electronic Communications) Order 2006 (S.I. 2006/2968)
- Rice Products (Restriction on First Placing on the Market) (Wales) (Amendment) Regulations 2006 (S.I. 2006/2969)
- Shire Oak CofE Primary School (Designation as having a Religious Character) Order 2006 (S.I. 2006/2971)
- Encouraging Electoral Participation (Reimbursement of Expenses) (England and Wales) Regulations 2006 (S.I. 2006/2972)
- Absent Voting (Transitional Provisions) (England and Wales) Regulations 2006 (S.I. 2006/2973)
- Political Donations and Regulated Transactions (Anonymous Electors) (England and Wales) Regulations 2006 (S.I. 2006/2974)
- Financial Services and Markets Act 2000 (Markets in Financial Instruments) (Modification of Powers) Regulations 2006 (S.I. 2006/2975)
- St Teresa of Liseaux Catholic Infant School (Designation as having a Religious Character) Order 2006 (S.I. 2006/2977)
- Electricity Act 1989 (Exemption from the Requirement for a Generation Licence) (England and Wales) Order 2006 (S.I. 2006/2978)
- Smoke Control Areas (Authorised Fuels) (Wales) Regulations 2006 (S.I. 2006/2979)
- Smoke Control Areas (Exempted Fireplaces) (Wales) Order 2006 (S.I. 2006/2980)
- Specified Animal Pathogens (Amendment) (Wales) Order 2006 (S.I. 2006/2981)
- Plastic Materials and Articles in Contact with Food (Wales) Regulations 2006 (S.I. 2006/2982)
- Introductory Tenancies (Review of Decisions to Extend a Trial Period) (Wales) Regulations 2006 (S.I. 2006/2983)
- Medicines for Human Use (Clinical Trials) Amendment (No. 2) Regulations 2006 (S.I. 2006/2984)
- National Health Service (Pharmaceutical Services) (Amendment) (Wales) Regulations 2006 (S.I. 2006/2985)
- Children (Secure Accommodation) (Amendment) (Wales) Regulations 2006 (S.I. 2006/2986)
- Sheep and Goats (Records, Identification and Movement) (England) (Amendment) Order 2006 (S.I. 2006/2987)
- Radioactive Contaminated Land (Modification of Enactments) (Wales) Regulations 2006 (S.I. 2006/2988)
- Contaminated Land (Wales) Regulations 2006 (S.I. 2006/2989)
- Education and Inspections Act 2006 (Commencement No. 1 and Saving Provisions) Order 2006 (S.I. 2006/2990)
- Office for Standards in Education, Children's Services and Skills (Transitional Provisions) Regulations 2006 (S.I. 2006/2991)
- Natural Environment and Rural Communities Act 2006 (Commencement) (Wales) Order 2006 (S.I. 2006/2992)
- Regional Transport Planning (Wales) Order 2006 (S.I. 2006/2993)
- Wireless Telegraphy (Exemption) (Amendment) Regulations 2006 (S.I. 2006/2994)

== 3001–3100 ==
- Compensation Act 2006 (Commencement No. 1) Order 2006 (S.I. 2006/3005)
- Town and Country Planning (Environmental Impact Assessment) (Amendment) (Wales) Regulations 2006 (S.I. 2006/3009)
- Trade Marks (Amendment) Rules 2006 (S.I. 2006/3039)
- Employment Rights (Increase of Limits) Order 2006 (S.I. 2006/3045)
- A3 Trunk Road (Hindhead) Order 2006 (S.I. 2006/3076)
- A3 Trunk Road (Hindhead) Slip Roads Order 2006 (S.I. 2006/3077)
- A3 Trunk Road (Hindhead) Detrunking Order 2006 (S.I. 2006/3078)
- Pensions Act 2004 (Codes of Practice) (Member-nominated Trustees and Directors and Internal Controls) Appointed Day Order 2006 (S.I. 2006/3079)
- Occupational Pensions (Revaluation) Order 2006 (S.I. 2006/3086)
- National Health Service (Clinical Negligence Scheme) Amendment (No. 2) Regulations 2006 (S.I. 2006/3087)
- Social Security (Incapacity Benefit Work-focused Interviews) Amendment (No. 2) Regulations 2006 (S.I. 2006/3088)
- Petroleum Revenue Tax (Nomination Scheme for Disposals and Appropriations) (Amendment) Regulations 2006 (S.I. 2006/3089)
- Consumer Credit (Enforcement, Default and Termination Notices) (Amendment) Regulations 2006 (S.I. 2006/3094)
- Enterprise Act 2002 (Enforcement Undertakings) (No. 2) Order 2006 (S.I. 2006/3095)
- Local Authorities (Categorisation) (England) Order 2006 (S.I. 2006/3096)
- Education (Assisted Places) (Amendment) (Wales) Regulations 2006 (S.I. 2006/3097)
- Education (Assisted Places) (Incidental Expenses) (Amendment) (Wales) Regulations 2006 (S.I. 2006/3098)
- Town and Country Planning (Environmental Impact Assessment) (Amendment) (Wales) Regulations 2006 (S.I. 2006/3099)
- Independent Review of Determinations (Adoption) (Wales) Regulations 2006 (S.I. 2006/3100)

== 3101–3200 ==
- Common Agricultural Policy Single Payment Scheme (Set-aside) (Wales) (Amendment) Regulations 2006 (S.I. 2006/3101)
- Local Government (Best Value Authorities) (Power to Trade) (Amendment) (England) Order 2006 (S.I. 2006/3102)
- Inspection of the Careers and Related Services (Wales) Regulations 2006 (S.I. 2006/3103)
- Single European Sky (Functions of the National Supervisory Authority) Regulations 2006 (S.I. 2006/3104)
- Occupational Pension Schemes (Levy Ceiling — Earnings Percentage Increase) Order 2006 (S.I. 2006/3105)
- Environmental Impact Assessment (Forestry) (England and Wales) (Amendment) Regulations 2006 (S.I. 2006/3106)
- Banks (Former Authorised Institutions) (Insolvency) Order 2006 (S.I. 2006/3107)
- Healthy Start Scheme (Description of Healthy Start Food) (Wales) Regulations 2006 (S.I. 2006/3108)
- Borough of Kettering (Electoral Changes) Order 2006 (S.I. 2006/3109)
- City of Lincoln (Electoral Changes) Order 2006 (S.I. 2006/3110)
- District of South Northamptonshire (Electoral Changes) Order 2006 (S.I. 2006/3111)
- District of North Hertfordshire (Electoral Changes) Order 2006 (S.I. 2006/3112)
- Food for Particular Nutritional Uses (Addition of Substances for Specific Nutritional Purposes) (England) (Amendment) Regulations 2006 (S.I. 2006/3116)
- Network Rail (Thameslink 2000) Order 2006 (S.I. 2006/3117)
- Luton Dunstable Translink Order 2006 (S.I. 2006/3118)
- Planning and Compulsory Purchase Act 2004 (Commencement No.4 and Consequential, Transitional and Savings Provisions) (Wales) (Amendment No. 3) Order 2006 (S.I. 2006/3119)
- Feed (Specified Undesirable Substances) (England) Regulations 2006 (S.I. 2006/3120)
- Education (Recognised Awards) (Richmond The American International University in London) Order 2006 (S.I. 2006/3121)
- Teachers' Pensions etc. (Reform Amendments) Regulations 2006 (S.I. 2006/3122)
- National Health Service (Optical Charges and Payments) Amendment (No.2) Regulations 2006 (S.I. 2006/3123)
- Water Resources (Environmental Impact Assessment) (England and Wales) (Amendment) Regulations 2006 (S.I. 2006/3124)
- Health Act 2006 (Commencement No. 2) Order 2006 (S.I. 2006/3125)
- A449 and A456 Trunk Roads (Kidderminster, Blakedown and Hagley Bypass and Slip Roads) Order 1996 (Revocation) Order 2006 (S.I. 2006/3126)
- Civil Procedure (Amendment No.2) Rules 2006 (S.I. 2006/3132)
- Nationality, Immigration and Asylum Act 2002 (Commencement No. 12) Order 2006 (S.I. 2006/3144)
- Immigration (Certificate of Entitlement to Right of Abode in the United Kingdom) Regulations 2006 (S.I. 2006/3145)
- Transformational Grants Joint Scheme (Revocation) Order 2006 (S.I. 2006/3146)
- Newfield School (Change to School Session Times) Order 2006 (S.I. 2006/3147)
- Controlled Drugs (Supervision of Management and Use) Regulations 2006 (S.I. 2006/3148)
- Education (Local Education Authority Performance Targets) (England) (Amendment) Regulations 2006 (S.I. 2006/3150)
- Education (School Performance Targets) (England) (Amendment) Regulations 2006 (S.I. 2006/3151)
- War Pensions Committees (Amendment) Regulations 2006 (S.I. 2006/3152)
- Education (Student Support) (European Institutions) (No. 2) Regulations 2006 (S.I. 2006/3156)
- Customs and Excise Duties (Travellers' Allowances and Personal Reliefs) (New Member States) (Amendment) Order 2006 (S.I. 2006/3157)
- Relief for Legacies Imported from Third Countries (Application) Order 2006 (S.I. 2006/3158)
- Excise Duty Points (Etc.)(New Member States)(Amendment) Regulations 2006 (S.I. 2006/3159)
- Newark and Sherwood College (Dissolution) Order 2006 (S.I. 2006/3160)
- A1 Trunk Road (B1081 Junction Improvement Carpenter's Lodge) Order 2006 (S.I. 2006/3163)
- A1 Trunk Road (B1081 Junction Improvement Carpenter's Lodge) (Detrunking) Order 2006 (S.I. 2006/3164)
- National Park Authorities (England) Order 2006 (S.I. 2006/3165)
- Diseases of Animals (Approved Disinfectants) (Amendment) (Wales) Order 2006 (S.I. 2006/3166)
- Non-Domestic Rating Contributions (Amendment) (England) Regulations 2006 (S.I. 2006/3167)
- Safety of Sports Grounds (Designation) (No. 4) Order 2006 (S.I. 2006/3168)
- Radioactive Substances (Emergency Exemption) (England and Wales) Order 2006 (S.I. 2006/3169)
- Taxation of Chargeable Gains (Gilt-edged Securities) (No. 2) Order 2006 (S.I. 2006/3170)
- Education (School Teachers' Pay and Conditions) (No. 2) (Amendment) Order 2006 (S.I. 2006/3171)
- Social Security (Claims and Payments) Amendment (No. 2) Regulations 2006 (S.I. 2006/3188)
- Disability Rights Commission Act 1999 (Commencement No.3) Order 2006 (S.I. 2006/3189)
- Housing (Assessment of Accommodation Needs) (Meaning of Gypsies and Travellers) (England) Regulations 2006 (S.I. 2006/3190)
- Housing Act 2004 (Commencement No. 6)(England) Order 2006 (S.I. 2006/3191)
- Individual Savings Account (Amendment) Regulations 2006 (S.I. 2006/3194)
- Child Trust Funds (Amendment No. 3) Regulations 2006 (S.I. 2006/3195)
- School Staffing (England) (Amendment) (No. 2) Regulations 2006 (S.I. 2006/3197)
- Further Education (Providers of Education) (England) Regulations 2006 (S.I. 2006/3199)
- Fraud Act 2006 (Commencement) Order 2006 (S.I. 2006/3200)

== 3201–3300 ==
- National Lottery Act 2006 (Commencement No. 3) Order 2006 (S.I. 2006/3201)
- Big Lottery Fund (Prescribed Expenditure) Order 2006 (S.I. 2006/3202)
- Road Traffic (Permitted Parking Area and Special Parking Area) (City of Leicester) Order 2006 (S.I. 2006/3211)
- Bus Lane Contraventions (Approved Local Authorities) (England) (Amendment) (No. 6) Order 2006 (S.I. 2006/3212)
- European Communities (Recognition of Professional Qualifications) (Second General System) (Amendment) Regulations 2006 (S.I. 2006/3214)
- Asylum (Designated States) (Amendment) Order 2006 (S.I. 2006/3215)
- Statistics of Trade (Customs and Excise) (Amendment) Regulations 2006 (S.I. 2006/3216)
- Criminal Justice Act 2003 (Commencement No.14 and Transitional Provision) Order 2006 (S.I. 2006/3217)
- Group Relief for Overseas Losses (Modification of the Corporation Tax Acts for Non-resident Insurance Companies) Regulations 2006 (S.I. 2006/3218)
- Gambling Act 2005 (Commencement No. 5) Order 2006 (S.I. 2006/3220)
- Capital Requirements Regulations 2006 (S.I. 2006/3221)
- Real Estate Investment Trusts (Assessment and Recovery of Tax) (Amendment) Regulations 2006 (S.I. 2006/3222)
- Merchant Shipping (Inland Waterway and Limited Coastal Operations) (Boatmasters' Qualifications and Hours of Work) Regulations 2006 (S.I. 2006/3223)
- Merchant Shipping (Local Passenger Vessels) (Crew) Regulations 2006 (S.I. 2006/3224)
- Merchant Shipping (Fees) (Amendment) Regulations 2006 (S.I. 2006/3225)
- Education (Pupil Referral Units) (Application of Enactments) (England) (Amendment) (No. 2) Regulations 2006 (S.I. 2006/3226)
- Town and Country Planning (Costs of Independent Examinations) (Standard Daily Amount) (England) Regulations 2006 (S.I. 2006/3227)
- Excise Duties (Road Fuel Gas) (Reliefs) (Revocation) Regulations 2006 (S.I. 2006/3234)
- Excise Duties (Surcharges or Rebates) (Hydrocarbon Oils etc.) (Revocation) Order 2006 (S.I. 2006/3235)
- Loan Relationships and Derivative Contracts (Disregard and Bringing into Account of Profits and Losses) (Amendment) Regulations 2006 (S.I. 2006/3236)
- Stamp Duty Land Tax (Variation of the Finance Act 2003) Regulations 2006 (S.I. 2006/3237)
- Loan Relationships and Derivative Contracts (Change of Accounting Practice) (Amendment) Regulations 2006 (S.I. 2006/3238)
- Authorised Investment Funds (Tax) (Amendment) Regulations 2006 (S.I. 2006/3239)
- Finance Act 2004, Section 77(1) and (7), (Appointed Day) Order 2006 (S.I. 2006/3240)
- Income Tax (Indexation) (No. 2) Order 2006 (S.I. 2006/3241)
- Housing (Right to Buy) (Priority of Charges) (England) (No. 3) Order 2006 (S.I. 2006/3242)
- Armed Forces (Entry, Search and Seizure) Order 2006 (S.I. 2006/3243)
- Armed Forces (Entry, Search and Seizure) (Amendment) Order 2006 (S.I. 2006/3244)
- Severn Bridges Tolls Order 2006 (S.I. 2006/3246)
- Avian Influenza (H5N1 in Poultry) (England) Order 2006 (S.I. 2006/3247)
- Scotland Act 1998 (Agency Arrangements) (Specification) (No. 2) Order 2006 (S.I. 2006/3248)
- Avian Influenza (H5N1 in Wild Birds) (England) Order 2006 (S.I. 2006/3249)
- Cereal Seed (Wales) and Fodder Plant Seed (Wales) (Amendment) Regulations 2006 (S.I. 2006/3250)
- Care Standards Act 2000 and the Children Act 1989 (Regulatory Reform and Complaints) (Wales) Regulations 2006 (S.I. 2006/3251)
- Registration of Political Parties (Prohibited Words and Expressions) (Amendment) Order 2006 (S.I. 2006/3252)
- Common Agricultural Policy Single Payment and Support Schemes (Cross-compliance) (England) (Amendment) Regulations 2006 (S.I. 2006/3254)
- Veterinary Surgeons and Veterinary Practitioners (Registration) (Amendment) Regulations Order of Council 2006 (S.I. 2006/3255)
- Countryside and Rights of Way Act 2000 (Commencement No. 9 and Saving) (Wales) Order 2006 (S.I. 2006/3257)
- Scotland Act 1998 (Transfer of Functions to the Scottish Ministers etc.) (No. 3) Order 2006 (S.I. 2006/3258)
- Compensation Act 2006 (Contribution for Mesothelioma Claims) Regulations 2006 (S.I. 2006/3259)
- Welfare of Animals (Transport) (England) Order 2006 (S.I. 2006/3260)
- Registered Pension Schemes (Enhanced Lifetime Allowance) (Amendment) Regulations 2006 (S.I. 2006/3261)
- Lloyd's Underwriters (Double Taxation Relief) (Corporate Members) Regulations 2006 (S.I. 2006/3262)
- Northern Ireland (Miscellaneous Provisions) Act 2006 (Commencement No. 3) Order 2006 (S.I. 2006/3263)
- Medicines (Pharmacies) (Applications for Registration and Fees) Amendment Regulations 2006 (S.I. 2006/3264)
- Finance Act 2006, Section 53(2) (Films and Sound Recordings: Power to alter Dates) Order 2006 (S.I. 2006/3265)
- Gambling Act 2005 (Definition of Small-scale Operator) Regulations 2006 (S.I. 2006/3266)
- Gambling (Personal Licences) (Modification of Part 5 of the Gambling Act 2005) Regulations 2006 (S.I. 2006/3267)
- Finance Act 2002, Schedule 26, (Parts 2 and 9) (Amendment) Order 2006 (S.I. 2006/3269)
- Insurance Companies (Corporation Tax Acts) (Miscellaneous Amendments) Order 2006 (S.I. 2006/3270)
- Overseas Life Insurance Companies Regulations 2006 (S.I. 2006/3271)
- Gambling Act 2005 (Commencement No. 6 and Transitional Provisions) Order 2006 (S.I. 2006/3272)
- Lloyd's Sourcebook (Finance Act 1993 and Finance Act 1994) (Amendment) Order 2006 (S.I. 2006/3273)
- Social Security (Miscellaneous Amendments) (No. 5) Regulations 2006 (S.I. 2006/3274)
- Asylum (Designated States) (Amendment) (No. 2) Order 2006 (S.I. 2006/3275)
- Passenger and Goods Vehicles (Community Recording Equipment Regulation) Regulations 2006 (S.I. 2006/3276)
- Immigration (Designation of Travel Bans) (Amendment) Order 2006 (S.I. 2006/3277)
- Representation of the People (Combination of Polls) (England and Wales) (Amendment) Regulations 2006 3278)
- Wear Valley (Parishes) Order 2006 (S.I. 2006/3279)
- Torbay (Parish) Order 2006 (S.I. 2006/3280)
- Films (Certification) Regulations 2006 (S.I. 2006/3281)
- Structural Funds (National Assembly for Wales) Regulations 2006 (S.I. 2006/3282)
- Mutual Assistance Provisions Order 2006 (S.I. 2006/3283)
- Gambling (Operating Licence and Single-Machine Permit Fees) Regulations 2006 (S.I. 2006/3284)
- Gambling (Personal Licence Fees) Regulations 2006 (S.I. 2006/3285)
- Reporting of Savings Income Information (Amendment) Regulations 2006 (S.I. 2006/3286)
- Gambling Appeals Tribunal Fees Regulations 2006 (S.I. 2006/3287)
- Exemption from Income Tax for Certain Interest and Royalty Payments (Amendment of Section 757(2) of the Income Tax (Trading and Other Income) Act 2005) Order 2006 (S.I. 2006/3288)
- Waste Electrical and Electronic Equipment Regulations 2006 (S.I. 2006/3289)
- Rehabilitation of Offenders Act 1974 (Exceptions) (Amendment No. 2) (England and Wales) Order 2006 (S.I. 2006/3290)
- Capital Gains Tax (Definition of Permanent Interest Bearing Share) Regulations 2006 (S.I. 2006/3291)
- Value Added Tax (Amendment) (No. 3) Regulations 2006 (S.I. 2006/3292)
- Gambling Appeals Tribunal Rules 2006 (S.I. 2006/3293)
- Public Lending Right Scheme 1982 (Commencement of Variation) Order 2006 (S.I. 2006/3294)
- Town and Country Planning (Environmental Impact Assessment) (Amendment) Regulations 2006 (S.I. 2006/3295)
- Taxation of Securitisation Companies Regulations 2006 (S.I. 2006/3296)
- Textile Products (Indications of Fibre Content) (Amendment and Consolidation of Schedules of Textile Names and Allowances) Regulations 2006 (S.I. 2006/3297)
- Textile Products (Determination of Composition) Regulations 2006 (S.I. 2006/3298)
- A1 Trunk Road (Bramham to Wetherby Upgrading)(River Wharfe Bridge) Order 2006 (S.I. 2006/3300)

== 3301–3400 ==
- A1 (Motorway) (Bramham Crossroads to Kirk Deighton Junction and Connecting Roads) Scheme 2006 (S.I. 2006/3301)
- A1 Trunk Road (Bramham to Wetherby Upgrading) (Detrunking) Order 2006 (S.I. 2006/3302)
- Civil Aviation (Provision of Information to Passengers) Regulations 2006 (S.I. 2006/3303)
- Local Elections (Principal Areas) (England and Wales) Rules 2006 (S.I. 2006/3304)
- Local Elections (Parishes and Communities) (England and Wales) Rules 2006 (S.I. 2006/3305)
- National Health Service (Charges to Overseas Visitors) (Amendment) Regulations 2006 (S.I. 2006/3306)
- Avian Influenza (H5N1 in Poultry) (Wales) Order 2006 (S.I. 2006/3309)
- Avian Influenza (H5N1 in Wild Birds) (Wales) Order 2006 (S.I. 2006/3310)
- Controls on Dangerous Substances and Preparations Regulations 2006 (S.I. 2006/3311)
- Petroleum Revenue Tax (Attribution of Blended Crude Oil) Regulations 2006 (S.I. 2006/3312)
- Oil Taxation (Market Value of Oil) Regulations 2006 (S.I. 2006/3313)
- Flexible Working (Eligibility, Complaints and Remedies) (Amendment) Regulations 2006 (S.I. 2006/3314)
- Waste Electrical and Electronic Equipment (Waste Management Licensing) (England and Wales) Regulations 2006 (S.I. 2006/3315)
- Planning (Listed Buildings and Conservation Areas) (Amendment) (Wales) Regulations 2006 (S.I. 2006/3316)
- Accession (Immigration and Worker Authorisation) Regulations 2006 (S.I. 2006/3317)
- Building and Approved Inspectors (Amendment) (No. 2) Regulations 2006 (S.I. 2006/3318)
- Compensation (Regulated Claims Management Services) Order 2006 (S.I. 2006/3319)
- Town and Country Planning (Regional Spatial Strategies) (Examinations in Public) (Remuneration and Allowances) (England) (Revocation) Regulations 2006 (S.I. 2006/3320)
- Compensation (Specification of Benefits) Order 2006 (S.I. 2006/3321)
- Compensation (Claims Management Services) Regulations 2006 (S.I. 2006/3322)
- Wireless Telegraphy (Jersey) Order 2006 (S.I. 2006/3324)
- Wireless Telegraphy (Guernsey) Order 2006 (S.I. 2006/3325)
- United Nations (International Tribunals) (Former Yugoslavia and Rwanda) (Amendment) (No. 2) Order 2006 (S.I. 2006/3326)
- North Korea (United Nations Measures) (Overseas Territories) Order 2006 (S.I. 2006/3327)
- Parliamentary Commissioner Order 2006 (S.I. 2006/3328)
- European Communities (Designation) (Amendment) Order 2006 (S.I. 2006/3329)
- Local Authorities (Armorial Bearings) Order 2006 (S.I. 2006/3330)
- Misuse of Drugs Act 1971 (Amendment) Order 2006 (S.I. 2006/3331)
- Health Service Commissioner for England (Special Health Authorities) (Revocation) Order 2006 (S.I. 2006/3332)
- Association of Law Costs Draftsmen Order 2006 (S.I. 2006/3333)
- National Assembly for Wales (Transfer of Functions) (No. 2) Order 2006 (S.I. 2006/3334)
- National Assembly for Wales (Disqualification) Order 2006 (S.I. 2006/3335)
- Water and Sewerage Services (Northern Ireland) Order 2006 (S.I. 2006/3336)
- Housing (Amendment) (Northern Ireland) Order 2006 (S.I. 2006/3337)
- Scotland Act 1998 (Agency Arrangements) (Specification) (No. 3) Order 2006 (S.I. 2006/3338)
- Local Government Act 2003 (Commencement No. 1 and Savings) (Wales) Order 2006 (S.I. 2006/3339)
- Allocation of Housing and Homelessness (Eligibility) (England) (Amendment) (No. 2) Regulations 2006 (S.I. 2006/3340)
- Social Security (Bulgaria and Romania) Amendment Regulations 2006 (S.I. 2006/3341)
- Agricultural Subsidies and Grants Schemes (Appeals) (Wales) Regulations 2006 (S.I. 2006/3342)
- Rural Development Programmes (Wales) Regulations 2006 (S.I. 2006/3343)
- Fishery Products (Official Controls Charges) (Wales) Regulations 2006 (S.I. 2006/3344)
- Non-Domestic Rating (Small Business Relief) (Wales) Order 2006 (S.I. 2006/3345)
- Education (Special Educational Needs) (England) (Consolidation) (Amendment) Regulations 2006 (S.I. 2006/3346)
- Non-Domestic Rating Contributions (Wales) (Amendment) Regulations 2006 (S.I. 2006/3347)
- Childcare Act 2006 (Commencement No. 1) Order 2006 (S.I. 2006/3360)
- Gambling Act 2005 (Commencement No. 6 and Transitional Provisions) (Amendment) Order 2006 (S.I. 2006/3361)
- Legal Services Ombudsman (Jurisdiction) (Amendment) Order 2006 (S.I. 2006/3362)
- Enterprise Act 2002 (Amendment) Regulations 2006 (S.I. 2006/3363)
- Police and Justice Act 2006 (Commencement No. 1, Transitional and Saving Provisions) Order 2006 (S.I. 2006/3364)
- Police and Justice Act 2006 (Supplementary and Transitional Provisions) Order 2006 (S.I. 2006/3365)
- National Health Service (Dental Charges) (Wales) (Amendment) Regulations 2006 (S.I. 2006/3366)
- Olive Oil (Marketing Standards) (Amendment) Regulations 2006 (S.I. 2006/3367)
- Smoke-free (Premises and Enforcement) Regulations 2006 (S.I. 2006/3368)
- Tax Credits Act 2002 (Commencement and Transitional Provisions) Order 2006 (S.I. 2006/3369)
- Financial Assistance Scheme (Miscellaneous Amendments) Regulations 2006 (S.I. 2006/3370)
- Enterprise Act 2002 (Part 8 Notice to OFT of Intended Prosecution Specified Enactments) Order 2006 (S.I. 2006/3371)
- Enterprise Act 2002 (Part 8 Notice to OFT of Intended Prosecution Specified Enactments) Order 2006 (S.I. 2006/3372)
- National Health Service (Pharmaceutical Services) (Amendment) Regulations 2006 (S.I. 2006/3373)
- Superannuation (Admission to Schedule 1 to the Superannuation Act 1972) Order 2006 (S.I. 2006/3374)
- M4 Motorway (Junction 30 (Pentwyn) Slip Roads) (Trunking) Scheme 2006 (S.I. 2006/3383)
- Financial Services and Markets Act 2000 (Regulated Activities) (Amendment No. 3) Order 2006 (S.I. 2006/3384)
- Financial Services and Markets Act 2000 (EEA Passport Rights) (Amendment) Regulations 2006 (S.I. 2006/3385)
- Financial Services and Markets Act 2000 (Recognition Requirements for Investment Exchanges and Clearing Houses) (Amendment) Regulations 2006 (S.I. 2006/3386)
- Insurance Companies (Corporation Tax Acts) (Amendment No. 2) Order 2006 (S.I. 2006/3387)
- Personal Injuries (NHS Charges) (General) and Road Traffic (NHS Charges) (Amendment) Regulations 2006 (S.I. 2006/3388)
- Group Relief for Overseas Losses (Modification of the Corporation Tax Acts for Non-resident Insurance Companies) (No. 2) Regulations 2006 (S.I. 2006/3389)
- Town and Country Planning (General Development Procedure) (Amendment) (Wales) Order 2006 (S.I. 2006/3390)
- Gambling Act 2005 (Relevant Offences) (Amendment) Order 2006 (S.I. 2006/3391)
- Non-Domestic Rating (Demand Notices and Discretionary Relief) (Wales) (Amendment) Regulations 2006 (S.I. 2006/3392)
- Asylum (First List of Safe Countries) (Amendment) Order 2006 (S.I. 2006/3393)
- Non-Domestic Rating (Chargeable Amounts) (Amendment) (England) Regulations 2006 (S.I. 2006/3394)
- Council Tax and Non-Domestic Rating (Amendment) (England) Regulations 2006 (S.I. 2006/3395)
- Council Tax (Discount Disregards) (Amendment) (England) Order 2006 (S.I. 2006/3396)
- Health and Social Care (Community Health and Standards) Act 2003 (Commencement) (No. 11) Order 2006 (S.I. 2006/3397)
- Personal Injuries (NHS Charges) (Reviews and Appeals) and Road Traffic (NHS Charges) (Reviews and Appeals) (Amendment) Regulations 2006 (S.I. 2006/3398)
- Finance Act 2006, Section 53(1) (Films and Sound Recordings) (Appointed Day) Order 2006 (S.I. 2006/3399)
- Education and Inspections Act 2006 (Commencement No. 2) Order 2006 (S.I. 2006/3400)

== 3401–3500 ==
- Assistants to Justices' Clerks Regulations 2006 (S.I. 2006/3405)
- Service Voters' Registration Period Order 2006 (S.I. 2006/3406)
- Animal Health and Welfare (Scotland) Act 2006 (Consequential Provisions) (England and Wales) Order 2006 (S.I. 2006/3407)
- Education (Aptitude for Particular Subjects) (Amendment) (England) Regulations 2006 (S.I. 2006/3408)
- Education (Infant Class Sizes) (England) (Amendment) Regulations 2006 (S.I. 2006/3409)
- Private Security Industry (Licences) (Amendment) Regulations 2006 (S.I. 2006/3410)
- Private Security Industry Act 2001 (Duration of Licence) (No. 2) Order 2006 (S.I. 2006/3411)
- Electoral Administration Act 2006 (Commencement No. 2, Transitional and Savings Provisions) Order 2006 (S.I. 2006/3412)
- Financial Services and Markets Act 2000 (Disclosure of Confidential Information) (Amendment) Regulations 2006 (S.I. 2006/3413)
- Financial Services and Markets Act 2000 (Appointed Representatives) (Amendment) Regulations 2006 (S.I. 2006/3414)
- Police Pensions Regulations S.I. 2006/3415)
- Political Parties, Elections and Referendums Act 2000 (Commencement No. 3 and Transitional Provisions) Order 2006 (S.I. 2006/3416)
- Bradford (Parishes) (No. 2) Order 2006 (S.I. 2006/3417)
- Electromagnetic Compatibility Regulations 2006 (S.I. 2006/3418)
- Bus Lane Contraventions (Approved Local Authorities) (England) (Amendment) (No. 8) Order 2006 (S.I. 2006/3419)
- Road Traffic (Permitted Parking Area and Special Parking Area) (City of Wolverhampton) Order 2006 (S.I. 2006/3420)
- Road Traffic (Permitted Parking Area and Special Parking Area) (Borough of Warrington) Order 2006 (S.I. 2006/3421)
- Criminal Justice Act 2003 (Commencement No.15) Order 2006 (S.I. 2006/3422)
- Domestic Violence, Crime and Victims Act 2004 (Commencement No. 7 and Transitional Provision) Order 2006 (S.I. 2006/3423)
- Road Traffic (Permitted Parking Area and Special Parking Area) (Metropolitan Borough of South Tyneside) Order 2006 (S.I. 2006/3424)
- Bus Lane Contraventions (Approved Local Authorities) (England) (Amendment) (No. 7) Order 2006 (S.I. 2006/3425)
- Hydrocarbon Oil Duties (Sulphur–free Diesel) (Hydrogenation of Biomass) (Reliefs) Regulations 2006 (S.I. 2006/3426)
- Stamp Duty Land Tax (Electronic Communications) (Amendment) Regulations 2006 (S.I. 2006/3427)
- Companies Act 2006 (Commencement No. 1, Transitional Provisions and Savings) Order 2006 (S.I. 2006/3428)
- Companies (Registrar, Languages and Trading Disclosures) Regulations 2006 (S.I. 2006/3429)
- Films (Definition of "British Film") (No. 2) Order 2006 (S.I. 2006/3430)
- Firefighters' Pension Scheme (England) Order 2006 (S.I. 2006/3432)
- Civil Procedure (Amendment No.3) Rules 2006 (S.I. 2006/3435)
- Police (Amendment) (No. 2) Regulations 2006 (S.I. 2006/3449)
- King's Lynn and West Norfolk (Parishes) Order 2006 (S.I. 2006/3450)
- Extradition Act 2003 (Amendment to Designations) Order 2006 (S.I. 2006/3451)
- Animals and Animal Products (Import and Export) (Wales) (Amendment) (No. 2) Regulations 2006 (S.I. 2006/3452)
- A65 Trunk Road (Gargrave Bypass) Order 1990, as varied by the A65 Trunk Road (Gargrave Bypass) Order 1990 Amendment and New Trunk Road Order 1993 (Revocation) Order 2006 (S.I. 2006/3465)
- A65 Trunk Road (Hellifield and Long Preston Bypass and Slip Roads) Order 1993 (Revocation) Order 2006 (S.I. 2006/3466)
- Castle Point (Parish) Order 2006 (S.I. 2006/3467)
- Wealden (Parishes) Order 2006 (S.I. 2006/3468)
- Hinckley and Bosworth (Parish) Order 2006 (S.I. 2006/3469)
- Rugby (Parishes) Order 2006 (S.I. 2006/3470)
- Network Rail (West Coast Main Line) (Stowe Hill) Order 2006 (S.I. 2006/3471)
- Official Controls (Animals, Feed and Food) (England) Regulations 2006 (S.I. 2006/3472)
- Mental Capacity Act 2005 (Commencement No.1) (Amendment) Order 2006 (S.I. 2006/3473)
- Mental Capacity Act 2005 (Appropriate Body) (England) (Amendment) Regulations 2006 (S.I. 2006/3475)

== 3501–3600 ==
- General Osteopathic Council (Continuing Professional Development) Rules Order of Council 2006 (S.I. 2006/3511)

== See also ==
- List of statutory instruments of the United Kingdom
