= Anti-social Behaviour Act 2003 =

Act of the Parliament of the United Kingdom

Anti-social Behaviour Act 2003 (Note: Section 97.)
- Act of Parliament
- Parliament of the United Kingdom
- Long title: An Act to make provision in connection with anti-social behaviour.
- Citation: 2003 c. 38
- Introduced by: David Blunkett (Commons); Baroness Scotland QC (Lords)
- Territorial extent: England and Wales; Northern Ireland (in part); (Note: Section 96.)

Dates
- Royal assent: 20 November 2003
- Commencement: Various (Note: Section 93.)

Other legislation
- Amends: Firearms Act 1968; Football Spectators Act 1989; Firearms (Amendment) Act 1988; Town and Country Planning Act 1990; Education Act 1996
- Amended by: Education Act 2005; Serious Organised Crime and Police Act 2005; Clean Neighbourhoods and Environment Act 2005; Drugs Act 2005; Violent Crime Reduction Act 2006; Education and Inspections Act 2006; Police and Justice Act 2006; Criminal Justice and Immigration Act 2008; Education and Skills Act 2008; Education Act 2011; Legal Aid, Sentencing and Punishment of Offenders Act 2012; Crime and Courts Act 2013; Anti-social Behaviour, Crime and Policing Act 2014; Policing and Crime Act 2017; Curriculum and Assessment (Wales) Act 2021; Renters' Rights Act 2025
- Relates to: Local Government Act 1972; Housing Act 1995; Noise Act 1996; Housing Act 1996; Crime and Disorder Act 1998; Powers of Criminal Courts (Sentencing) Act 2000; Police Reform Act 2002; Criminal Justice and Immigration Act 2008; Anti-social Behaviour, Crime and Policing Act 2014

Status: Partially repealed

Text of statute as originally enacted

Revised text of statute as amended

The Anti-social Behaviour Act 2003 (c. 38) is an act of the Parliament of the United Kingdom which almost entirely applies only to England and Wales.

== Provisions ==
The act, championed by then Home Secretary, David Blunkett, was passed in 2003. As well as strengthening the anti-social behaviour order and Fixed Penalty Notice provisions, and banning spray paint sales to people under the age of 16, it gives local councils the power to order the removal of graffiti from private property.

It also specifically addressed truancy, drug houses, false reports of emergency, fireworks, public drunkenness and gang activity.

=== Class A drug, supply, distribution or production premises closure orders ===
Until October 2014, Part I of the Act ("Premises where drugs used unlawfully") enabled the police to close residential premises concerned in the use, production or supply of Class A drugs and which were associated with serious nuisance or disorder to members of the public in the preceding three months. After such a notice had been served, within 48 hours a magistrates' court had to consider the application, and could make a closure order under Section 2, known as a "Class A drug, supply, distribution or production premises closure Order". The effect of such an order was that no-one could lawfully enter the premises whilst the order was in place, and it became a criminal offence to do so.

=== Antisocial behaviour closure orders ===
Between December 2008 and October 2014, Part 1A of the Act ("Premises associated with persistent disorder or nuisance") created the Part 1A closure order or antisocial behaviour closure order. Sections 11A-11L of the 2003 Act permitted the police or local authority to apply to magistrates to close premises where they were satisfied that within the preceding three months the premises had been associated with "significant and persistent disorder or persistent serious nuisance to members of the public." The order could be made in respect of business or residential premises. Similar to the Part 1 Order (Crack house closure order), it became an offence to remain in or re-enter the premises for the duration of the order.

Parts 1 and 1A were repealed on 20 October 2014 by Anti-social Behaviour, Crime and Policing Act 2014 Sch.11(1) para 41(a).

=== Antisocial behaviour injunctions (ASBIs) ===
Part II ("Housing") amended housing legislation to require social housing organisations to adopt and publish policies on anti-social behaviour. It also strengthened the power of registered social landlords (RSLs) to take action against tenants who cause nuisance or annoyance to neighbours. One power was that secure tenancies could be 'demoted' by order of the County Court, which in theory at least, made eviction easier. A further important provision provided a mechanism for RSLs to apply for injunctions against people causing nuisance and annoyance to people in the neighbourhood of their housing stock. Section 13 of the 2003 Act amended Part V of the Housing Act 1996 ('Conduct of Tenants'), by repealing Sections 152 and 153, and inserting new Sections 153A - 153E. Where a person was invited into residential premises by the occupier, in breach of an s.153A injunction, they committed an offence.

Section 153A of the Housing Act 1996 was repealed in March 2015.

=== Parenting orders ===
Part III ("Parental responsibilities") amends 'parenting orders', which were introduced by the Crime and Disorder Act 1998. These are intended to specify steps parents must take to control their children. It also introduces 'parenting contracts', which are mainly intended to cover child truancy.

=== Dispersal zones ===
Between January 2004 and October 2014, Part IV ("Dispersal of groups etc.") gave the police powers to disperse groups of two or more persons in any public place if their presence "has resulted, or is likely to result, in any members of the public being intimidated, harassed, alarmed or distressed". There was also a power for a police officer (or PCSO) to accompany any unaccompanied person of under 16 to their home between the hours of 9 pm and 6 am. Section 30 did not apply to lawful pickets, although the human rights implications had been considered by the courts on a number of occasions. The power for police to remove a child under s30 was permissive, not coercive.

Part IV was repealed in October 2014 by Sch.11(1) para 41(c) of the Anti-social Behaviour, Crime and Policing Act 2014.

=== Firearms ===
Part V ("Firearms") amends the Firearms Act 1968 to make possession of an airgun or an imitation weapon in public an offence. The sale of imitation firearms was further limited by section 36 of the Violent Crime Reduction Act 2006 (VCRA) which made sale of realistic imitation firearms (RIFs) an offence. Various groups of people who legitimately use RIFs, for work or pleasure, can provide a seller with a defence against prosecution as provided for in section 37 of the VCRA. These groups are set out in regulations made by the Secretary of State, and can be changed at any time.

=== The environment ===
Part VI ("The Environment") contains a selection of miscellaneous provisions. It gives councils power to serve a closure order on premises causing public nuisance by noise. Councils also now have the power to serve a graffiti removal notice on the person in control (usually the owner) of any surface that is street furniture (such as a telephone box, post box or bus stop) where graffiti has been applied, this legislation does not apply to private property. There is a right of appeal to the magistrates court over such a notice, and one ground for appeal is that 'the defacement is neither detrimental to the amenity of the area nor offensive'. It makes the sale of aerosol paint to any person under 16 illegal.

=== Raves and travellers ===
Part VII ("Public Order and Trespass") amends the Criminal Justice and Public Order Act 1994 in two main ways. First, the definition of a 'rave' is amended so that only 20 people, rather than 100 must be present. Second the powers of police to move unauthorised travellers' sites are strengthened. This Part also amends the provisions of the Public Order Act 1986 concerning public assemblies. The earlier Act gave the police power to intervene if a public assembly of 20 or more people appeared likely to cause 'serious public disorder, serious damage to property or serious disruption to the life of the community'. This Act reduces the number to two.

=== High hedges ===
Part VIII ("High Hedges") is in response to concerns about hedges, typically of Leyland Cypress plants, which can grow to 6 metres or more in height, sometimes cutting out light for neighbours. Such hedges are not controlled by town planning legislation (which normally limits the height of fences to 2 metres), and so there was formerly no way of preventing people from allowing such a hedge to grow. This part of the Act gives local authorities the power to investigate complaints made by people affected by such hedges, and, if necessary, to require their reduction. Councils can charge a fee for dealing with such complaints. Soon after implementation, some councils were charging no fee, while the highest in the country was Sevenoaks, which charged £650.

=== Miscellaneous ===
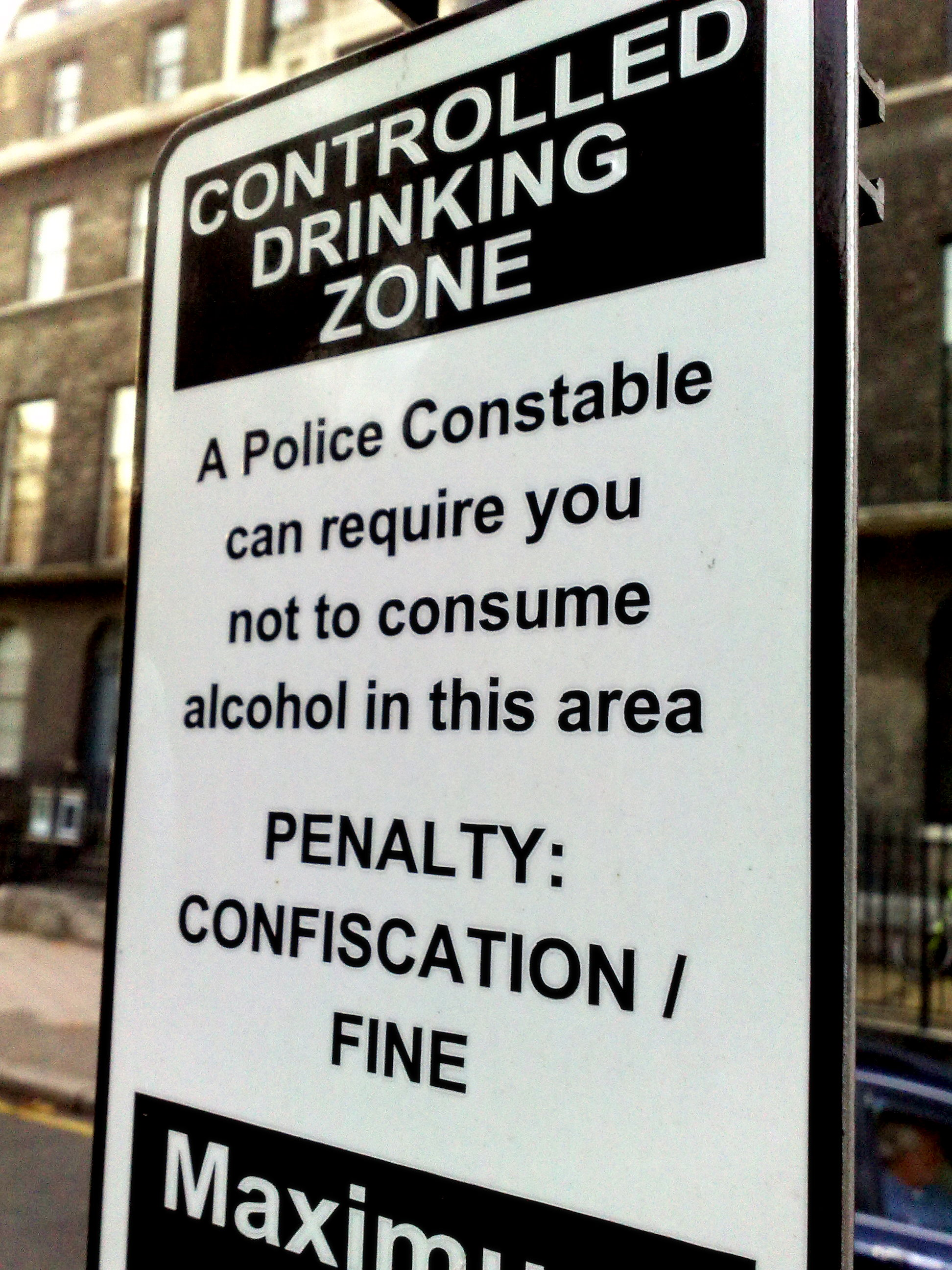
Designated Public Place, Camden, London

Part IX ("Miscellaneous") makes some changes to the mechanisms for serving and enforcing anti-social behaviour orders. Section 89 extended the powers of Police Community Support Officers (PCSOs). The main changes are that PCSOs have the power to stop a cyclist, and accredited support officers or rail community officers can issue FPNs in respect of a number of offences:

- Use of insulting or abusive behaviour to cause harassment alarm or distress
- Throwing fireworks in a thoroughfare
- Trespassing on a railway
- Throwing stones etc. at trains or other things on railways
- Buying or attempting to buy alcohol for consumption in a bar in licensed premises by a person under 18
- Knowingly giving a false alarm to the fire brigade
- Wasting police time or giving a false report
- Consumption of alcohol in a designated public place
- Using a public communications system for sending messages known to be false in order to cause annoyance

== Extent ==
- Part X ("General") limits the extent of the legislation to England and Wales only, apart from Part V.

== See also ==
- Anti-social behaviour order
- Broken windows theory
- Graffiti abatement

== Bibliography ==
- Ashworth, Andrew (2007), "Public Order: Anti-social Behaviour Act 2003 s 30", Criminal Law Review: 243–246
- Flint, John; Nixon, Judy (2006), "Governing neighbours: Anti-social behaviour orders and new forms of regulating conduct in the UK", Urban Studies, 43 (5): 939–955, Bibcode:2006UrbSt..43..939F, doi:10.1080/00420980600676386
- Greatorex & Falkowski (2006), Anti-Social Behaviour Law, Bristol: Jordans, ISBN 978-1-84661-002-8
- Ormerod, David; Hooper, Rt Hon Lord Justice (2009), Blackstone's Criminal Practice 2010, Oxford: Oxford University Press, ISBN 978-0-19-957424-7
- Sikand, Maya (2006), ASBOs: A Practitioner's Guide to Defending Anti-social Behaviour Orders, London: Legal Action Group, ISBN 978-1-903307-41-0
- Sikand, Maya (2009), Blackstone's Guide to the Criminal Justice and Immigration Act 2008, Oxford: Oxford University Press, ISBN 978-0-19-955382-2
