= Drinking in public =

Social customs and laws concerning drinking alcohol in public

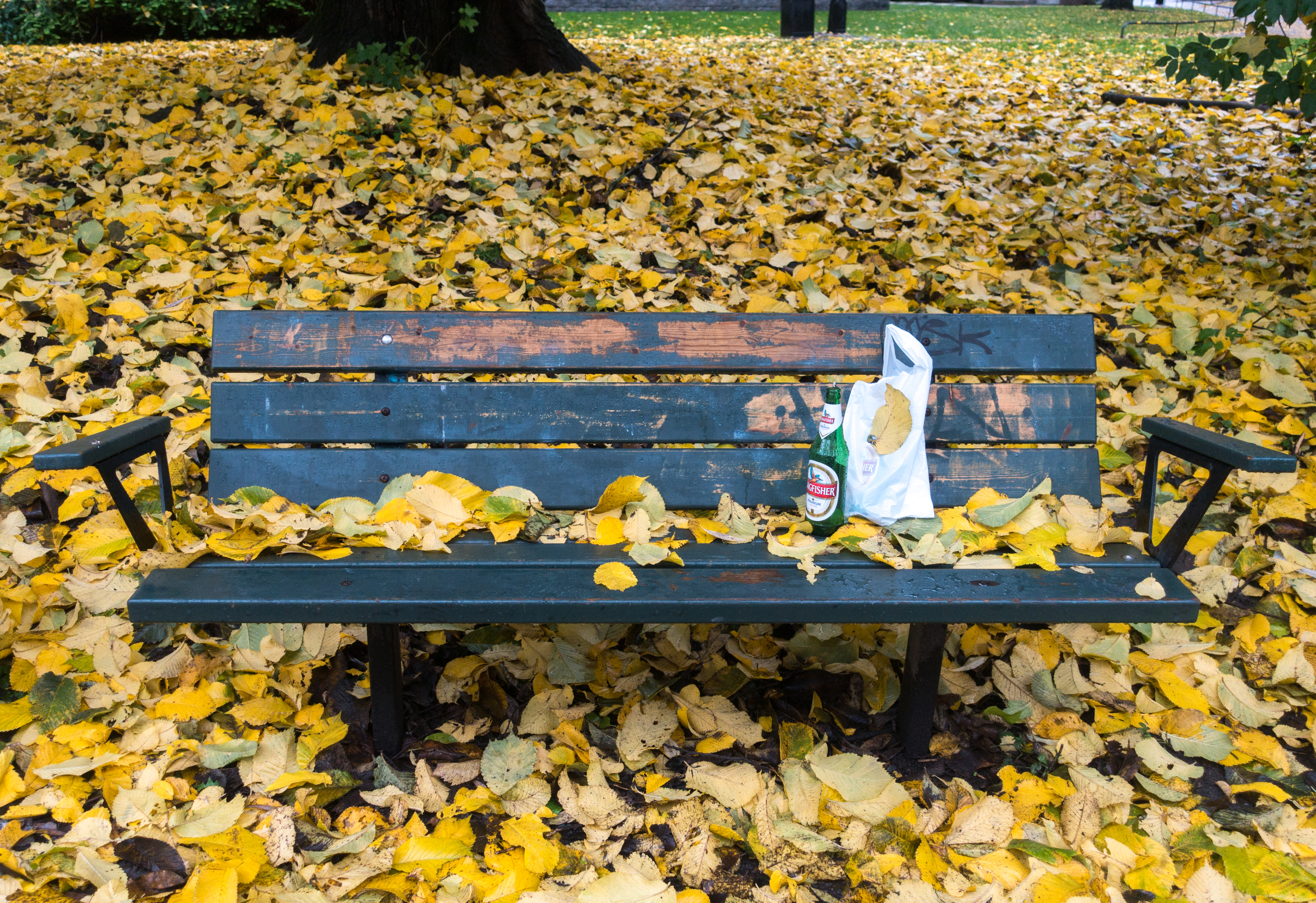
Beer bottles on a park bench in Stockholm

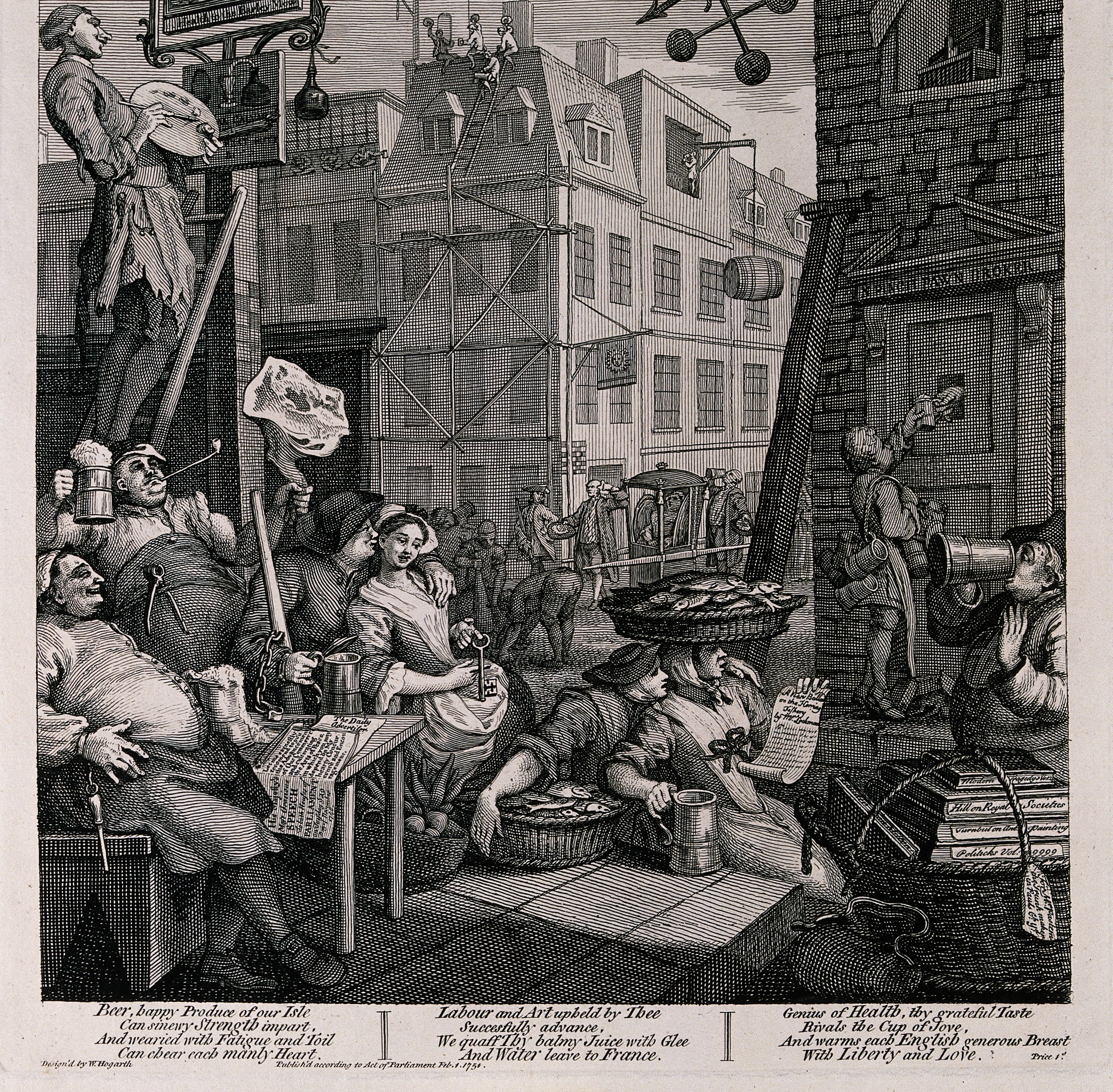
Engraving of a street scene by William Hogarth, c. 1751, showing traders consuming beer in public

Social customs and laws concerning drinking alcohol in public vary significantly around the world. "Public" in this context refers to outdoor spaces such as roads, walkways, parks, or in a moving vehicle. Drinking in bars, restaurants, stadiums, and other such establishments, for example, is not generally considered to be "in public" even though those establishments are open to the general public.

In some countries, such as Norway, Poland, India and Sri Lanka, some states in the United States, as well as Muslim-majority countries where alcohol is legal, public drinking is almost universally condemned or outlawed, while in other countries, such as Denmark, Portugal, Spain, Germany, the United Kingdom, New Zealand, Japan, Finland, and China, public drinking is socially acceptable.

== Controversy ==
Opponents of drinking in public (such as religious organizations or governmental agencies) argue that it encourages overconsumption of alcohol and binge drinking, rowdiness, and violence, and propose that people should instead drink at private businesses such as public houses, bars, or clubs, where a bartender may prevent overconsumption and where rowdiness can be better controlled by the fact that one is sitting down and security or bouncers may be present. Alternatively, adults may drink at home. Opponents of normalizing the public consumption of alcohol are also concerned about the risks associated with public inebriation such as broken bottles on the street and aggressive behavior while intoxicated.

Proponents of the right to drink in public argue that it is a victimless crime that does not itself cause problems and rather that it is social problems that cause over-consumption and violence, pointing to countries that allow drinking in public but have low levels of associated overconsumption and violence. Proponents further argue that drinking in public helps normalize attitudes towards drinking and builds a healthier drinking culture.

=== Environment ===
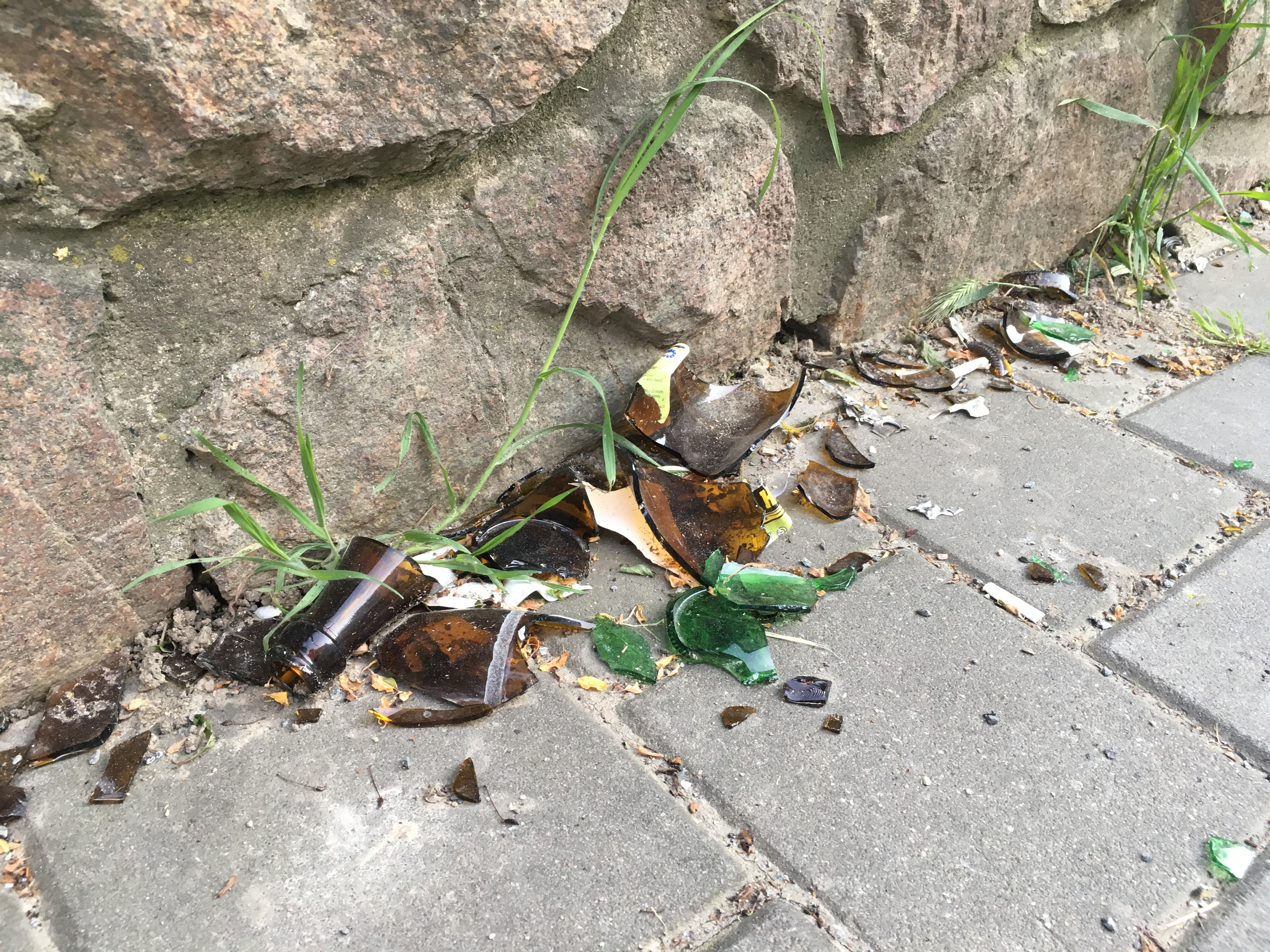
Broken beer bottles

Alcoholic beverage containers, particularly broken glass bottles, are a common source of litter that is difficult to clean up, which may puncture bicycle tires, hurt wildlife animals, etc. Alcoholic bottles are often discarded improperly, not recycled, or left in public spaces, which have negative impacts on the environment. Alcohol may negatively impact decision-making in taking environmental responsibility.

== By country ==
=== Australia ===
Although details and penalties vary from state to state, drinking in public places directly outside licensed premises (and also in council-designated no-alcohol zones) is illegal. Generally, possession of an open container of alcohol is sufficient proof of public drinking.

In New South Wales, drinking in public is legal unless an area is declared to be an alcohol-free zone. Council rangers and authorized staff are allowed to use their discretion to confiscate and tip out open containers in public streets in officially designated alcohol-free zones within their council boundaries; but not arrest nor issue fines/infringements for this purpose, leading many to turn a "blind eye" to these infractions to avoid conflict and fights. Specific management approaches acknowledge the need for a differentiated approach toward "refractory" street drinkers.

=== Austria ===
In Austria, the possession and consumption of open containers of alcohol is legal throughout the country by people of the legal drinking age. The legal drinking age depends on the beverage in question: 16 for beer and wine and 18 for distilled spirits and mixed drinks. In Carinthia, teenagers between 16 and 18 are further restricted to a blood alcohol level below 0.05.

Some cities, like Vienna, Graz in Styria, or Klagenfurt in Carinthia, limit public consumption of alcohol in specific areas.

=== Brazil ===
Having an open container is legal in Brazil. Drinking publicly is legal and socially accepted. However, DUI laws have been enforced since 2008 and offenders may be arrested and lose their license. At the time, this was already considered an infraction for many decades, but the law was permissive and unenforced. The introduction of the no tolerance policy was considered controversial and was often disputed in court for years until the culture fully adjusted. Being intoxicated in public is not an offense, and unless people are disturbed, the individual cannot be arrested. It is illegal to sell alcohol to minors (under 18).

=== Belgium ===
In Belgium drinking in public is legal however some cities (like Antwerp and Brussels) have local ordinances making public alcohol consumption illegal (mostly in specified areas like major squares or streets near the city center). Although these laws are not always enforced, they can result in fines of up to €500.

=== Canada ===
In Canada, except Quebec, possession of open containers of alcohol in public is generally a violation of provincial acts and municipal bylaws. Open liquor is not permitted except in private residences or on licensed premises. Open liquor is also illegal in parts of national and provincial parks, though this prohibition may not apply to campsites, as it is a temporary residence. For instance, Ontario Provincial Parks allow alcohol on campsites only.

In British Columbia and Ontario, the penalty for possession of an open container or consumption of liquor in a public place is a fine (as per the Liquor Licence Act, sec 31(2)). Those caught by law enforcement officers are forced to pour out the alcoholic beverage, after which offenders are sometimes issued a verbal warning instead of a monetary penalty.

In Quebec, laws on the consumption of alcohol in public are more relaxed than in the rest of Canada. Most notably, in Montreal, alcohol may be consumed in public parks when accompanied by food which can include snacks. Generally, the police will not check for food accompanying alcoholic drinks in public parks. Mount Royal is generally the public park where drinking rules are very relaxed, with police never checking if food is present with alcoholic drinks. However, drinking while riding public transit is forbidden.

In Alberta, 2020 amendments to the Gaming, Liquor, and Cannabis Act enabled municipalities to designate locations within public parks where individuals may consume alcohol without being accompanied by a meal.

=== Chile ===
Chile has one of the highest alcohol consumption rates in the Americas. Efforts to mitigate alcohol-related harm frequently encounter opposition from the alcohol industry, policymakers, and the public. While public drinking is generally prohibited in Chile, it is an exception during New Year's Eve. According to Article 25 of the Alcohol Law, consuming alcoholic beverages in streets, roads, squares, walkways, and other public areas is forbidden.

=== China ===
The drinking culture in China has historically been strong and is actively growing. It is seen as a social and cultural staple, with alcohol consumption being broadly accepted in society and featuring heavily in both traditional Chinese folklore and modern-day media. As the Chinese economy developed and the average disposable income per citizen increased alcohol consumption increased with it, but drinking culture only really started to flourish after the de-regulation of China's previously monopolized alcohol market in the reform and opening up era of the 1970s and '80s. Since then China's alcohol market has become the single-largest in the world. Alcohol regulations and laws are described as "lax" and alcohol is sold anywhere from convenience stores to street stalls. Since 2017 there has not been any law specifically regulating the marketing of alcohol, leading to advertisements of alcoholic beverages being commonplace in public spaces and even commonplace in broadcasts from state-owned companies like CCTV. Drinking in public is widely accepted and there are no laws against publicly consuming alcohol. Alcohol taxes are low and tariffs on imported alcohol have been dramatically reduced since China joined the WTO in 2001, leading to low alcohol prices and increased overall consumption.

=== Colombia ===
Colombia's view on public consumption of alcohol is unusual—even regarding drug consumption. Historically and culturally, Colombia has never forbidden public consumption of alcohol and drugs—the latter to a certain extent. However, in 2018 as President Ivan Duque assumed office he established particular national ordinances that effectively banned public alcohol consumption as well as ruled out the "personal drug dosage" tolerance previously allowed. This resulted in higher police corruption and arrests, as well as general disgust from the younger population. In mid-2019, however, the Supreme Court ruled out these ordinances bringing back the people its freedom to publicly consume alcohol and personal drug dosage with the purpose of "developing the free healthy culture".

=== Cuba ===
Public consumption of alcoholic beverages is accepted and legal.

=== Czech Republic ===
In the Czech Republic, drinking in public is generally legal, but each community is entitled to restrict public drinking by ordinance. As a result of this, some towns and cities have forbidden drinking in public to prevent people from disorderly conduct and begging.

=== Denmark ===
Generally, public consumption of alcohol in Denmark is legal, as long as it does not disturb public law and order. As a result, multiple cafes located in the same zones have outdoor serving. Some municipalities have enacted local ordinances forbidding public drinking in certain areas. As of 2015, 50 of the 98 municipalities had enacted alcohol prohibition zones.

=== Finland ===
In Finland, drinking in public is prohibited in built areas (taajama), at border crossings, or in vehicles in use for public transport such as buses or trams. The law does not apply to restaurants, pubs, and other licensed premises, or to the interior of vehicles such as taxis or limousines that are in private use. Public parks or equivalent venues are also exempt, as long as the consumption of alcohol does not cause undue public disturbance. While drinking on streets and public transport is technically illegal, in practice the authorities intervene only if a disturbance is being caused. Drinking in trains and buses is more strictly forbidden while drinking on streets is socially accepted.

The definition of a built area depends on the definition of a locality, or taajama in Finnish, which is a cluster of buildings with no less than 200 inhabitants, where the buildings are no more than 200 meters apart. This means that some areas within towns and cities may not fill the definition, making it legal to drink alcohol in public there, while some areas outside of towns and cities may have high enough population densities to be considered localities, therefore making public drinking illegal. Entering or leaving localities is marked by road signs along the major thoroughfares.

=== France ===
Public drinking in France is legal. It is illegal to sell alcohol to minors (under 18). However local laws may ban public drinking or the purchase of alcohol in certain areas or at certain times.

Public intoxication is illegal in France and an intoxicated person may be detained by the police or gendarmes and placed in a secure room (possibly a holding cell) until sober. The maximum fine is €150.

=== Germany ===
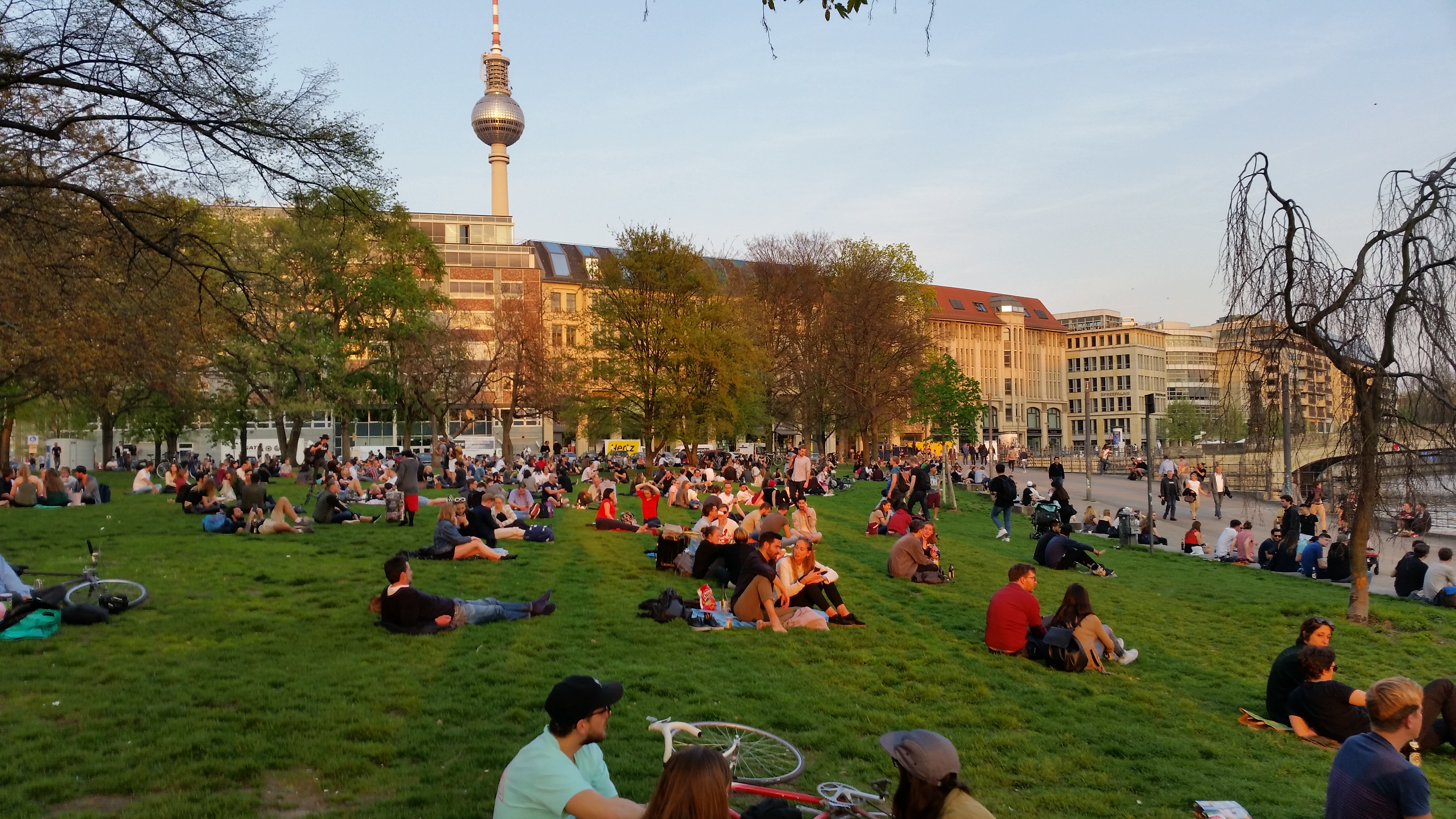
During the warmer months, parks in Germany are popular locations for alcohol consumption.

The possession of open containers of alcohol and drinking in public (streets, parks, etc.) is legal. Many cities forbid or restrict the consumption of alcohol in public transit or inside train stations. For example, the city of Hamburg made drinking on public trains and buses illegal in 2011. Deutsche Bahn forbids "excessive" consumption of alcohol in Berlin S-Bahn stations; violations are considered a civil and not criminal matter. Similarly, BVG excludes intoxicated passengers only if they threaten operational order or safety. The rules on trains vary considerably; the North German Metronom Eisenbahngesellschaft banned alcohol consumption on its trains in 2009, while the Deutsche Bahn sells alcohol to travelers on its trains. Many regional transit authorities that do not ban alcohol consumption in trains make efforts to contain disruptive behavior, such as by providing additional dedicated trains for football (soccer) fans traveling to or from matches.

=== Hong Kong ===
In Hong Kong, drinking alcoholic beverages in public is legal for adults above the age of 18. In 2018, Hong Kong strengthened its liquor regulations, prohibiting the sale and supply of alcohol to persons under 18 in all premises, including retail stores, as part of broader efforts to curb underage drinking.

=== Hungary ===
In Hungary, drinking alcohol in public is generally legal, but some municipalities have local laws banning public drinking with fines up to 150 000 Ft.

=== India ===
Alcohol traditionally was generally frowned upon in India by all religious entities. Drinking in public is quite unusual on the streets but on the contrary quite usual in some areas with a bar or wine store. There could be several people drinking on one corner of the street, but one may not openly carry and consume a bottle of alcohol on the streets.

=== Italy ===
Italy has no national laws against public drinking specifically, although local municipalities can issue regulations (ordinanza municipale) that prohibit public drinking at certain locations of the municipality, or during specific times. Local regulations must also set the fines issued to offenders.

Despite public drinking being generally legal, national law punishes public drunkenness. According to article 688 of the Italian penal code, anybody who is manifestly drunk in a public setting may be fined from €51 to €309. The fine can be increased for repeat offenders.

=== Republic of Ireland ===
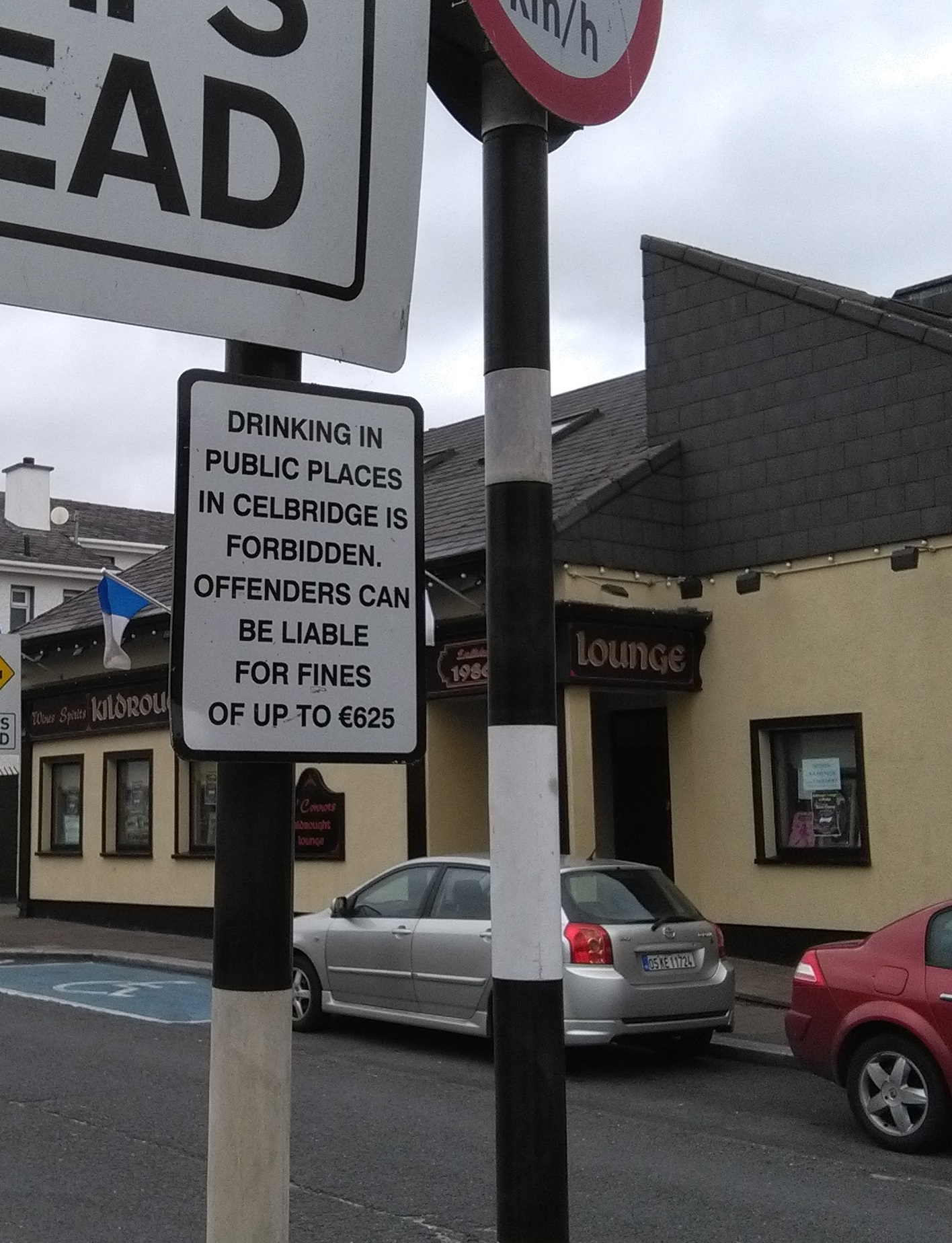
Sign in Celbridge, Ireland, declaring that public drinking is punishable by a fine

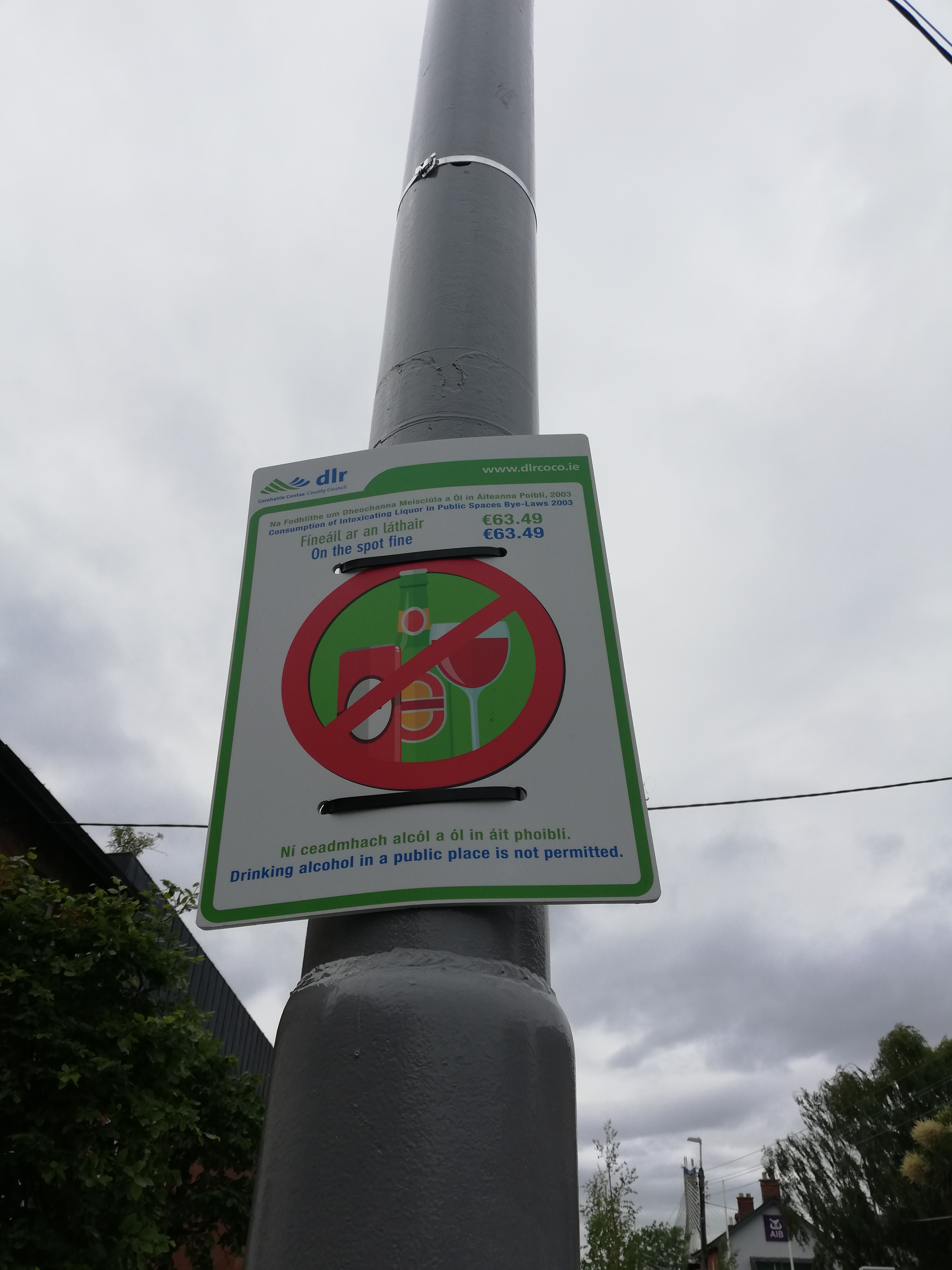
Sign in Dundrum, Dublin, declaring that public drinking is punishable by a fine

The Republic of Ireland has no laws against public drinking, except that alcohol in a closed container cannot be consumed within 100 m (110 yd) of the off license where it was purchased. Some towns and cities have by-laws forbidding public drinking.

The sale of alcohol in stores or off-license is legal between the hours of 10:30 AM and 10:00 PM with the exception of Sunday morning, when the sale of alcohol is forbidden until 12:30 PM. The sale of alcohol in bars and pubs is prohibited after 3:00 AM and before 10:30 AM, with the exception of those with special licenses, which is rare. These bars are known locally as "early houses". The law prohibiting the sale of alcohol on Good Friday was changed in 2018, much like the prohibition of alcohol sales on Saint Patricks' Day being lifted in the 1970s.

Hotels, airports and trains are exceptions to all of the above, and the sale of alcohol is legal all year round.

Under the Criminal Justice (Public Order) Act 1994, it is an offence for a person to be so drunk in a public place as to be a danger to oneself or others; to do so could lead to drink being confiscated by Gardaí (police) and a Class E fine (up to €500).

=== Japan ===
Japan has no laws forbidding public drinking, which is a common custom in cities and parks, particularly during local festivals (matsuri) and cherry blossom viewing (hanami) in spring. The legal drinking age in Japan is 20 years of age.

=== Laos ===
There is no open container law in Laos. The legal age for drinking in public in Laos is 18, there is no age restriction on private residences.

=== Latvia ===
In Latvia, until 2020 drinking alcoholic beverages in public was banned and classified as an administrative violation. Since 1 January 2020, the ban was lifted on the national level due to administrative law reforms enacted by the Ministry of Justice, although municipalities are able to apply separate rules in their administrative territories. Riga and four other republican cities (out of nine) still classify this as an administrative offense, although degrees of enforcement vary.

=== Lithuania ===
In Lithuania, drinking alcoholic beverages in public is illegal, prohibited, and subject to fines.

=== Mexico ===
Drinking in public is mostly illegal in Mexico. The laws that sanction it are regulated at the municipal level—being no federal outlawing on public consumption, as are the cases of Mexico City and Monterrey. Certain spots are more lenient or tolerant within the law to a certain extent, such as certain tourist zones in Cancun. For the most part, however, public drinking is still banned even if it is socially accepted and tolerated by authorities to do so in certain neighborhoods, communities, or localities.

=== Netherlands ===
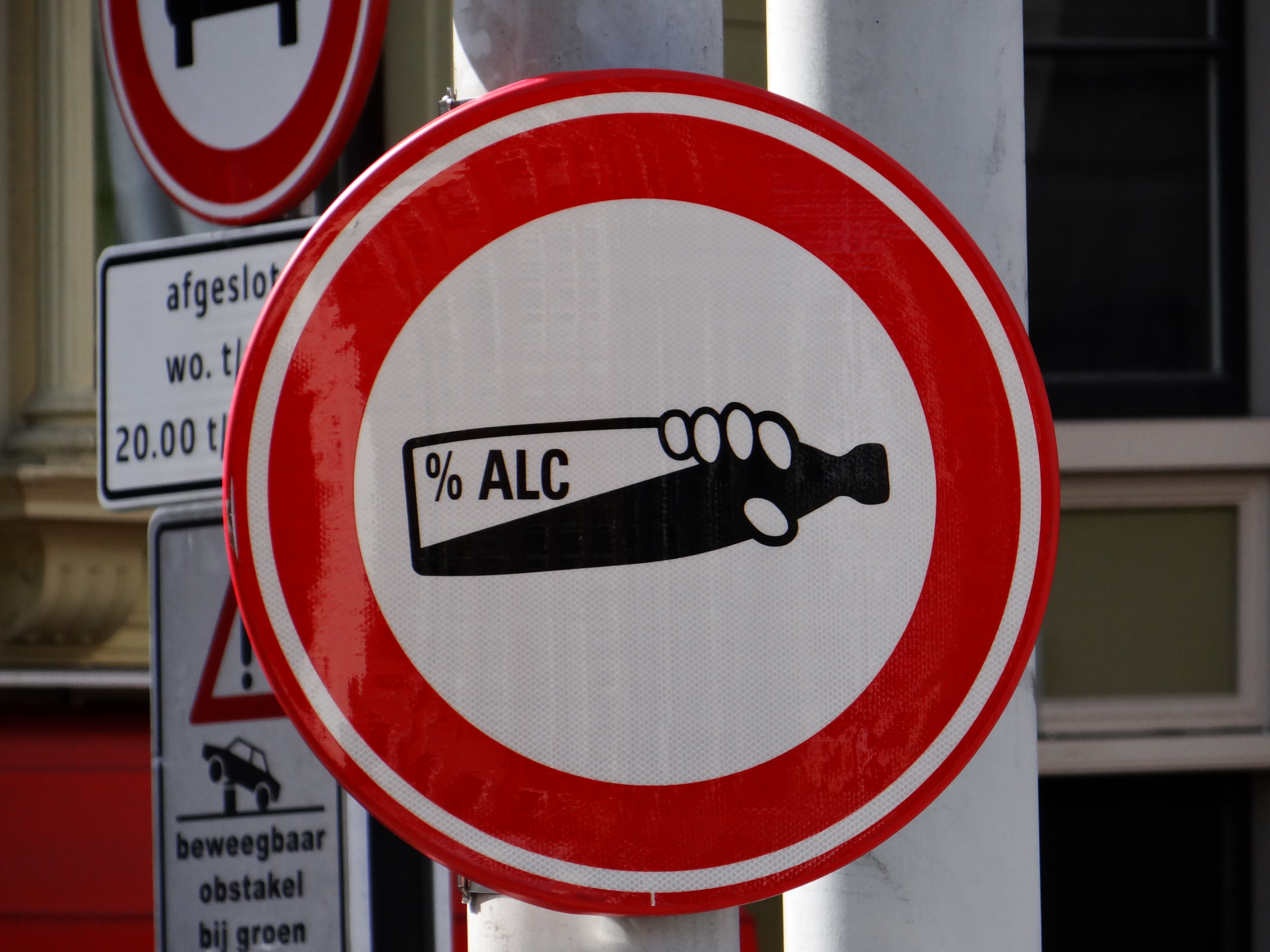
A sign prohibiting public alcohol consumption in the Netherlands

While drinking in public is legal in general, most city governments include laws in their local ordinance that cite certain public streets and locations in which it is forbidden to drink alcohol or carry open bottles and cans (except in restaurants, pubs, bars etc.). Furthermore, "public drunkenness", which refers to the act of antisocial behavior or overly bothering others due to alcohol, is punishable anywhere. However, in practise, public drunkenness is relatively accepted, especially at night, and in cases of disturbances punishments are non-existent or very mild as long as the disturbances don't involve other illegal activities such as acts of violence. Only 29% of Dutch municipalities have reported that they check for drunkenness among patrons of alcohol-serving establishments compared to 87% of municipalities reporting that they check for ID to ensure patrons are of legal age when they purchase alcohol. Drinking culture, including in public, remains pervasive in Dutch society.

=== New Zealand ===
In New Zealand, public drinking is legal, although local authorities have power to pass bylaws declaring liquor-free zones, where liquor may be consumed on licensed premises and private property but not on the street or other public areas. Many towns now have such zones, usually covering their Central Business District. Consuming alcohol while driving a motor vehicle is legal, as long as the driver is not over the driver blood alcohol limit, and the alcohol is not consumed in a liquor-free zone. Similarly, passengers of motor vehicles are allowed to consume alcohol as long as they are not in a liquor-free zone. Sale of alcohol to intoxicated persons is illegal. Under the Summary Offences Act 1981 it is an offence to drink alcohol in public transport, aeroplanes and taxis unless the vehicle is a licensed premises. Most commercial flights as well as many ferries and trains serve alcohol on board.

=== Norway ===
Drinking in public is illegal in Norway and subject to fines. In many cities the police will primarily react if the use of alcohol is causing trouble. Drinking in parks is quite common even though it is not legal by law. Most officers will ask the drinker to empty the bottle without further reactions. Although fines as high as 9000NOK may be issued due to public drinking.

=== Poland ===
In Poland, since 2018 drinking in public has been illegal as a general rule, and police take a strict approach to enforcement of the law. Municipal authorities may allow it in designated areas only.

=== Romania ===
Drinking in public is illegal in Romania, unless it occurs in spaces where events are organized for the celebration of New Year's Eve, the days of administrative-territorial units, of socio-professional categories or for the promotion of food or non-food products, but also in specially arranged and delimited perimeters where cultural-artistic events take place with controlled access.

=== Russia ===
According to Article 20.20 of the Code of Administrative Offences of Russia, drinking in a place where it is forbidden by federal law is punishable with a fine of 500 to 1500 rubles. Article 16 of the Federal Law No. 171-FZ "On State Regulation of Production and Circulation of Ethyl Alcohol and Alcohol Products and Restriction on Alcohol Consumption (Drinking)" forbids drinking in almost all public places, including entrance halls, staircases, and elevators of residential buildings, except bars, restaurants, or other similar establishments where it is permitted to sell alcoholic products for immediate consumption.

=== Singapore ===
Drinking in public is legal in Singapore; however, consumption of alcohol in a public space or non-licensed premise is restricted from 10:30 PM to 7:00 AM following the 2013 Little India riot. Since July 2020, this was extended to all licensed food and beverage premises from 10:30 PM as a temporary COVID measure. This measure was lifted in March 2022. All patrons consuming alcohol must finish their drinks before the stipulated time. A permit is required to consume alcohol during restricted hours in public places. Sales are prohibited from supermarkets and convenience stores, such as NTUC FairPrice, Giant Hypermarket, Sheng Siong, Cold Storage and 7-Eleven from 10:30 PM to 7:00 AM.

The condition of carriage of alcohol is prohibited even between 10:30 PM and 7:00 AM on SMRT Trains and SBS Transit services.

=== Slovakia ===
In Slovakia, drinking alcoholic beverages in public is illegal in many cities, and punishable by a fine up to 33 EUR, although, it is not very respected.

=== South Korea ===
In general, drinking in public is legal. But any person who, while drunk, behaves in a riotous or disorderly manner by rough words or conduct in a public place may be fined up to 100,000 won.

Since 2009, stricter laws are in force in some parts of the country that started with Seoul's Dongjak District, which designates city parks and bus stops as no-drinking areas and any drinker caught in these areas will be advised to stop drinking by city officials.

=== Spain ===
Public drinking is only prohibited in some cities or parts of cities, regulated by local laws like in Barcelona.

The practice of botellón (Public binge drinking) is relatively popular among teenagers and young adults partly in response to rising drink prices at bars or clubs, and partly because more people can meet in one place.

=== Sweden ===
Public drinking is regulated by municipalities in local ordinance, setting up zones where consumption of beverages containing more than 2.25% ABV is prohibited. These zones are usually located in city centres, around schools, churches and parks. Drinking in these zones usually result in the police confiscating any opened containers or a fine. The police may confiscate all alcohol if the person in question is also under 20 years of age. Only public spaces within these zones are regulated, excluding venues licensed to serve alcohol, and for example cars parked in the zone.

=== Switzerland ===
Public drinking in Switzerland is legal. Although Switzerland has a legal purchase age of 16 for beer and wine, and 18 for spirits (18 for both in Ticino), it is not illegal for a minor to consume alcohol in public by federal laws. But the cantons Aargau, Zürich, Solothurn and Bern have laws which make it illegal to give alcohol to minors under the federal purchase age laws (exceptions are made for parents).

Furthermore, cantonal laws prohibit the consumption and/or sale of alcohol at the following public places:

- Gambling establishments (serving, consuming and selling): Bern, Lucerne, Nidwalden and Obwalden.
- Gas station (only sale): Basel-Landschaft (only spirits), Fribourg (only spirits), Geneva, Jura and Uri.
- Swimming pools (sale and consumption): Basel-Landschaft, Basel-Stadt and St. Gallen.
- Youth Centre (sale and consumption): Basel-Landschaft and Basel-Stadt.
- Educational establishments (sale and consumption): Basel-Stadt, Jura, Schaffhausen and Zürich.

=== United Kingdom ===
==== England and Wales ====
Drinking in public is legal in England and Wales. Separately, one may drink on aeroplanes and on most National Rail train services, either purchasing alcohol on-board or consuming one's own.

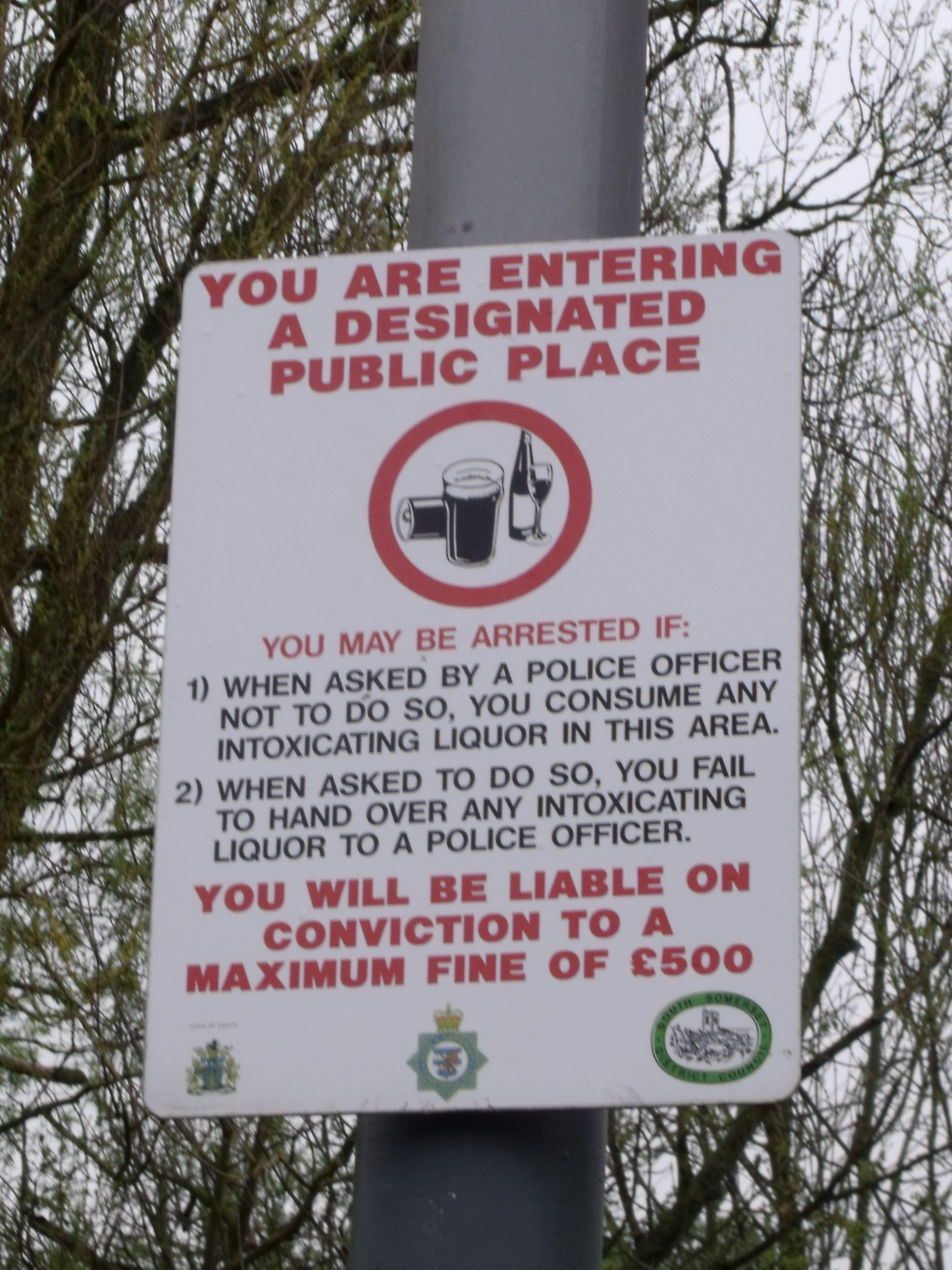
Sign in Yeovil, England, marking a Designated Public Place

In certain public places, it may be requested that people do not drink alcohol in that area. It is not illegal to drink in these areas – contrary to popular misconception. However, in these areas, police may request the individual to stop drinking and potentially also surrender their alcohol, both open and closed containers. Police Officers can only request that alcohol is surrendered if the drinkers are acting antisocially or they have good reason to believe they are going to do so. These are formally known as Designated Public Places Orders (DPPOs), and were allowed by The Criminal Justice and Police Act 2001 (CJPA); they are more popularly known as 'Controlled Drinking Zones' (CDZs).

Following the election of Boris Johnson as mayor of London, the conditions of carriage on most modes of London public transportation (specifically those under the management of Transport for London – London Buses, London Underground, London Overground, Docklands Light Railway, Tramlink and more recently, the IFS Cloud cable car and Elizabeth line) were updated to ban the carrying of open alcohol containers and the consumption of alcohol. This does not apply to non-Transport for London commuter services, including National Rail and Thames Clippers. This was supported by those who felt it would decrease antisocial behaviour, but opposed by those who argued that alcohol relieved the discomfort of a commute. The end of drinking on public transport was marked by some festivities.

==== Northern Ireland ====
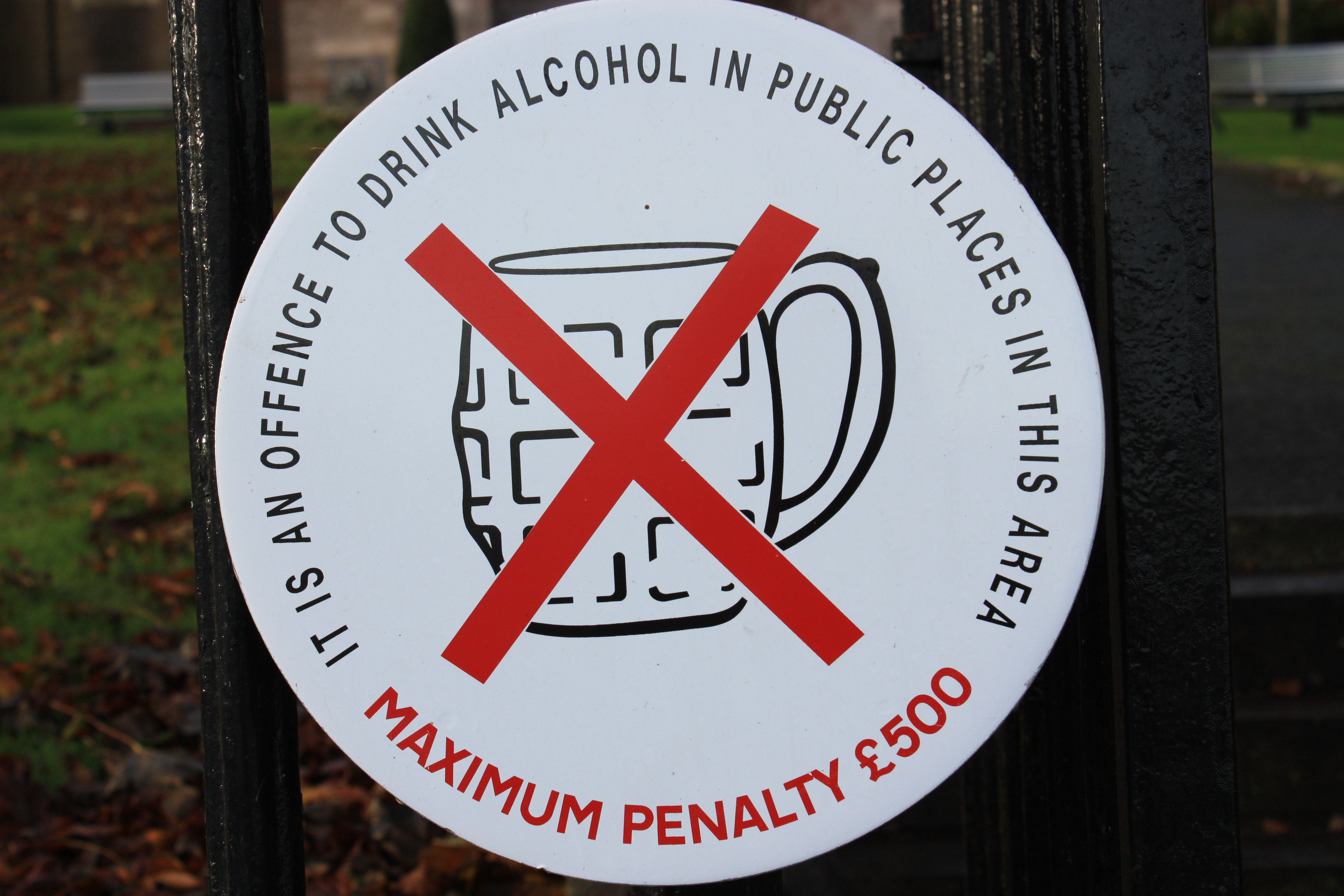
Sign in Armagh City saying it is an offense to drink in public in the area.

The majority of Belfast is designated an alcohol-free area, with fines of up to £500. Under the Criminal Justice (Northern Ireland) Order 1980, it is an offense to be drunk in a public place. Furthermore, under The Justice Act (NI) 2011, police can issue a fixed penalty notice to those over the age of 18 found intoxicated in a public place. On 12 July public holiday this law is relaxed unless anti-social behaviour is undertaken.

==== Scotland ====
In Scotland, each council has its bylaws concerning public alcohol consumption.

The City of Edinburgh allows the consumption of alcohol in public places but under the Edinburgh by-law, anyone drinking in public would have to stop if asked by police. In the Strathclyde region that includes Glasgow, the consumption of alcohol, or possession of an open container of alcohol, in public places has been illegal since 1996. Breaking this law can mean a fine. This ban was enforced due to the increase in drink-related violent crime. In the Perth & Kinross local authority, the consumption of alcohol in public places is illegal in the following places: Alyth, Crieff, Kinross, Scone, Aberfeldy, Blairgowrie, Dunkeld & Birnam, Milnathort, Coupar Angus, Errol, Perth City. Drinking publicly in these areas is chargeable offence. In St Andrews in Fife it is illegal to drink or even have an open drinks container on the street. On the spot fines can be handed out by the police. It is however legal to consume alcohol on any of the beaches in St Andrews.

=== United States ===
Laws against drinking in public are known as open container laws, as the presence of an open container of alcohol is seen as evidence of drinking in public and is far easier to witness and prove than the act of drinking.

In the United States, open container laws are state laws (rather than federal laws), and therefore they differ between states. There may also be local by-laws which further regulate the issue within a state. Drinking in public is illegal in most jurisdictions in the United States and this ban usually extends to include drinking within a moving car (related to drunk driving laws).

In some places and circumstances, public alcohol consumption is accepted. This includes such cities as New Orleans, Las Vegas, Atlantic City, Indianapolis, and Gainesville, Florida, as well as the state of Wisconsin, certain college campuses, and at certain sporting events such as tailgate parties.

Open containers of alcohol are often concealed in public, traditionally inside a brown paper bag, though this does not make them legal in jurisdictions where they are outlawed. If a law enforcement officer can detect that alcohol is being consumed, the violator may be cited or arrested.

=== Muslim-majority countries ===
Most Muslim-majority countries where alcohol is either legal for everybody or for non-Muslims only have laws against public drinking. Such countries include:

- Algeria
- Egypt
- Morocco
- Iran (for non-Muslim minorities only; alcohol illegal otherwise)
- Jordan
- Sudan (for non-Muslims)
- Pakistan (for non-Muslims only; alcohol illegal otherwise)
- Turkmenistan (on buses, trains, planes and ships)

== See also ==
- Alcohol-free zone
- Victimless crime
- Broken windows theory
