= Criminal behaviour order =

Type of court order in the UK

A criminal behaviour order (CBO) is an order to the offender issued by a judge in England and Wales, at the request of the prosecution, under Part 2 of the Anti-Social Behaviour, Crime and Policing Act 2014.

== Content ==
A CBO can be issued following a conviction for any criminal offence in the Crown Court, a magistrates' court or a youth court. There is great discretion on the content of the order. A CBO can prohibit the offender from doing anything described in the order or require the offender to do anything described in the order or both.

For a CBO to be made the court must be satisfied, beyond reasonable doubt, that the offender has engaged in behaviour that caused, or was likely to cause, harassment, alarm or distress to any person; and that the court considers making the order will help in preventing the offender from engaging in such behaviour.

For youth under 18, a CBO can last from 1 to 3 years and is reviewed annually. For adults over 18, a CBO lasts a minimum of two years and can last indefinitely. Breach of the CBO can result in the defendant being fined and imprisoned for up to four years.

== History ==
CBOs replace anti-social behaviour orders (ASBO) on conviction and drinking banning orders (DBO) on conviction.

== See also ==
- Anti-Social Behaviour, Crime and Policing Act 2014
- Public spaces protection order
