= London Anti-Street Harassment campaign =

Campaign against sexual harassment of women

The London Anti-Street Harassment campaign (or LASH campaign) was a campaign against the sexual harassment of women (including trans women and gender minorities) on the streets of London.

Founded in 2010 by Vicky Simister, the campaign aimed to reduce street harassment by calling for a public debate about the issue. It called for the education of the perpetrators and encouraged victims to speak out.

The main tool of the campaign was its website where it asked people to take action by adding their name to the campaign. The campaign aimed to empower women to use their voices and begin to dictate how they want to be treated in this society. The campaign aimed to do this by creating social debates which ultimately lead to education and social change. It created a platform for women to share stories and involved the work of politicians and journalists give better recognition to the stories. Further, a core aim of the campaign was to teach men about the real consequences of their actions and the impact of their words.

Politicians such as Labour MP for Hackney North and Stoke Newington, Diane Abbott, lent their names to the campaign. It also garnered media attention, including articles in The Observer and on BBC Radio.

== Street Harassment ==
The first national poll in the United Kingdom on street harassment in 2016 found that 64% of women of all ages have experienced unwanted sexual harassment in public places. Street Harassment is defined as "unwelcome comments or contact of a sexual nature directed at a person by a stranger in a public place." When breaking this down into age demographics it becomes clear that the most concentrated age for woman to experience street harassment are 18-24. Further, 35% of women had experienced unwanted sexual touching as well as 85% of women ages 18–24 had faced sexual harassment in public spaces and 45% had experienced unwanted sexual touching.

In the UK, sexual harassment is recognised as a form of discrimination under the Equality Act 2010 while harassment in public spaces is illegal under legislation such as the Protection from Harassment Act 1997 and the Public Order Act 1986. But street harassment has yet to be made a criminal offence. This means that, although women are being made to feel unsafe, physically and verbally in the streets, the consequences of the offenders actions are going to be limited. This reflects the general social attitude towards street harassment which is resulting in women being unable to leave their house without being in danger across the UK. This is what the 'London anti-street harassment campaign' is working to question and reform. Historically, the law has reflected social reforms when looking at the enforcement of laws surrounding female protection in the more generalised sense.

== Street Harassment post Covid-19 Lockdowns ==
In March 2020 the UK went into lockdown due to COVID-19, and lasted nearly a year, with most restrictions being lifted by July 2021. Studies conducted post-pandemic showed that there was a rise in anti-social behaviour (ASB) and hate crime incidents during the COVID-19 lockdowns. One category of ASB incidents that became more common during the lockdowns was street harassment in the form of catcalling and stalking. This rise in street harassment incidents was coupled with an increase in domestic abuse cases. In 2020, an average of 243 in 261 hospitalizations of female patients were traced to domestic violence.

In 2020, HuffPost led a journalistic campaign against street harassment in which the news outlet published a series of interviews of women affected by street harassment. Women interviewed by journalists during the COVID-19 lockdowns reported that the empty streets caused by lockdowns led to greater levels of harassment. One woman interviewed said that "Usually I do everything I can to blend in and not be noticed. But since I'm the only one running, I get the usual range of comments: ‘smile love’, ‘no make up today’, ‘beautiful runner!’ It's all pretty meaningless, but being the only one on the street means the vibe has changed."

== What is the UK plan to combat Street Harassment? ==
Recent events in the UK have caused major discussion both socially and politically regarding the safety of women on the streets. The abduction and murder of Sarah Everard in Hackney London, has caused women to share their stories. From street harassment to child molestation, there has been a clear emphasis on the abuse women go through with no justice being delivered. This has caused the UK government to 'consider' making street harassment a crime in order to combat this issue. The importance of having a no tolerance climate on abuse against women and girls, is significant when you look at the data. This is because, when you look at how street harassment is impacting girls. 2 out of 3 girls in the UK have been sexually harassed in public 35% of UK girls wearing school uniform have been sexually harassed in public and 33% of UK girls who have been sexually harassed felt too embarrassed to tell anyone.
