= Wasting police time =

Criminal offense in some countries

Wasting police time is listed as a criminal offence in many Commonwealth countries.

== United Kingdom ==
In England and Wales, one can be charged with the offence under Section 5(2) of the Criminal Law Act 1967 when one "causes any wasteful employment of the police" by "knowingly making to any person a false report" which:

- Shows that a criminal offence has been committed,
- Creates apprehension for the safety of any persons or property, or
- Indicates that they have information material to any police inquiry.

The offence carries a maximum penalty of six months' imprisonment and/or a fine. Less serious cases may result in a penalty notice for disorder of £80 for persons aged 16 or over and £40 for younger offenders.

The same applies to Northern Ireland according to Section 5(3) of the Criminal Law Act (Northern Ireland) 1967.

For Scotland the High Court of Justiciary stated in Kerr v. Hill that giving false information to the police constitutes a crime under common law.

== New Zealand ==
In New Zealand, one can be charged under Section 24 of the Summary Offences Act 1981 for committing either of the following acts:

- Making, or causing to be made, to a police employee any allegation of an offence "contrary to the fact and without a belief in the truth of the statement".
- Creating serious apprehension for the safety of any person or property (whether by statement or behaviour), either with the intention of causing wasteful employment or diversion of police resources, or being reckless as to that result.

A person convicted under this section may be sentenced to imprisonment for up to three months, or a fine of up to NZ$2000.

== Canada ==
In Canada, the offence (known as public mischief) is defined by section 140 of the Criminal Code:

140. (1) Every one commits public mischief who, with intent to mislead, causes a peace officer to enter on or continue an investigation by

(a) making a false statement that accuses some other person of having committed an offence;
(b) doing anything intended to cause some other person to be suspected of having committed an offence that the other person has not committed, or to divert suspicion from himself;
(c) reporting that an offence has been committed when it has not been committed; or
(d) reporting or in any other way making it known or causing it to be made known that he or some other person has died when he or that other person has not died.

(2) Every one who commits public mischief

(a) is guilty of an indictable offence and liable to imprisonment for a term not exceeding five years; or
(b) is guilty of an offence punishable on summary conviction.

== See also ==
- False alarm
