= Anti-social Behaviour, Crime and Policing Act 2014 =

Act of the Parliament of the United Kingdom

Anti-social Behaviour, Crime and Policing Act 2014 (Note: Section 186.)
- Act of Parliament
- Parliament of the United Kingdom
- Long title: An Act to make provision in connection with anti-social behaviour, crime and disorder, including provision about recovery of possession of dwelling-houses, to make provision amending the Dangerous Dogs Act 1991, the Police Act 1997, Schedules 7 and 8 to the Terrorism Act 2000, the Extradition Act 2003 and Part 3 of the Police Reform and Social Responsibility Act 2011; to make provision about firearms, about sexual harm and violence and about forced marriage; to make provision about the police, the Independent Police Complaints Commission and the Serious Fraud Office (United Kingdom); to make provision about invalid travel documents; to make provision about criminal justice and court fees; and for connected purposes.
- Citation: 2014 c. 12
- Introduced by: Theresa May (Commons); John Taylor, Baron Taylor of Holbeach (Lords)
- Territorial extent: United Kingdom (Note: Section 184.)

Dates
- Royal assent: 13 March 2014
- Commencement: Various (Note: Section 185.)
Other legislation
Amends	Firearms Act 1968; House of Commons Disqualification Act 1975; Police Pensions Act 1976; Customs and Excise Management Act 1979; Magistrates' Courts Act 1980; Criminal Attempts Act 1981; Criminal Justice Act 1988; Dangerous Dogs Act 1991; Criminal Procedure (Scotland) Act 1995; Police Act 1996; Firearms (Amendment) Act 1997; Police Act 1997; Terrorism Act 2000; Anti-terrorism, Crime and Security Act 2001; Extradition Act 2003; Drugs Act 2005; Violent Crime Reduction Act 2006; Mental Health Act 2007; Criminal Justice and Immigration Act 2008; Counter-Terrorism Act 2008; Police Reform and Social Responsibility Act 2011; Legal Aid, Sentencing and Punishment of Offenders Act 2012
Repeals/revokes	Anti-social Behaviour Act 2003 Pts 1 and 1A
Amended by	Investigatory Powers Act 2016; Policing and Crime Act 2017; Wales Act 2017; Sentencing (Pre-consolidation Amendments) Act 2020; Sentencing Act 2020; Marriage and Civil Partnership (Minimum Age) Act 2022

Status: Amended

Text of statute as originally enacted

Revised text of statute as amended

The Anti-social Behaviour, Crime and Policing Act 2014 (c. 12) is an act of the Parliament of the United Kingdom which consolidated and expanded law enforcement powers in addressing anti-social behaviour. One significant aspect of the act is that it replaced anti-social behaviour orders, the primary civil order in the United Kingdom since 1998, with criminal behaviour orders.

== Background ==
The 2010 coalition government expressed its intention to replace ASBOs, citing the reasons that "breach rates are high, and the number issued has been steadily declining since 2005." In July 2010, Home Secretary Theresa May announced her intention to reform anti-social behaviour measures for England and Wales, with the abolition of ASBOs in due course in favour of alternative "community-based" social control policies.

In 2012, the government produced a white paper titled Putting victims first: more effective responses to anti-social behaviour, that outlined its intentions about reforming anti-social behaviour legislation. The white paper stated that it wanted to challenge "dangerous and yobbish behaviour of those who make victims' lives a misery". Liberal Democrat objections prevented the implementation of the paper's proposals. The 2013 government paper, Reform of Anti-Social Behaviour Powers: Groups 'Hanging Around' mentioned specifically targeting certain types of youths behaviour. It mentioned that the government acknowledged that youths 'hanging about' might cause people to feel intimidated and fear for their safety regardless if their behaviour was anti-social. Government publications also revealed it was eager to deal with concerns about the perceived anti-social behaviour of people who are drunks, beggars, and irresponsible dog owners.

In May 2013, an Anti-social Behaviour, Crime and Policing Bill was introduced into the House of Commons, including a provision to create "injunctions to prevent nuisance and annoyance", replacing ASBOs in England and Wales. The bill was criticised for the broad and undefined scope of "nuisance and annoyance", and was rejected by the House of Lords in January 2014. The Anti-Social Behaviour, Crime and Policing Act 2014 was then introduced, and received royal assent on 13 March 2014.

== Putting victims first ==
The focus for the act was on putting victims first, and the powers are designed to be quicker to implement so that victims get respite from anti-social behaviour faster. With the exception of the criminal behaviour order, the remainder can be processed through the civil courts which allows for a lower burden of proof and thus makes it easier for agencies to obtain. The act also set out an absolute possession enabling councils and housing associations to evict anti-social tenants already found guilty of anti-social behaviour.

To put victims first, there were also two measures introduced in this act to enable victims to have their say:

1. Community remedy – whereby victims can have a say in what type of punishment would be appropriate for the offender (e.g. clean up graffiti)
2. Anti-social behaviour case review – also called 'community trigger'. A victim can insist on a multi-agency review of their case if they have reported the problem three times in the past six months and yet the problem has not yet been resolved.

== Consolidation ==
The focus of the Act was to streamline the tools and powers available to front-line agencies in dealing with anti-social behaviour. Previously there had been nineteen different powers, but these were reduced to a base of six.

The previous nineteen mechanisms were:

- Anti-social behaviour injunctions
- Anti-social behaviour orders (ASBOs)
- Closure orders (known as S.161)
- Crackhouse closure orders
- Criminal anti-social behaviour orders (CrASBOs)
- Designated public place orders
- Direction to leave orders (known as S.27)
- Disposal orders (known as S.30)
- Dog control orders
- Drinking banning orders
- Drinking banning orders (on conviction)
- Gating orders
- Graffiti/defacement removal notices
- Individual support orders
- Intervention orders
- Litter cleaning notices
- Noisy premises closure orders
- Premises closure orders
- Street litter cleaning notices

The Anti-Social Behaviour, Crime and Policing Act 2014 consolidated them to:

- Civil injunctions
- Criminal behaviour orders
- Dispersal powers
- Community protection notices and remedial orders
- Public spaces protection orders
- Closure notices and orders
- Absolute grounds for possession

The government produces statutory guidance about the use of the six new mechanisms. December 2017 is the latest revision of the guidance as of May 2018.

=== Civil injunctions ===
Part 1 of the Act empowers specified organisations to apply to the courts for a civil injunction against anyone aged 10 or over for actual or threatened anti-social behaviour. Suggested by the government is that civil injunctions might be used for aggressive begging, bullying, gangs, irresponsible dog ownership, noisy or abusive neighbours, public drunkenness, and vandalism. The injunction is a civil rather than a criminal order. A civil injunction can either prohibit or require a person to refrain from activities mentioned in the order. A court has the discretion if to include a power of arrest for breaches of the injunction. Breaches of an injunction are treated as contempt of court. Statutory government guidance provides four tests for using a civil injunction. On the balance of probabilities, the behaviour must be likely to cause harassment, alarm or distress (non-housing related anti-social behaviour); or conduct capable of causing nuisance or annoyance (housing-related anti-social behaviour); and just and convenient to grant the injunction to prevent anti-social behaviour.

=== Dispersal powers ===
Part 3 of the Act covers police powers permitting the dispersal of people. The powers of dispersal require the authorisation of a police officer at least the rank of inspector. The act only allows authorising dispersal powers when members of the public in the locality are being harassed, alarmed or distressed, or when there is localised crime and disorder. The authorisation is limited to forty-eight hours. Authorising officers should consider the principles of the Human Rights Act. The statutory Government guidance requires consideration of the impact of vulnerable people, the displacement of the problems elsewhere, and if working in partnership with other agencies might provide a longer-term solution.

When authorised to do so, police officers and police community support officers, if permitted by their chief constable, can, in writing when feasible, direct a person to leave a geographical area and not return for a defined time period. The exceptions are people under ten years old, in which case if they are under sixteen the Children Act 2004 allows taking them to their home. A direction should not be given that prevents a person from going to their home, their place of employment, where they are receiving education or training, places where they are receiving medical treatment or any place they are required to attend by a court. The power exists to seize any articles that are connected to the anti-social behaviour. Failing to disperse or preventing the seizure of articles related to the anti-social behaviour is a criminal offence.

=== Public spaces protection orders ===
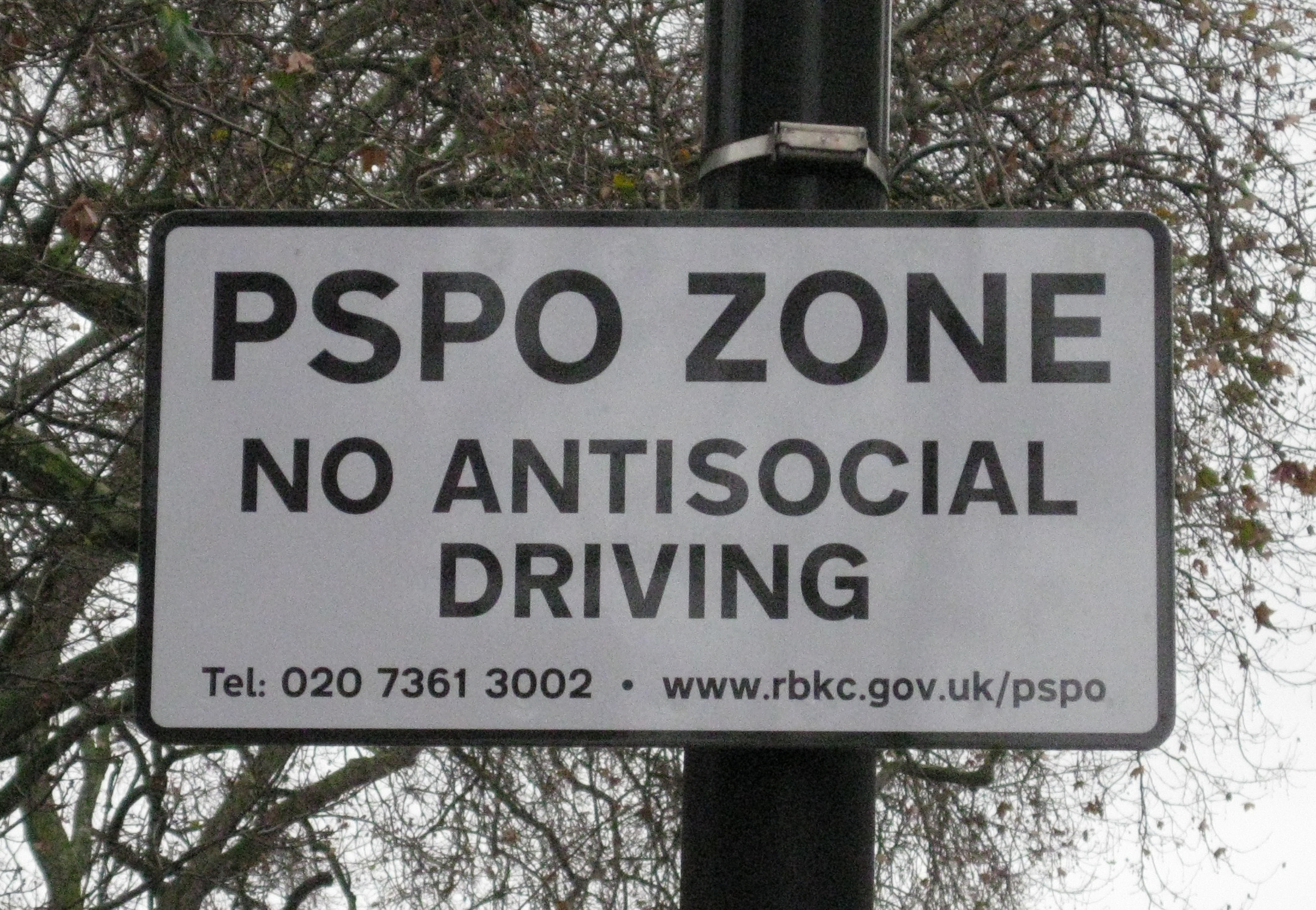
PSPO warning sign in Knightsbridge, London

Public spaces protection orders are orders which ban specific acts in a designated geographical area in England and Wales as set out in the act. It replaces the earlier designated public place orders, gating orders and dog control orders.

PSPOs are intended to prevent specific acts which would not otherwise be criminal offences. They have been criticised as restricting freedoms and having a disproportionately severe effect on people below the poverty line. As of December 2017, there were 388 active PSPOs in Wales alone.

Uses of PSPOs have ranged from Salford City Council's ban on foul and abusive language in the Salford Quays area, to the enactment by Kettering Borough Council of a curfew banning individuals under 18 from going outside alone between 11pm and 6am.

Research by The Manifesto Club found a 420% increase in PSPO fines from 2016 to 2018. In 2018 there were 9,930 fixed penalty notices issued, 60% of which were from four councils: Peterborough, Bedford, Hillingdon and Waltham Forest. These four councils use private contractors to issue the fines.

=== Community protection notices and remedial orders ===
Part 4 of the Act introduced community protection notices and remedial orders. The aim of them was to challenge ongoing nuisance problems detrimental to a community's quality of life. The use of community protection notices does not interfere with the obligation of local authorities to issue abatement notices for statutory nuisances.

A person over the age of sixteen, an organisation or business can be issued a community protection notice. The statutory guidance states that the vulnerability of a person should additionally be considered before issuing a notice. Before a notice is issued they must receive written notice warning them about the problem they are causing, and issuing a notice is an option being considered. It is issued by either giving it to a person, organisation or business, leaving at their address, or posting it to them. Community protection notices have three potential purposes, to stop or make them do something, or take reasonable steps towards an outcome. What is expected of them is written on the notice.

Failing to conform to a community protection notice is an offence. The liability of a person, organisation or business for the offence is negated by payment of a fixed penalty notice up to the value of £100. If a community protection notice is breached, a remedial order can be applied for at court.

=== Closure notices and orders ===
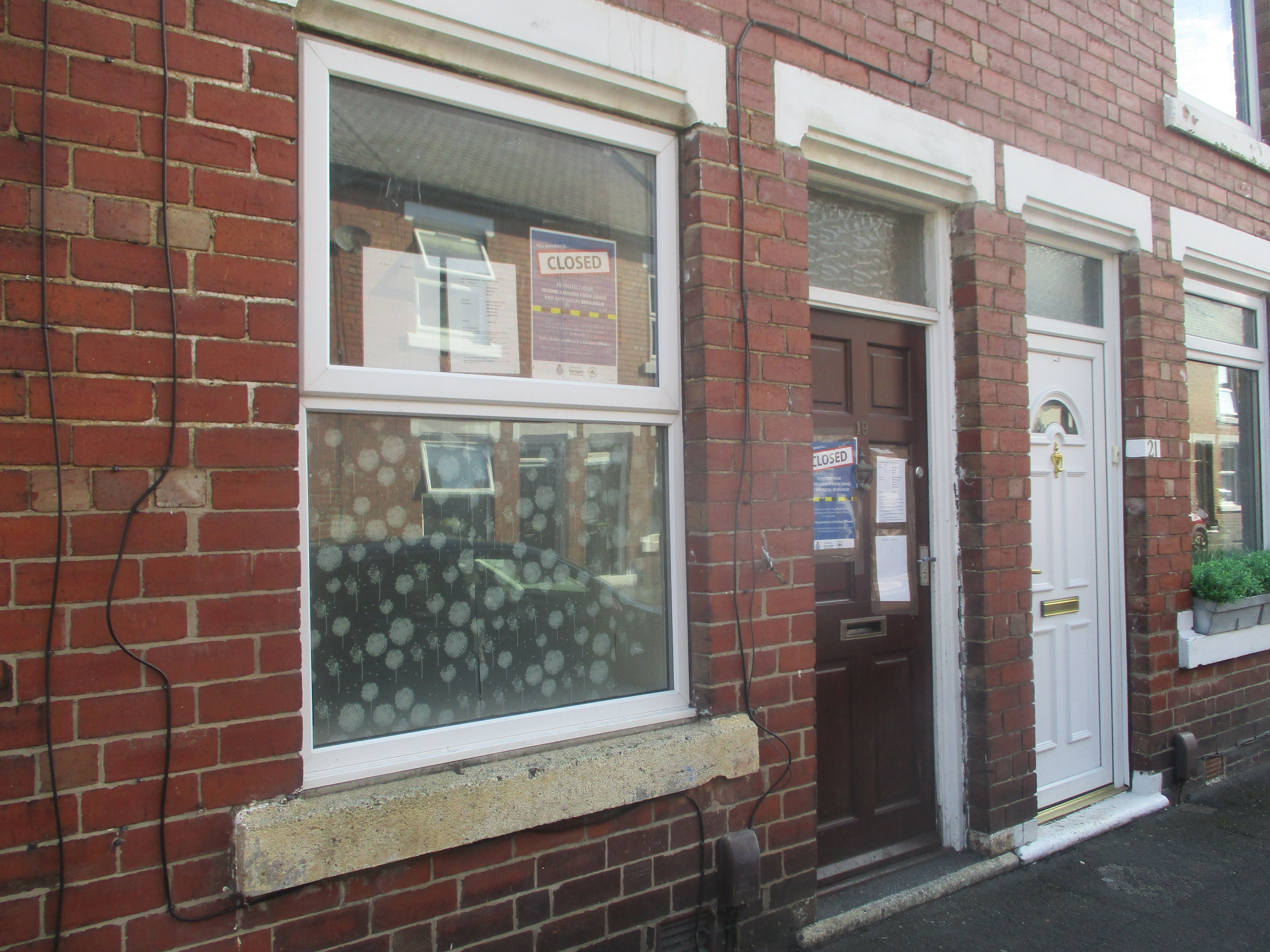
A closure notice issued under the act on residential property in Starbeck, Harrogate

Part 4 of the act empowers the issuing of closure notices and closure orders. Both notices and orders can be applied to residential and other premises. Issuing a closure notice is usually the first resort to dealing with a problem. Closure notices can be issued if either nuisance or disorder has, or may occur at the premises. The notice is in force for a maximum of forty-eight hours. A closure notice can bar any person from accessing the premises, except any residents. The penalty for breaching a notice upon conviction is a maximum of three months' imprisonment and an unlimited fine.

Closure orders are usually issued in more serious instances. The criteria for issuing an order is that the premises must be connected to disorderly, offensive, or criminal behaviour, or disorderly behaviour in the near vicinity of it. It must be a serious nuisance to the public. An order can prohibit any person from entering the premises, including a resident. The maximum penalty for breaching a notice is up to six months imprisonment and an unlimited fine.

The Anti-Social Behaviour, Crime and Policing Act 2014 created an offence of obstructing a person issuing an order or notice, officials entering the premises, or people securing it. The maximum penalty is three months imprisonment. The act did not consolidate all closure powers, for example, closure of licensed premises under the Licensing Act 2003, or closure of premises used for prostitution under the Sexual Offences Act 2003.

== Additional offences ==
The Anti-Social Behaviour, Crime and Policing Act 2014 included several additional provisions:

- Dangerous dogs
- Firearms
- Protection from sexual harm, including sexual risk orders
- Child sexual exploitation in hotels
- Violent offending
- Forced marriages
- Policing, including the National College of Policing, and complaints against the police
- Extradition
- Criminal justice and court fees

=== Sexual risk orders ===
The Act also created sexual risk orders, which can require suspects to give police advanced notification of intention to engage in sexual activities or face prison sentences. The SROs, requested by police, are issued by magistrates.

=== Forced marriage ===
The Act also created several new offences relating to forced marriage:

- breaching a forced marriage protection order (amendment to the Family Law Act 1996)
- causing a forced marriage, i.e. using threats, violence or other coercion (not necessarily against the victim) to cause a person to marry without their full and free consent (or any person who lacks capacity to consent even without coercion)
- using deception to cause a person to leave the UK to enter into a forced marriage.

The latter two offences are defined separately for England and Wales and for Scotland. They apply to any marriage ceremony even if not legally binding.

== Amendments of the Extradition Act 2003 ==
This bill also added a very important limitation to European Arrest Warrants, barring extradition in the "absence of prosecution decision" if there are reasonable grounds to believe, that the competent authorities in the country requesting the extradition have not made a decision to charge or have not made a decision to try the suspect. This amendment became famously known as "Lex Assange", because Julian Assange in fact never got charged in Sweden, but UK's highest courts still decided the extradition request to be legal.

== Criticisms of the Act ==
A general criticism of the Act was it interfered with the rights of young people, making them feel unable to use public places as they wished, even if their behaviour and activities were lawful.

== See also ==
- Anti-social Behaviour Act 2003
- Sexual Offences Act 2003
- Chav/ned
- Criminal behaviour order
- Presumption of guilt
- Quality-of-life policing
