= Drugs Act 2005 =

Act of the Parliament of the United Kingdom

Drugs Act 2005 (Note: Section 24(1).)
- Act of Parliament
- Parliament of the United Kingdom
- Long title: An Act to make provision in connection with controlled drugs and for the making of orders to supplement anti-social behaviour orders in cases where behaviour is affected by drug misuse or other prescribed factors.
- Citation: 2005 c. 17
- Territorial extent: England and Wales, except that so far as it amends or repeals any enactment, this Act has the same extent as the enactment amended or repealed. (Note: Section 24(6)–(7).)

Dates
- Royal assent: 7 April 2005
- Commencement: Various (Note: Section 24(2)–(4).)
Other legislation
Amends	Misuse of Drugs Act 1971; Police and Criminal Evidence Act 1984; Criminal Justice Act 1988; Police and Criminal Evidence (Northern Ireland) Order 1989; Criminal Justice and Court Services Act 2000; Criminal Justice and Police Act 2001; Anti-social Behaviour Act 2003; Criminal Justice Act 2003
Amended by	Policing and Crime Act 2009; Anti-social Behaviour, Crime and Policing Act 2014; Sentencing Act 2020

Status: Amended

Text of statute as originally enacted

Revised text of statute as amended

The Drugs Act 2005 (Note: Section 24(1).) (c. 17) is an act of the Parliament of the United Kingdom relating to drugs offences.

== Provisions ==
Under the act, people caught with a certain quantity of drugs are automatically presumed to be supplying, rather than the lesser charge of possession.

The act allows first-time offenders testing positive for drugs to be obliged to attend a mandatory drug assessment specialist workers and receive help into treatment even if not charged.

Under the act, all adults arrested for 'trigger' crimes, including robbery, burglary and prostitution, which could have been committed to buy drugs, are to be tested for narcotics.

Those who test positive for a Class A drug may be required to take part in an assessment and also a follow-up assessment.

=== Section 24 - Short title, commencement and extent ===
The following orders have been made under section 24(3):

- The Drugs Act 2005 (Commencement No. 1) Order 2005 (S.I. 2005/1650 (C. 68))
- The Drugs Act 2005 (Commencement No. 2) Order 2005 (S.I. 2005/2223 (C. 93))
- The Drugs Act 2005 (Commencement No. 3) Order 2005 (S.I. 2005/3053 (C. 128))
- The Drugs Act 2005 (Commencement No. 4) Order 2006 (S.I. 2006/2136 (C. 71))
- The Drugs Act 2005 (Commencement No. 5) Order 2007] (S.I. 2007/562 (C. 23))
