= Dogs (Fouling of Land) Act 1996 =

Act of the Parliament of the United Kingdom

Dogs (Fouling of Land) Act 1996 (Note: Section 8(1).)
- Act of Parliament
- Parliament of the United Kingdom
- Long title: An Act to make provision with respect to the fouling of land by dogs.
- Citation: 1996 c. 20
- Territorial extent: England and Wales (Note: Section 8(3).)

Dates
- Royal assent: 17 June 1996
- Commencement: 17 August 1996 (Note: Section 8(2).)
- Repealed: 6 April 2006 (England); 15 March 2007 (Wales); (Note: The Clean Neighbourhoods and Environment Act 2005 (Commencement No.1, Transitional and Savings Provisions) (England) Order 2006 (SI 2006/795), the Clean Neighbourhoods and Environment Act 2005 (Commencement No. 2, Transitional Provisions and Savings) (Wales) Order 2006 (SI 2006/2797) and the Statutory Nuisances (Miscellaneous Provisions) (Wales) Order 2007 (SI 2007/120).)
Other legislation
| Repealed by | Clean Neighbourhoods and Environment Act 2005 |

Status: Repealed

Text of statute as originally enacted

Revised text of statute as amended

The Dogs (Fouling of Land) Act 1996 (c. 20) was an act of the Parliament of the United Kingdom. The purpose of the act was to create a criminal offence if a dog defecates at any time on designated land and a person who is in charge of the dog at that time fails to remove the faeces from the land forthwith.

It was repealed by Clean Neighbourhoods and Environment Act 2005 section 65, and replaced by similar legislation in the same act. The act applied only in England and Wales. It was not regulated in Scotland until the passing of the Dog Fouling (Scotland) Act 2003.

Some exemptions are in place for land beside a major road, agricultural land or forestry. Local authorities were to be responsible for policing the act, and are able to appoint officers to enforce the regulations. Conviction would lead to a fine.

== Provisions ==
Section 1 of the act applied it to land which is open to the air and to which the public are entitled or permitted to have access, with or without payment. It did not apply to land comprised in or running alongside a highway with a carriageway, unless the speed limit on the carriageway was 40 miles per hour or less, to land used for agriculture or woodlands, to land which is predominantly marshland, moor or heath, or to most common land. The person entitled to exercise powers under a private act to regulate land could exclude the application of the act to that land by notice to the local authority.

Section 2 allowed a local authority to designate by order any land in its area to which the act applied, either specifically or by description, and required the Secretary of State to prescribe by regulations the form and procedure of such orders, including publicity. Section 3 made it an offence, punishable on summary conviction by a fine not exceeding level 3 on the standard scale, if a dog defecated on designated land and the person in charge of it failed to remove the faeces forthwith, unless that person had a reasonable excuse or the person in control of the land had consented. Being unaware of the defecation, or not having a device for removing the faeces, was not a reasonable excuse, and the section did not apply to a person registered as blind. Section 4 allowed an authorised officer of a local authority to offer a fixed penalty in place of prosecution, applying subsections (2) to (8) of section 88 of the Environmental Protection Act 1990.

Section 5 provided for orders and regulations of the Secretary of State to be made by statutory instrument, subject to annulment. Section 6 provided that byelaws making it an offence to permit a dog to defecate on, or to fail to remove its faeces from, designated land ceased to have effect there, and that any other such byelaws ceased to have effect in relation to land to which the act applied at the end of ten years from its commencement. Section 7 defined "local authority", and section 8 provided the short title, brought the act into force at the end of the period of two months beginning with the day on which it was passed, and extended it to England and Wales only.

== Subsequent developments ==
The whole act was repealed by section 65 of, and part 5 of schedule 5 to, the Clean Neighbourhoods and Environment Act 2005, in England with effect from 6 April 2006 and in Wales with effect from 15 March 2007.

== See also ==
- Dogs Act

== Bibliography ==
- Wells, D. L. (2006). Factors influencing owners' reactions to their dogs' fouling. Environ Behav; 38:707–14.
