= Public spaces protection order =

Orders which ban specific acts in a designated geographical area in England and Wales

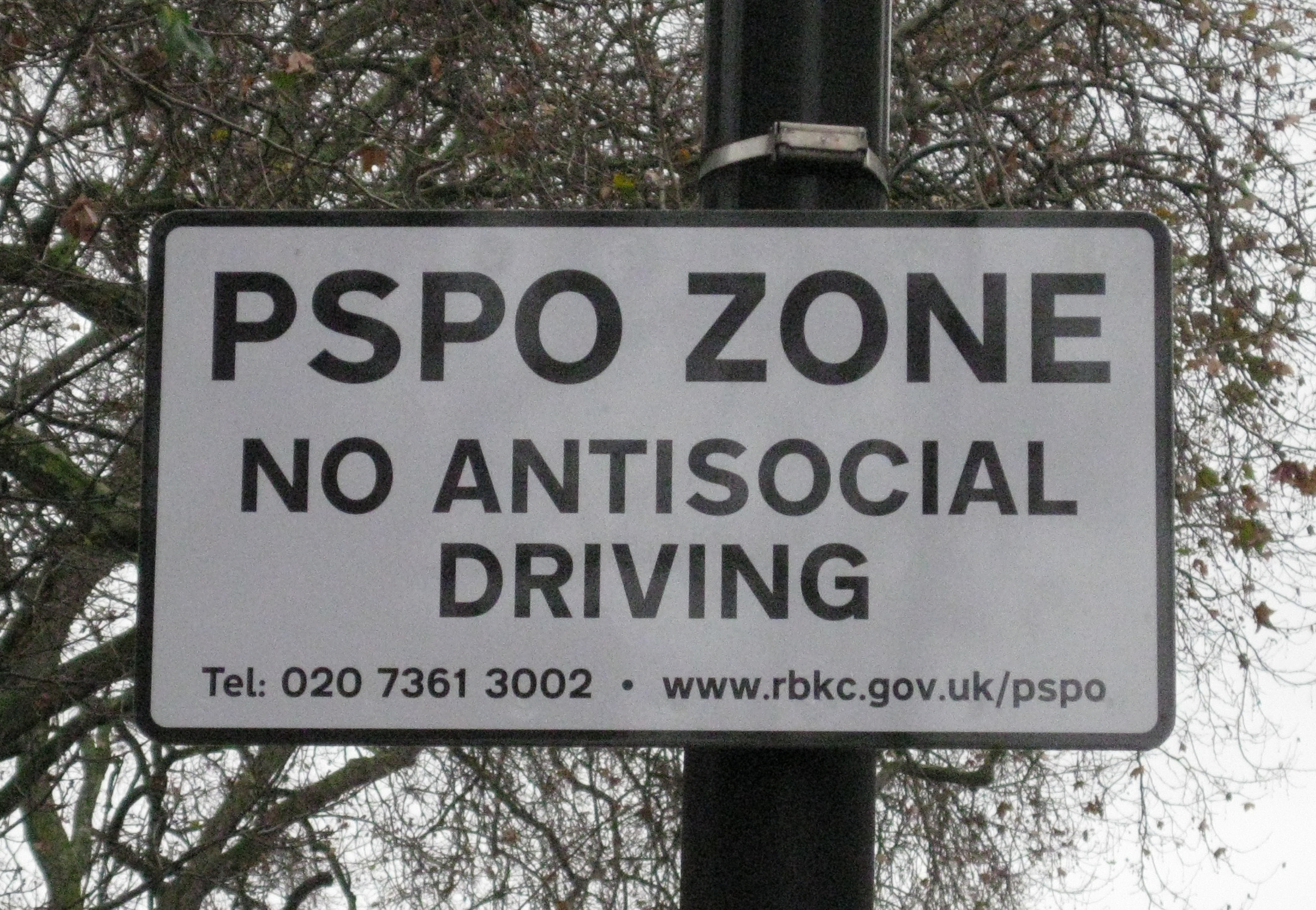
PSPO warning sign in Knightsbridge, London

Public spaces protection orders (PSPOs) are orders under the Anti-social Behaviour, Crime and Policing Act 2014 which ban specific acts in a designated geographical area in England and Wales as set out in the act. They replace the earlier designated public place orders, gating orders and dog control orders.

== Application ==
PSPOs are intended to prevent specific acts which would not otherwise be criminal offences. They have been criticised as restricting freedoms and having a disproportionately severe effect on people below the poverty line.

As of December 2017, there were 388 active PSPOs in Wales alone. Research by The Manifesto Club found that PSPO-related fixed penalty notices rose from 13,443 in 2022 to 19,162 in 2023, an increase of roughly 42% year-on-year, continuing a broader upward trend in enforcement. In 2023, 19,162 fixed penalty notices were issued under PSPO-related enforcement across 298 local authorities in England and Wales, with enforcement heavily concentrated in a small number of councils, while a large number issued none. A significant proportion of PSPO enforcement is carried out through private enforcement contractors paid per issued fine, with critics arguing this increases enforcement intensity.

== Challenging PSPOs ==
PSPOs can be challenged within six weeks of the order being issued on the grounds that the local authority does not have the power to issue the order, or that the legislation related to PSPOs has not been followed. The challenge must be made by a person who lives in the area or regularly visits it or, alternatively, a challenge can be made by any person charged with this offence. PSPOs must be renewed every three years. PSPOs have also been challenged through judicial review.

A PSPO placing restrictions on dog-walking was challenged via judicial review issued in Richmond upon Thames resulting in orders related to causing annoyance and damage to council property being removed. This affirmed the principle that PSPOs are intended to target antisocial rather than annoying behaviours.

== Government guidance ==
The issue of PSPOs is covered by the Anti-social Behaviour, Crime and Policing Act 2014. The Home Office issues guidance for their use. In the case of limiting the walking of dogs councils are encouraged to publish lists of alternative dog walking locations and should consider whether such alternatives exist. Councils are advised that it is important to not restrict sociability in public places, and that a broad range of the public should be free to gather, talk and play games.

== Examples of use of PSPO powers ==
PSPOs have been introduced to apply to a wide variety of issues.

Examples include:

- Salford City Council introduced a PSPO covering Salford Quays, which bans acts including using foul and abusive language. This has been interpreted as a response to football fans.
- Royal Borough of Kensington and Chelsea introduced a PSPO "to address the excessive level of noise nuisance, annoyance, danger or risk or harm or injury caused by motor vehicles to members of the public" in Knightsbridge.
- Peterborough City Council introduced a PSPO to ban littering, spitting and cycling in specific roads in the centre of Peterborough.
- Kettering Borough Council enacted a curfew banning individuals under 18 from going outside alone between 11pm and 6am.
- Ealing London Borough Council approved a PSPO in April 2018 which protected the area around a Marie Stopes International Reproductive Choices clinic. This banned anti-abortion campaigners from approaching and interacting with patients. The so-called buffer zone or safe access zone was approved after years of campaigning by a grassroots activist group called Sister Supporter.
- In 2022, Redbridge Council used a PSPO to fine a man for sexual harassment, in the first example of such a use of the PSPO powers.
- In December 2022, a PSPO was used to arrest a Wolverhampton priest, Isabel Vaughan-Spruce, for praying on the street outside an abortion clinic. When approached by police, Vaughan-Spruce claimed she was praying "in her head" and she was charged with "protesting and engaging in an act that is intimidating to service users". Charges against Vaughan-Spruce were dropped in February 2023 and she received a payout of £13,000 from West Midlands Police in August 2024, however in October 2024 a new addition to the Public Order Act 2023 was made, creating "buffer zones" outside abortion clinics across England and Wales.

== Proposals to use PSPOs to ban rough sleeping ==
In 2015, Hackney Council attempted to introduce a PSPO which would have banned rough sleeping. A similar ban was proposed in Newport. The Home Office guidance for PSPOs states that PSPOs should not be used to prevent homelessness and rough sleeping.

== See also ==
- Byelaw
