= Anti-social behaviour order =

Type of civil order made in the United Kingdom

An anti-social behaviour order (ASBO /ˈæzboʊ/) is a civil order made in the United Kingdom against a person who had been shown, on the balance of evidence, to have engaged in anti-social behaviour. The orders were introduced by Prime Minister Tony Blair in 1998, and continued in use until abolished in England and Wales by the Anti-Social Behaviour, Crime and Policing Act 2014 on 20 October 2014— although they continue to be used in Scotland and Northern Ireland. ASBOs were replaced in England and Wales by the civil injunctions and criminal behaviour orders. They were designed to address behaviours like intimidation, drunkenness, and violence by individuals and families, using civil orders rather than criminal sanctions. The orders restricted behaviour in some way, such as prohibiting a return to a certain area or shop, or restricting public behaviours such as swearing or drinking alcohol. Many saw the ASBOs as connected with young delinquents.

== History ==
ASBOs were introduced in England, Scotland, and Wales through the Crime and Disorder Act 1998 and in Northern Ireland by The Anti-social Behaviour (Northern Ireland) Order 2004. Later legislation strengthened its application: in England and Wales, this was largely via the Anti-social Behaviour Act 2003 and in Scotland with the Antisocial and Sexual Behaviour etc. (Scotland) Act 2004. Scotland, however, had a pre-existing tribunal system charged with dealing with children and young persons who offend, the Children's Hearings system.

In a press release of 28 October 2004, Tony Blair and David Blunkett announced further measures to extend the use and definition of ASBOs. The remit included:

- Extension of the Witness Protection Programme in anti-social behaviour cases
- More courts dealing with cases
- More offences, including dog-fouling, litter, graffiti, and night-time noise liable for fixed penalty notices
- Giving parish councils the power to issue fixed penalty notices for infringements

The press release concluded by remarking:

In the past year, around 100,000 cases of anti-social behaviour have been dealt with. 2,633 ASBOs and 418 dispersal orders have been issued in the same period.

On 25 October 2005, Transport for London announced its intent to apply for a new law giving them the authority to issue orders against repeat fare dodgers, and increased fines. By 31 March 2004, 2,455 ASBOs had been issued in England and Wales. On 30 March 2006, the Home Office announced that 7,356 ASBOs had been given out since 1999 in England and Wales.

=== Replacement ===
The 2010 coalition government expressed its intention to replace ASBOs, citing the reasons that "breach rates are high, and the number issued has been steadily declining since 2005." In July 2010, Home Secretary Theresa May announced her intention to reform anti-social behaviour measures for England and Wales, with the abolition of ASBOs in due course in favour of alternative "community-based" social control policies. However, in 2012, Liberal Democrat objections prevented the implementation of proposals in a Home Office White Paper to replace the ASBO with a "criminal behaviour order" and a "crime prevention injunction". In May 2013, an Anti-social Behaviour, Crime and Policing Bill was introduced into the House of Commons, including a provision to create "injunctions to prevent nuisance and annoyance", replacing ASBOs in England and Wales. The bill was criticised for the broad and undefined scope of "nuisance and annoyance", and was rejected by the House of Lords in January 2014.

The Anti-Social Behaviour, Crime and Policing Act 2014 received Royal Assent in March 2014. This streamlined the tools available to tackle anti-social behaviour, and replaced the ASBO with an injunction (a civil order) and a criminal behaviour order (CBO) in England and Wales.

== What warrants an ASBO ==
=== Uses ===
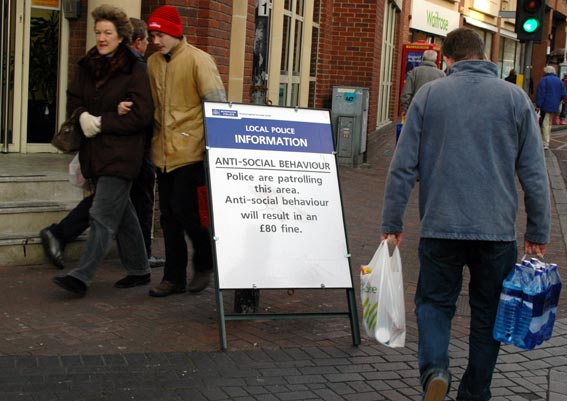
A police notice on the street in Richmond

An ASBO can be issued in response to "conduct which caused or was likely to cause harm, harassment, alarm, or distress, to one or more persons not of the same household as him or herself, and where an ASBO is seen as necessary to protect relevant persons from further anti-social acts by the defendant." In England and Wales, they were issued by magistrates' courts; they are issued in Scotland by the sheriff courts and in Northern Ireland by magistrates' courts.

The British government introduced ASBOs through the Crime and Disorder Act 1998. In the UK, a CRASBO was a "criminally related" ASBO. One local authority published photos of those given ASBOs on an Internet site. Anti-social behaviour included a range of behaviours, such as:

- abandoning cars
- arson
- begging
- casteism
- dangerous driving
- defecating/urinating in public
- disturbing the peace
- dogging (exhibitionistic public sex)
- drug dealing/consumption of controlled recreational drugs
- drunken behaviour
- fare evasion
- intimidation
- littering/fly tipping/dog fouling
- loitering (with intent)
- noise pollution
- paedophilic activity
- racism and xenophobia
- rioting
- rudeness
- spitting
- stealing/mugging/shoplifting
- urban exploration
- vandalism/criminal damage/graffiti

=== Standard of proof ===
Applications for ASBOs were heard by magistrates sitting in their civil capacity. Although the proceedings were civil, the court had to apply a heightened civil standard of proof. This standard was virtually indistinguishable from the criminal standard. The applicant had to satisfy the court "so that it is sure" that the defendant has acted in an anti-social manner. The test for the court to be "satisfied so that it is sure" was the same direction that a judge gives to a jury in a criminal case heard in the Crown Court, and is also known as satisfying the court "beyond reasonable doubt".

Pursuant to section 1(1) Civil Evidence Act 1995, an applicant (and a defendant) had the right to rely on witness statements without calling the makers of those statements—known as hearsay. If a party proposed to rely upon a hearsay statement, then the other party was entitled to ask the court for permission to call that witness for cross-examination.

Section 4(1) Civil Evidence Act 1995 states that:

In estimating the weight (if any) to be given to hearsay evidence in civil proceedings, the court shall have regard to any circumstances from which any inference can reasonably be drawn as to the reliability or otherwise of the evidence.

The High Court has emphasised that the use of the words "if any" shows that some hearsay evidence may be given no weight at all. For an ASBO to be made, the applicant had to prove beyond all reasonable doubt that the respondent had behaved in an anti-social manner. The applicant could rely on hearsay evidence. However, the Court of Appeal has stated that it does not expect a court to find that the criminal standard has been reached by relying solely on hearsay evidence. The Civil Evidence Act 1995 itself makes clear that courts should consider what weight, if any at all, it attaches to hearsay material. In Cleary, the Court of Appeal again restated that courts need to be cautious of hearsay evidence.

=== Typical ASBOs ===
An ASBO was an order of the court which told an individual aged over 10 years how they must not behave.

An order could contain only negative prohibitions. It could not contain a positive obligation. To obtain an ASBO, a two-stage test had to be satisfied by the applicant authority (see: s.1(1) Crime and Disorder Act 1998). The first test was that the defendant had committed acts causing or likely to cause harassment, alarm, or distress within six months of the date of issue of the summons. The second test was that an order was necessary to protect persons from further anti-social behaviour.

The applicant had to satisfy the court that the individual had acted in an anti-social manner—that is to say, in a manner that caused, or was likely to cause, harassment, alarm, or distress to one or more persons not of the same household as themself. A court could order an ASBO only if such an order was "necessary". Further, each prohibited act would usually be an act preparatory to a criminal offence, rather than the offence itself—but not always (see: Rabess v Commissioner of Police of the Metropolis [2007] EWHC 208 (Admin)). In addition, each prohibition itself had to be necessary.

An order had to be tailored for the individual defendant. The ASBO represented "a form of personalised criminal law." It had to be relevant to the particular anti-social behaviour. Orders needed to be simple, precise and proportionate. Each prohibition had to be necessary. In R v Boness, stipulations regarding not harassing, causing alarm or distress to any person, and not carrying packaged, bagged or wrapped goods (except food), in public in certain circumstances, were struck down due to their lack of precision and complexity.

An ASBO was very similar to a civil injunction, even though the differences are important. First: the injunction was supposed to protect the world at large, in a given geographical area, rather than an individual. Second: breach of an ASBO was a criminal offence to be tried in a criminal court, applying the criminal standard of beyond all reasonable doubt. A power of committal to prison was available for breach of a civil injunction, but a court was unlikely to exercise that power. A person subject to an anti-social behaviour order where it did not follow a criminal conviction had an automatic right of appeal against both the making of the order and its terms to a higher court. There was also the availability of an appeal to the High Court by way of "case stated". There was no appeal against the variation of orders.

An application for an ASBO was considered by the courts in its civil jurisdiction, and was a civil order. However, breach of an ASBO was a criminal offence, and conviction could result in up to five years' imprisonment (two for a minor). Subsequent legislation compelled magistrates to make a Parenting Order, where a person under the age of 16 breached their ASBO.

Other examples:

- Begging
- Flyposting
- Harassment
- Organising illegal raves
- Suicide attempts
- Theft
- Vandalism

=== Uncommon ASBOs ===
Unconventional uses of ASBOs, as listed by a report to the Home Office to illustrate the broad applicability of the civil order, include:

- Two teenage boys from east Manchester forbidden to wear one golf glove, as it was a symbol of membership of a particular gang.
- A 13-year-old forbidden to use the word "grass" as a term of abuse in order to threaten people.
- A 15-year-old forbidden to play football in his street.
- A farmer (the first to be given an ASBO) who was instructed to keep his geese and pigs from damaging his neighbour's property.
- An 18-year-old ordered not to congregate with three or more other youths. He entered a local youth club that had a good reputation, and was arrested because there were more than three youths on the premises. He was intending to attend an event there on how to deal with anti-social behaviour.

== Ireland ==
The Republic of Ireland implemented an ASBO system in 2007. Breaches of ASBOs can lead to a fine of up to 3000 euros or a prison sentence of up to six months. As of 2012 only seven had been issued but in 2020 alone thirty were issued.

== Reception ==
From their inception, ASBOs were controversial. They were criticised as being "without strong and principled justification", a distraction from the failure of the government's law and order policies, a "recipe for institutionalised vigilantism", and an "emblem of punitive populism". Andrew Rutherford commented that the "ASBO provides a particularly striking example of the criminalisation of social policy". A MORI opinion poll published on 9 June 2005 found that 82% of the British public were in favour of ASBOs; however, only 39% believed they were effective in their current form. A 2012 survey by Angus Reid Public Opinion showed that only 8% of Britons believed ASBOs had been successful in curbing anti-social behaviour in the UK.

Other parties voiced concerns about the open-ended nature of ASBO penalties—that is, there was little restriction on what a court was able to impose as the terms of the ASBO, and little restriction on what could be designated as antisocial behaviour. In 2005, critics reported that around 3% of ASBO applications had been turned down. In July 2007, the Local Government Ombudsman published a report criticising Manchester City Council for serving an ASBO based purely on uncorroborated reports of nuisance by a neighbour, and the Council agreed to pay £2000 in compensation.

A 2005 memorandum submitted by the National Association of Probation Officers (NAPO) asserted that "there is ample evidence of the issuing of ASBOs by the courts being inconsistent and almost a geographical lottery. There is great concern that people are being jailed following the breach of an ASBO, where the original offence was itself non-imprisonable. There is also evidence that ASBOs have been used where people have mental health problems where treatment would be more appropriate. In NAPO's view, the time is right for a fundamental review of the use and appropriateness of Anti-social Behaviour Orders by the Home Office."

In 2002, Home Office data stated that in the cases where information was available, there was a high proportion where some mitigating factor appeared to have contributed to their behaviour. Almost 1/5 used substances, and 1/6 were consuming excessive amounts of alcohol. Overall, 44% were engaging in substance use or had a learning disability, and a further 16% included persons with psychological and behaviour problems in the family. Similar results were found in Scotland. A casefile review showed that 55% of those given ASBOs had substance use disorders, mental health, or learning disability problems.

ASBO effectiveness was also questioned. In response to a House of Commons question, it was stated that 53.7% of ASBOs were breached in England in 2005; 69.4% in 2006; and 70.3% in 2007. In large cities, rates could be higher: the breach rate in Manchester reached 90.2% in 2007. This level of breaching raised an interesting issue. The first test to justify the issuing of an ASBO was that anti-social behaviour (ASB) had been proved to the criminal standard. The second test was that the order was necessary to prevent future acts of ASB, and provide protection to the victim(s). However, the criminal standard was not applied to the second test. Lord Steyn stated:

The inquiry under section 1(1)(b), namely that such an order is necessary to protect persons from further anti-social acts by him, does not involve a standard of proof: it is an exercise of judgment or evaluation.

— Lord Steyn, R (on the application of McCann) v. Manchester Crown Court [2003] 1 AC 787, 812 (House of Lords), para 37

According to government evaluations (e.g. Housing Research Summary No. 230; DfCLG) in the "ASB Intensive Family Support" (Sin Bin) projects introduced to supplement ASBOs, 80% of the families targeted had serious mental/physical health and learning disability problems; one in five families had children affected with attention deficit hyperactivity disorder, and 60% of the families were recognised as victims of ASB. Project managers described many families as "easily scapegoated" in neighbour disputes. HRS 230 called for a review of both ASBO policy and investigation procedures in order to make the whole process fairer.

A later study of 53 projects by the National Centre For Social Research noted that 42% of children with mental health problems were reported to have ADHD or hyperactivity, and 29% were reported with depression or stress. Amongst adults, 69% had depression.

In the UK, there was criticism that an ASBO was sometimes viewed as a badge of honour by the youth.

Nacro, the biggest criminal justice-related charity in England and Wales, published two reports: the first claimed that ASBOs were a failure, due to being costly and slow to obtain; and the second criticised their use by the courts, with assertions that they were being used too hastily, before alternatives had been tried.

== See also ==
- 101 Non-Emergency Number
- Acceptable behaviour contract
- Antisocial personality disorder
- Control order
- Disorderly conduct
- Football hooliganism
- Gang injunction
- Lawburrows
- Peace bond (Canada)
- Restraining order (US)
- Social justice
- Youth justice in England and Wales
