= Mischief =

Class of criminal offense

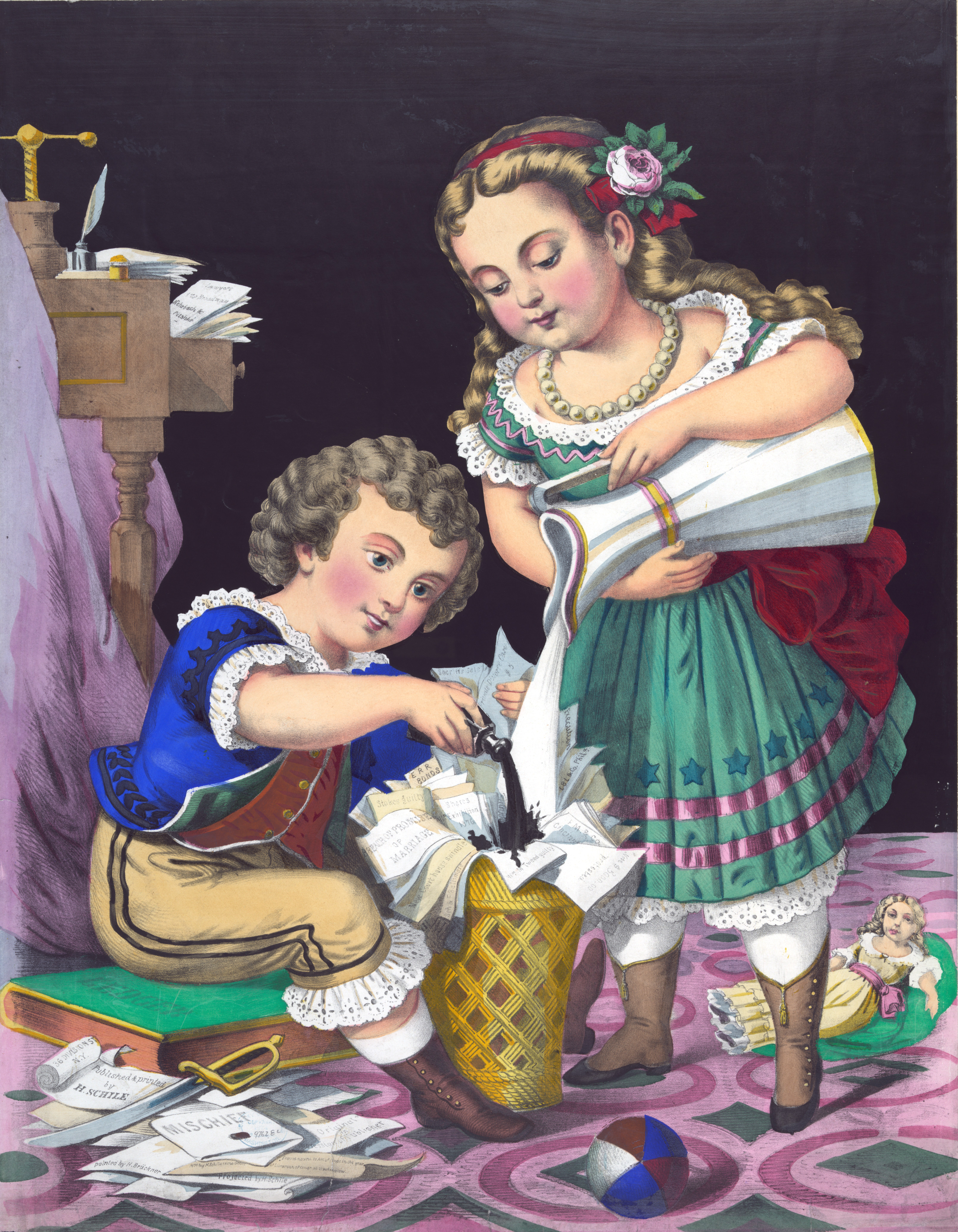
H. Brückner, Mischief (1874)

The more common use of mischief is an “action or conduct that annoys or vexes; esp., such as may cause trivial evil, annoyance, or trouble to others” - Webster’s International Dictionary (second edition).

Mischief (or malicious mischief) is a class of criminal offenses that are defined differently in different legal jurisdictions. While the wrongful acts will often involve what is popularly described as vandalism, there can be a legal differentiation between vandalism and mischief. The etymology of the word comes from Old French meschief, which means "misfortune", from meschever, "to end badly".

== Canada ==
The country's Criminal Code makes mischief a hybrid offence, punishable by up to and including life imprisonment if the mischief causes actual danger to human life. Public mischief is the term for the crime of wasting police time.

== Scotland ==
Malicious mischief is an offence against the common law of Scotland. It does not require actual damage to property for the offence to be committed; financial damage consequential to the act is sufficient. It has now largely been replaced by vandalism, a statutory offense with the same definition. Vandalism is defined by section 52 of the Criminal Law (Consolidation) (Scotland) Act 1995.

== United States ==
In United States criminal law, mischief is an offense against property that typically involves the intentional or reckless infliction of damage, defacement, alteration, or destruction of property. Common forms include vandalism and graffiti. Some examples include: disturbing a grave site, damaging an automobile, damaging or stealing a sign, starting a fire, throwing eggs at a home or car (egging), and interfering with a fire hose. Governed by state law, criminal mischief is committed when a perpetrator, having no right to do so nor any reasonable ground to believe that he/she has such a right, intentionally or recklessly damages property of another person, intentionally participates in the destruction of property of another person, or participates in the reckless damage or destruction of property of another person.

== See also ==
- Criminal damage in English law
- Property damage
