= Acceptable behaviour contract =

British anti-social behaviour intervention

In the United Kingdom, an Acceptable Behaviour Contract (ABC) is an early intervention with individuals who are perceived to be engaging in anti-social behaviour. Though they may be used against adults, almost all ABCs concern young people between the ages of 10-18. In the case of a breach of contract or the continuation of unacceptable behavior an Anti-social behaviour order may be used.

== History ==
Anti-social behaviour orders were introduced in April 1999 under the terms of the Crime and Disorder Act 1998. The legislation was amended by the Police Reform Act 2002. ABCs were first used in Islington in the early 2000s.

== Process ==
An Acceptable Behaviour Contract (ABC) is an agreement between an individual who has taken part in antisocial behavior and a local agency. The contract is a voluntary document that is agreed to by both parties and signed. ABCs are not legal documents.

Contract

An ABC is individually drawn up for each person. The contract contains a list of anti-social behaviours as terms, as well as consequences should the terms be breached. Anti-social behavior contracts are typically six months in length, although other lengths of time can be used.

Examples of terms:

I will not:

- damage property
- verbally abuse passersby
- write graffiti
- throw stones or other objects
- congregate in groups
- climb on public or private property
- spit
- smoke in public
- set fire to things
- physically harass people
- damage the environment
- smash glass
- damage cars

Consequences of Breaches

ABCs are executed generally following two warnings. As part of an ABC, signers are asked to recognise that a breach may result in further consequences. ABCs are not legally binding, although an ABC breach is often used as evidence to support an application for an Anti-Social Behaviour Order (ASBO), a breach of which is a criminal offence. If the ASBO is breached, offenders may face imprisonment of up to 5 years and/or a fine of up to £2,000.

== See also ==
- Anti-Social Behaviour Order
