= Sister Supporter =

British abortion advocacy group

Sister Supporter are a British advocacy group who campaign for the introduction of buffer zones around abortion clinics. The group also runs a hotline to gather information about harassment by anti-abortion protestors outside of clinics.

== History ==
The group was founded in late-2015 in Ealing, in response to harassment by anti-abortion campaigners outside of the local MSI Reproductive Choices clinic. In 2018, after two years of campaigning, the group successfully got the local authority to introduce a buffer zone using a public spaces protection order, the first buffer zone to be implemented in the UK. Following implementation of the buffer zone, reported cases of harassment against the clinic's staff and patients dropped significantly.

In 2020, the group successfully campaigned for the introduction of a buffer zone in Fallowfield, Manchester.

In July 2022, the Bournemouth, Christchurch and Poole Council announced that it would be launching a public consultation on introducing a buffer zone around the Bournemouth British Pregnancy Advisory Service clinic following a campaign by the local Sister Supporter branch, including a petition that received over 4000 signatures.

In October 2022, MPs voted in favour of national buffer zone legislation which Ealing group Sister Supporter said will help woman to not receive “anti-choice intimidation and harassment at abortion clinics across England and Wales.”
