= Fixed penalty notice =

Financial penalty issued for a minor offence

In the United Kingdom, a fixed penalty notice (FPN) is a notice giving an individual the opportunity to be made immune from prosecution for an alleged criminal offence in exchange for a fee. Fixed penalty notices were introduced in Britain in the 1980s to deal with minor parking offences. Originally used by police and traffic wardens, their use has extended to other public officials and authorities, as has the range of offences for which they can be used.

In recent years, this has taken the form of using them to give police and public authorities in England, Scotland and Wales a realistic weapon against anti-social behaviour. They are designed to reduce paperwork on police and council officers by allowing low-level anti-social behaviour to be dealt with on the spot. Newer types of notice exist for disorder, environmental crime, truancy and noise. A fixed penalty notice is not a fine or criminal conviction because of the distinction that the recipient can opt for the matter to be dealt with in court instead of paying. However, if the recipient neither pays the penalty nor opts for a court hearing in the time specified, it may then be enforced by the normal methods used to enforce unpaid fines, including imprisonment in some circumstances.

Civil penalties such as penalty charge notices (PCNs) are similar legal constructs used for issuing on-the-spot fines. Unlike FPNs, civil penalties have an assumption of "guilty until proven innocent" with a burden being placed on the individual to appeal the fine. Civil penalties can be issued for property violations, tax code violations or illegal employment. The appeal processes for PCNs tend to operate through tribunals.

== History ==
FPNs were originally introduced for parking and motoring offences by part III of the Transport Act 1982 (replaced by the Road Traffic Act 1988); in many areas this style of enforcement has been taken over from police by local authorities. The Criminal Justice and Police Act 2001, which came into force in 2003, introduced fixed penalty notices, sometimes referred to as on-the-spot fines, for being drunk and disorderly and making hoax emergency calls.

FPNs are also issued in Hong Kong by the Hong Kong Police Force.

== Examples ==
=== Penalty charge notices (parking and motoring offences) ===
Other than parking, motoring offences can also be dealt with by the issue of FPNs by police, officers of the Driver and Vehicle Standards Agency or local authority personnel. A penalty notice issued by local authority parking attendants is a civil penalty backed with powers to obtain payment by civil action and is defined as a penalty charge notice (PCN), distinguishing it from other FPNs which are often backed with a power of criminal prosecution if the penalty is not paid; in the latter case the "fixed penalty" is sometimes designated as a "mitigated penalty" to indicate the avoidance of being prosecuted which it provides.

If a PCN is paid within 14 days of the 28-day period, the charge is decreased by 50%. Appealing against or contesting a PCN requires going through a formal process: if lost, the 50% period pay could be extended. To appeal a PCN normally an informal appeal is made to the body that issued the ticket, if not an appeal may be made to adjudicating bodies created according to the Traffic Management Act 2004, and finally this body's decisions can be challenged by judicial review.

The appeals process for PCNs follows a two-stage structure. The first stage is an informal challenge to the local authority that issued the ticket; these are usually made within the 14-day discount period, and the Secretary of State's statutory guidance recommends that an authority which rejects a challenge made in that window should consider re-offering the discount for a further 14 days. If the informal challenge is rejected, the motorist receives a notice to owner and may make formal representations on the nine statutory grounds set out in regulation 5(4) of the Civil Enforcement of Road Traffic Contraventions (Representations and Appeals) (England) Regulations 2022. The authority then has 56 days, beginning with the date it receives the representations, to consider them and serve a decision notice; if it fails to do so it is deemed to have accepted the representations, and must cancel the notice and refund any payment. Guidance on the grounds that succeed against a council PCN, and the evidence each one requires, is published by third-party sources.

PCNs should not be confused with parking charge notices, the latter, being issued by private landowners seeking to impose a charge for parking on private land.

==== Enforcement of unpaid penalty charge notices ====
Where a penalty charge remains unpaid and no appeal is outstanding, the enforcement authority may serve a charge certificate, which increases the penalty by 50%. If the increased amount is still not paid, the authority may register the debt with the Traffic Enforcement Centre at the County Court Business Centre in Northampton, after which it is enforceable as though it were an order of the county court, though the contravention itself remains a civil matter and no criminal conviction results. An order for recovery is then served on the registered keeper. The recipient has 21 days from service to file a witness statement, form TE9, on a limited set of statutory grounds – the most commonly used being that the notice to owner was never received – and filing one cancels the registration and returns the case to the authority; a keeper who missed the deadline may apply on form TE7 for permission to file out of time. Where no witness statement is filed, the authority may obtain a warrant of control and instruct enforcement agents, whose fees are fixed by regulation and are added to the sum owed; this stage, rather than the original penalty, accounts for much of the eventual cost to the motorist.

=== Penalty notices for disorder ===
A penalty notice for disorder, PND, was defined in the Criminal Justice and Police Act 2001, based on the success of the 1998 anti-social behaviour order (ASBO).

Issued under Section 1–11 of the Criminal Justice and Police Act 2001 for public disorder offences and divided into "lower-tier" and "higher-tier" offences each with its own penalty amount, a penalty notice for disorder (PND) can only be issued to people aged 18 or over. There are 26 offences for which a notice can be issued, such as being drunk and disorderly in a public place, selling alcohol to a minor (under 18), threatening behaviour or language and "behaviour likely to cause harassment, alarm or distress to others". Penalty notices can also be issued for minor shop thefts and minor criminal damage and in January 2009 the offence of possession of cannabis was added to the scheme. Recipients have 21 days to pay the notice or request a court hearing. If a penalty notice is not paid after 21 days then the outstanding amount is increased by 50% and if it is still unpaid the fine is lodged at the local magistrates' court just as if the matter was an unpaid court fine. This is where PNDs and FPNs vary if they are not paid: the former results in an unpaid fine being lodged and the latter results in the recipient being summoned to court to answer for the original offence.

When paying PNDs, no admission of guilt is required. Paying the PND involves neither an official finding nor an acceptance of guilt and discharges all liability to conviction for the offence. PNDs for recordable offences are however recorded on the Police National Computer and may be disclosed on an Enhanced Criminal Records Disclosure issued by the Disclosure and Barring Service, if it is concluded that the behaviour leading to the PND was relevant to the matter at hand, for example, the applicant's suitability to work with children. However, the mere fact that a PND has been issued would not make it relevant.

PNDs are generally issued to first-time offenders with no previous record. PNDs do not constitute a criminal record; they are non-conviction information and treated as intelligence.

==== Experiments with juvenile PNDs ====
In some areas there was a pilot scheme, documented in November 2008, that allowed PNDs to be issued to 10- to 15-year-olds – the parent or guardian was liable for the penalty. The tariff was reduced, £40 for the higher-tier offences and £30 for the lower-tier offences. The police forces that piloted juvenile PNDs were:

- British Transport Police (Birmingham Division)
- Essex
- Lancashire
- Merseyside
- Metropolitan Police (Kingston Division)
- Nottinghamshire
- West Midlands

=== FPNs for environmental crime ===
FPNs are available as a means for dealing with various environmental crimes. The first was introduced in 1990 for leaving litter, and since then numerous others have followed, particularly as a result of the Anti-social Behaviour Act 2003, and the Clean Neighbourhoods and Environment Act 2005.

The majority of these are issued by local authority officers, but police and Environment Agency officers have been authorised to issue some. The penalty ranges from £20 for unnecessary idling of a stationary vehicle engine to £500 for failing to comply with a noise warning notice in licensed premises.

By far the majority of FPNs issued for environmental crimes are for leaving litter, failing to remove dog faeces, and fly posting. The government has determined that fly tipping is too serious to warrant a fixed penalty, and that cases should be referred to a magistrates' court.

Minor criminal damage such as graffiti may also be dealt with by issuing an FPN.

=== FPN for truancy ===
Section 23 of the Anti-social Behaviour Act 2003 allows local authorities, head teachers (or their deputies) and the police to issue a £50 or £100 FPN to a parent or parents who fail to ensure that their child regularly attends school.

The Education and Inspections Act 2006 came into force on 4 September 2007. Under this, parents of children excluded from school are required to keep them under supervision for the first five days of their exclusion. If the child is found in a public place without their parent during this time, the parent can be issued a £50 penalty notice, which rises to £100 if not paid in 28 days.

=== FPN for night noise ===
The Noise Act 1996 allows local authorities to investigate complaints from residents about excessive noise coming from a residential dwelling during the night (defined as between the hours of 11:00 pm and 7:00 am) and to issue fixed penalty notices.

=== FPN for breaches of COVID-19 restrictions ===
Regulations issued in 2020 introduced FPNs with penalties ranging from £30 to £10,000 for various violations of restrictions brought in to control the COVID-19 pandemic in the United Kingdom, including via the Health Protection Regulations 2020 and the COVID-19 local lockdown regulations. On 28 August 2020, The Health Protection Regulations 2020 statuary instrument, SI 907/202,0 increased the FPN in some cases, saying it "must be £10,000" in case an assembly of "more than thirty persons".

As of March 2022, 118,978 notices were issued in England and Wales. In Scotland, the most deprived 10% of neighbourhoods were 11.2 times more likely to receive an FPN than the least deprived 10%. National Police Chiefs’ Council statistics showed Black and Asian people received fines 1.8 times more than white people. Labour MP Harriet Harman, said it was clear that young people, ethnic minority people, men, also the most socially deprived, were at most at risk and poor people were criminalised rather than the better off. The Joint Committee on Human Rights said the application of FPNs was "muddled, discriminatory and unfair".

Some FPNs during the COVID-19 lockdown were wrongly issued. Of those where an individual declined to pay and were prosecuted in open court 25% were wrongly issued. Giving evidence to parliament barrister Kirsty Brimelow said it was likely that thousands of FPNs were incorrectly issued. In April 2021, The Justice Gap reported that it was estimated that 85,000 Covid-regulation-related FPNs had been issued and that a cross-party group of MPs and peers wanted each to be reviewed.

== Challenges to the enforceability of PCNs ==
The Bill of Rights 1689 creates legislation stating "all grants and promises of fines and forfeitures of particular persons before conviction are illegal and void". Since PCNs create fines before conviction, there have been attempts to challenge PCN legislation using the Bill of Rights 1689.

Robin de Crittenden sought a judicial review on these grounds in 2006. His request for judicial review was declined by Justice Collins on the grounds that PCNs are "not a fine or forfeiture within the meaning of the Bill of Rights" because what the Bill of Rights prevents is "a fine or a forfeiture in respect of which there is no right of appeal, whether ultimately to a court or through a system which is set up which is equivalent to a court." While maintaining that PCNs are compatible with the Bill of Rights, Collins commented that the clarity of legislation should be used as a factor when determining if new legislation is compatible with preexisting legislation: "If it passes an Act which clearly states something which could arguably be said to be contrary to a previous Act, then if it is clear and if there is no argument that can be raised against its clear meaning, it will prevail."

Case law created at a later date touches on the ability to impliedly repeal parts of the Bill of Rights. In Thoburn v Sunderland City Council, Lord Justice Laws, ruled that constitutional statutes could not be impliedly repealed ("Ordinary statutes may be impliedly repealed. Constitutional statutes may not. For the repeal of a constitutional Act or the abrogation of a fundamental right to be effected by statute, the court would apply this test: is it shown that the legislature's actual – not imputed, constructive or presumed – intention was to effect the repeal or abrogation?") stating that "the Magna Carta, the Bill of Rights 1689, the Act of Union, the Reform Acts [...], the HRA, the Scotland Act 1998 and the Government of Wales Act 1998" are examples of constitutional statutes.

The implications of the ruling of Thoburn v Sunderland City Council to the enforcement of civil penalties were, to some degree, tested in the First-tier Tribunal case Pendle v HMRC, though since First-tier Tribunal rulings are non-binding this decision would only be taken as advisory in any other court.

== Regional fixed penalty offices ==
There are three regional fixed penalty offices, in Morley, Leeds, covering the north of England, Loughborough, covering the Midlands and Wales, and Southend-on-Sea, covering the south of England.

== See also ==
- Anti-Social Behaviour, Crime and Policing Act 2014
- Community protection notice
- Presumption of guilt
- Traffic ticket and parking ticket for United States equivalents
