= Clean Neighbourhoods and Environment Act 2005 =

Act of the Parliament of the United Kingdom

Clean Neighbourhoods and Environment Act 2005 (Note: Section 111.)
- Act of Parliament
- Parliament of the United Kingdom
- Long title: An Act to amend section 6 of the Crime and Disorder Act 1998; to make provision for the gating of certain minor highways; to make provision in relation to vehicles parked on roads that are exposed for sale or being repaired; to make provision in relation to abandoned vehicles and the removal and disposal of vehicles; to make provision relating to litter and refuse, graffiti, fly-posting and the display of advertisements; to make provision relating to the transportation, collection, disposal and management of waste; to make provision relating to the control of dogs and to amend the law relating to stray dogs; to make provision in relation to noise; to provide for the Commission for Architecture and the Built Environment and for the making of grants relating to the quality of the built environment; to amend the law relating to abandoned shopping and luggage trolleys; to amend the law relating to statutory nuisances; to amend section 78L of the Environmental Protection Act 1990; to amend the law relating to offences under Schedule 1 to the Pollution Prevention and Control Act 1999; and for connected purposes.
- Citation: 2005 c. 16
- Territorial extent: England and Wales, except that an amendment in schedule 2 has the same extent as the provision amended and the repeal in Part 8 of Schedule 5 has the same extent as the provision repealed. (Note: Section 110.)

Dates
- Royal assent: 7 April 2005
- Commencement: Various (Note: Section 108.)
Other legislation
Amends	Dogs (Amendment) Act 1928; House of Commons Disqualification Act 1975; Refuse Disposal (Amenity) Act 1978; Town and Country Planning Act 1990; Environmental Protection Act 1990; Crime and Disorder Act 1998; Pollution Prevention and Control Act 1999
Repeals/revokes	Dogs (Fouling of Land) Act 1996
Amended by	Sentencing Act 2020

Status: Amended

Text of statute as originally enacted

Revised text of statute as amended

The Clean Neighbourhoods and Environment Act 2005 (c. 16) is an act of the Parliament of the United Kingdom relating to environmental crime.

== Background ==
The Local Government Association had persistently lobbied for greater powers relating to environmental crime.

== Provisions ==
The act specifies that smoke-related materials are litter, to allow greater enforcement.

The act requires that local authorities, chief police officers, police authorities, fire and rescue authorities and primary care trusts consider anti-social behaviour affecting the local environment.

The act gives local authorities relating to fly-tipping, litter, nuisance alleys, flyposting, graffiti, abandoned and nuisance vehicles, dogs, noise, and nuisance from artificial lighting.

In some cases fines can be issued by parish councils.

== Reception ==
The Local Government Association supported the legislation.
