= Designated public place order =

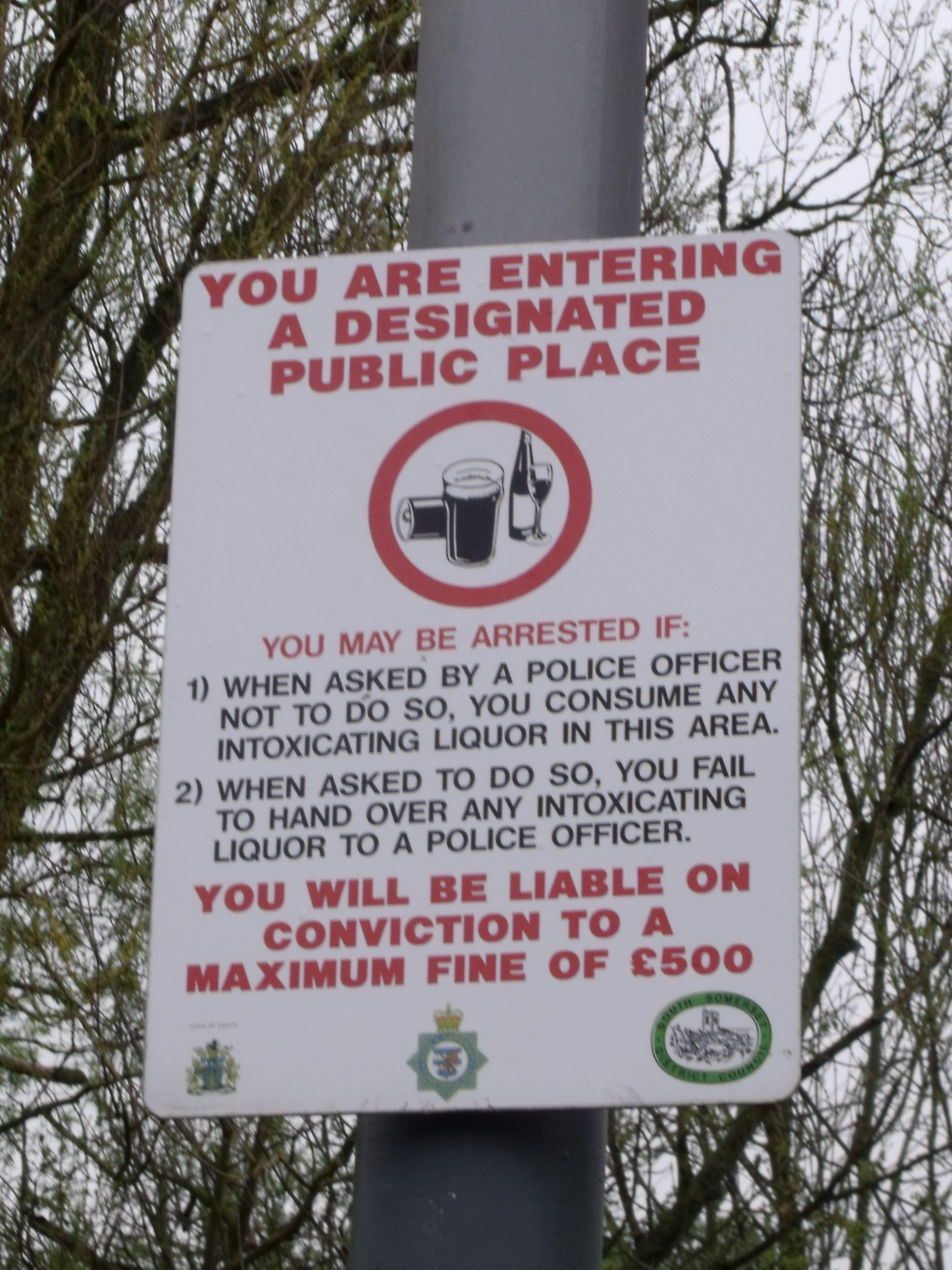
Designated Public Place sign in Yeovil, England

Designated public place orders (DPPOs) give police officers discretionary powers to require a person to stop drinking and confiscate alcohol or containers of alcohol from people they believe are consuming or about to consume alcohol in public places where the order is in effect. In the London Borough of Southwark, DPPOs are also called alcohol control areas (ACAs), while in the London borough of Hammersmith and Fulham, they are called controlled drinking areas (CDAs) or controlled drinking zones (CDZs). Failure to comply with alcohol restrictions in DPPOs can result in arrest and/or a fine of up to £500. DPPOs are implemented by local councils in order to address alcohol-related crime and disorder in public places. As of June 2009 712 DPPOs have implemented by local authorities since Section 12 of the Police and Criminal Justice Act 2001 gave councils the power to do so where they were satisfied that areas were suffering from alcohol-related crime and disorder. A common impact of enforcement of DPPO powers is displacement of street drinking to nearby areas.

A number of local authorities have used DPPOs to successfully reduce alcohol-related anti-social behaviour (ASB), but have stressed that DPPOs are not the solution to these problems but a useful tool to help address them. Some criticism has been levelled at the discriminatory element of the legislation (for instance should picnickers be allowed to drink openly in a park where street drinkers are?) but generally an officers' discretion is considered sufficient to take appropriate action or not. Some reports from police have also indicated the powers can be useful for addressing ASB related to the Night Time Economy and problems from licensed premises.

Section 26 of the Violent Crime Reduction Act 2006 makes some amendments to the law surrounding the designation of public places during public events.
