= Assault =

Physical or verbal attack of another person

In the terminology of law, an assault is the act of causing physical harm or unwanted physical contact to another person, or, in some legal definitions, the threat or attempt to do so. It is both a crime and a tort and, therefore, may result in criminal prosecution, civil liability, or both. Additionally, assault is a criminal act in which a person intentionally causes fear of physical harm or offensive contact to another person. Assault can be committed with or without a weapon and can range from physical violence to threats of violence. Assault is frequently referred to as an attempt to commit battery, which is the deliberate use of physical force against another person. The deliberate inflicting of fear, apprehension, or terror is another definition of assault that can be found in several legal systems. Depending on the severity of the offense, assault may result in a fine, imprisonment, or even death.

Generally, the common law definition is the same in criminal and tort law.

Traditionally, common law legal systems have separate definitions for assault and battery. When this distinction is observed, battery refers to the actual bodily contact, whereas assault refers to a credible threat or attempt to cause battery. Some jurisdictions combined the two offenses into a single crime called "assault and battery", which then became widely referred to as just "assault". The result is that in many of these jurisdictions, assault has taken on a definition that is more in line with the traditional definition of battery. The legal systems of civil law and Scots law have never distinguished assault from battery.

Legal systems generally acknowledge that assaults can vary greatly in severity. In the United States, an assault can be charged as either a misdemeanor or a felony. In England and Wales and Australia, it can be charged as either common assault, assault occasioning actual bodily harm (ABH) or grievous bodily harm (GBH). Canada also has a three-tier system: assault, assault causing bodily harm and aggravated assault. Separate charges typically exist for sexual assaults, affray and assaulting a police officer. Assault may overlap with an attempted crime; for example, an assault may be charged as attempted murder if it was done with intent to kill.

== Related definitions ==
=== Battery ===
Battery is a criminal offense that involves the use of physical force against another person without their consent. It is a type of assault and is considered a serious crime. Battery can include a wide range of actions, from slapping someone to causing serious harm or even death. Depending on the severity of the offense, it can carry a wide range of punishments, including jail time, fines, and probation.

In jurisdictions that make a distinction between the two, assault usually accompanies battery if the assailant both threatens to make unwanted contact and then carries through with this threat. See common assault. The elements of battery are that it is a volitional act, done for the purpose of causing a harmful or offensive contact with another person or under circumstances that make such contact substantially certain to occur, and which causes such contact.

=== Aggravated assault ===
Aggravated assault is a violent crime that involves violence or the threat of violence. It is generally described as an intentional act that causes another person to fear imminent physical harm or injury. This can include the use of a weapon, or the threat of using a weapon. It is usually considered a felony offense and can carry severe penalties. Aggravated assault is often considered a very serious crime and can lead to long-term prison sentences.

Aggravated assault is, in some jurisdictions, a stronger form of assault, usually using a deadly weapon. A person has committed an aggravated assault when that person attempts to:

- cause serious bodily injury to another person with a deadly weapon
- have sexual relations with a person who is under the age of consent
- cause bodily harm by recklessly operating a motor vehicle during road rage; often referred to as either vehicular assault or aggravated assault with a motor vehicle.

Aggravated assault can also be charged in cases of attempted harm against police officers or other public servants.

== Defenses ==
Although the range and precise application of defenses varies between jurisdictions, the following represents a list of the defenses that may apply to all levels of assault:

=== Consent ===
Exceptions exist to cover unsolicited physical contact that amounts to normal social behavior known as de minimis harm. Assault can also be considered in cases involving the spitting on or unwanted exposure of bodily fluids to others.

Consent may be a complete or partial defense to assault. In some jurisdictions, most notably England, it is not a defense where the degree of injury is severe, as long as there is no legally recognized good reason for the assault. This can have important consequences when dealing with issues such as consensual sadomasochistic sexual activity, the most notable case being the Operation Spanner case. Legally recognized good reasons for consent include surgery, activities within the rules of a game (mixed martial arts, wrestling, boxing, or contact sports), bodily adornment (R v Wilson [1996] Crim LR 573), or horseplay (R v Jones [1987] Crim LR 123). However, any activity outside the rules of the game is not legally recognized as a defense of consent. In Scottish law, consent is not a defense for assault.

=== Arrest and other official acts ===
Police officers and court officials have a general power to use force for the purpose of performing an arrest or generally carrying out their official duties. Thus, a court officer taking possession of goods under a court order may use force if reasonably necessary.

=== Punishment ===
In some jurisdictions such as Singapore, judicial corporal punishment is part of the legal system. The officers who administer the punishment have immunity from prosecution for assault.

In the United States, England, Northern Ireland, Australia and Canada, corporal punishment administered to children by their parent or legal guardian is not legally considered to be assault unless it is deemed to be excessive or unreasonable. What constitutes "reasonable" varies in both statutory law and case law. Unreasonable physical punishment may be charged as assault or under a separate statute for child abuse.

In English law, s. 58 Children Act 2004 limits the availability of the lawful correction defense to common assault. This defence was abolished in Wales in 2022.

Many countries, including some US states, also permit the use of controversial corporal punishment for children in school or home.

=== Prevention of crime ===
This may or may not involve self-defense in that, using a reasonable degree of force to prevent another from committing a crime could involve preventing an assault, but it could be preventing a crime not involving the use of personal violence.

=== Defense of property ===
Some jurisdictions allow force to be used in defense of property, to prevent damage either in its own right, or under one or both of the preceding classes of defense in that a threat or attempt to damage property might be considered a crime (in English law, under s5 Criminal Damage Act 1971 it may be argued that the defendant has a lawful excuse to damage property during the defense and a defense under s3 Criminal Law Act 1967) subject to the need to deter vigilantes and excessive self-help. Furthermore, some jurisdictions, such as Ohio, allow residents in their homes to use force when ejecting an intruder. The resident merely needs to assert to the court that they felt threatened by the intruder's presence.

== By country ==
=== Reported rate ===
The below table shows the rate of reported serious assaults for individual countries according to United Nations Office on Drugs and Crime for the last available year.

Country	Reported serious assaults per 100,000	Year
Albania	5.2	2023
Algeria	105.7	2023
Andorra	326.9	2019
Antigua and Barbuda	15.0	2023
Argentina	370.3	2023
Armenia	7.9	2023
Australia	309.8	2023
Austria	48.9	2023
Azerbaijan	3.2	2021
Bahamas	906.1	2022
Bahrain	326.0	2008
Bangladesh	0.4	2006
Barbados	392.8	2023
Belarus	7.6	2019
Belgium	567.9	2023
Belize	312.4	2022
Benin	44.3	2017
Bermuda	58.2	2017
Bhutan	107.5	2020
Bolivia	91.6	2023
Bosnia and Herzegovina	24.9	2023
Botswana	775.6	2014
Brazil	106.1	2023
Brunei Darussalam	123.7	2006
Bulgaria	56.7	2023
Burundi	5.1	2014
Cabo Verde	587.2	2018
Cameroon	25.4	2023
Canada	226.9	2023
Chile	88.5	2023
Colombia	223.9	2023
Costa Rica	142.1	2023
Croatia	23.6	2023
Cyprus	11.6	2023
Czech Republic	39.4	2023
Denmark	34.8	2023
Dominica	989.3	2023
Dominican Republic	26.2	2023
Ecuador	37.1	2023
Egypt	0.4	2011
El Salvador	77.4	2022
England and Wales	950.7	2022
Estonia	2.7	2023
Eswatini	347.9	2021
Finland	32.0	2023
France	628.3	2023
Georgia	5.1	2019
Germany	182.8	2023
Ghana	156.6	2021
Greece	12.8	2023
Grenada	1958.5	2023
Guatemala	112.6	2023
Guinea	3.0	2007
Guinea-Bissau	109.2	2016
Guyana	169.4	2023
Haiti	11.7	2018
Honduras	22.1	2023
Hong Kong	50.5	2023
Hungary	136.6	2014
Iceland	49.8	2023
India	25.8	2013
Indonesia	12.0	2022
Iraq (Central)	0.0	2020
Ireland	109.9	2023
Israel	80.7	2023
Italy	1.4	2023
Ivory Coast	47.1	2008
Jamaica	81.9	2023
Japan	17.8	2023
Jordan	6.7	2023
Kazakhstan	11.0	2017
Kenya	41.6	2022
Kosovo	18.1	2021
Kuwait	24.5	2009
Kyrgyzstan	0.5	2020
Latvia	28.6	2023
Lebanon	118.5	2016
Lesotho	370.1	2009
Liechtenstein	234.9	2023
Lithuania	4.8	2023
Luxembourg	102.7	2023
Macau	0.1	2022
Madagascar	8.6	2015
Malaysia	10.5	2023
Maldives	77.2	2017
Malta	41.1	2023
Mauritius	21.2	2021
Mexico	47.7	2023
Moldova	4.4	2023
Monaco	536.0	2015
Mongolia	0.3	2023
Montenegro	23.8	2023
Morocco	120.1	2023
Mozambique	2.3	2009
Myanmar	1.7	2023
Namibia	336.8	2021
Nepal	0.2	2016
Netherlands	25.3	2023
New Zealand	1068.8	2023
Nicaragua	15.1	2019
Nigeria	9.1	2013
North Macedonia	8.2	2023
Northern Ireland	47.2	2023
Norway	37.1	2023
Oman	0.8	2023
Pakistan	12.8	2023
Palestine	13.0	2023
Panama	103.3	2023
Paraguay	9.1	2023
Peru	9.2	2022
Philippines	0.7	2023
Poland	13.3	2023
Portugal	7.3	2023
Puerto Rico	109.1	2022
Qatar	0.4	2021
Romania	1.0	2023
Russia	13.0	2020
Rwanda	29.7	2013
Saint Kitts and Nevis	359.3	2023
Saint Lucia	919.8	2023
Saudi Arabia	62.0	2019
Scotland	58.3	2023
Senegal	2.4	2010
Serbia	80.1	2023
Sierra Leone	337.1	2008
Singapore	6.7	2023
Slovakia	23.1	2023
Slovenia	7.7	2023
Solomon Islands	215.6	2008
South Africa	290.4	2017
South Korea	44.3	2023
Spain	55.3	2023
Sri Lanka	12.3	2019
St. Vincent and Grenadines	1117.2	2023
Suriname	137.7	2023
Sweden	45.5	2023
Switzerland	9.9	2023
Syria	0.7	2018
São Tomé and Príncipe	2.2	2011
Tajikistan	47.7	2011
Tanzania	4.5	2015
Thailand	28.0	2023
Trinidad and Tobago	49.0	2018
Turkey	101.8	2014
Turkmenistan	1.6	2006
Uganda	14.3	2017
Ukraine	3.8	2020
United Arab Emirates	2.0	2022
United States of America	277.9	2022
Uruguay	15.7	2023
Uzbekistan	3.9	2021
Vatican City	0.0	2023
Venezuela	6.3	2018
Yemen	0.1	2009
Zimbabwe	395.5	2008

=== Estimates of prevalence ===
The percentage of population which was physically assaulted in the past 12 months according to statistical surveys is shown in the below table.

Country	Female	Male	Total	Year
Argentina	1.9	2.7	2.3	2016
Australia	1.7	1.8	1.7	2023
Bangladesh	2.9	-	-	2019
Belarus	0.5	1.0	-	2019
Benin	1.8	1.6	-	2021
Bolivia	-	-	0.5	2023
Cabo Verde	3.1	4.0	3.6	2016
Cameroon	-	-	36.8	2011
Canada	2.4	2.5	2.5	2019
Central African Republic	2.3	4.1	-	2018
Chad	2.2	1.3	-	2019
Chile	0.8	1.0	0.9	2023
Colombia	0.4	0.6	0.5	2022
Comoros	2.3	2.7	-	2022
Costa Rica	2.6	-	-	2018
Cuba	0.2	0.6	-	2019
Czech Republic	-	-	3.7	2013
DR Congo	2.2	5.7	-	2017
Dominican Republic	2.7	2.9	2.8	2022
Egypt	-	-	7.0	2007
El Salvador	8.7	10.1	9.4	2019
England and Wales	1.4	2.1	1.7	2018
Estonia	1.1	2.2	1.7	2023
Eswatini	1.1	1.4	-	2021
Fiji	3.2	3.2	-	2021
Finland	6.4	4.5	5.5	2022
France	1.0	1.4	1.2	2022
Georgia	0.4	0.4	-	2018
Germany	1.3	2.8	2.0	2020
Guyana	2.3	4.7	-	2019
Honduras	2.0	2.4	-	2019
Iceland	1.9	2.2	2.1	2023
Indonesia	0.0	0.0	0.0	2022
Iraq	0.9	-	-	2018
Ireland	1.0	2.0	2.0	2019
Israel	0.7	1.2	0.9	2024
Italy	1.0	1.4	1.2	2016
Jamaica	5.0	-	-	2022
Kiribati	3.4	3.5	-	2018
Kyrgyzstan	0.4	-	-	2018
Laos	6.0	-	-	2016
Lesotho	2.5	4.8	-	2018
Madagascar	2.7	6.0	-	2018
Malawi	2.7	7.6	-	2019
Mexico	1.2	1.3	1.2	2023
Mongolia	4.3	5.3	-	2018
Montenegro	0.7	3.2	-	2018
Myanmar	-	-	9.7	2019
New Zealand	-	-	5.5	2014
Nigeria	1.8	2.4	2.1	2023
Northern Ireland	-	-	1.4	2019
Oman	-	-	0.6	2020
Pakistan	0.4	2.1	-	2019
Palestine	-	-	0.6	2020
Panama	-	-	1.4	2016
Paraguay	2.6	2.6	2.6	2019
Peru	-	-	2.3	2023
Philippines	5.0	-	-	2017
Poland	-	-	2.0	2023
Portugal	1.6	1.4	1.5	2022
Saint Lucia	-	-	0.6	2018
Samoa	0.5	2.6	-	2019
Saudi Arabia	-	0.5	0.5	2019
Scotland	1.3	1.8	1.6	2021
Serbia	1.0	-	-	2019
Slovenia	1.1	0.5	0.8	2020
South Africa	0.3	0.8	0.6	2019
South Korea	-	-	0.3	2022
St. Vincent and Grenadines	45.0	29.0	-	2021
Suriname	1.5	1.6	-	2018
Sweden	2.2	3.2	2.7	2023
Switzerland	0.8	1.2	1.0	2021
Thailand	0.1	0.2	-	2022
Tonga	0.7	2.6	-	2019
Trinidad and Tobago	2.1	-	-	2022
Tunisia	0.6	1.0	-	2023
Turkmenistan	0.0	-	-	2019
Turks and Caicos Islands	1.6	1.5	-	2019
Tuvalu	4.8	2.9	-	2019
Uganda	-	-	5.4	2024
United States of America	-	-	1.2	2023
Uzbekistan	0.1	-	-	2021
Vietnam	0.9	0.7	-	2020
Zimbabwe	3.4	6.3	-	2019

=== Australia ===
The term 'assault', when used in legislation, commonly refers to both common assault and battery, even though the two offences remain distinct. Common assault involves intentionally or recklessly causing a person to apprehend the imminent infliction of unlawful force, whilst battery refers to the actual infliction of force.

Each state has legislation relating to the act of assault, and offences against the act that constitute assault are heard in the magistrates' court of that state or indictable offences are heard in a district or supreme court of that state. The legislation that defines assault of each state outline what the elements are that make up the assault, where the assault is sectioned in legislation or criminal codes, and the penalties that apply for the offence of assault.

In New South Wales, the Crimes Act 1900 defines a range of assault offences deemed more serious than common assault and which attract heavier penalties. These include:

==== Assault with further specific intent ====
- Acts done to the person with intent to murder
- Wounding or grievous bodily harm
- Use or possession of a weapon to resist arrest

==== Assault causing certain injuries ====
- Actual bodily harm – the term is not defined in the Crimes Act, but case law indicates actual bodily harm may include injuries such as bruises and scratches, as well as psychological injuries if the injury inflicted is more than merely transient (the injury does not necessarily need to be permanent)
- Wounding – where there is breaking of the skin;
- Grievous bodily harm – which includes the destruction of a fetus, permanent or serious disfiguring, and transmission of a grievous bodily disease

==== Assault causing death ====
- Death
- Death when intoxicated (in regards to the offender)

=== Canada ===
Assault is an offence under s. 265 of the Canadian Criminal Code. There is a wide range of the types of assault that can occur. Generally, an assault occurs when a person directly or indirectly applies force intentionally to another person without their consent. It can also occur when a person attempts to apply such force, or threatens to do so, without the consent of the other person. An injury need not occur for an assault to be committed, but the force used in the assault must be offensive in nature with an intention to apply force. It can be an assault to "tap", "pinch", "push", or direct another such minor action toward another, but an accidental application of force is not an assault.

The potential punishment for an assault in Canada varies depending on the manner in which the charge proceeds through the court system and the type of assault that is committed. The Criminal Code defines assault as a dual offence (indictable or summary offence). Police officers can arrest someone without a warrant for an assault if it is in the public's interest to do so notwithstanding S.495(2)(d) of the Code. This public interest is usually satisfied by preventing a continuation or repetition of the offence on the same victim.

Some variations on the ordinary crime of assault include:

- Assault: The offence is defined by section 265 of the Code.
- Assault with a weapon: Section 267(a) of the Code.
- Assault causing bodily harm: Section 267(b) of the Code.
- Aggravated assault: Section 268 of the Code.
- Assaulting a peace officer, etc.: Section 270 of the Code.
- Sexual assault: Section 271 of the Code.
- Sexual assault with a weapon or threats or causing bodily harm: Section 272 of the Code.
- Aggravated sexual assault: See aggravated sexual assault.

An individual cannot consent to an assault with a weapon, assault causing bodily harm, aggravated assault, or any sexual assault. Consent will also be vitiated if two people consent to fight but serious bodily harm is intended and caused (R v Paice; R v Jobidon). A person cannot consent to serious bodily harm.

=== Ancient Greece ===
Assault in Ancient Greece was normally termed hubris. Contrary to modern usage, the term did not have the extended connotation of overweening pride, self-confidence or arrogance, often resulting in fatal retribution. In Ancient Greece, "hubris" referred to actions which, intentionally or not, shamed and humiliated the victim, and frequently the perpetrator as well. It was most evident in the public and private actions of the powerful and rich.

Violations of the law against hubris included, what would today be termed, assault and battery; sexual crimes ranging from forcible rape of women or children to consensual but improper activities; or the theft of public or sacred property. Two well-known cases are found in the speeches of Demosthenes, a prominent statesman and orator in ancient Greece. These two examples occurred when first, in addition to other acts of violence, Meidias allegedly punched Demosthenes in the face in the theater (Against Meidias), and second (Against Konon), when the defendant allegedly severely beat him.

Hubris, though not specifically defined, was a legal term and was considered a crime in classical Athens. It was also considered the greatest sin of the ancient Greek world. That was so because it not only was proof of excessive pride, but also resulted in violent acts by or to those involved. The category of acts constituting hubris for the ancient Greeks apparently broadened from the original specific reference to mutilation of a corpse, or a humiliation of a defeated foe, or irreverent, "outrageous treatment", in general.

The meaning was eventually further generalized in its modern English usage to apply to any outrageous act or exhibition of pride or disregard for basic moral laws. Such an act may be referred to as an "act of hubris", or the person committing the act may be said to be hubristic. Atë, Greek for 'ruin, folly, delusion', is the action performed by the hero, usually because of their hubris, or great pride, that leads to their death or downfall.

Crucial to this definition are the ancient Greek concepts of honor (timē) and shame. The concept of timē included not only the exaltation of the one receiving honor, but also the shaming of the one overcome by the act of hubris. This concept of honor is akin to a zero-sum game. Rush Rehm simplifies this definition to the contemporary concept of "insolence, contempt, and excessive violence".

=== India ===
The Indian Penal Code covers the punishments and types of assault in Chapter 16, sections 351 through 358.

Whoever makes any gesture, or any preparation intending or knowing it to be likely that such gesture or preparation will cause any person present to apprehend that he who makes that gesture or preparation is about to use criminal force to that person, is said to commit an assault.

— §351 of the Indian Penal Code

The Code further explains that "mere words do not amount to an assault. But the words which a person uses may give to their gestures or preparation such a meaning as may make those gestures or preparations amount to an assault". Assault is in Indian criminal law an attempt to use criminal force (with criminal force being described in s.350). The attempt itself has been made an offence in India, as in other states.

=== Nigeria ===
The Criminal Code Act (chapter 29 of Part V; sections 351 to 365) creates a number of offences of assault. Assault is defined by section 252 of that Act. Assault is a misdemeanor punishable by one year imprisonment; assault with "intent to have carnal knowledge of him or her" or who indecently assaults another, or who commits other more-serious variants of assault (as defined in the Act) are guilty of a felony, and longer prison terms are provided for.

=== Pacific Islands ===
Marshall Islands

The offence of assault is created by section 113 of the Criminal Code. A person is guilty of this offence if they unlawfully offer or attempt, with force or violence, to strike, beat, wound, or do bodily harm to, another.

=== Republic of Ireland ===
Section 2 of the Non-Fatal Offences against the Person Act 1997 creates the offence of assault, and section 3 of that Act creates the offence of assault causing harm.

=== South Africa ===
South African law does not draw the distinction between assault and battery. Assault is a common law crime defined as "unlawfully and intentionally applying force to the person of another, or inspiring a belief in that other that force is immediately to be applied to him". The law also recognises the crime of assault with intent to cause grievous bodily harm, where grievous bodily harm is defined as "harm which in itself is such as seriously to interfere with health". The common law crime of indecent assault was repealed by the Criminal Law (Sexual Offences and Related Matters) Amendment Act, 2007, and replaced by a statutory crime of sexual assault.

=== Sweden ===
Swedish law does not distinguish between assault and battery in the same what as some common law systems. "Assault", as per chapter 3 article 5 of the Swedish criminal code, is defined as intentionally inflicting "bodily injury, illness or pain on another person or renders them helpless or in some other similar state." The punishment, depending of the degree, may be a fine or imprisonment up to 12 years, in the most severe cases. What may be called assault in other jurisdictions may either be attempted assault, making an unlawful threat (chapter 4 section 5) or molestation (chapter 4 section 7). There are four different degrees of assault; minor assault, assault, gross assault and exceptionally gross assault.

=== United Kingdom ===
Piracy with violence
Section 2 of the Piracy Act 1837 provides that it is an offence, amongst other things, for a person, with intent to commit or at the time of or immediately before or immediately after committing the crime of piracy in respect of any ship or vessel, to assault, with intent to murder, any person being on board of or belonging to such ship or vessel.
Assault on an officer of Revenue and Customs
This offence (relating to officers of HMRC) is created by section 32(1) of the Commissioners for Revenue and Customs Act 2005.
Assaulting an immigration officer
This offence is created by section 22(1) of the UK Borders Act 2007.
Assaulting an accredited financial investigator
This section is created by section 453A of the Proceeds of Crime Act 2002.
Assaulting a member of an international joint investigation team
This offence is created by section 57(2) of the Serious Organised Crime and Police Act 2005.
Attacks on internationally protected persons
Section 1(1)(a) of the Internationally Protected Persons Act 1978 (c.17) makes provision for assault occasioning actual bodily harm or causing injury on "protected persons" (including Heads of State).
Attacks on UN Staff workers
Section 1(2)(a) of the United Nations Personnel Act 1997 (c.13) makes provision for assault causing injury, and section 1(2)(b) makes provision for assault occasioning actual bodily harm, on UN staff.
Assault by person committing an offence under the Night Poaching Act 1828
This offence is created by section 2 of the Night Poaching Act 1828.

Abolished offences:

Assault on customs and excise officers, etc.
Section 16(1)(a) of the Customs and Excise Management Act 1979 (c.2) provided that it was an offence to, amongst other things, assault any person duly engaged in the performance of any duty or the exercise of any power imposed or conferred on him by or under any enactment relating to an assigned matter, or any person acting in his aid. For the meaning of "assault" in this provision, see Logdon v. DPP [1976] Crim LR 121, DC. This offence was abolished and replaced by the Commissioners for Revenue and Customs Act 2005.
Assaulting a person designated under section 43 of the Serious Organised Crime and Police Act 2005
This offence was created by section 51(1) of the Serious Organised Crime and Police Act 2005. It related to officers of the Serious Organized Crime Agency and was repealed when that agency was abolished.

==== England and Wales ====
English law provides for two offences of assault: common assault and battery. Assault (or common assault) is committed if one intentionally or recklessly causes another person to apprehend immediate and unlawful personal violence. Violence in this context means any unlawful touching, though there is some debate over whether the touching must also be hostile. The terms "assault" and "common assault" often encompass the separate offence of battery, even in statutory settings such as section 40(3)(a) of the Criminal Justice Act 1988 (c. 33).

A common assault is an assault that lacks any of the aggravating features which Parliament has deemed serious enough to deserve a higher penalty. Section 39 of the Criminal Justice Act 1988 provides that common assault, like battery, is triable only in a magistrates' court in England and Wales (unless it is linked to a more serious offence, which is triable in the Crown Court). Additionally, if a defendant has been charged on an indictment with assault occasioning actual bodily harm (ABH), or racially/religiously aggravated assault, then a jury in the Crown Court may acquit the defendant of the more serious offence, but still convict of common assault if it finds common assault has been committed.

===== Aggravated assault =====
An assault which is aggravated by the scale of the injuries inflicted may be charged as offences causing "actual bodily harm" (ABH) or, in the severest cases, "grievous bodily harm" (GBH).

Assault occasioning actual bodily harm
This offence is created by section 47 of the Offences against the Person Act 1861 (24 & 25 Vict. c. 100).
Inflicting grievous bodily harm
Also referred to as "malicious wounding" or "unlawful wounding". This offence is created by section 20 of the Offences against the Person Act 1861 (24 & 25 Vict. c. 100).
Causing grievous bodily harm with intent
Also referred to as "wounding with intent". This offence is created by section 18 of the Offences against the Person Act 1861 (24 & 25 Vict. c. 100).

Other aggravated assault charges refer to assaults carried out against a specific target or with a specific intent:

Assault with intent to rob
The penalty for assault with intent to rob, a common law offence, is provided by section 8(2) of the Theft Act 1968.
Racially or religiously aggravated common assault
This offence is created by section 29(1)(c) of the Crime and Disorder Act 1998 (c. 37), defined in terms of the common law offence.
Racially or religiously aggravated assault occasioning actual bodily harm
This offence is created by section 29(1)(b) of the Crime and Disorder Act 1998 (c. 37), defined in terms of the common law offence.
Assault with intent to resist arrest
This offence is created by section 38 of the Offences against the Person Act 1861 (24 & 25 Vict. c. 100).
Assaulting a constable in the execution of his duty
Section 89(1) of the Police Act 1996 (c. 16) provides that it is an offence for a person to assault a constable acting in the execution of his duty or a person assisting a constable in the execution of his duty. It is a summary offence with the same maximum penalty as common assault.
Assaulting a traffic officer
This offence is created by section/10 section 10(1) of the Traffic Management Act 2004 (c. 18). This offence applies to Traffic Wardens, Civil Enforcement Officers and PCSOs if they have been conferred with road traffic powers by their force.
Assaulting a person designated or accredited under sections 38 or 39 or 41 or 41A of the Police Reform Act 2002
This offence is created by section/46 section 46(1) of the Police Reform Act 2002 (c. 30). Those sections relate respectively to persons given police powers by a chief police officer, such as PCSOs detention officers or contractors retained by police, accredited contractors under a community safety accreditation scheme, and weights and measures inspectors.
Assault on a prison custody officer
This offence is created by section 90(1) of the Criminal Justice Act 1991 (c. 53).
Assault on a secure training centre custody officer
This offence is created by section 13(1) of the Criminal Justice and Public Order Act 1994 (c. 33).
Assault on officer saving wreck
This offence is created by section 37 of the Offences against the Person Act 1861 (24 & 25 Vict. c. 100).
Assaulting an officer of the court
This offence is created by section 14(1)(b) of the County Courts Act 1984 (c. 28).
Cruelty to persons under sixteen
This offence is created by section 1(1) of the Children and Young Persons Act 1933 (23 & 24 Geo. 5. c. 12) and applies to a person who has responsibility for the child. In England (but not Wales since 2022), common law provides a defence of "reasonable punishment" to battery (i.e. assaults involving touching); the Children Act 2004 (c. 31) limits the defence to exclude, among other offences, cruelty under the 1933 act, but not battery, which implies that smacking is not always to be considered cruelty.
Sexual assault
The offence of sexual assault is created by section 3 of the Sexual Offences Act 2003 (c. 42). It is not defined in terms of the offences of common assault or battery. It instead requires intentional touching and the absence of a reasonable belief in consent.
Assault by penetration
This offence is defined by section 2 of the Sexual Offences Act 2003 (c. 42). Whereas rape consists only of penetration with the perpetrator's penis, assault by penetration can be committed with anything, though unlike rape it excludes penetration of the mouth. It carries the same maximum sentence of life imprisonment.
Assault on an emergency worker
The Assaults on Emergency Workers (Offences) Act 2018 (c. 23) makes common assault an either way offence (section 1) when committed against an emergency worker (defined in section 3), with a maximum sentence of two years' imprisonment if tried on indictment. The act did not repeal any enactments, so the existing offence of assault on a constable is still available, but that offence cannot be tried on indictment and is therefore limited to six months.

==== Scotland ====
In Scots law, assault is defined as an "attack upon the person of another". There is no distinction made in Scotland between assault and battery (which is not a term used in Scots law), although, as in England and Wales, assault can be occasioned without a physical attack on another's person, as demonstrated in Atkinson v. HM Advocate wherein the accused was found guilty of assaulting a shop assistant by simply jumping over a counter while wearing a ski mask. The court said:

[A]n assault may be constituted by threatening gestures sufficient to produce alarm

— Atkinson v. HM Advocate (1987)

Scots law also provides for a more serious charge of aggravated assault on the basis of such factors as severity of injury, the use of a weapon, or Hamesucken (to assault a person in their own home). The mens rea for assault is simply "evil intent", although this has been held to mean no more than that assault "cannot be committed accidentally or recklessly or negligently" as upheld in Lord Advocate's Reference No 2 of 1992 where it was found that a "hold-up" in a shop justified as a joke would still constitute an offence.

It is a separate offence to assault on a constable in the execution of their duty, under section 90 of the Police and Fire Reform (Scotland) Act 2012 (asp 8) (previously section 41 of the Police (Scotland) Act 1967 (c. 77)) which provides that it is an offence for a person to, amongst other things, assault a constable in the execution of their duty or a person assisting a constable in the execution of their duty.

==== Northern Ireland ====
Several offences of assault exist in Northern Ireland. The Offences against the Person Act 1861 (24 & 25 Vict. c. 100) creates the offences of:

- Common assault and battery: a summary offence, under section 42;
- Aggravated assault and battery: a summary offence, under section 43
- Common assault: under section 47
- Assault occasioning actual bodily harm: under section 47

The Criminal Justice (Miscellaneous Provisions) Act (Northern Ireland) 1968 (c. 28 (N.I.)) creates the offences of:

- Assault with intent to resist arrest: under section 7(1)(b); this offence was formerly created by section 38 of the Offences against the Person Act 1861 (24 & 25 Vict. c. 100).

That act formerly created the offence of 'Assault on a constable in the execution of his duty'. under section 7(1)(a), but that section has been superseded by section 66(1) of the Police (Northern Ireland) Act 1998 (c. 32) which now provides that it is an offence for a person to, amongst other things, assault a constable in the execution of his duty, or a person assisting a constable in the execution of his duty.

=== United States ===
Felony Sentences in State Courts, study by the United States Department of Justice

In the United States, assault may be defined as an attempt to commit a battery. However, the crime of assault can encompass acts in which no battery is intended, but the defendant's act nonetheless creates reasonable fear in others that a battery will occur.

Four elements were required at common law:

- The apparent, present ability to carry out;
- An unlawful attempt;
- To commit a violent injury;
- Upon another.

As the criminal law evolved, element one was weakened in most jurisdictions so that a reasonable fear of bodily injury would suffice. These four elements were eventually codified in most states.

The crime of assault generally requires that both the perpetrator and the victim of an assault be a natural person. Thus, unless the attack is directed by a person, an animal attack does not constitute an assault. However, under limited circumstances the Unborn Victims of Violence Act of 2004 treats a fetus as a separate person for the purposes of assault and other violent crimes.

Possible examples of defenses, mitigating circumstances, or failures of proof that may be raised in response to an assault charge include:

- Lack of intent: A defendant could argue that since they were drunk, they could not form the specific intent to commit assault. This defense would most likely fail, however, since only involuntary intoxication is accepted as a defense in most American jurisdictions.
- Mutual consent: A defendant could also argue that they were engaged in mutually consensual behavior. For example, boxers who are fighting in an organized boxing match and do not significantly deviate from the rules of the sport cannot be charged with assault.

==== State laws ====
Laws on assault vary by state. Since each state has its own criminal laws, there is no universal assault law. Acts classified as assault in one state may be classified as battery, menacing, intimidation, reckless endangerment, etc. in another state. Assault is often subdivided into two categories, simple assault and aggravated assault.

- Simple assault involves an intentional act that causes another person to be in reasonable fear of an imminent battery. Simple assault may also involve an attempt to cause harm to another person, where that attempt does not succeed. Simple assault is typically classified as a misdemeanor offense, unless the victim is a member of a protected class, such as being a law enforcement officer. Even as a misdemeanor, an assault conviction may still result in incarceration and in a criminal record.
- Aggravated assault involves more serious actions, such as an assault that is committed with the intent to cause a serious bodily injury, or an assault that is committed with a deadly weapon such as a firearm. Aggravated assault is typically classified as a felony offense.

Modern American statutes may define assault as including:

- an attempt to cause or purposely, knowingly, or recklessly causing bodily injury to another
- negligently causing bodily injury to another with a dangerous weapon (assault with a deadly weapon).
- causing bodily harm by reckless operation of a motor vehicle (vehicular assault).
- threatening another in a menacing manner.
- knowingly causing physical contact with another person knowing the other person will regard the contact as offensive or provocative
- causing stupor, unconsciousness or physical injury by intentionally administering a drug or controlled substance without consent
- purposely or knowingly causing reasonable apprehension of bodily injury in another
- any act which is intended to place another in fear of immediate physical contact which will be painful, injurious, insulting, or offensive, coupled with the apparent ability to execute the act.

In some states, consent is a complete defense to assault. In other jurisdictions, mutual consent is an incomplete defense to an assault charge such that an assault charge is prosecuted as a less significant offense such as a petty misdemeanor.

States vary on whether it is possible to commit an "attempted assault" since it can be considered a double inchoate offense.

===== Kansas =====
In Kansas the law on assault states:

Assault is intentionally placing another person in reasonable apprehension of immediate bodily harm.

===== New York =====
In New York State, assault (as defined in the New York State Penal Code Article 120) requires an actual injury. Other states define this as battery; there is no crime of battery in New York. However, in New York if a person threatens another person with imminent injury without engaging in physical contact, that is called "menacing". A person who engages in that behavior is guilty of aggravated harassment in the second degree (a Class A misdemeanor; punishable with up to one year incarceration, probation for an extended time, and a permanent criminal record) when they threaten to cause physical harm to another person, and guilty of aggravated harassment in the first degree (a Class E felony) if they have a previous conviction for the same offense. New York also has specific laws against hazing, when such threats are made as requirement to join an organization.

===== North Dakota =====
North Dakota law states:

Simple assault.

1. A person is guilty of an offense if that person:
  1. Willfully causes bodily injury to another human being; or
  2. Negligently causes bodily injury to another human being by means of a firearm, destructive device, or other weapon, the use of which against a human being is likely to cause death or serious bodily injury.

===== Pennsylvania =====
In Pennsylvania, an offender can be charged with simple assault if they:

- injure someone else recklessly, knowingly, or purposefully
- accidentally injure someone with a firearm or weapon
- cause a needle-stick to an officer or correctional employee during a search or arrest
- threaten or intimidate someone causing fear of imminent serious bodily injury

A person convicted of simple assault can be ordered to up to two years in prison as a second-degree misdemeanor.

An offender can be charged with aggravated assault if the offender:

- demonstrates extreme indifference to the victim's life
- injures or threatens to injure a law enforcement officer, correctional officer, firefighter, police officer, or teacher on duty, or for incapacitating any of these individuals

A person convicted of aggravated assault can face up to 10 years in prison as a second-degree felony. However, if the crime is perpetrated against a firefighter or police officer, the offender may face first-degree felony charges carrying a penalty of up to 20 years in prison.

===== Tennessee =====
In Tennessee assault is defined as follows:

39-13-101. Assault.

- (a) A person commits assault who:
- (1) Intentionally, knowingly or recklessly causes bodily injury to another;
- (2) Intentionally or knowingly causes another to reasonably fear imminent bodily injury; or
- (3) Intentionally or knowingly causes physical contact with another and a reasonable person would regard the contact as extremely offensive or provocative.

== See also ==
- Crime statistics
- Domestic violence
- Gay bashing
- Hate crime
- Mayhem
- Offences Against the Person Act 1861

== General and cited references ==
- Baker, Dennis; William, Glanville. "Chapter 9". Textbook of Criminal Law. London, Sweet & Maxwell.
