= Decriminalised parking enforcement =

Civil enforcement of UK car parking regulations

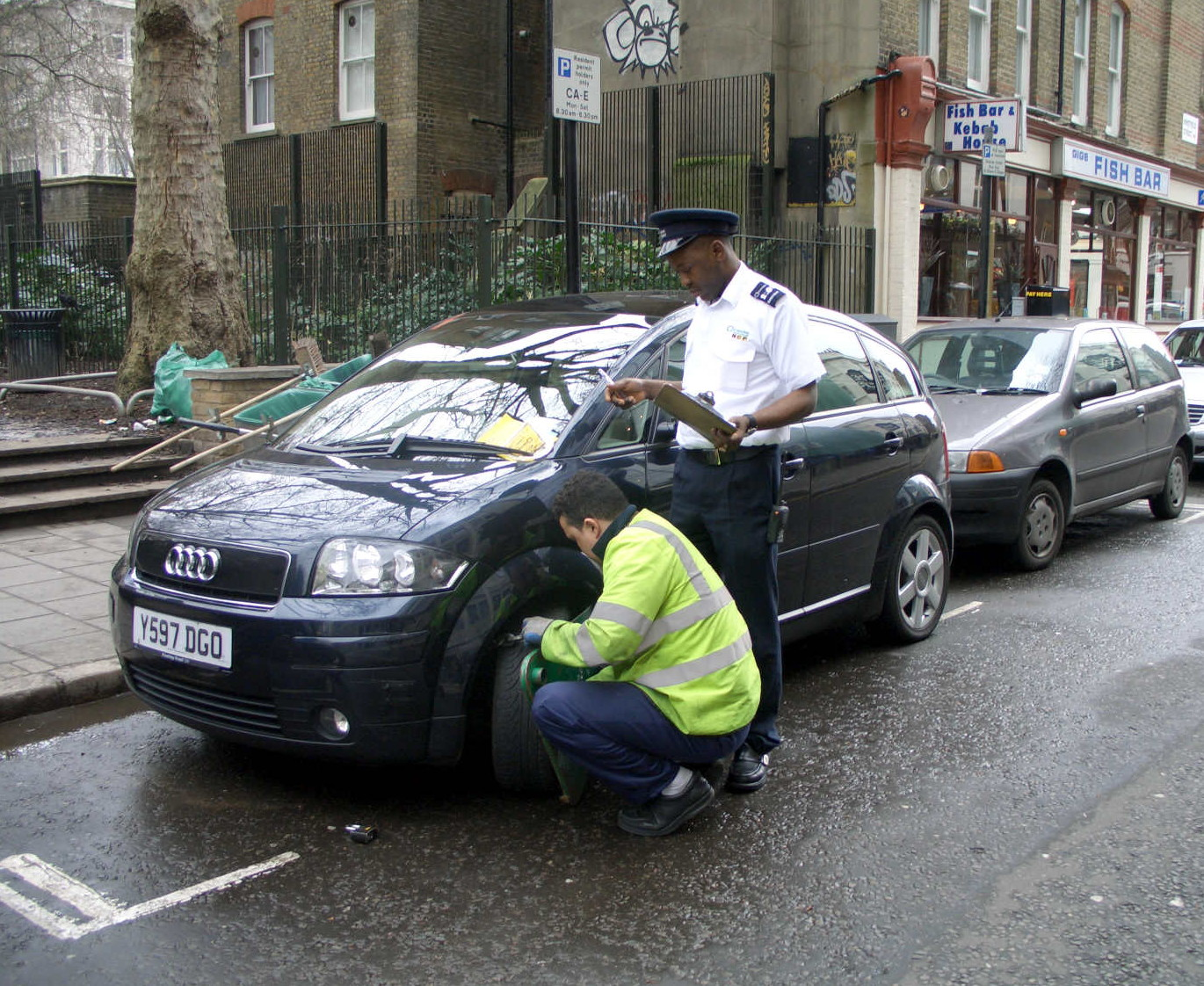
Vehicle clamping

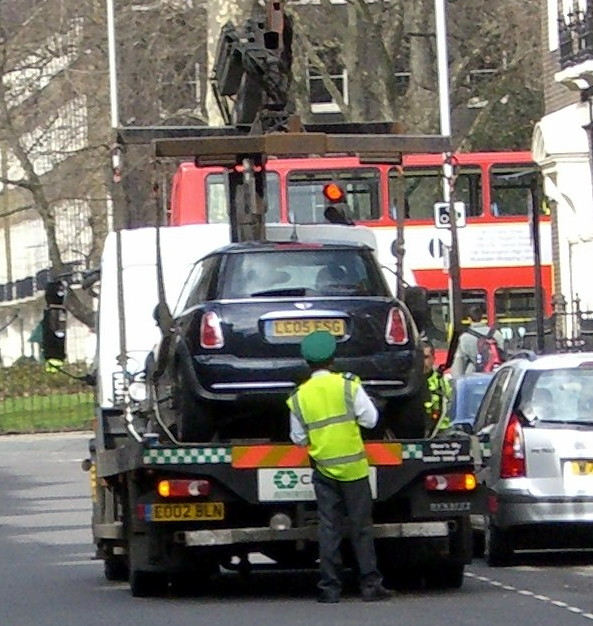
Vehicle removal

Decriminalised parking enforcement (DPE) is the name given in the United Kingdom to the civil enforcement of car parking regulations, carried out by civil enforcement officers, operating on behalf of a local authority. The Road Traffic Act 1991 (c. 40) provided for the decriminalisation of parking-related contraventions committed within controlled parking zones (CPZ) administered by local councils across the UK. The CPZs under the control of the local councils are also referred to as yellow routes and they can be easily identified with yellow lines marked on the roads with relevant time plates. Councils employ parking attendants to enforce their CPZs directly.

In England and Wales the statutory basis for civil parking enforcement is now Part 6 of the Traffic Management Act 2004, which replaced the corresponding provisions of the Road Traffic Act 1991; areas previously designated as special parking areas or permitted parking areas automatically became civil enforcement areas on 31 March 2008. The Department for Transport's statutory guidance uses the terminology of the 2004 Act and refers throughout to "civil parking enforcement" rather than decriminalised parking enforcement, and to civil enforcement officers rather than parking attendants. Scotland retains the earlier framework, decriminalised enforcement there continuing to operate under the Road Traffic Act 1991.

The chief rationale behind this provision within the Act was, amongst other reasons, to make sure people were not criminalised for car parking offences, like one may potentially become with some driving offences. However, some parking offences can still be enforced by the police with fines, failure to comply with which could lead to criminal proceedings and even the adding of points on the driving licence of the offender. Such parking offences enforced by police traffic wardens are parking contraventions committed in red routes (red routes are usually identified with red lines marked on the roads with the relevant time plates). Police traffic wardens can also enforce parked vehicles on pedestrian zig-zags/crossings, whether committed on red or yellow routes.

Most zigzags/crossings in London are no longer policed and responsibility for enforcement has been passed to local councils. So although it is still illegal there is no enforcement unless local councils take action during their parking control times, which are not 24-hour.

== Background ==
With increasing problems of town centre congestion and demand for on-street parking, coupled with the pressures on police resources, and the low priority given by some police forces to the enforcement of parking regulations, the Road Traffic Act 1991 permitted local authorities to apply for the legal powers to take over the enforcement of on-street, as well as off-street, car parking regulations from the police, in return they would be allowed to keep the proceeds. Thus in areas where DPE has been granted, parking offences cease to be criminal offences.

Without DPE, fixed penalties (not fines, because the recipient can exercise their right to a Court hearing instead) from the issue of parking tickets by the police is collected by Fixed Penalty Offices (each of which is part of a local Magistrates' Court in each county or metropolitan area) and passed directly to central government. With DPE in place, the local authority retains the income generated from parking penalties to finance parking enforcement and certain other activities such as local transport measures. Local authorities have been able to charge for on-street parking since 1958, but without the effective enforcement provided by DPE, such charging was of limited effect. Local authorities adopting DPE generally employ contractors to run their scheme.

The powers granted by DPE to deal with parking offences include:

- The issue of a Penalty Charge Notice (PCN) – a parking penalty which can be paid or contested by appeal (see below)
- The immobilisation of the vehicle – usually by clamping – until a release fee is paid
- The removal of the vehicle from the street

Appeals against council decisions on PCNs can be made to the London Tribunals (formerly the Parking and Traffic Appeals Service, PATAS) in London, the Traffic Penalty Tribunal (TPT) in England and Wales, the Scottish Parking Appeals Service in Scotland and the Northern Ireland Traffic Penalty Tribunal in Northern Ireland. These bodies are tribunals established under DPE; appeals against their decisions can generally be made only on points of law, through judicial review. They are independent of the councils, although funded by them in England and Wales through a fee of 60p per PCN issued. In Northern Ireland the Tribunal is operated by the Northern Ireland Court Service and all PCNs are issued by the Department for Regional Development as opposed to local councils.

== Challenging a penalty charge notice ==
In England, a motorist who receives a penalty charge notice may make an informal challenge to the issuing authority, usually within the 14-day period in which the penalty is payable at a 50% discount; the Secretary of State's statutory guidance recommends that an authority rejecting a challenge made in that window should consider re-offering the discount for a further 14 days. If the vehicle's registered keeper is subsequently served with a notice to owner, formal representations may be made on the statutory grounds set out in regulation 5(4) of the Civil Enforcement of Road Traffic Contraventions (Representations and Appeals) (England) Regulations 2022. The authority then has 56 days, beginning with the date it receives the representations, in which to serve a decision notice; if it fails to do so it is deemed to have accepted the representations and must cancel the notice and refund any payment. Rejected representations may be appealed to an adjudicator within 28 days. Because the proceedings are civil rather than criminal, it is for the authority to establish on the balance of probabilities that the contravention occurred, including that the signs, markings and underlying traffic order were valid for the exact place and time.

Where a penalty remains unpaid and no appeal is outstanding, the authority may serve a charge certificate increasing the penalty by 50%, and may then register the debt with the Traffic Enforcement Centre at the County Court Business Centre in Northampton, after which it is enforceable as though it were an order of the county court.

== Parking accounts and revenue ==
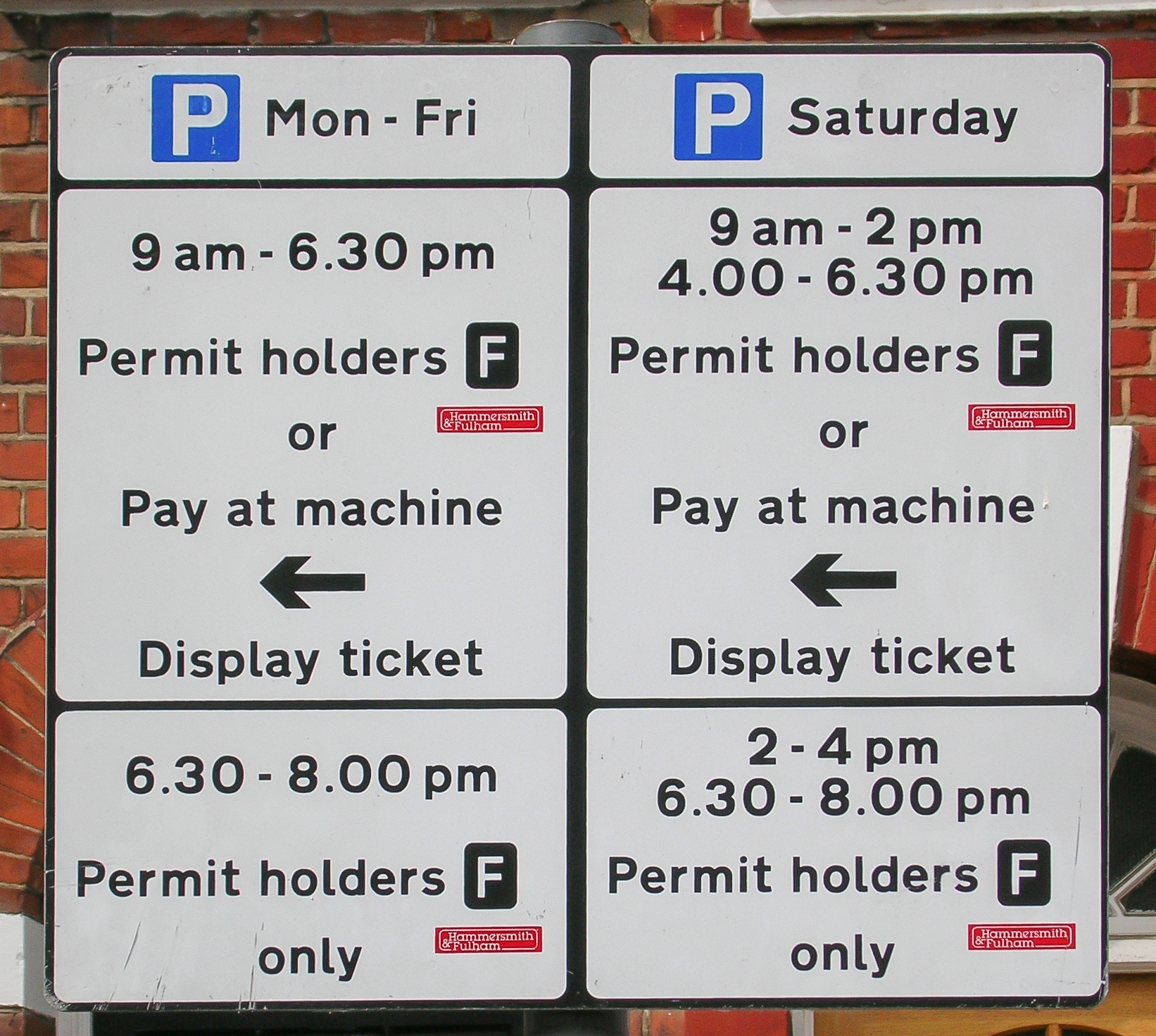
Roadside parking restriction sign

=== Statutory framework ===
A local authority in England and Wales must keep an account of its income and expenditure in respect of the parking places for which it is the local authority. Any deficit on that account at the end of a financial year must be made good out of the authority's general fund, or in Wales its council fund. Any surplus must be applied to the purposes specified in section 55(4) of the Road Traffic Regulation Act 1984 or, so far as it is not so applied, appropriated to a specific project falling within those purposes and carried forward until that project is carried out; alternatively the authority may determine to carry the amount forward in the account to the next financial year.

The specified purposes are making good amounts charged to the general or council fund in the four preceding financial years, and meeting or contributing to the cost of providing and maintaining off-street parking accommodation. Where it appears to the authority that the provision of further off-street parking in its area is unnecessary or undesirable, the surplus may instead be applied to the provision or operation of public passenger transport services, a highway or road improvement project in the authority's area, environmental improvement in that area, and – in the case of a London authority – the maintenance of roads maintained at public expense; prescribed authorities may apply it to any other purpose for which they may lawfully incur expenditure. That list of alternative purposes was substituted by section 95 of the Traffic Management Act 2004.

In London, Transport for London, the London borough councils and the Common Council of the City of London must report to the Mayor of London after each financial year on any action taken in respect of a deficit or surplus on the account.

=== Scale of income ===
Local authority parking income is reported to the Ministry of Housing, Communities and Local Government through the annual revenue outturn returns, and is analysed each year by the RAC Foundation. For 2024–25 the Foundation found that the 295 English authorities that had reported by the time of publication recorded £2.163 billion of income from on- and off-street parking against £1.070 billion of expenditure, a surplus of £1.094 billion. Westminster recorded the largest surplus of any authority at £90.6 million, up 19.3% on the previous year.

These figures cover parking operations as a whole and are dominated by parking charges rather than by penalty income; they are not the same measure as the statutory surplus on the section 55 account. Some councils have been accused of using parking enforcement as a source of revenue.

== Benefits ==
Proponents claim that DPE enables local authorities to better manage parking policies, reduce street congestion, and improve road safety by shifting parking contraventions from criminal to civil penalties. It is also argued that surplus income from DPE is legally ring-fenced for transport-related uses such as road improvements and public transport. Additionally, transparency is promoted through annual reporting of parking accounts to show how revenues and surpluses are spent. Some local government bodies assert that, over time, DPE increases compliance with parking restrictions and reduces the need for enforcement resources.

- Less congestion due to lack of obstruction
- Higher turnover of parking spaces – thus easier to park
- Reduced pollution and fuel use due to less circulating traffic and less congestion
- Safer streets due to less circulating traffic
- Improved emergency service access due to less obstructed streets
- Reduced demands on police resources

== Reform ==
The summary of an inquiry into parking policy and enforcement by the Transport Committee of the House of Commons states:

In addition to the main task of introducing a unified system of parking enforcement in Britain, we have found that the following action is required:

- Clear performance standards in applying parking restrictions must be established
- It must be made clearer to drivers what regulations are in force and how compliance is to be achieved
- Appropriate recruitment, remuneration and training is needed to ensure a professional parking service throughout the country
- The process for challenging penalty charge notices must be made much more transparent
- The impact of the parking adjudication service must be increased and its profile heightened
- Scrutiny of local authority parking departments is woefully inadequate and needs to be strengthened
- Local authorities must develop parking strategies which meet local objectives fully, focusing particularly on congestion, road safety and accessibility.

== See also ==
- Controlled parking zone
- Westminster motorcycle parking charge
