= Parking restrictions in the United Kingdom =

Laws around parking in the UK

The United Kingdom employs a number of measures to control parking on public highways. The main control is through signed bans on waiting or stopping such as clearways or yellow lines or through charging and time restriction schemes.

Parking management is dependent on correct signage and markings as controlled by the Traffic Signs Regulations and General Directions. All parking restrictions have to be supported by Traffic Regulation Orders and approved signs and lines.

== History ==
In 1947, George Musgrave entered a competition with the suggestion that yellow lines should be painted along the side of the road to indicate that parking is not permitted.

On 10 July 1958, the first parking meter in England was installed in London. The meter charged 6d for the first two hours, ten shillings for the next two hours and two pounds after that.

As of the Road Traffic Act 1991, parking offences have been decriminalised, and can be enforced by councils rather than the police, though parking pricing must be introduced as the parking enforcement must be self-financing.

== Pricing ==
Pricing is a system used to charge those parking in off-street and on-street spaces for their time parked. It can be used to discourage long-term and commuter parking in city centres and to generate revenue for local councils.

Remote payment or pay-by-phone parking allows parking to be paid for using a mobile phone, reducing the need for on-street infrastructure such as pay-and-display machines. The two major companies in the UK are RingGo and PayByPhone. Some local authorities, such as Westminster, have removed on-street cash machines altogether.

== Controlled Parking Zones ==
A Controlled Parking Zone or CPZ is a specific type of UK parking restriction that may be applied to a group of roads within the zone. The intended purpose of a CPZ is to reduce the clutter that can arise from erecting several signs that would otherwise convey the same information, such as a common time restriction sign adjacent to all the single yellow lines in the zone. The CPZ applies to all parking within the zone unless individual parking bays are signed with different restrictions.

== Yellow lines ==
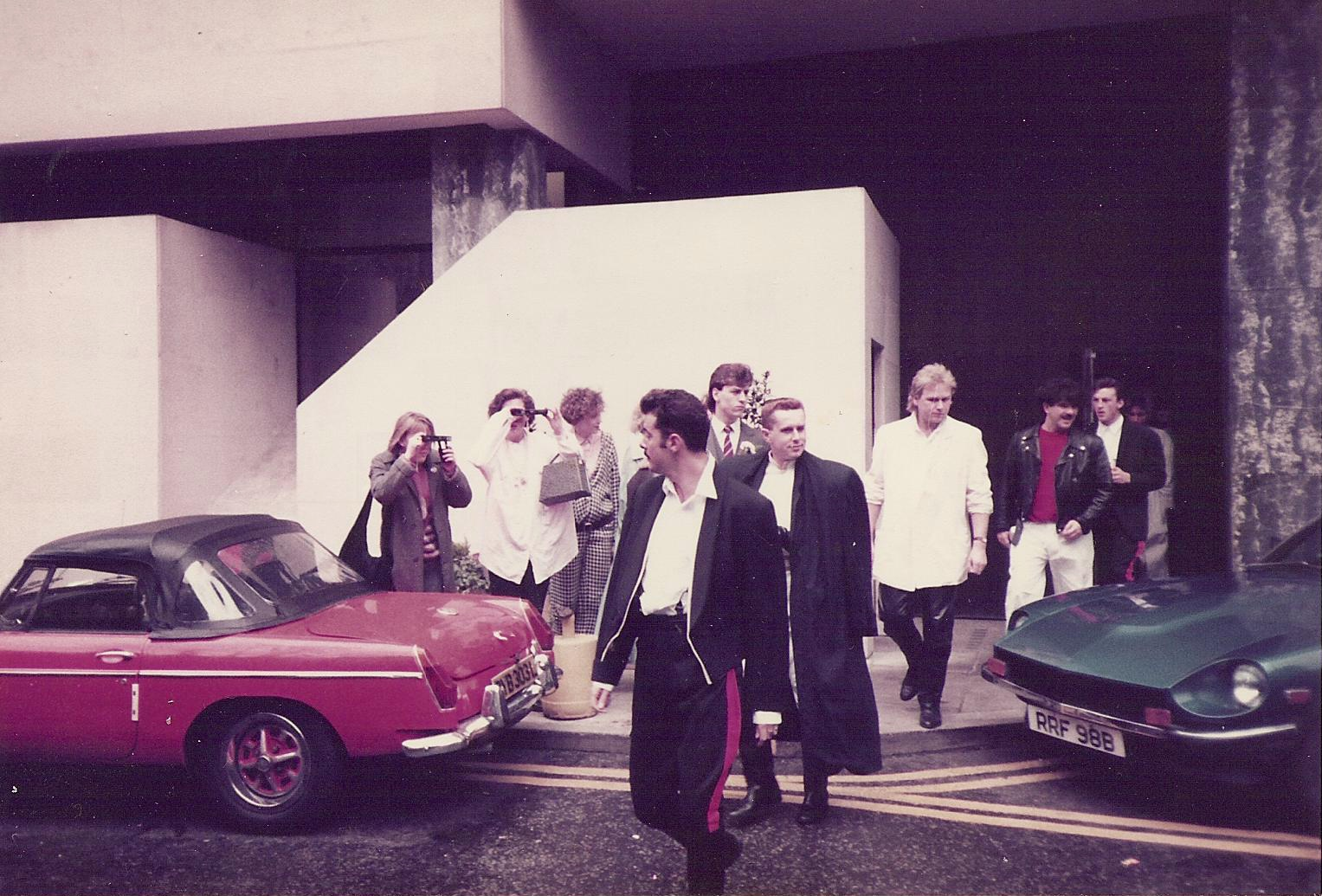
Cars illegally parked on double yellow lines

A single yellow line is a road marking that is present on the side of the carriageway in the United Kingdom. It indicates that parking or waiting at that roadside is prohibited at certain times of day. The exact times vary by area and are indicated by signs at the roadside, or by Controlled Parking Zone entry signs. Stopping to load and to pick up or set down passengers is generally allowed unless additional restrictions apply.

Double yellow lines along the edge of the carriageway indicate that waiting restrictions apply to the road (which includes the carriageway, footway and verge). A driver may stop for passengers to board or alight and to load or unload (unless there are also 'loading restrictions' - see below). The regulation applies to all vehicles. The restriction applies from the centre of the carriageway to the back of the footway.

Loading and unloading is allowed on double yellow lines at any time, unless there are additional markings indicating that there are 'loading restrictions'. A single short yellow stripe at regular intervals across the kerb or edge of the carriageway indicates that loading and unloading is not permitted at the times shown on accompanying black and white sign plates. Two short yellow stripes at regular intervals across the kerb or edge of the carriageway indicate that loading and unloading is not permitted at any time (and the sign plates may be omitted). Loading/unloading time may be restricted, depending upon the local authority making the restriction. One must not cause an obstruction to traffic or pedestrians.

== Stopping restrictions ==
In the United Kingdom, a clearway is a road or section of road on which it is illegal to stop on the main carriageway for any reason except in an emergency.

Certain sections of urban road may be designated Urban Clearway, which is a little-used designation, but one which prevents vehicles being stopped during the peak hours, typically 7am - 9:30 am and 3 pm - 6pm. Vehicles are permitted to stop only as long as necessary to pick up or set down passengers. This allows the commuter traffic to flow more freely, but still allows for overnight and daytime parking when the road is not so busy.

In London, Leeds and the county of West Midlands in the United Kingdom, red routes are major roads on which vehicles are not allowed to stop, first introduced in north and east London in 1991. The prohibition extends to stopping for loading or unloading, and to boarding or alighting from a vehicle (except for licensed taxis and the holders of blue badges). Red routes are mainly used on major bus and commuting routes.

Red routes are marked by red lines on the sides of the road. Double red lines mean that the rules and regulations apply at all times and on all days. Single red lines means that the prohibition applies during times displayed on nearby signs or at the entry to the zone. Red route clearways are signed but there are no lines on the road. Stopping is only permitted in lay-bys (red lines are only marked at junctions).
