= Parking enforcement officer =

Official who issues tickets for vehicle parking violations

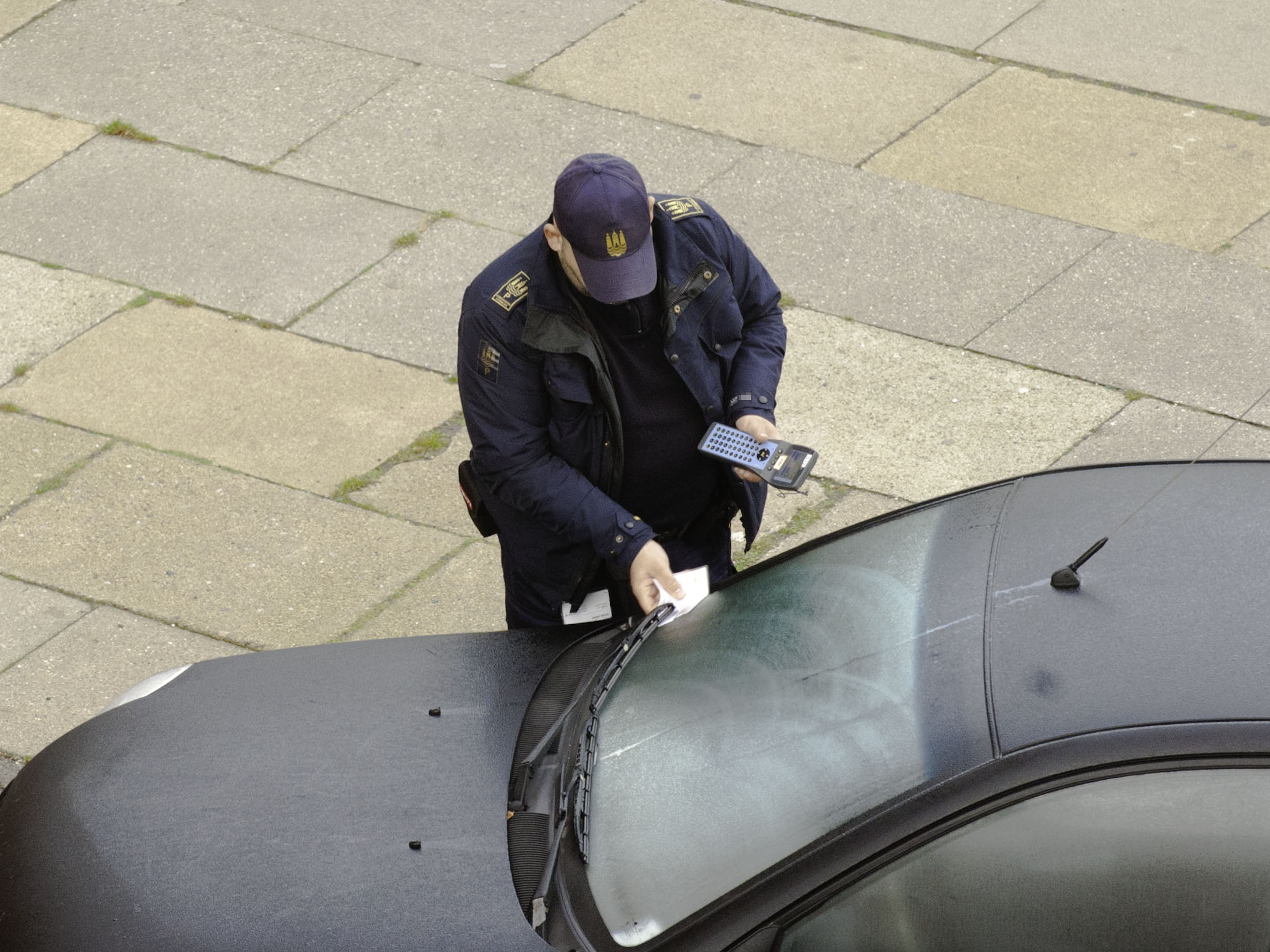
A parking enforcement officer issuing a ticket to a vehicle in Copenhagen, Denmark

A parking enforcement officer (PEO), traffic warden (British English), parking inspector/parking officer (Australia and New Zealand) is a member of a traffic control agency, local government, or police force who issues tickets for parking violations. The term parking attendant is sometimes considered a synonym but sometimes used to refer to the different profession of parking lot attendant.

In the United States, even where parking meters are no longer used, the term "meter maid," in use by 1957 and popularized by the Beatles song "Lovely Rita," is often still used to refer to female PEOs.

== Other duties ==
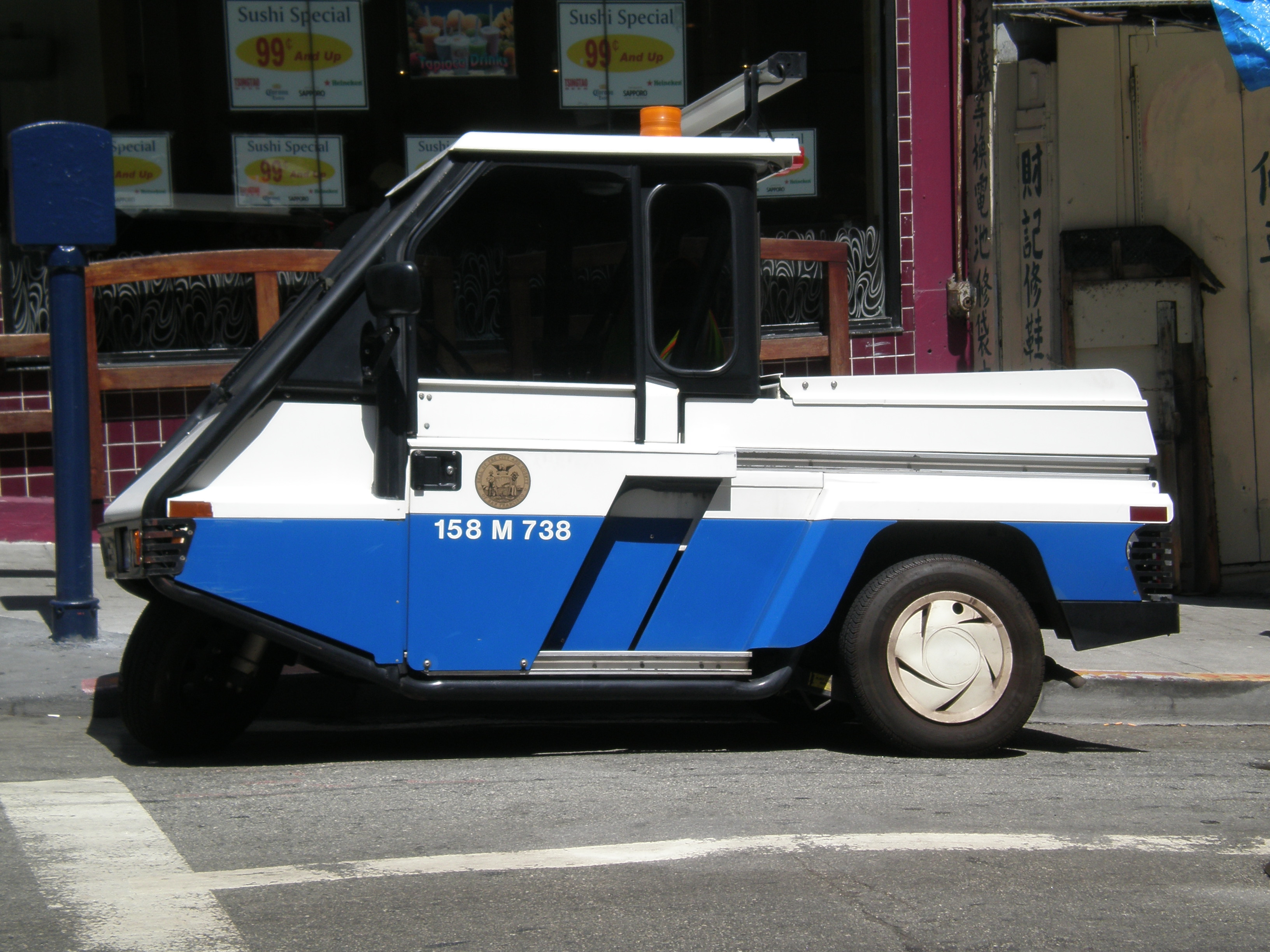
A San Francisco Police Department parking enforcement motorized tricycle

On 9 December 2007, the mayor of Stockholm, Mikael Söderlund, announced that the tasks of the parking enforcement officers will be broadened to include fining graffiti vandals and litterers. Trade union representatives say these officers are not prepared to take on new tasks, already stretched by metering vehicles, and that they fear the risk of violence. Those authorities in England that invested in vehicles with onboard computer and camera equipment have also begun policing bus lanes.

With the combination of the role of parking attendants in some areas of Great Britain into that of civil enforcement officers, many now routinely issue fixed penalties for such offences as littering, public drinking, anti-social behaviour and noise violations in addition to dealing with nuisance parking offences which previously escaped the attention of parking attendants as they contravened legislation other than the Road Traffic Act 1991. Nevertheless, the National Careers Service does not list any of these new tasks. Parking wardens in New Zealand are also empowered by law to enforce the use of special vehicle lanes, such as bus and transit lanes.

== By country ==
=== Canada ===
In Canada, parking enforcement duties are frequently handled under the umbrella of bylaw enforcement by bylaw enforcement officers. No jurisdictions remain where persons employed for the purpose of enforcing traffic bylaws are referred to as "meter maids" and increasingly fewer offices of "parking enforcement officer" exist. Most officials once employed as PEOs are now utilized to perform a variety of bylaw enforcement duties, often including animal control or the enforcement of other bylaws. The position is increasingly upgraded to that of the more professional position of bylaw enforcement officer. Common duties of bylaw enforcement officers include parking enforcement, property and zoning regulation, and regulation of general conduct of persons in public. Bylaw officers, however, only have the power to issue civil citations as such as penalties for most municipal bylaw violations.

The cities of Montreal, Toronto and Vancouver still employ officials with the title of parking enforcement officer. In the case of Montreal and Toronto, PEOs are a sub-division of their respective police force : the Montreal SPVM (where they are nicknamed "green onions" due to their formerly green uniforms) and the Toronto Police Service (where they have been nicknamed 'blue hornets' because of their blue uniform stripe, which is red on police officers' uniforms). In Vancouver's case, PEOs are employees of the municipal government, not affiliated with the Vancouver Police Department.

Canadian parking enforcement officers are de facto peace officers while in the performance of their duties and inasmuch as that designation is required for the performance of their duties, even if they are not sworn officers or constables. Case law has upheld this legal interpretation. See bylaw enforcement officer for case-law excerpts. This means that assault on a Canadian parking enforcement officer or bylaw officer conducting traffic bylaw enforcement is punishable under the Criminal Code of Canada as assault on a peace officer and carries higher penalties than standard assault.

In some areas in Canada, parking enforcement services are subcontracted to a private organization, such as the Canadian Corps of Commissionaires. However these facilities are usually privately owned parking lots and garage. Although some large municipalities have long standing agreements.

Toronto is deploying traffic wardens to help with congestion at major intersections in the city beginning in early 2018. Their focus is to expedite flow of cars and pedestrians at problem intersections, where they will replace use of Toronto police officers in the same role.

=== Indonesia ===
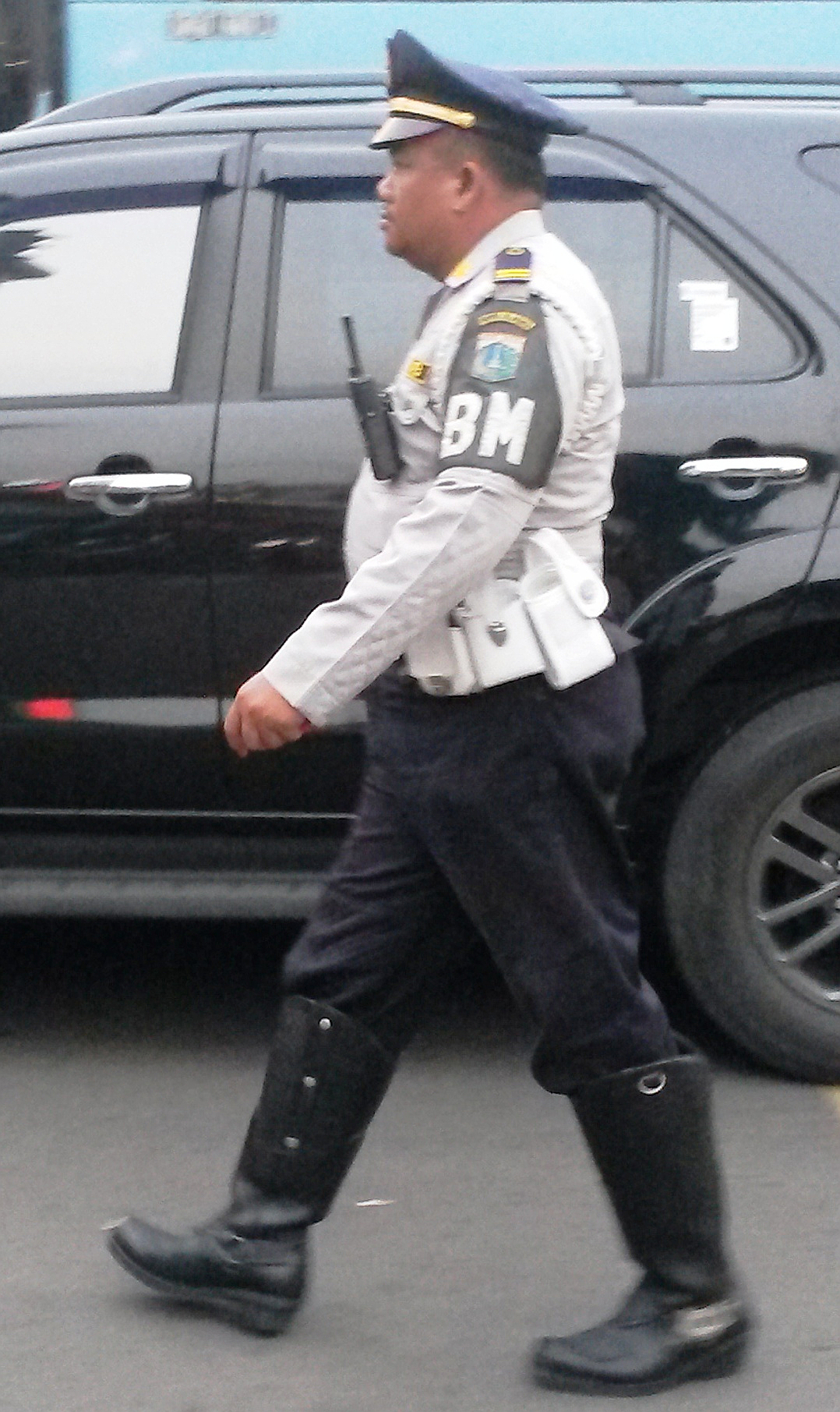
An Indonesian traffic warden (Dishub)

In Indonesia, traffic wardens, also known as parking enforcement officers, are under the Ministry of Transportation and are known as Dinas Perhubungan abbreviated "Dishub" or Dinas Lalu Lintas dan Angkutan Jalan Raya abbreviated "LLAJR" (Road Traffic and Transportation Agency). Besides enforcing parking regulations, they also assist the traffic police in directing traffic and enforce law and regulations towards public transportation vehicles such as public buses, taxis, trucks, etc. which use yellow license plates. They are usually stationed in public transportation terminals and posted at various roadways of the country and wear light blue as their uniform.

=== Ireland ===
In the Republic of Ireland, parking enforcement officers are employed by councils to enforce laws relating to the parking and stopping of motor vehicles. They were introduced by the Local Authorities (Traffic Wardens) Act 1975. Under the Road Traffic Acts, traffic wardens are empowered to issue on the spot parking tickets and fines for non-display of a tax disc. It is an offence to refuse to provide your name and address when demanded to do so by a traffic warden.

=== New Zealand ===
In New Zealand, a local authority may appoint a person to hold the office of parking warden. Parking wardens have jurisdiction on a public road within the local authority's region, and are warranted upon appointment to enforce parking offences and special vehicle lane offences. The fines for various parking offences are considerably lower than many other places around the world, with fines as low as $12 for minor offences. However, abuse and violence against officers is common, resulting in some councils adopting body worn cameras for them. Parking wardens may direct people to remove their vehicle off a public road if it causes an obstruction on the road or to any vehicle entrance, or if it is desirable in the interests of road safety or the interests of the Public. They can also (for the reasons just mentioned) authorize the towing of vehicles on a public road. Similar to Ireland, it is an offence in certain circumstances if the driver or person in charge of a vehicle refuses to provide their details when required to do so by a parking warden.

The term 'parking warden' is considered to be a misnomer, as they deal with matters more than just parking, especially as the law also empowers them to enforce certain moving violations, such as unauthorised use of a special vehicle lane.

=== United Kingdom ===
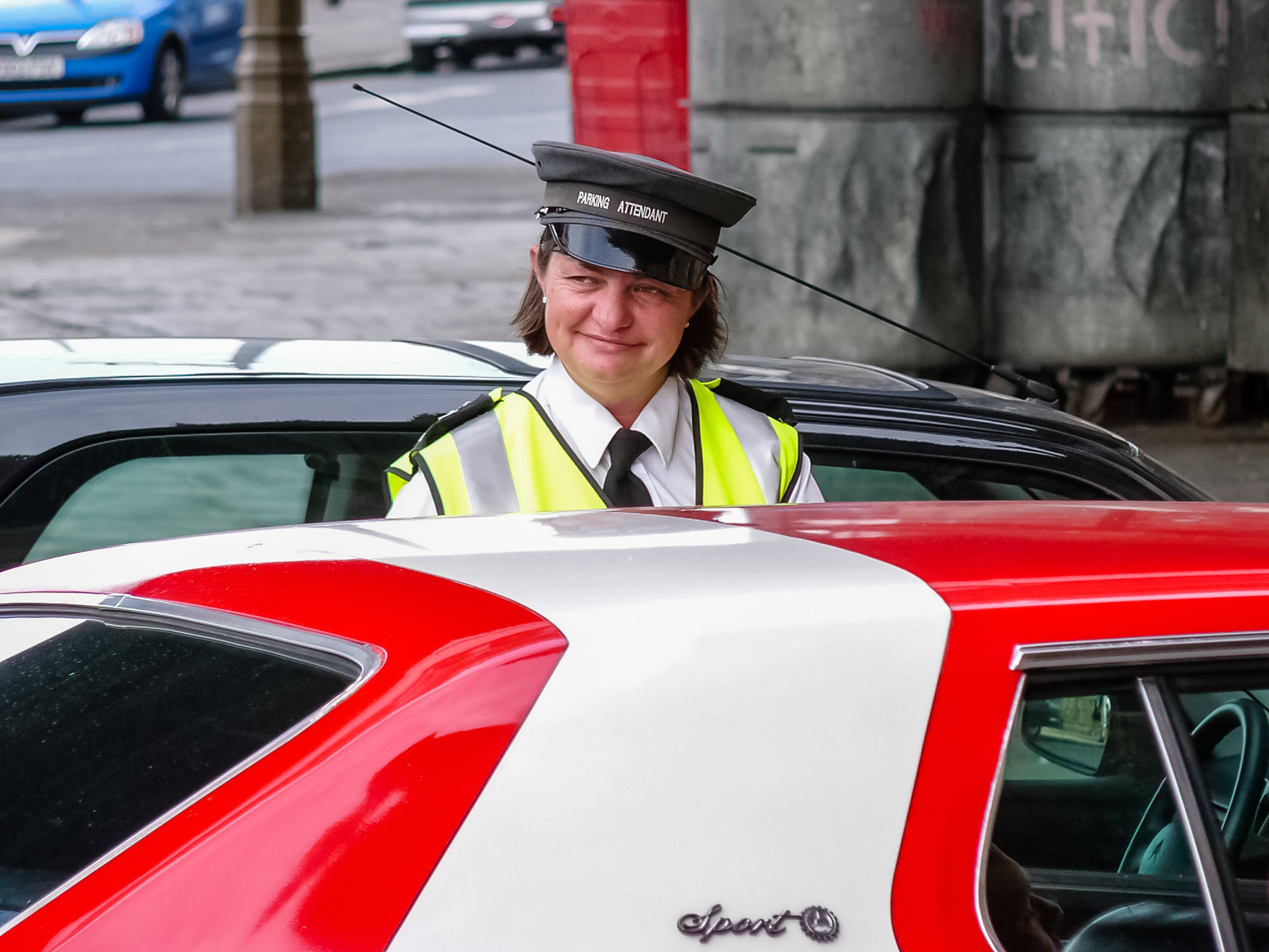
Traffic warden in Edinburgh, Scotland

In the United Kingdom (UK), traffic wardens have historically, since the 1960s, been employed by the territorial police force to help with traffic management and parking regulations. Their origins in the UK can be traced back to the work of Athelstan Popkess who in 1959 proposed the idea of "a body of men, eager for police work, but barred by height or age to deal with trifling motoring offences like illegal parking and obstruction" to the Home Secretary Ernest Marples and his professional colleagues. He took the idea from a scheme already in existence in South Africa.

Now 'Parking Attendants' and 'Civil Enforcement Officers' are used by local authorities to pursue decriminalised parking enforcement and thus almost everywhere replaced the "traffic warden", who was part of a police force.

==== Public perception ====
Accusations of overzealousness on the part of parking attendants is likely due to high pressure management focused around delivering a certain number of tickets per day, leading to allegations of corruption and illegality. This brings accusations that their real purpose is to raise revenue for the local authority rather than keep the traffic moving. Those who receive fines argue that the "punishment does not fit the crime," pointing to the size of fines levied for minor parking violations in comparison with fines generally issued for more serious motoring offences or other offences such as shoplifting. Public dislike of parking attendants in the UK is such that some parking attendants have been stabbed, received death threats, and been issued stab-proof vests and cotton swabs to take DNA samples when members of the public spit on them, for later prosecution.

Enforcement of laws dealing with the parking of motor vehicles in the UK can be the responsibility of one or more of the following persons:

==== Public ====
- Civil enforcement officers (England, Wales, Scotland), including those previously known as parking attendants (whose duties might still be limited to parking contraventions or might now be extended to other road traffic contraventions where a local authority has chosen to do so), are employed by local authorities or a contractor providing their services to a local authority. Since the advent of decriminalised parking enforcement, they have largely replaced [police] traffic wardens as the primary enforcers of parking regulations. They have the power to issue penalty charge notices (PCNs) for parking contraventions dealt with by ss.63-79 Road Traffic Act 1991; in areas where their duties have been extended beyond that of a parking attendant they can also issue PCNs for parking offences coming under other legislation such as e.g. parking a vehicle entirely on a footway or the parking of a detached vehicle trailer or skip.
- Traffic attendants (Northern Ireland) issue parking offence penalty charge notices (i.e. a civil penalty not a criminal penalty) for the Roads Service using powers under the Traffic Management (Northern Ireland) Order 2005.
- Traffic wardens are employees of police forces and are primarily responsible for controlling traffic in general using powers available to authorised persons defined in the Road Traffic Act 1988. Their usage for parking enforcement is far less common since the advent of decriminalised parking enforcement which in many areas transferred the enforcement of offences concerning simple parking in controlled areas to local authorities; other parking offences such as any involving penalty points and/or those not involving the 1991 Act (or equivalent in Northern Ireland) remain enforceable by traffic wardens. Traffic wardens in the Metropolitan Police could be promoted to traffic warden supervisor, traffic warden controller, senior traffic warden controller, and area traffic warden controller. Most "traffic wardens" are now non-existent and have, in almost all areas, been replaced by local authority civil enforcement officers/parking wardens/parking attendants etc.
- Traffic officers of National Highways (England) operate under the Traffic Management Act 2004 and have various powers to deal with vehicles on a "relevant road" (chiefly motorways and trunk roads) which on other roads would be dealt with as parking offences by police or local authorities; this includes the power to remove such vehicles.

The power to deal with a parking offence on a highway generally remains available to a police constable.

==== Private ====
- Private parking enforcement agents (England and Wales) - landowners and private car park owners within England are increasingly using private parking enforcement companies and individuals to impose 'Parking Charge Notices' (Often abbreviated to PCN although not to be confused with Penalty Charge Notices which are issued by Civil enforcement officers) for infringements such as parking outside marked bays or over staying limited duration.

The British Parking Association (BPA) act as the industry body for parking operators. Landowners and agents who pursue private parking charges through the courts do so on the basis of trespass the BPA issue guidance to facilitate this through the use of onsite signage. Digital permit systems and mobile license plate recognition (LPR) technology can be used to monitor parking spaces and record violations, providing a more systematic approach to private parking management.

The BPA's Approved Operator Scheme Code of Practice (a guide for its members who operate enforcement in private car parks), section 27.1, says that:

"A driver who uses your private car park with your permission does so under a licence or contract with you. If they park without your permission this will usually be an act of trespass. In all cases, the driver’s use of your land will be governed by your terms and conditions, which the driver should be made aware of from the start. You must use signs to make it easy for them to find out what your terms and conditions are."

== In popular culture ==
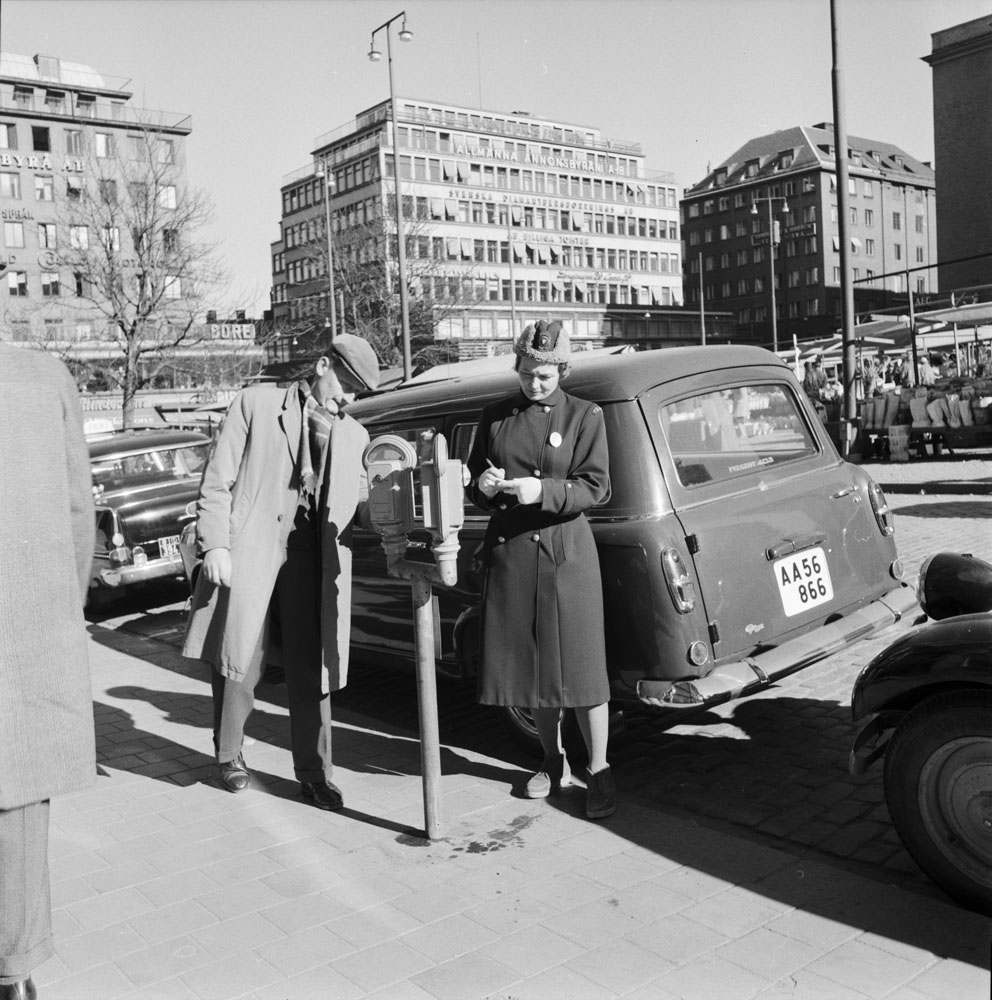
"Meter maid" in Stockholm, Sweden, 1961

The term "meter maid," in use by 1957, was popularised in The Beatles' song "Lovely Rita", in which the male singer, smitten with a female traffic warden, recalls:

Standing by a parking meter, when I caught a glimpse of Rita
Filling in a ticket in her little white book.
In a cap, she looked much older,
And the bag across her shoulder
Made her look a little like a military man.

Lovely Rita meter maid,
May I inquire discreetly,
When are you free to take some tea with me?

On the NBC television comedy series Rowan & Martin's Laugh-In, cast member Barbara Sharma was often featured as an overzealous meter maid (spelled Metre Made) who would ticket anything from baby carriages to trash cans.

The A&E reality television show Parking Wars focuses on parking enforcement.

In the 1984 BBC television drama Threads, a deputized traffic warden armed with a Self Loading Rifle is briefly shown keeping watch over an improvised internment camp for looters, following a nuclear strike on Sheffield. The warden's bandaged face was used in the promotional material for the film. Local traffic warden Michael Beecroft of the South Yorkshire Police was cast in the film as a traffic warden guarding an improvised detention camp.

In the 2016 Disney animated film Zootopia the main character, Judy Hopps, is disappointed to be assigned parking enforcement duties, but decides to excel at her task.

== See also ==
- Surfers Paradise Meter Maids – bikini-clad models who add coins to parking meters in Australia's Surfers Paradise
- Traffic police
- State police
- Traffic guard
- Highway patrol
- Traffic ticket
- Valet boy
- Car guard
