= Traffic Penalty Tribunal =

Tribunal in the United Kingdom which manages appeals against penalty charge notices

The Traffic Penalty Tribunal is a tribunal in the United Kingdom which manages appeals against penalty charge notices or PCNs, a form of civil penalty, for England outside Greater London and for Wales. It was created by statute to fulfil provisions of the Traffic Management Act 2004, it is partly responsible to the PATROL joint committee, a collection of local authorities responsible for enforcing PCNs who make use of the traffic penalty tribunals adjudication process.

Decisions of the Traffic Penalty Tribunal can be challenged by judicial review. The appeal process in England is governed by the Civil Enforcement of Road Traffic Contraventions (Representations and Appeals) (England) Regulations 2022, which revoked the 2007 Representations and Appeals Regulations previously in force, together with the Civil Enforcement of Road Traffic Contraventions (Approved Devices, Charging Guidelines and General Provisions) (England) Regulations 2022, which revoked the 2007 General Regulations. Those regulations extend to England and Wales but apply only in relation to England; appeals arising from Welsh authorities are governed instead by the Civil Enforcement of Parking Contraventions (Penalty Charge Notices, Enforcement and Adjudication) (Wales) Regulations 2008.

The tribunal handles roughly 25000 cases per year, the vast majority of appeals are handled virtually.

== Jurisdiction ==
The tribunal decides appeals against penalty charge notices issued by local authorities and charging authorities in England outside Greater London and in Wales; penalties issued within Greater London are heard instead by London Tribunals. Its jurisdiction covers parking contraventions and bus lane contraventions, and – since councils outside London began taking up the power in 2022 – moving traffic contraventions such as box junctions and banned turns, all of which are made subject to civil enforcement by Schedule 7 to the Traffic Management Act 2004. Adjudicators appointed to the tribunal separately hear appeals against penalty charges under road user charging schemes – including Clean Air Zones, the Dart Charge and the Mersey Gateway Bridge tolls – under regulation 11 of the Road User Charging Schemes (Penalty Charges, Adjudication and Enforcement) (England) Regulations 2013.

== Procedure ==
An appeal may be made only after formal representations have been made to the issuing authority and rejected, and must be lodged within 28 days of the notice of rejection. Appealing is free to the appellant, the tribunal being funded by the enforcement authorities rather than by fees. Adjudicators are appointed under section 81 of the Traffic Management Act 2004 and must be barristers or solicitors of at least five years' standing, appointed with the agreement of the Lord Chancellor. An appeal is normally determined without a hearing unless a party requests one, and may be disposed of on the papers once 28 days have elapsed from the acknowledgement of the appeal without either party requesting a hearing. An adjudicator must not normally make an order for costs, and may do so only where a party has acted frivolously or vexatiously, where its conduct in making, pursuing or resisting the appeal was wholly unreasonable, or where the enforcement authority's disputed decision was itself wholly unreasonable. An appeal is a rehearing rather than a review of the authority's decision: the adjudicator determines for themselves whether the contravention occurred and whether the statutory requirements were met, with the result that the authority's reasons for rejecting the earlier representations attract no deference and an appellant is not confined to the arguments raised at that stage.

== Decisions ==
An adjudicator may allow or dismiss an appeal, and must allow it where the enforcement authority consents to the appeal being allowed – an authority is not obliged to contest an appeal once lodged. A decision may be reviewed by an adjudicator on the application of a party, but only on limited grounds including administrative error, the wrongful rejection of a notice of appeal, and where the interests of justice require it. Beyond review, a decision can be challenged only by judicial review in the High Court. Mitigating circumstances are not among the statutory grounds on which representations or an appeal may succeed, and adjudicators have accordingly held that there is no de minimis principle in this area: a vehicle marginally in contravention is in contravention, and the smallness of the margin bears only on mitigation rather than on whether the contravention occurred.
