= Controlled Parking Zone =

Parking restriction used in the UK

A Controlled Parking Zone or CPZ is a specific type of parking restriction used in the United Kingdom that may be applied to a group of roads within the zone. The intended purpose of a CPZ is to reduce the clutter that can arise from erecting several signs that would otherwise convey the same information, such as a common time restriction sign adjacent to all the single yellow lines in the zone. A sign indicating the start of a CPZ typically states that there are parking, loading, weight or other restrictions between certain hours of operation.

The CPZ applies to all parking within the zone unless individual parking bays are signed with different restrictions.

The earliest reference to a 'Controlled Parking Zone' in the London Gazette is for Bristol City Council on 10 November 1959.

Start of controlled zone, with applicable times

End of controlled zone

== Uses ==
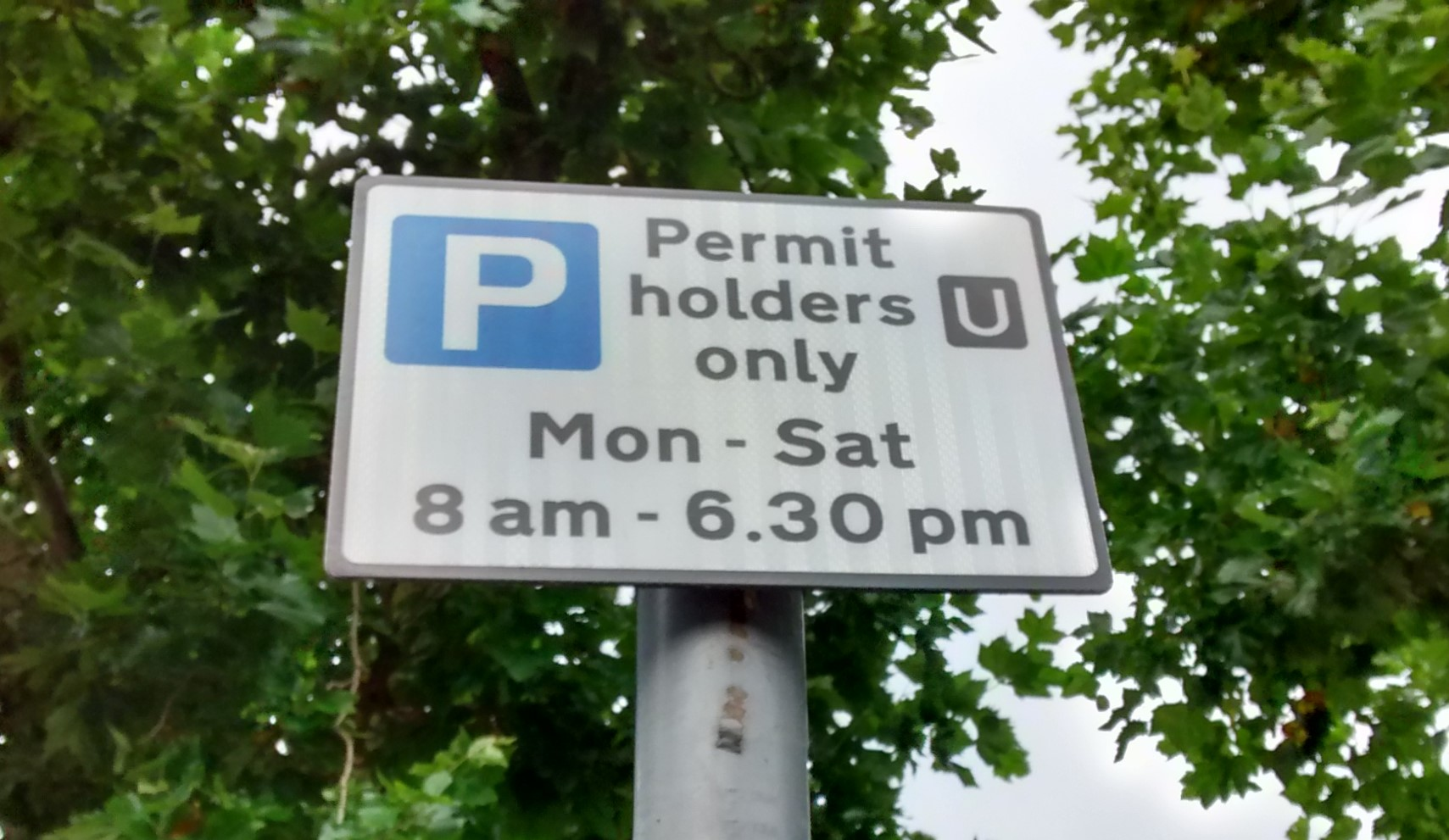
This sign indicates that only local residents can park here during the specified times.

A common use for a CPZ is to allow only residents, or other valid permit holders, of an area to park in on-street spaces at certain times of the day, which will be shown on street signs.

CPZ permits are not free, and local councils set the fees for permits. A permit does not guarantee a resident the right to park on a specific road or in a specific place, but allows that a permit holder may occupy any available space within the CPZ according to the terms of the permit.

== Legal status ==
Controlled Parking Zones are defined in statute by Schedule 4 of the Traffic Signs Regulations and General Directions 2016.

In 2010 Neil Herron lost a challenge to the legality of a CPZ operated by Sunderland City Council, having claimed that the presence of other road markings within the zone rendered it invalid. He was issued with 55 fixed penalty notices for parking offences in the zone and made representations to the parking adjudicator, claiming that the offences did not occur due as the CPZ was not valid.

The case was heard by the Court of Appeal in 2011 whereby the judge upheld the legality of the CPZ operated by Sunderland.

== See also ==
- Decriminalised parking enforcement
