= Civil enforcement officer =

Officer who enforces parking and traffic restrictions

Civil Enforcement Officer
Occupation
- Names: Civil Enforcement Officer (UK); Special Enforcement Officer / BOA (NL)
- Synonyms: Traffic Warden; Parking Enforcement Officer; Parking Attendant; Stadswachten (BE); Handhaving (NL)
- Occupation type: Public servant, municipal official
- Activity sectors: Law enforcement, traffic management, public safety

Description
- Competencies: Issuing Penalty Charge Notices (PCNs); vehicle immobilization; permit inspection, confiscation; Detention/Identity confirmation (Netherlands)
- Fields of employment: Local government, private enforcement contractors

A civil enforcement officer (CEO) is a person employed to enforce parking, traffic and other restrictions and laws. When restricted to parking, it is known as traffic warden (also parking enforcement officer or parking attendant).

== England & Wales ==
In England, they are employed by county councils, London borough councils, metropolitan district councils or Transport for London, and in Wales by county (borough) councils - or private companies contracted by any of the above. Until the passage of the Traffic Management Act 2004, on-street parking and traffic movement violations were enforced by non-warranted police traffic wardens employed by constabularies. Off-street parking violations were enforced by parking attendants employed by local authorities and private companies.

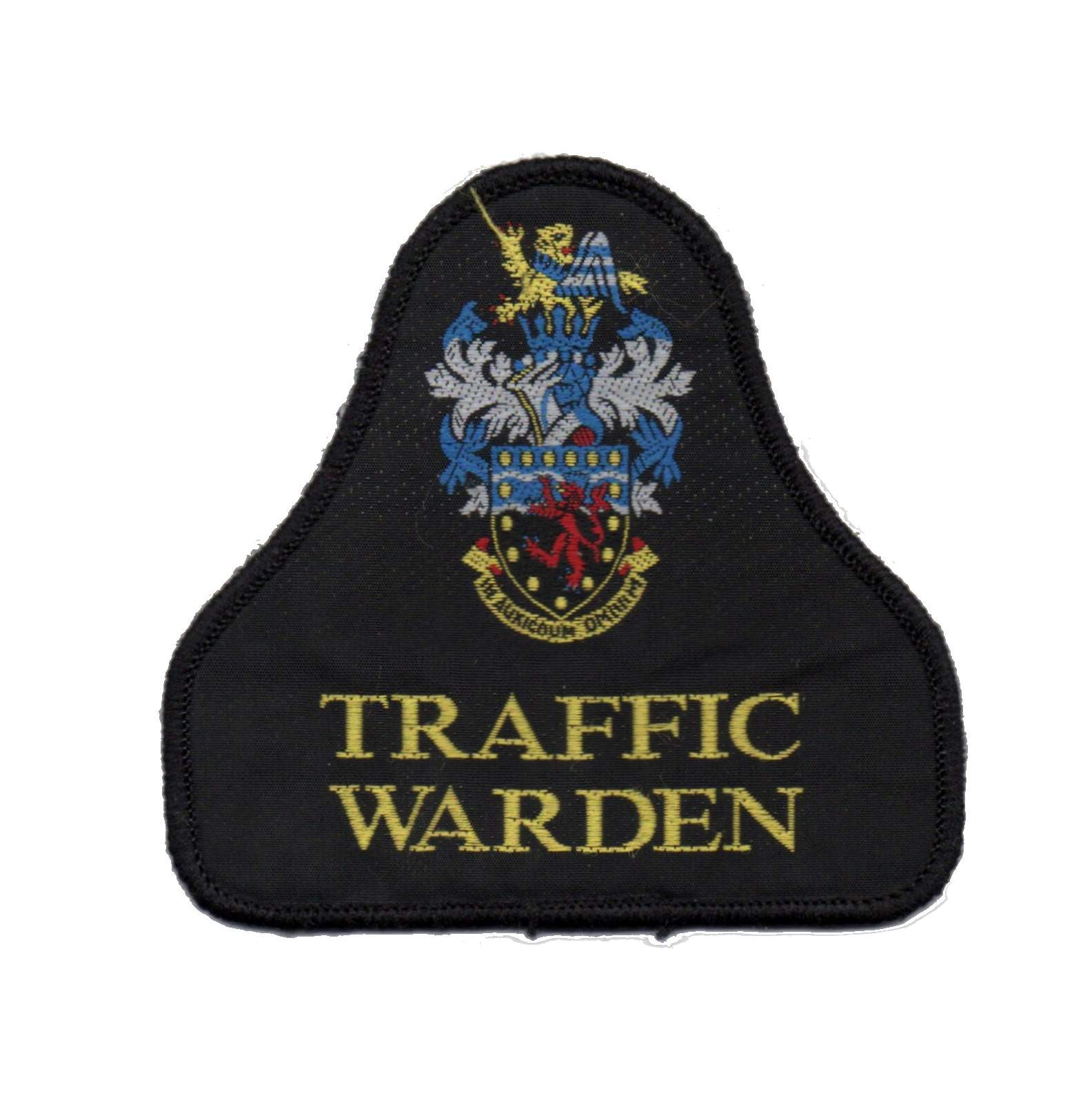
A former Devon and Cornwall Police traffic warden's uniform patch. This role is now defunct, with responsibility passing from police services to council services

=== Powers of a Civil Enforcement Officer ===
Civil enforcement officers may only exercise their functions when wearing a uniform authorised by the Home Secretary.

Their powers include:

- issue penalty charge notices for numerous offences (governed by civil law), either via a hand-held device or CCTV.
- inspect and confiscate disabled parking permits
- interview motorists suspected of disabled badge fraud under caution
- immobilise vehicles.

Penalty charges are civil debts rather than criminal penalties. An unpaid penalty charge may be made recoverable, if the county court so orders, as if it were payable under a county court order – a sum the Act calls a "traffic contravention debt". Recovery is then carried out by enforcement agents taking control of goods under Schedule 12 to the Tribunals, Courts and Enforcement Act 2007. The provision for certificated bailiffs formerly made by section 83 of the 2004 Act was repealed with effect from 6 April 2014.

A community safety accreditation scheme established under the Police Reform Act 2002 may grant an accredited person – who need not be a police employee – the power to issue fixed penalty notices for offences including littering, dog fouling, graffiti and fly-posting.

In Wales, the Vale of Glamorgan Council employs "dual role" uniformed enforcement officers that are authorised to enforce both civil parking legislation, and criminal legislation with regard to environmental crime, anti-social behaviour, bylaws and public spaces protection orders.

== Belgium ==
In Belgium, municipalities use Stadswachten (City Guards); these public but civil officials can be compared to civil enforcement officers and can only write reports that are sent to a magistrate who decides if, according to the findings of the guards report, a fine will be issued. In Belgium, Stadswachten can be recognized by the purple jackets they wear.

== The Netherlands ==
In the Netherlands municipalities used Stadswachten (City Guards) until 2004; these officers were public civil servants who patrolled the city but had no power to fine civilians. These days Stadswachten do not exist anymore, and the Guard departments were changed into Handhaving (Enforcement) units. Unlike the British City Wardens, Handhavers (Enforcers) do not have civil status but are fully public officials and have limited police powers. These officers are sworn BOA (Special Enforcement Officer) and have the powers to detain people to confirm their identity, search people for proof of identification or offensive or dangerous weapons (if arrested), investigate offences and certain crimes, issue fixed penalties, make warrantless arrests and use force with or without the use of weapons (baton, pepperspray). Most municipal enforcement officers (BOA) are equipped with handcuffs. Some cities also issue police batons to their officers. According to Dutch law, some BOA's can be equipped with pepperspray (cities of Utrecht and Amsterdam in 2016) and a handgun (cities of EDE and Enschede) if the necessity is proven by the city council and mayor. Also, BOA's working for the Dutch Correctional Services (Dienst Vervoer en Ondersteuning) who do transportation and guard duty for the Dutch Prisons are equipped with a baton, pepperspray and a handgun. They also support the Dutch police force whenever and where ever it is needed. Failure to comply with an order given by a BOA can result in arrest.

In 2014 the justice department ordered the creation of a national style uniform for BOAs employed by municipalities. Until that date, every city had its own uniform. The new uniform is based on the national police uniform but with a different color and unique element. The name used in this uniform is HANDHAVING and consist of a navy blue cargo pants, two colored polo shirts (navy and cobalt blue) with a checkered band across the chest. On the chest and on the back is the text "Handhaving" and on the sleeves are BOA patches which consist of a hand holding a scepter in front of a shield. Furthermore, officers wear Spanish-style police caps with a checker band and a metal BOA insignia on the front. Officers are allowed to wear high shoes with trouser legs twisted above them. Some cities issue officer anti stab vests in the same colors as the polo shirts, although a few cities use high-visibility yellow vests. A majority of large cities also use BOA bike patrol, motorcycle units (Amsterdam and Rotterdam), vehicle patrols in marked cars or plain clothes officers.
