= Yellow line (road marking) =

Type of road marking

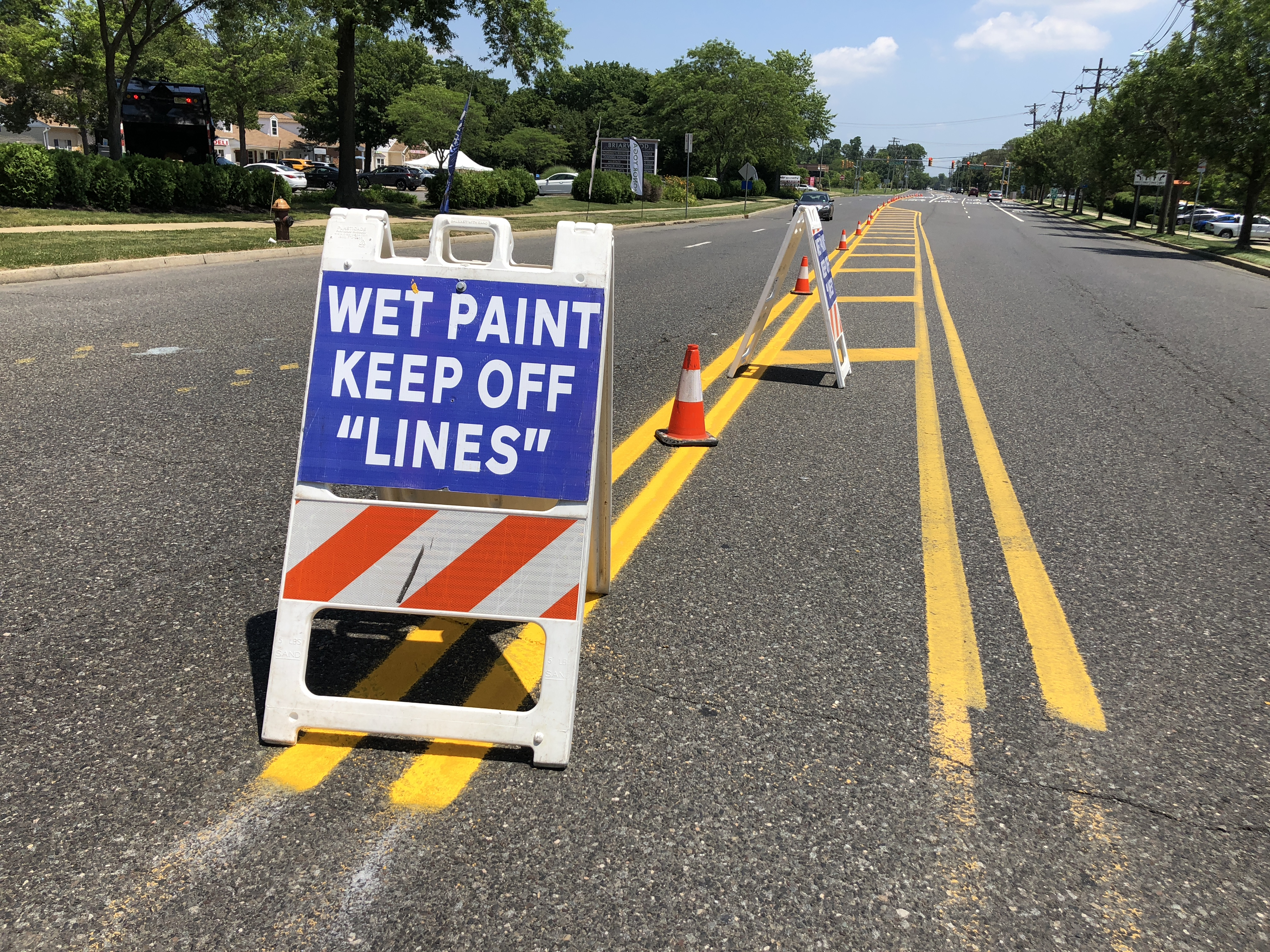
Yellow line median stripes being painted in New Jersey, United States

Yellow lines are road markings used in various territories.

== Single yellow lines ==
=== Parking restrictions ===
==== UK & Ireland ====
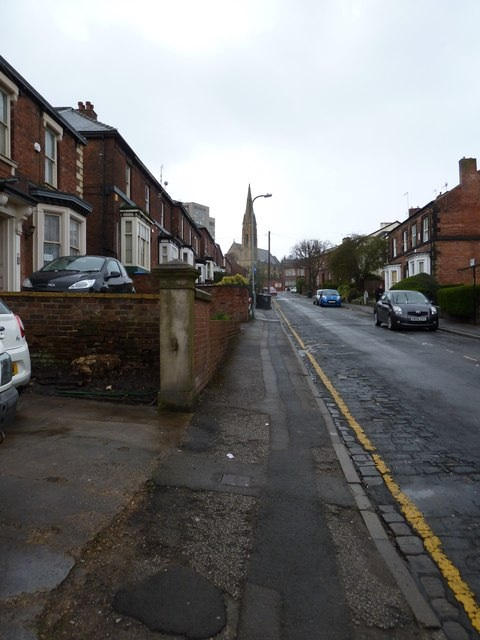
Single yellow lines are common along residential streets near to workplaces

A single yellow line is a road marking that is present on the side of the carriageway across the British Isles.

In the United Kingdom, the Isle of Man and Ireland, it indicates that parking or waiting at that roadside is prohibited at certain times of day. The exact times vary by area and are indicated by signs at the roadside, or by Controlled Parking Zone entry signs. Stopping to load and to pick up or set down passengers is generally allowed unless additional restrictions apply.

Double yellow lines along the edge of the carriageway indicate that waiting restrictions apply to the road (which includes the carriageway, footway and verge). A driver may stop for passengers to board or alight and to load or unload (unless there are also 'loading restrictions' – see below). The regulation applies to all vehicles. The restriction applies from the centre of the carriageway to the back of the footway.

In the Channel Islands, a yellow line parallel to the road indicates no waiting (in Jersey) or no stopping (in Guernsey) at any time of day.

==== Commonwealth ====
Countries formerly part of the British Empire are likely to retain a modified version of the British laws including the basic principles regarding road safety. In Malta for example, a single yellow line, means no waiting (i.e. no parking, but alighting of passengers is permitted). The sign is applicable all day.

==== Malaysia ====
In Malaysia, single yellow lines are used on most roads leading to cities or towns or busy areas to mark parking restriction for certain times.

=== Other uses ===
==== Channel Islands ====
In Jersey a yellow line perpendicular to the road indicates traffic should wait behind the line until the major road is clear (give way to other traffic) and is often accompanied with a Give way sign or a Yellow yield triangle painted on the road.

In Guernsey a yellow line perpendicular to the road means STOP and Give Way to traffic on the major road. Sometimes a yellow arrow is painted on the road to warn users of a yellow line ahead.

The yellow line for stopping is not used in Alderney or Sark.

==== Australia ====
In New South Wales, Australia, a broken single yellow line next to the kerb indicates a clear way, where parking is strictly prohibited during certain times of the day and/or special events. In the rest of Australia, an unbroken yellow kerb line is a no-stopping line; a driver must not stop except in an emergency. Single yellow lines are also used in areas with high snow fall to mark the far left side of the road.

==== Continental Europe ====
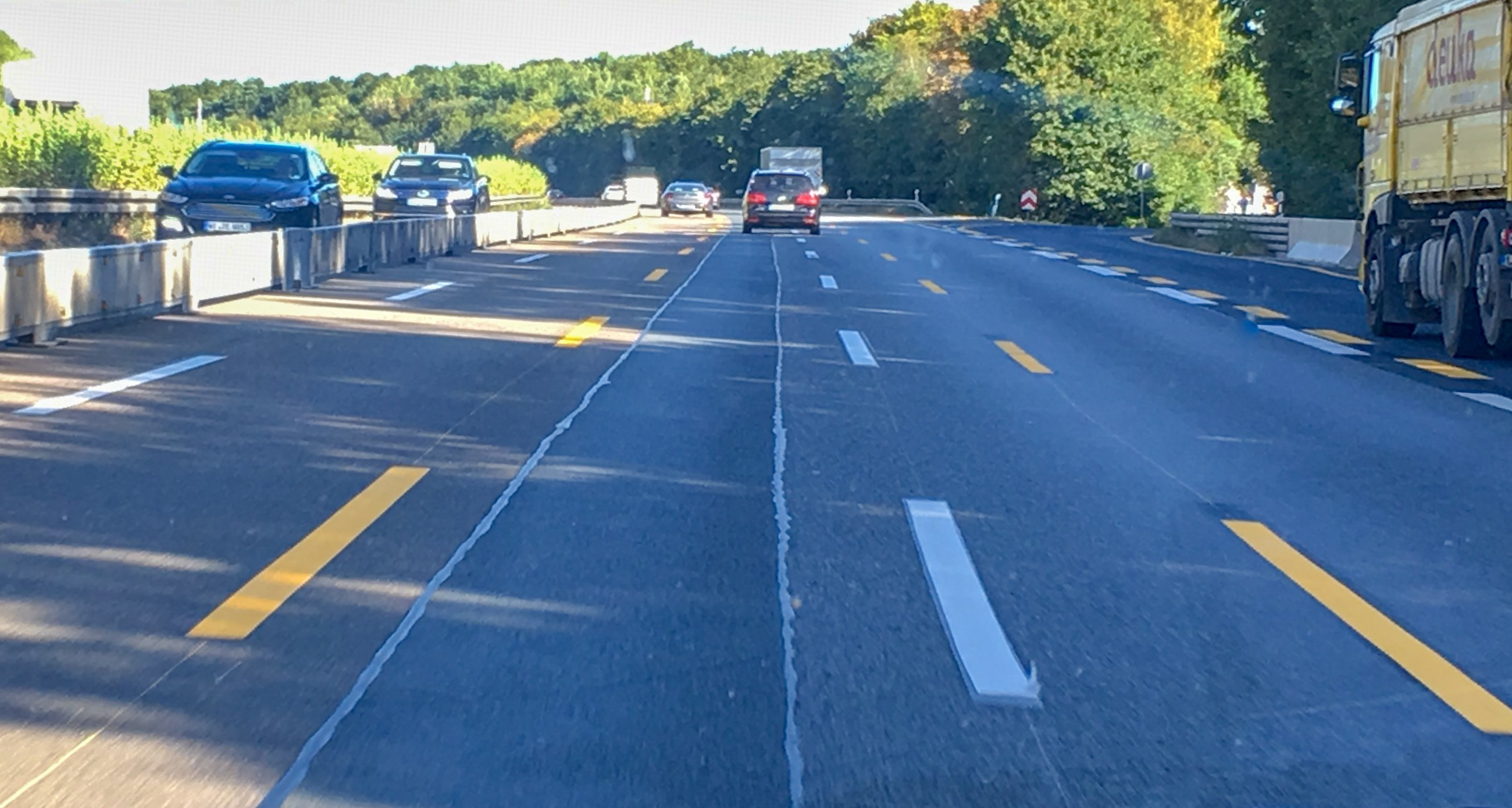
Germany: yellow lines on the road override white lines

In many continental European countries like the Czech Republic, Italy, Germany, France, Belgium, Poland, Slovakia and The Netherlands, yellow lines are not used for regular traffic regulation. However, during roadworks, temporary yellow lines overrule the usual white marking to guide vehicles through the site.

In Switzerland, yellow lines are used to delineate special lanes for specific types of vehicles, such as buses, taxis or bikes.

==== Ireland ====
In Ireland, yellow lines are used to mark the near side of the carriageway/shoulder. White lines are used between lanes (including centre lines) and on centre medians. Broken yellow lines may be crossed, but motorists may not cross solid yellow lines.

==== Israel ====
The right shoulders of the road are marked with a yellow solid line.

==== New Zealand ====
A solid yellow centre line must not be crossed except to turn into or out of a driveway. A broken yellow line next to the kerb indicates no stopping, while a broken yellow centre line indicates you are approaching a solid yellow centre line. A perpendicular yellow line at an intersection indicates a compulsory stop.

==== Philippines ====
In the Philippines, solid single yellow lines in some cities indicate bus lanes or bicycle lanes, which are restricted lanes for use solely by those vehicles. It is forbidden for vehicles on either side to cross the line. In certain areas, solid lines may give way to segmented single yellow lines which indicate that private vehicles may cross or merge into the bus lane, though buses are still forbidden from merging the other way. Buses still retain right-of-way in such cases.

==== Norway ====
Yellow lines are used to indicate that traffic on the other side of the line is going in the opposite direction. A solid yellow line indicates that crossing it to overtake is not allowed. A segmented yellow line, with a ratio of 3:1 of segment length to space length, indicates that crossing it to overtake is allowed, but may be dangerous, and caution should be exerted. A segmented yellow line, with a ratio of 1:3 of segment length to space length, indicates that crossing it to overtake is allowed. When there is a combined line, all the same rules apply to the line on the side closest to the driver.

Yellow lines can be used to designate the median regardless of if there is a physical barrier between the two combined lines. Yellow lines are also used on ramps and one-way roads, along the left edge of the road.

==== Canada ====
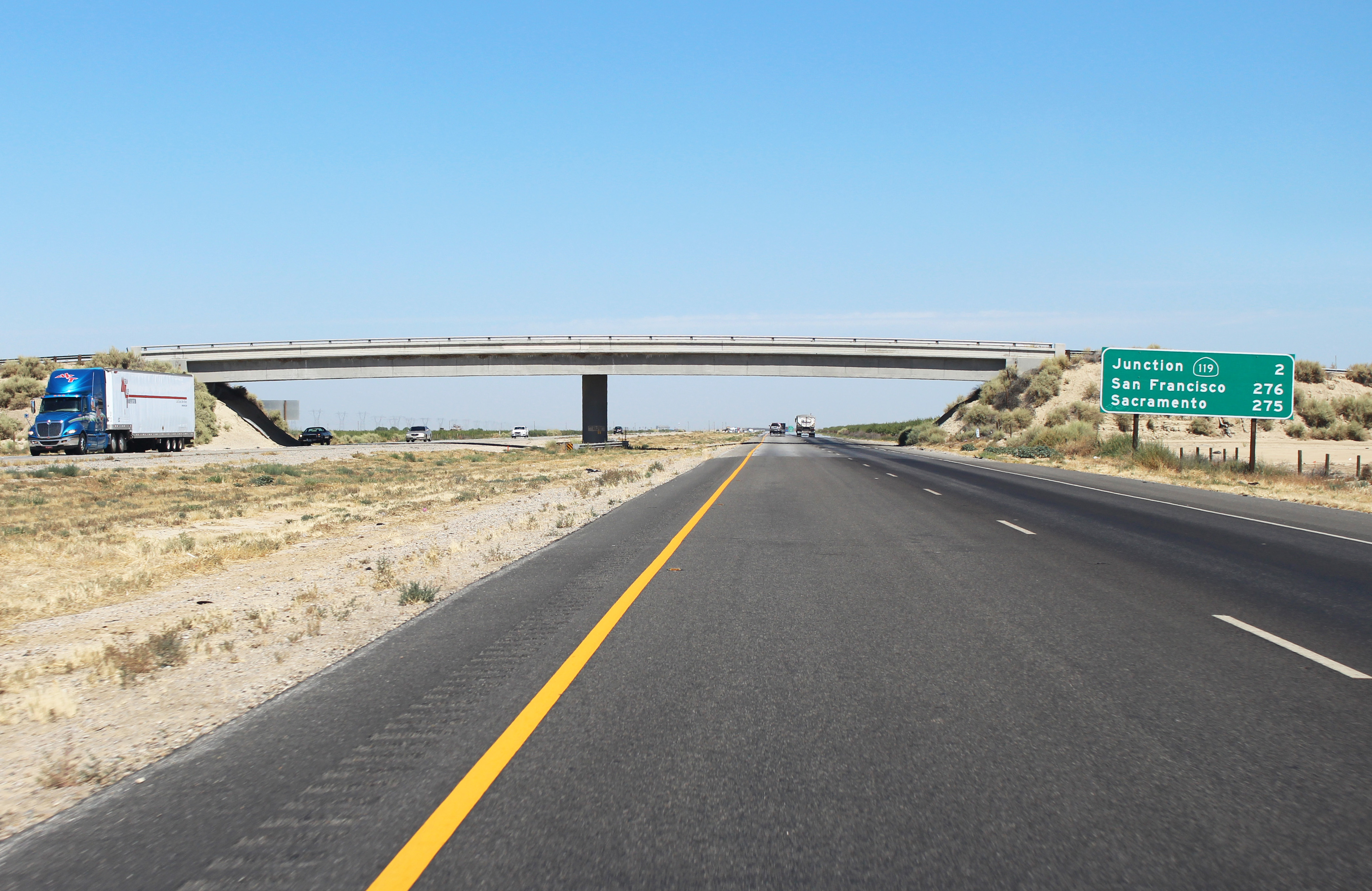
An example (on Interstate 5) of one of the two contexts in which a single solid yellow line can be legally used on American roads.

In Canada, a single broken yellow line is used to separate traffic coming from opposite directions and means that passing is allowed. The meaning of a single solid yellow line varies by province, as traffic laws are established at the provincial level rather than federally.

In Ontario, a solid yellow line is used to indicate that passing may be unsafe, but it is not in itself a legal prohibition; official guidance states that a solid line warns drivers that it is unsafe to pass.

In New Brunswick, a single solid yellow line indicates that passing is not permitted, according to the provincial driver's handbook.

Similarly, Prince Edward Island states that solid yellow lines indicate that passing is not safe and should not be attempted.

In Nova Scotia, drivers may cross a single solid yellow line to pass when it can be done safely, demonstrating further variation between provinces.

Due to these regional differences, no single interpretation of a solid yellow line applies uniformly across Canada.

Others

In the United States, single solid yellow lines are expressly prohibited on two-way undivided roadways by Section 3B.01 of the Manual on Uniform Traffic Control Devices. A single broken yellow line separates opposing traffic and means that passing with care is allowed for traffic in either direction. Section 3B.06 authorizes use of a single solid yellow line in only two contexts: on divided highways (that is, divided by a median strip) to mark the left side of the lane closest to the median (for traffic in both directions), and to mark the left side of the leftmost lane on one-way ramps.

In Indonesia, single and double yellow markings are used to mark the median of national roads (handled by Ministry of Public Works and Public Housing). Passing is allowed on broken single or double mark. For lane separation of national roads, white markings is still used. Provincial, city/regency, and local roads still use white markings for the median. Single markings are used for one lane, two way national roads.

== Double yellow lines ==
=== Australia ===
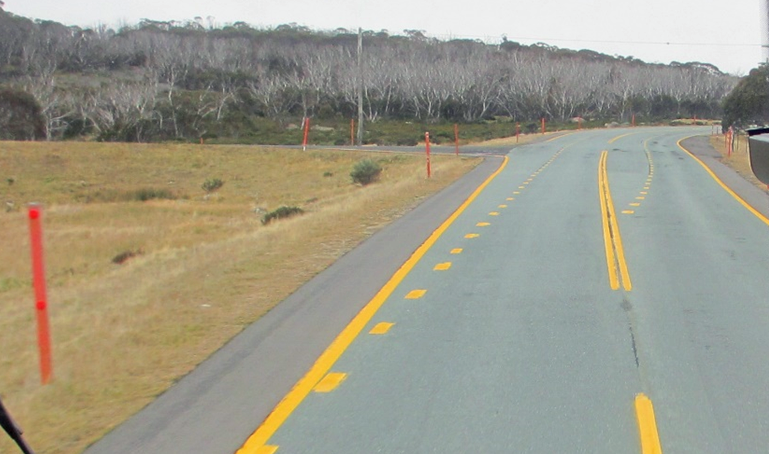
Yellow lines in Australia

Yellow road lines are used in the centre of the road in areas with large amounts of snow to contrast with the white colour of snow. These lines are white in areas where there is infrequent or no snow. Yellow road lines in Australia are also used in roadworks.

=== Central lines ===
==== Lebanon ====
In Lebanon, crossing a yellow line means you entered the area where traffic is coming from the opposite direction. A single solid yellow line means that passing is not advised but you may pass, with extreme caution. A single dashed yellow line means passing is allowed. A double solid yellow line means passing is not allowed under any circumstances. A double dashed line means passing is allowed only if there are no cars you can see coming from the opposite direction.

==== North America ====
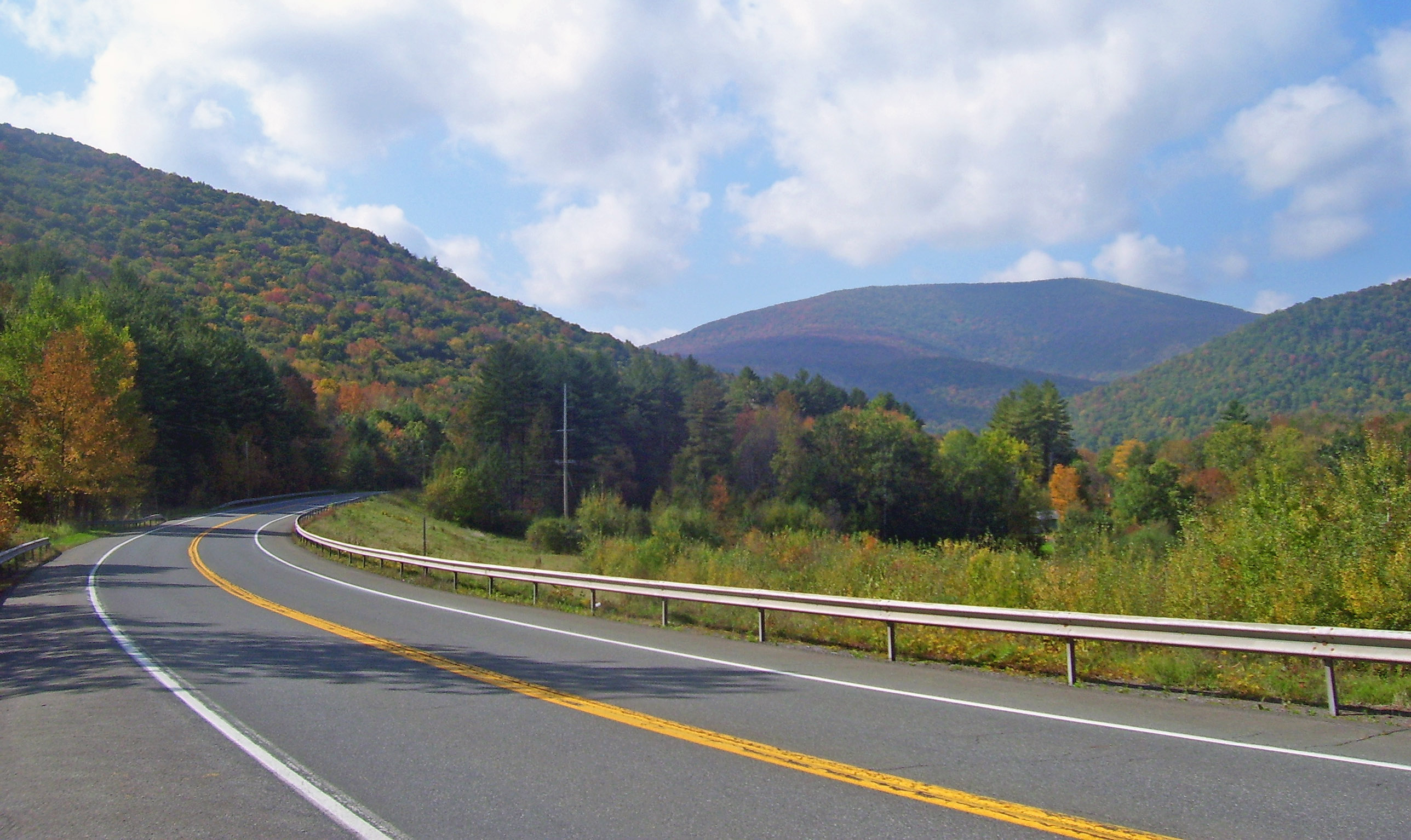
A double yellow center line in the United States indicates that passing is prohibited.

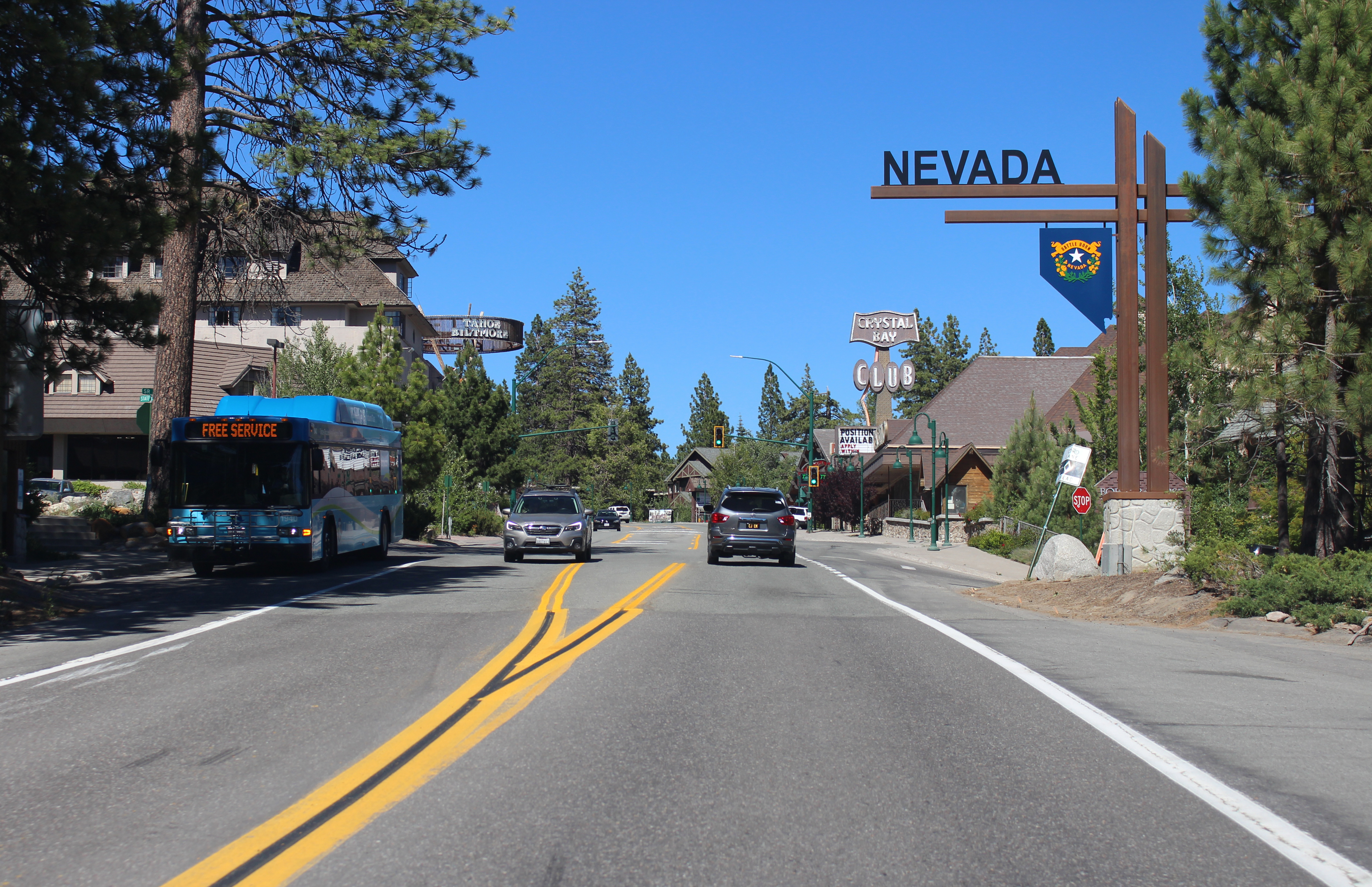
California (foreground) paints a black line to help drivers see a double yellow line, while Nevada (background) does not.

A yellow line (solid or dashed) indicates that crossing the line will place a driver in a lane where opposing traffic is coming at the driver. A double yellow line is a painted marking separating two lanes of a road. It consists of two parallel, solid yellow lines, and its presence indicates a two-direction no-passing restriction or no passing zone, where traffic in both directions is strictly prohibited from crossing the line to pass other traffic. Some states, like California, paint a black line down the middle to help drivers see the double yellow line. Where such a marking is present and one vehicle comes up behind another, the faster vehicle cannot cross the double yellow line to overtake the slower vehicle, must match its speed, and must follow the slower vehicle until they reach a passing zone or the slower vehicle turns off the road. There are four major exceptions to the rule against crossing a double yellow line: (1) turning left into a side street or driveway; (2) passing bicyclists or pedestrians (where they are obstructing through traffic on roads lacking a shoulder and/or a bike lane); (3) emergency maneuvers; and (4) temporary traffic flow changes due to road work. As with regular passing zones, opposing traffic always has right of way.

In rural areas, the double yellow line may have segments where one of the lines becomes dashed (in which case it is no longer a "double yellow"). This kind of marking designates a one-direction no-passing zone. Drivers traveling on the side closest to the dashed line may pass with care when safe, while drivers traveling on the side closest to the line that remains solid are prohibited from passing.

Two municipalities in the state of Rhode Island—Bristol and Warwick—replace the double yellow line with red, white, and blue striping along certain routes.

In some states, it is not against the law to overtake vehicles in the presence of solid yellow lines if it is safe to do so. For example, Vermont State Law also allows passing across the double yellow line when no traffic is on the opposing side, however, one must pass quickly and return to the proper side. Pennsylvania does permit passing on double yellow lines when not also posted with "Do Not Pass" signage. As of 2023, Oregon permits passing in any no passing zone if passing an obstruction (any type of vehicle, including bicycles) which is traveling at a speed less than 1/5 of the posted speed limit, so long as the passer remains at a speed that is 5 MPH below the posted speed limit. However, these states are unusual. Most states strictly enforce a ban on crossing a double yellow line (outside of the above-noted exceptions) and overtaking another vehicle across a solid yellow line is usually considered a serious traffic violation in most states.

Some parts of the US use a doubled set of double yellow lines (sometimes called "double-double yellow lines") to demarcate a painted median strip, which vehicles are not permitted to cross. This differs from a single set of double yellow lines, which may be crossed in certain circumstances.

In British Columbia, it is against the law to touch or cross a solid double yellow line at any time, except to avoid obstructions on the highway, or when a vehicle is entering or exiting the highway, if the vehicle can safely do so without affecting the flow of other vehicles.

==== Others ====
In the Philippines, double yellow lines (usually on either side of white segmented lines) indicate it is strictly forbidden for vehicles on either side of the lanes to overtake or counter-flow. These markings are commonly seen on blind curves and in bridges.

In India, double yellow line, in contrast with a double white line, indicates a no-passing restriction. Double white is just a no-passing suggestion.

In Norway, a double yellow line means that passing is forbidden in both directions.

=== Verge lines ===
Double yellow verge lines as a parking restriction were first introduced in the UK by section 51 of the Road Traffic Act 1960 (repealed in 1972 and replaced by later legislation).

Countries that were once part of the British Empire are likely to retain a modified version of the British laws including the basic principles regarding road safety. The countries that use double yellow lines include:

- Hong Kong (no stopping restriction)
- Republic of Ireland
- Malaysia, especially in major towns like Kuala Lumpur
- Malta (no stopping)
- Mauritius
- Singapore

==== United Kingdom ====
Double yellow lines in the UK indicate that parking is prohibited.

Double yellow lines along the edge of the carriageway indicate that waiting restrictions apply to the road (which includes the carriageway, footway and verge). Double yellow lines mean no waiting at any time, unless there are signs that specifically indicate seasonal restrictions. A driver may stop for passengers to board or alight and to load or unload (unless there are also 'loading restrictions' - see below). The regulation applies to all vehicles. The restriction applies from the centre of the carriageway to the back of the footway.

Loading and unloading is allowed on double yellow lines at any time, unless there are additional markings indicating that there are 'loading restrictions'. A single short yellow stripe at regular intervals across the kerb or edge of the carriageway indicates that loading and unloading is not permitted at the times shown on accompanying black and white sign plates. Two short yellow stripes at regular intervals across the kerb or edge of the carriageway indicate that loading and unloading is not permitted at any time (and the sign plates may be omitted). Loading/unloading time may be restricted, depending upon the local authority making the restriction. One must not cause an obstruction to traffic or pedestrians.

== Safety issues ==
The paint used for yellow line road markings can contain chromate pigment, which may cause urban pollution as it deteriorates. Hexavalent chromium in dust can cause dermatitis ulceration on the skin, inflammation of the nasal mucosa and larynx, and lung cancer.

== See also ==
- Highway Code
- Red route
