= Traffic Management Act 2004 =

Act of the Parliament of the United Kingdom

Traffic Management Act 2004 (Note: Section 100(1).)
- Act of Parliament
- Parliament of the United Kingdom
- Long title: An Act to make provision for and in connection with the designation of traffic officers and their duties; to make provision in relation to the management of road networks; to make new provision for regulating the carrying out of works and other activities in the street; to amend Part 3 of the New Roads and Street Works Act 1991 and Parts 9 and 14 of the Highways Act 1980; to make new provision in relation to the civil enforcement of traffic contraventions; to amend section 55 of the Road Traffic Regulation Act 1984; and for connected purposes.
- Citation: 2004 c. 18
- Territorial extent: England and Wales (Note: Section 100(2).)

Dates
- Royal assent: 22 July 2004
- Commencement: Various (Note: Section 99.)
Other legislation
Amends	Highways Act 1980; Road Traffic Regulation Act 1984; New Roads and Street Works Act 1991
Amended by	Infrastructure Act 2015

Status: Amended

Text of statute as originally enacted

Revised text of statute as amended

The Traffic Management Act 2004 (c. 18) is an act of the Parliament of the United Kingdom. It sets out how road networks should be managed by local authorities and includes regulations for roadworks. The act has been implemented from 1 April 2008 across the United Kingdom.

== Provisions ==
The act gave powers to local authorities and the Highway Agency to manage the powers to patrol motorways to respond to incidents and breakdowns on the motorways so that movement can be restored.

=== Part 2 - Network Management ===
This section sets out the network management duty to "secure the expeditious movement of traffic", which is defined as pedestrians as well as vehicles.

=== Parts 3 and 4 - Permits and Street Works ===
All the parties interested in occupying streets/highways need to follow the specified guidelines. The main highlights are as follows:

- Effective communication between highway authorities and parties interested in carrying out street work
- Powers given to highway authorities to impose fixed charges in case of any failure to follow the guidelines
- Disciplined approach and advance communication to plan the street works
- Introduction of web services for communication
- Introduction of Level 3 National Street Gazetteer data
- Explicit provision of cancelling/correcting or reverting the work status.

The second wave of the Traffic Management Act 2004 aims to implement permit regulation. As part of this regulation work undertakers have to apply for a permit to work on a street. Undertaker have to discuss and agree the restriction on work timing, apparatus etc. with highway authorities. The highway authorities should approve/reject the application after verifying the permit conditions.

=== Part 5 ===
This allows Transport for London to designate a strategic road network in Greater London, and covers other matters.

=== Part 6 - Civil enforcement of traffic contraventions ===
This part covers contraventions such as vehicles parking incorrectly or using bus lanes. These are enforced by penalty charge notices.

=== Part 7 ===
==== Section 99 - Commencement, transitionals and savings ====
The following orders have been made under this section:

- The Traffic Management Act 2004 (Commencement No. 1 and Transitional Provision) (England) Order 2004 (SI 2004/2380 (C. 102))
- The Traffic Management Act 2004 (Commencement No. 2) (England) Order 2004 (SI 2004/3110 (C. 130))
- The Traffic Management Act 2004 (Commencement No. 3) (England) Order 2006 (SI 2006/1736 (C. 60))
- The Traffic Management Act 2004 (Commencement No. 4 and Transitional Provisions) (England) Order 2007 (SI 2007/1890 (C. 71))
- The Traffic Management Act 2004 (Commencement No. 5 and Transitional Provisions) (England) Order 2007 (SI 2007/2053 (C. 78))
- The Traffic Management Act 2004 (Commencement No. 5 and Transitional Provisions) (England) (Amendment) Order 2008 (SI 2008/757 (C. 35))
- The Traffic Management Act 2004 (Commencement No. 6) (England) Order 2007 (SI 2007/3184 (C. 131))
- The Traffic Management Act 2004 (Commencement No. 1) (Wales) Order 2006 (SI 2006/2826 (W. 249) (C. 97))
- The Traffic Management Act 2004 (Commencement No. 2 and Transitional Provisions) (Wales) Order 2007 (SI 2007/3174 (W. 279))
- The Traffic Management Act 2004 (Commencement No. 3) (Wales) Order 2009 (SI 2009/1095 (W. 98))

== Reception ==
The Labour MP Gwyneth Dunwoody described it as allowing "people involved in serious accidents to escape prosecution" but allowing others who had been "hard done by" to lack any recourse or any kind of appeal.

Damian Green, the Shadow Secretary of State for Transport described it as creating more "bureaucracy", more "confusion", "anger" for motorists. He also described the plans for lane rental as "just another way of increasing taxes" on utilities.
