= Pay-by-plate parking =

Parking payment system

Pay-by-plate machines are a subset of ticket machines used for regulating parking in urban areas or parking lots. They enable customers to purchase parking time by using their license plate number. The machines print a receipt that generally displays the location, machine number, start time, expiration time, amount paid, and license plate.

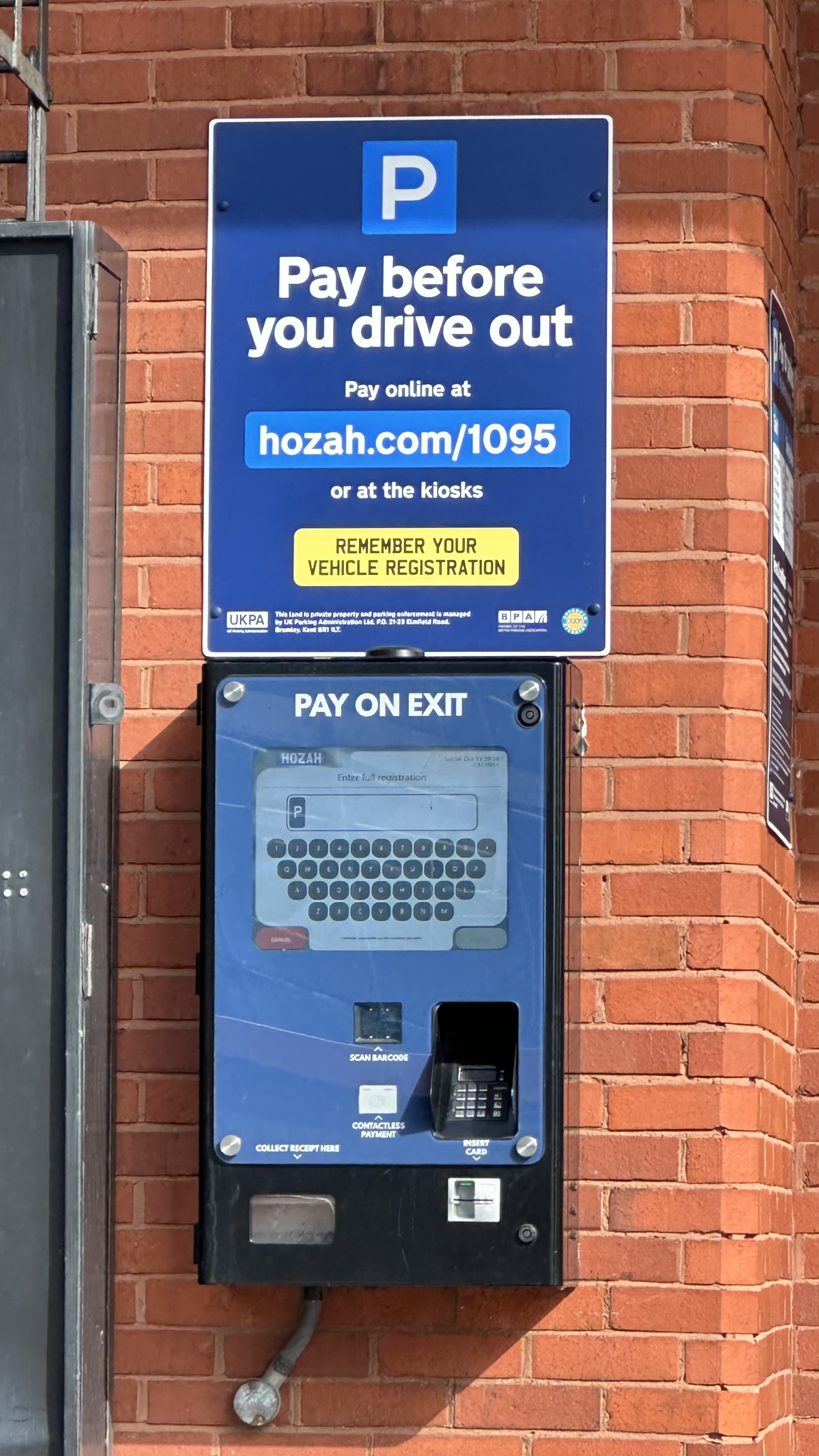
Hozah "pay before you drive out" machine in Chatham, Kent, England

== Principles ==
The pay-by-plate system is a parking payment method designed to serve multiple vehicles by requiring the driver to input the license plate information into a machine. It prevents drivers from benefiting from any remaining time on parking meters.

In some urban areas, pay-by-plate systems have replaced roadside parking meters and pay and display machines.

Pay-by-plate systems often provide the ability of purchasing parking time by phone. This means that drivers can extend their parking session remotely without needing to return to the payment machine. Moreover, pay-by-plate machines typically accept different forms of payment, including coins, credit cards, debit cards, and NFC for smartphone payments.

=== Enforcement ===
The enforcement of license plates in parking systems typically occurs through one of three methods: manual plate entry into a handheld device, Automated License Plate Recognition (ALPR) implemented in a handheld device, or vehicle-mounted ALPR systems.

Enforcement officers input the license plate information manually or automatically, depending on the technology used. The system then cross-references this information with payment records to verify if the vehicle is parked legally. Vehicles found to be parked illegally are issued citations either in real-time, directly on the windshield, or through a post-processed mail-out method.

Payments are collected from different sources such as phone payments and on-street payment machines. This process enables parking enforcement officers to determine which vehicles have not complied with parking regulations.

==== Handheld ====
Manual handheld devices rely on the user's input of license plate information and are susceptible to human error during data entry. Unlike handheld ALPR systems, they lack photographic evidence unless a separate photo is taken.

Handheld ALPR devices come in two variations: those that capture single-shot pictures for ALPR analysis and those that use live video mode to analyze a stream of images. Single-shot devices have access to the full resolution of the camera but take longer to process, while live video mode devices are limited to the resolution of the video stream but can analyze multiple images from slightly different angles. Currently, there is no conclusive study on which method yields the best ALPR read on a handheld device.

Despite these considerations, handheld devices offer advantages over vehicle-mounted systems in terms of cost-effectiveness and the ability to enforce parking violations in tight spaces, which sometimes can be inaccessible to enforcement vehicles. Additionally, in regions where license plates are only displayed on the rear of vehicles, handheld ALPR systems are necessary as vehicle-mounted ALPR becomes impractical for vehicles parked in reverse. However, handheld systems cannot match the efficiency of vehicle-mounted ALPR systems, which can operate at speeds of up to 60 km/h.

==== Vehicle Mounted ALPR ====
Payments are sent over web APIs. ALPR-enabled parking enforcement vehicles are capable of traveling at speeds exceeding 60 km/h, scanning multiple license plates per second and cross-referencing them with payment records to verify compliance.

While handheld systems cannot match the efficiency of vehicle-mounted ALPR systems, the latter typically entail significantly higher costs. Moreover, vehicle-mounted ALPR systems may not be suitable for all areas, particularly those where enforcement vehicles are unable to capture license plate information due to factors such as parking angles, plate placement, or road geometry. In such scenarios, handheld ALPR devices offer a more practical solution for enforcement.

== Installations ==
In Canada, the first pay-by-plate system was unveiled in Calgary, AB on September 20, 2007.

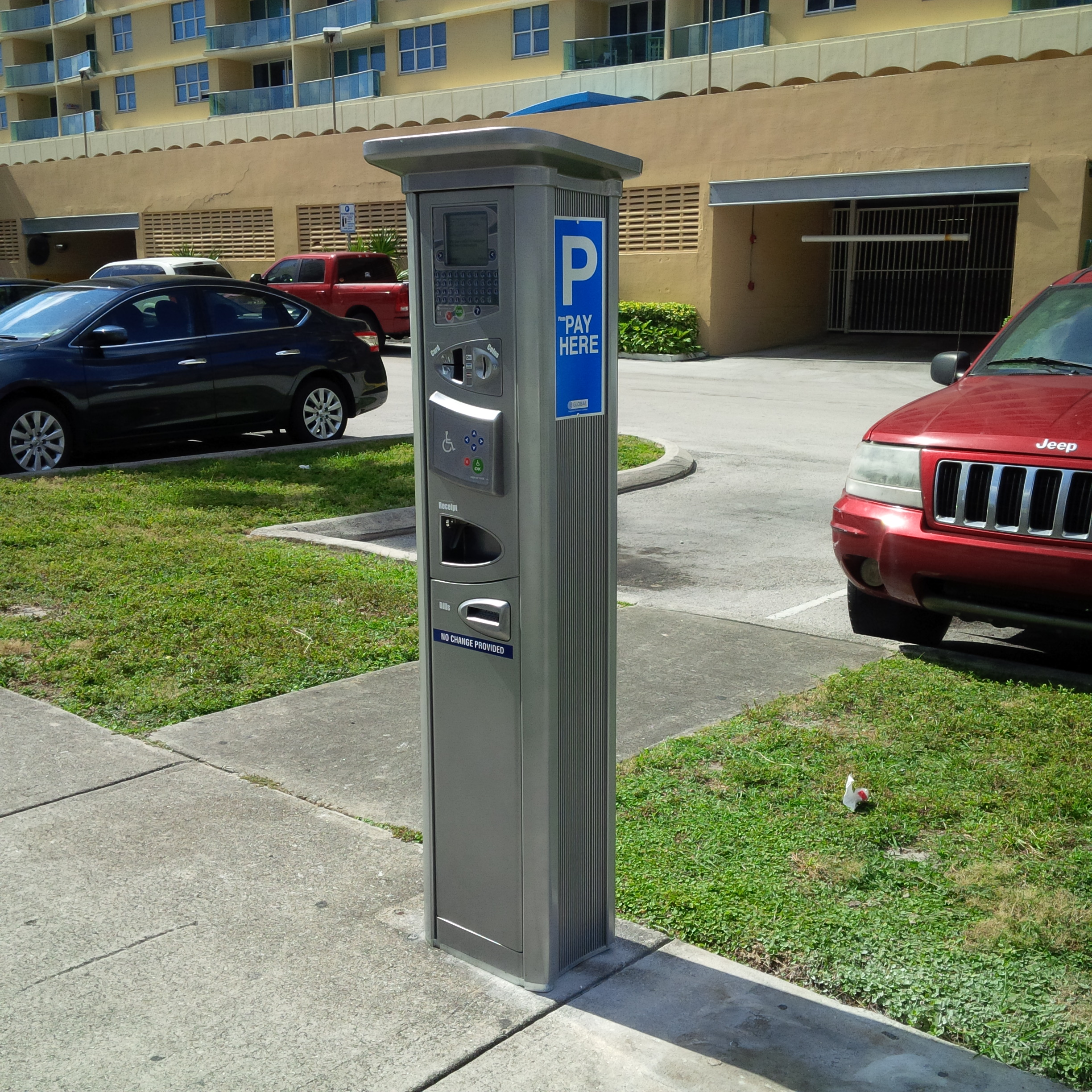
Global Parking Solutions Metropolis Pay-By-Plate terminal

Pittsburgh, PA is implementing the largest pay-by-plate parking terminal project in the USA. This project started on July 26, 2012. As of January 2013, Pittsburgh Parking Authority has completed the installation of 550+ pay-by-plate parking terminals. Every parking terminal is modem enabled, and is transmitting all payments for parking in real-time.

As of May 2024, the New York City Department of Transportation (NYC DOT) began installing new pay-by-plate parking meters across the city.

== See also ==
- Decriminalised parking enforcement
- Parking guidance and information
- Automatic number-plate recognition
