= In-vehicle parking meter =

Parking permit device

An example of an in-vehicle parking meter, the EasyPark device by Parx.

An in-vehicle parking meter (IVPM) (also known as in-vehicle personal meter, in-car parking meter, or personal parking meter) is a handheld electronic device, roughly the size of a pocket calculator, that drivers display in their car windows either as a parking permit or as proof of parking payment. IVPM was first implemented in the late 1980s in Arlington, VA, and is spreading to campuses and municipalities worldwide as a centralized method of parking management, revenue collection, and compliance enforcement.

== History ==
Implementation of IVPM began in the late 1980s in Arlington, VA, and is spreading to campuses and municipalities worldwide as a centralized method of parking management, revenue collection, and compliance enforcement.

== Uses ==
=== Management ===
Parking managers who implement IVPM are able to combine all permit and pay-for-parking needs into one centralized system, which tracks data on where and for how long drivers are parking in specific locations. IVPMs can be customized based on a parking department's needs for what level of authority is parking, where they park, when they park, how long they park, and how much they are charged.

=== Payment ===
Depending on the entity where IVPM is implemented, drivers either use their debit cards to load funds onto their IVPMs through their computers at home or parking offices distribute the IVPMs to drivers with preloaded permit restrictions. The IVPM only charges drivers for the amount of time they have the device turned on, as opposed to traditional meters that drivers put coins into and return with extra time leftover. This feature eliminates "meter anxiety," a term coined by Professor Donald Shoup of the University of California that refers to a driver's mental stress of having to return to his or her vehicle before the meter expires. This also ensures drivers who overpay will not overstay, meaning the IVPM is only deducting funds for as long as the driver is outside the vehicle, as opposed to conventional meters that a driver may deposit too much funding into and stay longer than needed. Another IVPM payment method is pay by phone parking, which allows drivers to add parking time through their smartphones.

A driver hangs his in-vehicle parking meter in the window for enforcement officers to see.

=== Enforcement ===
Parking enforcers see visually on each IVPM whether a driver has sufficient funds or is parked in a restricted zone. Each distributed IVPM has a personal identification number specific to the registered driver to prevent parking fraud. Most IVPMs are equipped with near field communication to open gates and for parking enforcers to make sure a driver has turned on the device in the event that the window is covered by snow.

=== Sustainability ===
IVPMs typically have an 8-to-10-year lifespan and do not require the use of disposable paper receipts or plastic permits and decals that are associated with conventional parking management methods. Unlike traditional parking meters that require attendants to periodically withdraw funds, there is no infrastructure required to collect IVPM funds and no need for regular maintenance. Cities avoid the need to install meters, collect and count coins, and repair units.
