= Flowbird =

French parking meter company

Flowbird Group
- Company type: Société anonyme
- Industry: Payment system
- Founded: 2003; 23 years ago, in Paris, France
- Defunct: January 2025
- Headquarters: 15th arrondissement, Paris, France
- Key people: Bertrand Barthélemy (Chairman of the board)
- Products: Parking meter, Fare collection systems
- Owner: EasyPark Group; (2025–present)
- Number of employees: 1,300
- Website: www.flowbird.group

Flowbird is a French company specializing in payment and ticketing systems, notably for car parks and public transport systems. It has been owned the Easy Park Group (now Arrive) since 2025.

== History ==
The company was formed by the merger of Parkeon and Cale in 2018. Parkeon formed as a spin-off from Schlumberger in 2003.

On January 25, 2025, it was announced that the French firm had been acquired by the EasyPark Group, owner of the RingGo service.
