= On-street parking sensing =

Detection of available parking spots

On-street parking sensing refers to technologies used to obtain and present real-time parking availability information. Approaches to the problem of finding a free parking spot include analytics and advanced hardware systems.

The advent of autonomous cars is creating a second wave of demand for such data.

== Approaches ==
=== Smartphone data analytics ===
Adoption of smartphones by drivers allows tracking vehicle movement through accelerometer and GPS data and thus derive parking session start and end time. Combined with parking capacity data, this allows an estimation of real-time parking availability. Google Maps announced this functionality in 2017 based on historical data gathered from phones with location services turned on. Although zero infrastructure cost and general principle is appealing, lack of penetration among drivers and smartphone sensor data interpretation uncertainty limits the prediction accuracy.

=== Camera analytics ===
One approach is to use computer vision to derive automated parking occupancy estimates from on-street cameras. Solutions include video and snapshot analytics with cloud and onboard processing. This approach offers higher accuracy and potential cost-sharing given multi-purpose camera use for somewhat higher infrastructure cost and limited accuracy at night and in bad weather conditions. Cloud processing solutions have data traffic requirements starting from 10Gb/month. Onboard processing systems have lower data requirements but require more powerful (and expensive) hardware.

=== Lamp post radars ===
Ultrasonic and electromagnetic rangefinders mounted on lamp posts and other street infrastructure can detect parking events. The sensing unit cost is lower than for cameras but shorter sensing range, making the overall system metrics close to camera analytics in terms of accuracy and cost.

=== On-stall road sensors ===
San Francisco and Los Angeles have tried pilot programs to gather parking space occupancy data via sensors and smart parking meters, as part of matching parking prices with demand. Battery powered sensing unit installed flush or surface mount in parking spaces using magnetic, infrared and/or ultrasound. High spatial resolution and close proximity provide higher accuracy than camera analytics and radars. Road works and wireless infrastructure deployment make overall system roll out more difficult to manage.

== See also ==
- Parking guidance and information
- Intelligent transportation system
- Smart city
- Surveillance issues in smart cities
