= Pay and display =

Type of urban parking ticket machine

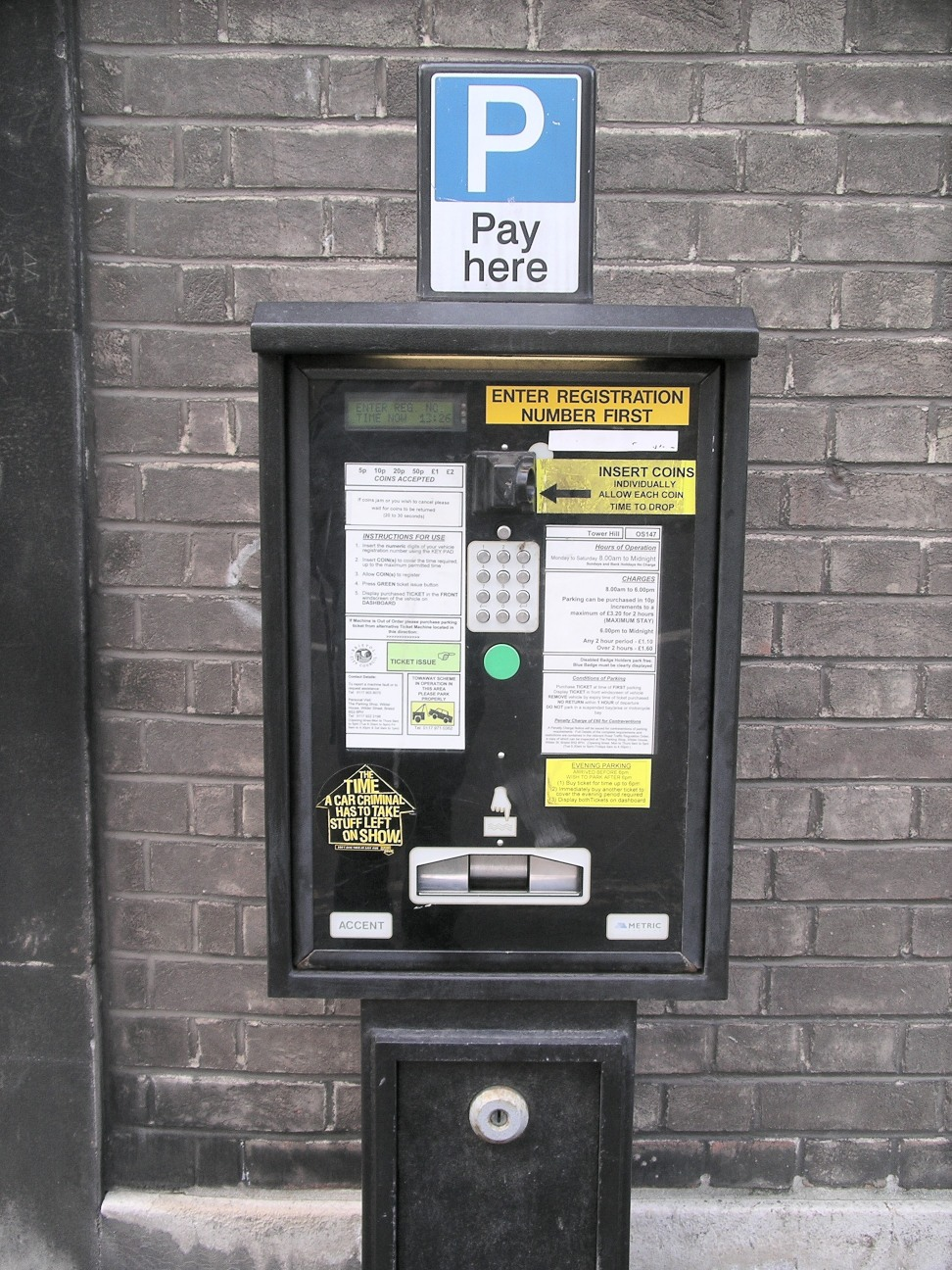
Metric Accent Pay and display ticket machine, Bristol City centre

A pay and display machine is a type of ticket machine used for regulating parking in urban areas or in car parks. It relies on a customer purchasing a ticket from a machine and displaying the ticket on the dashboard, windscreen or passenger window of the vehicle. Details included on a printed ticket are generally the location and operator of the machine, expiry time, fee paid and time entered.

== Systems ==
The first generation of pay and display machines in the United States was introduced in 1950 by Park-UR-Self, based in San Francisco, California. Park-Ur-Self has grown to become the leading manufacturer of pay and display machines in the United States and now goes by the name Ventek International.

=== Pay and display ===
Pay and display systems differ from road-side parking meters in that one machine can service multiple vehicle spaces, resulting in lower set up costs. In addition, this system theoretically prevents drivers from taking advantage of parking meters that have time remaining; this factor alone has doubled parking revenues in cities that have switched to pay and display. A driver may occasionally take advantage of remaining time should a departing parker give away a ticket with remaining time. This can be prevented by putting the license plate number on the ticket.

In addition, pay and display machines can also accept a wider variety of coins, and many even accept credit cards, making it unnecessary for drivers to carry large amounts of change. The use of credit cards has another advantage - the machines do not have to be emptied of coins as often, and the costs of counting coin and possible pilfering by employees who empty the parking meters also reduces their overall costs.

In the UK pay and display is used for both on-street parking control and parking in car parks and multi-storey car parks where access barrier systems are not installed.

==== Machines ====
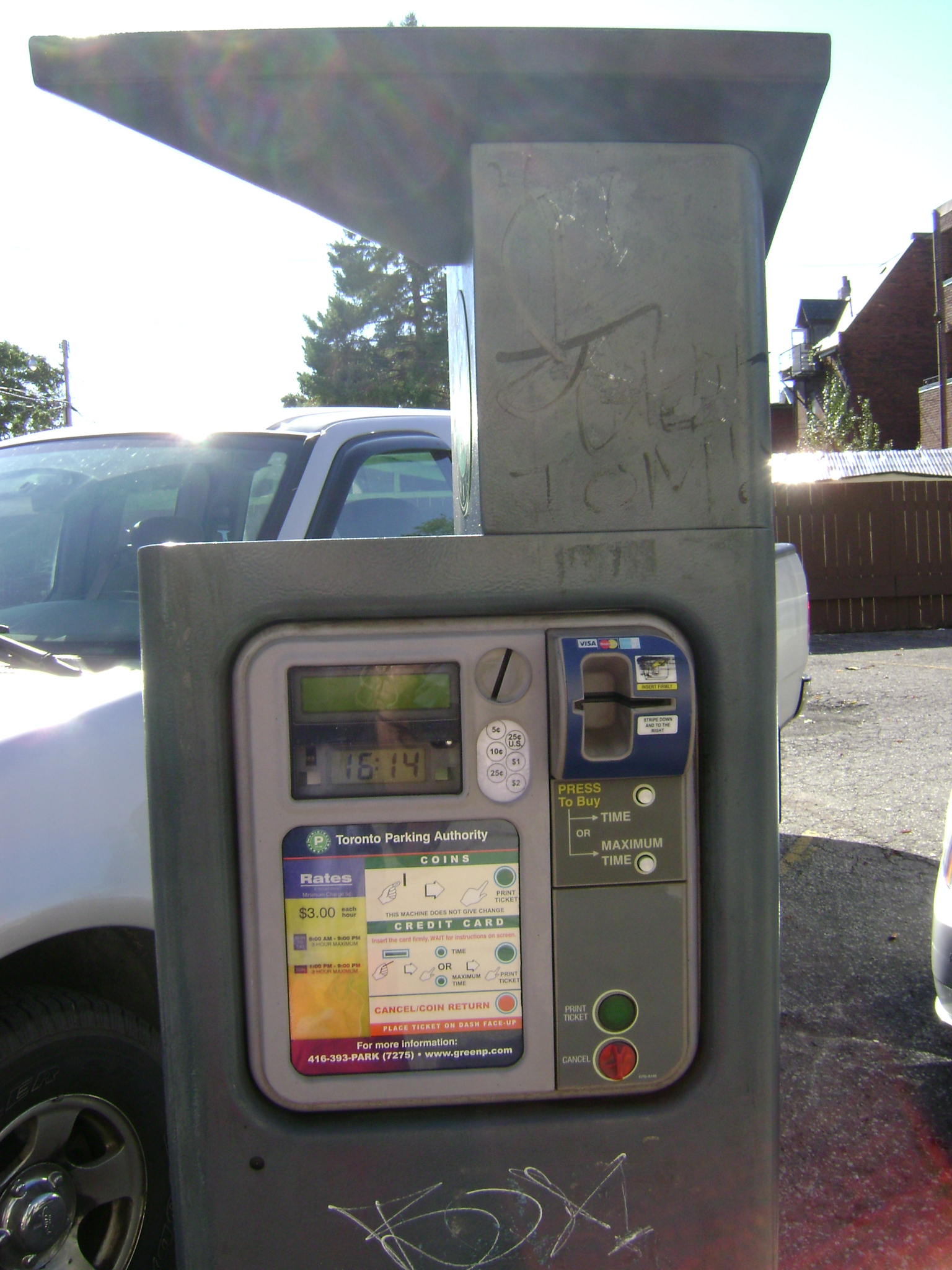
A machine in Canada operated by the Toronto Parking Authority

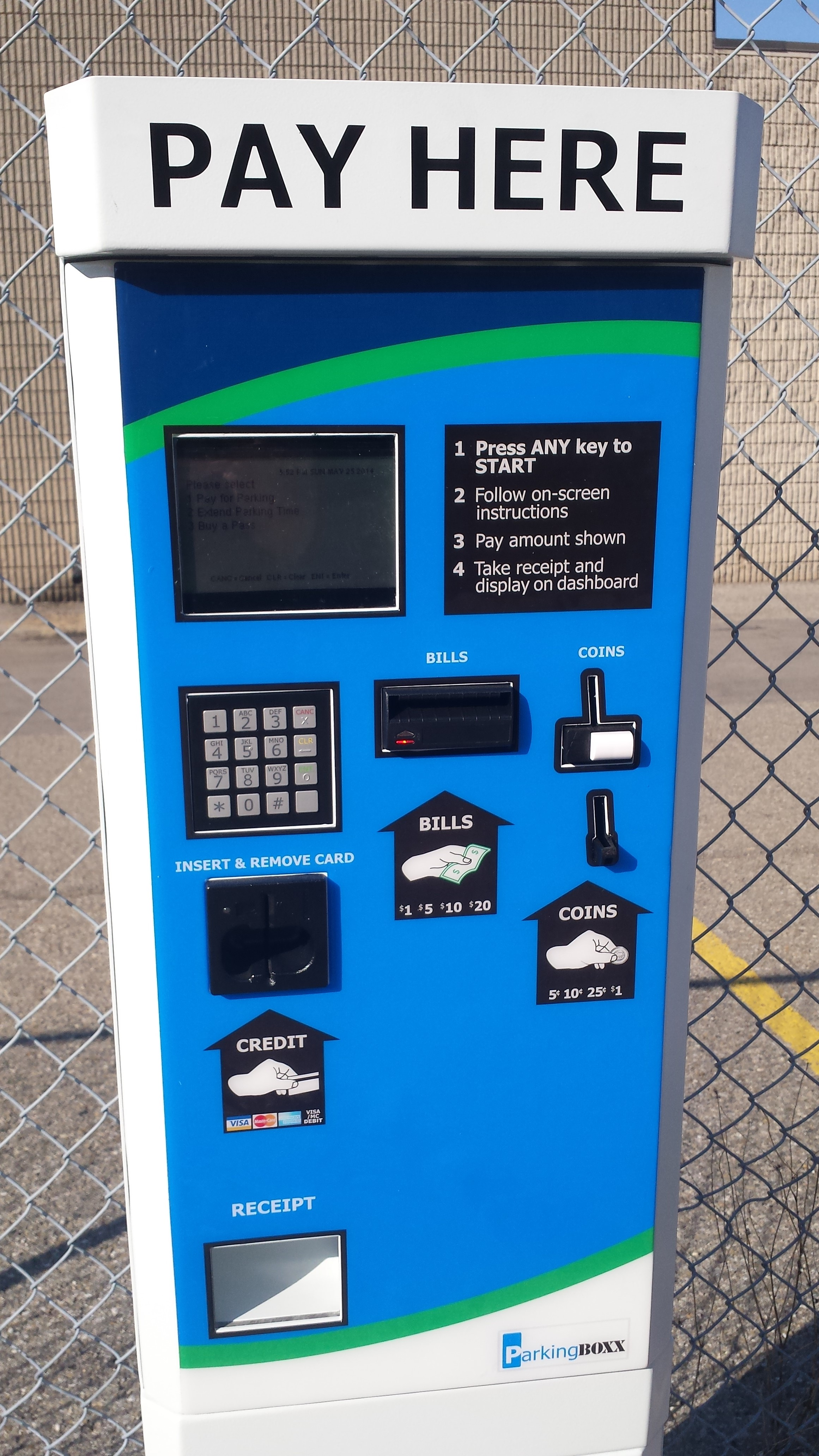
Example of a machine which accepts not only coins, but bills, credit, debit and prepaid cards

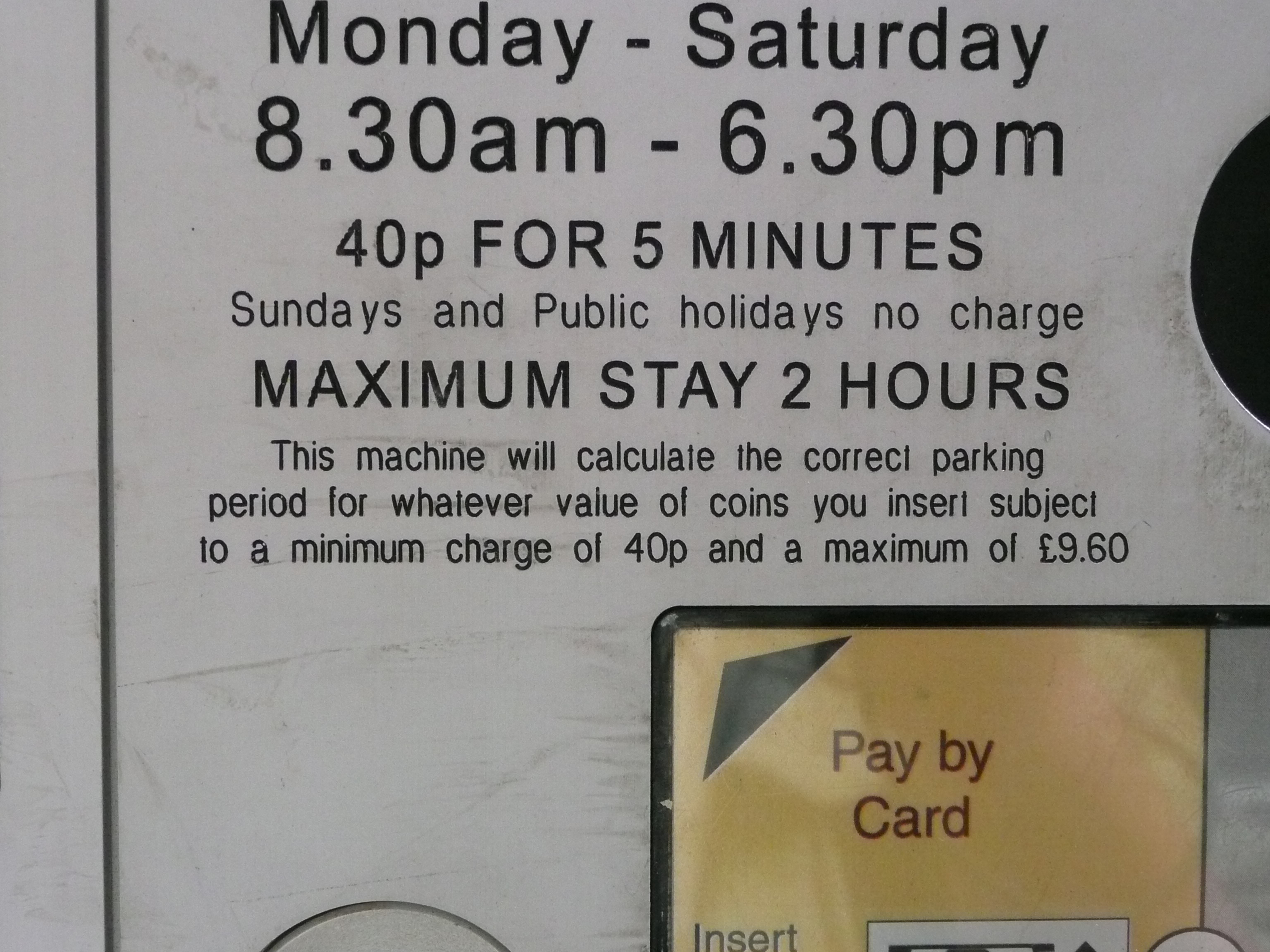
Message reads "This machine will calculate the correct parking period for whatever value of coins you insert subject to a minimum charge of 40p and a maximum of £9.60"

==== Tickets ====
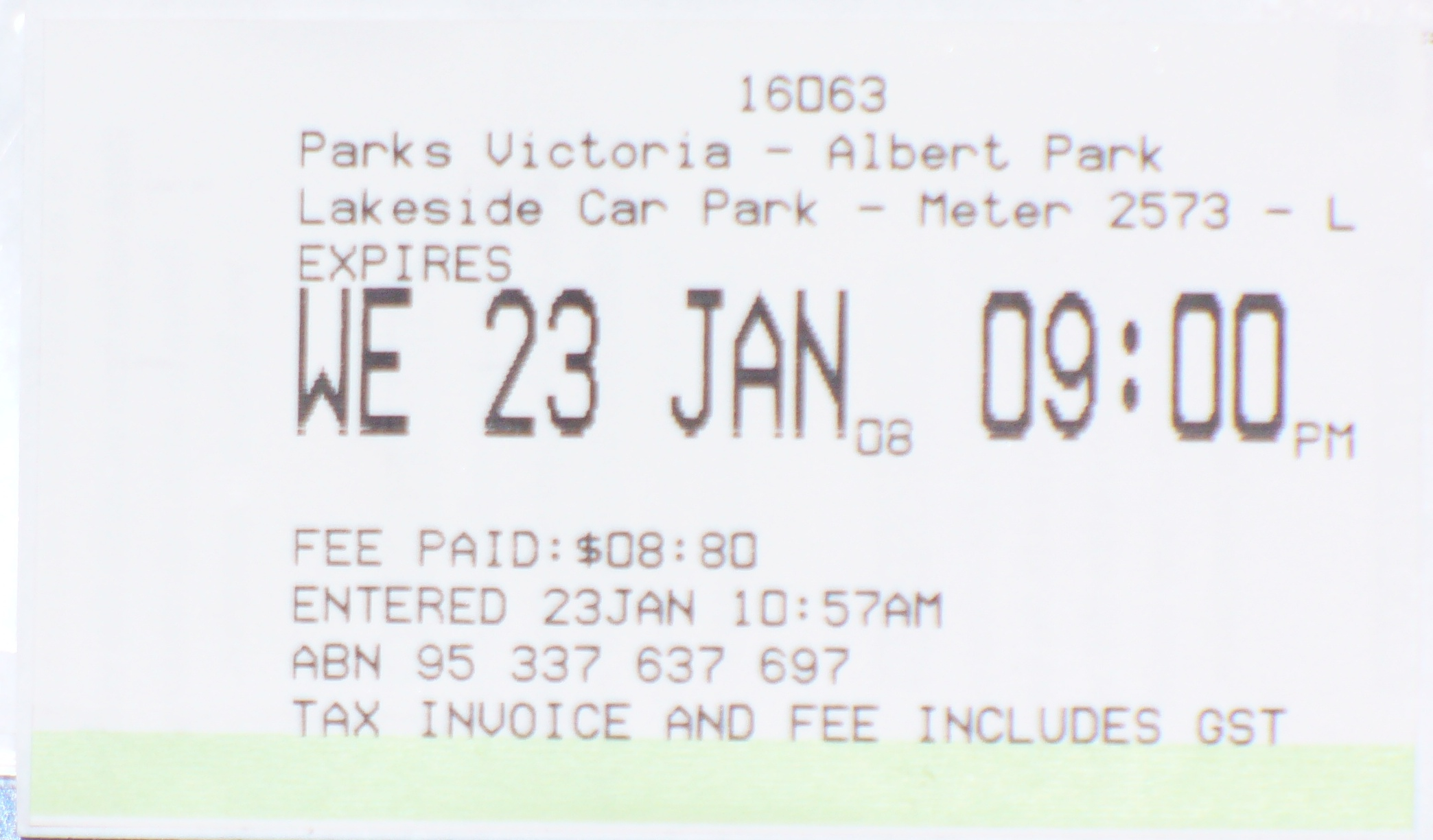
An Australian pay and display ticket, issued by a Reino machine

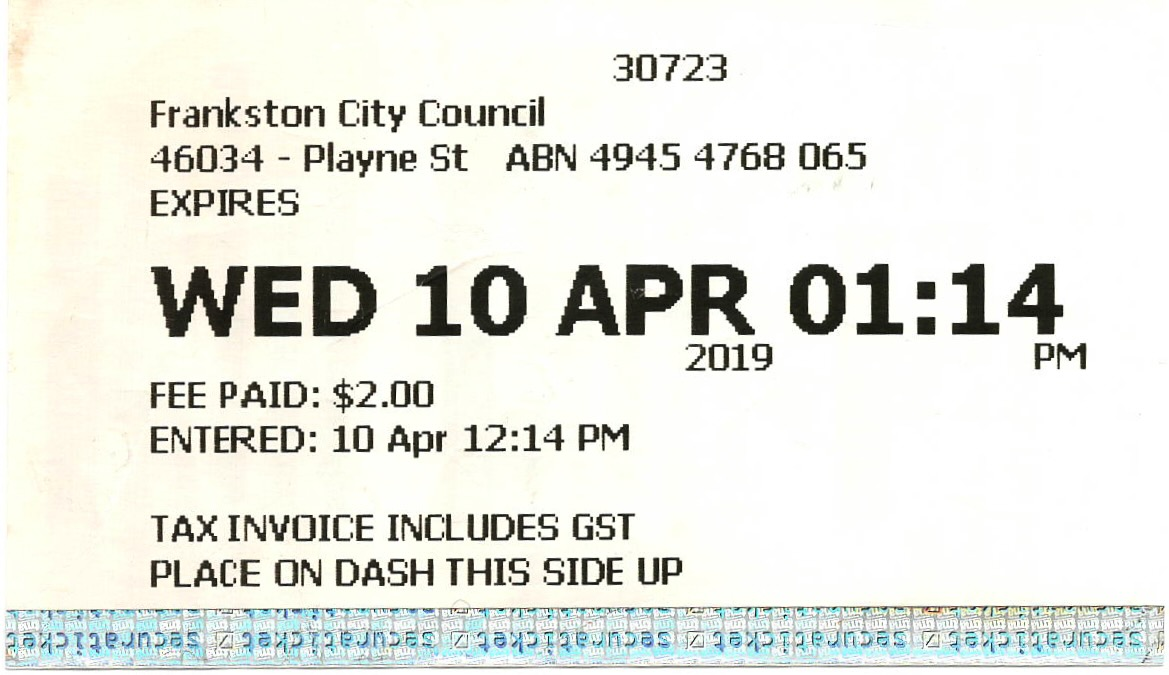
Australian pay and display ticket

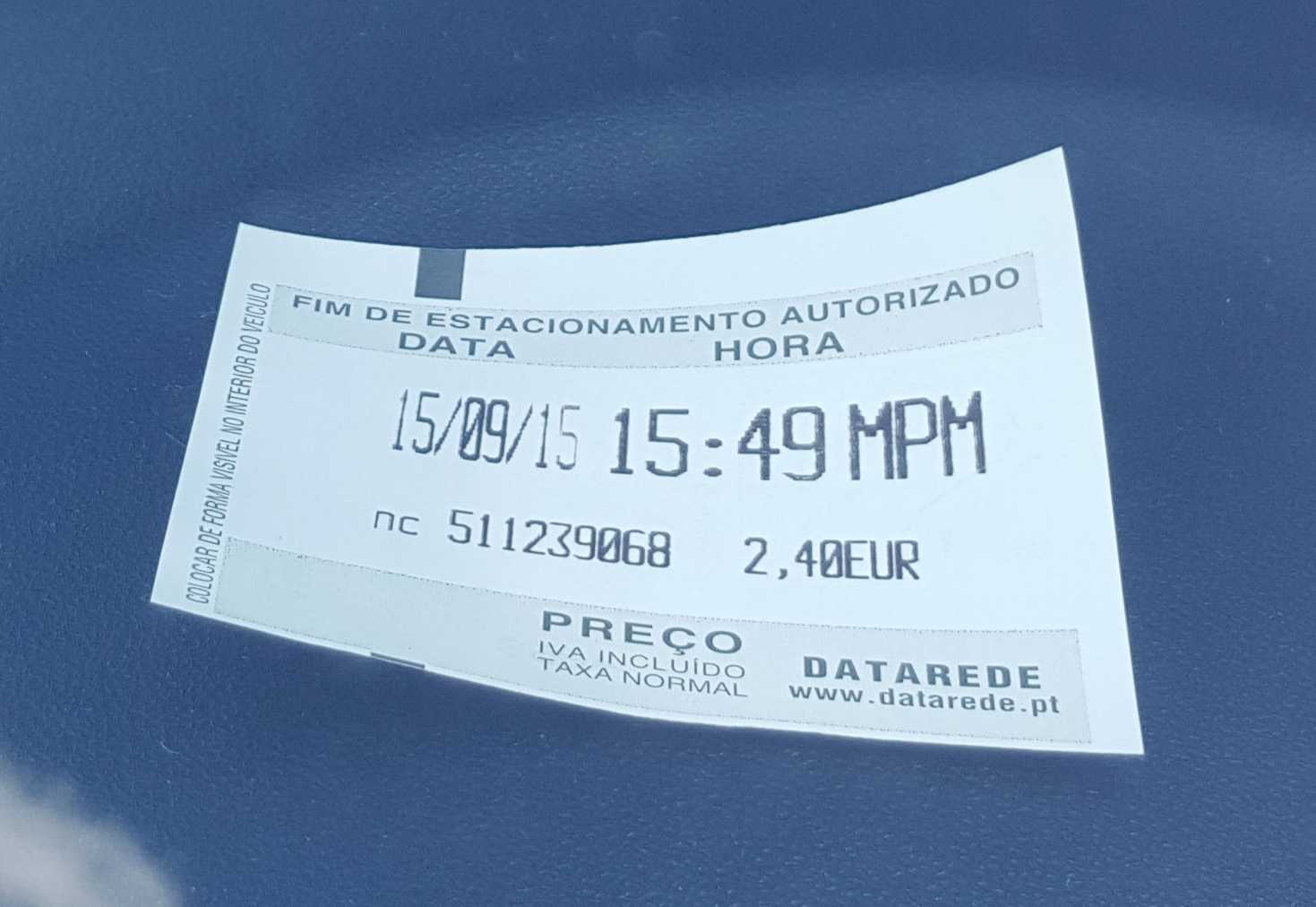
Portuguese pay and display ticket on dashboard of vehicle

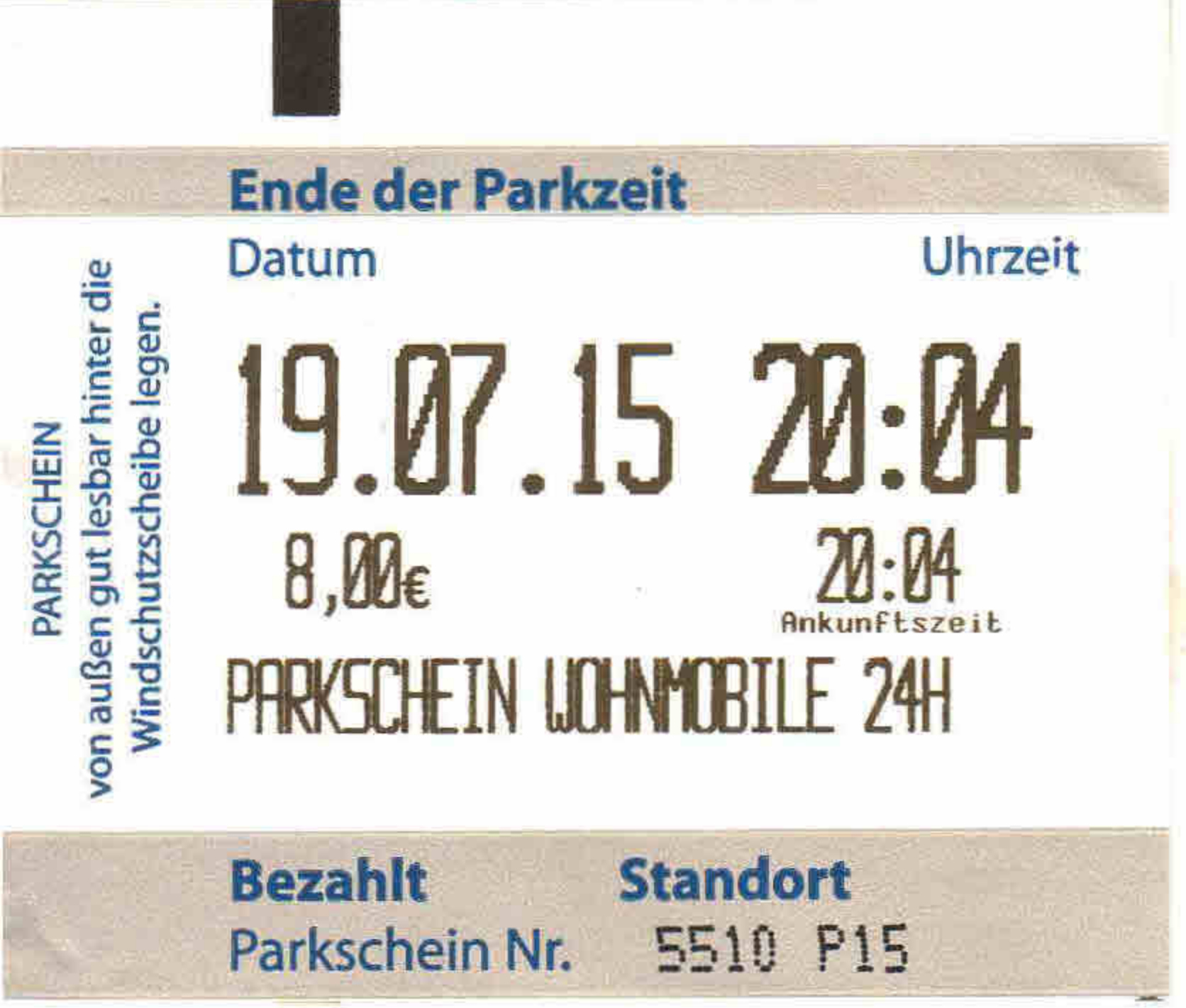
German ticket

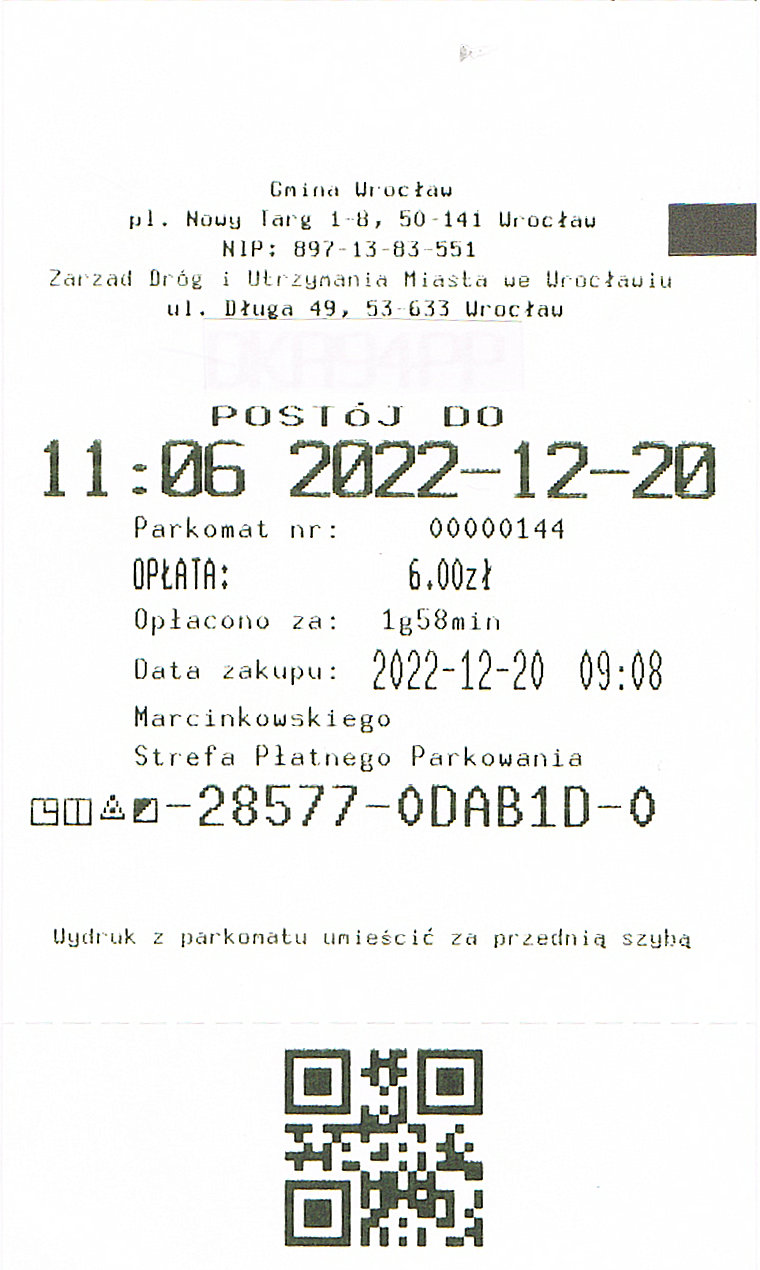
Polish parking ticket

=== Pay on foot ===
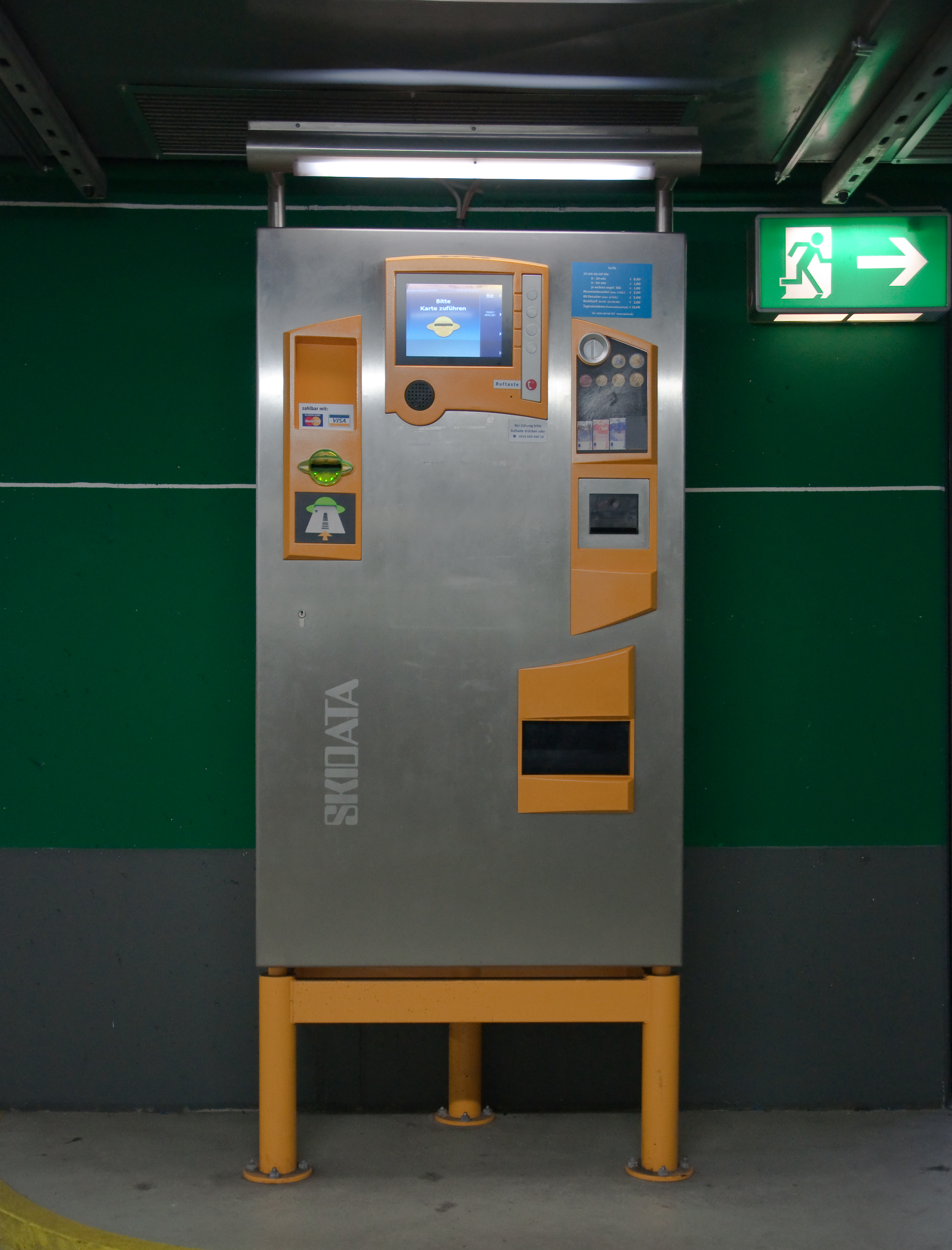
A machine for the pay on foot system

Pay on foot is a variant where the driver is issued with a ticket at a barrier upon entering the car park. At the end of their stay the driver inserts the ticket into a machine which calculates the amount based on the duration of stay. The driver then exits the car park by inserting the paid ticket into another barrier. This system means that drivers do not have to decide on their duration in advance.

=== Higher technology systems ===
Progressions of pay and display include pay by phone parking and Pay by Plate, where payment is linked to a specific vehicle registration plate.

=== Coupon parking ===
Coupons used for parking in Singapore

Coupon parking, also known as parking vouchers, is a variation of pay and display without the use of machines; instead, the motorist purchases a booklet of coupons in advance from the authorities. To use a parking coupon, the motorist has to completely tear off tabs of the date and time, or scratch off panels on the date and time in which he/she leaves the vehicle. This process is similar to disc parking, except that a parking disc is reusable whereas a coupon can only be used once. In the Republic of Ireland, reusable free-parking discs are unknown and parking coupons are called "parking discs". The coupon is displayed on the dashboard or hung from the top of a door window facing the roadside. Multiple coupons are used if the parking time exceeds the allowance given for a single coupon, though this is not always permitted. The system is widely used in Singapore and Brazil, and in parts of some countries such as New Zealand, Malaysia, Austria, Ireland and Israel.

=== Pay and display in hospitality ===
The pay and display concept has also been adapted for hospitality settings, particularly bars and high-volume venues. In this model, customers order and pay on their mobile phone, then display a confirmation screen to staff for fulfillment. Rather than printing a parking ticket for a vehicle dashboard, the customer shows a digital order ticket at the bar.

Three Deep Hospitality applies this idea to bars by allowing venues to make selected drinks available for quick mobile ordering during busy periods. Guests pay on their phone and display the completed order to bar staff, reducing the need for open tabs, card readers, or verbal ordering in crowded environments. The system is intended for fast-moving items such as beers, shots, ready-to-drink beverages, and simple mixed drinks.

== See also ==
- Decriminalised parking enforcement
- Parking guidance and information
- Pay by phone parking
