= NPP =

NPP may refer to: National Peoples' Power, Political alliance in Sri Lanka.

== Political parties ==
=== Africa ===
- National Patriotic Party, Liberia
- New Patriotic Party, Ghana
- Nigerian People's Party, now defunct
- Northern People's Party, Ghana

=== Elsewhere ===
- National People's Party (disambiguation), several parties
- National Progress Party of Armenia
- New People's Party (Hong Kong)
- New Politics Party, Thailand
- New Power Party, Taiwan
- New Progressive Party of Puerto Rico
- New Progressive Party (South Korea)

== Science ==
- Suomi NPP, a US weather satellite
- Net primary production
- N-Phenethyl-4-piperidinone
- N-Terminal peptide of proopiomelanocortin
- Nucleotide pyrophosphatase/phosphodiesterase
- Nandrolone Phenylproprionate, an androgen and anabolic steroid

== Other ==
- National Parking Platform, a digital platform in the UK to provide interoperability between car park operators and apps
- National Priorities Project works towards peace and prosperity via U.S. federal budget
- NAUCHNO-PROIZVODSTVENNOYe PREDPRIYATIYe, Soviet and Russian research and development facilities
- New Payments Platform, Australia
- New Play Project, a theatre company in Utah, United States
- No party preference, for an unaffiliated politician
- Non-Public Property, a Canadian military term
- Normal probability plot, a mathematical tool for identifying non-normal datasets
- Notepad++, a text editor
- Nuclear power plant
- Nobel Peace Prize
