= National Parking Platform =

Open platform for parking payments in the UK

- Original author: Department for Transport
- Developer: British Parking Association
- Available in: English
- Website: npp.org.uk

The National Parking Platform is a digital platform in the United Kingdom providing interoperability between car park operators, parking apps, and other service providers. It enables all parking apps that support the system: RingGo, JustPark, PayByPhone, Apcoa Connect, AppyParking, and Caura to work at all participating car parks. It has been rolled out in 21 local authorities so far. It was first developed by the Department for Transport starting in 2019, and since May 2025 is controlled by the British Parking Association on a not-for-profit basis.

== Participating local authorities ==
- Buckinghamshire
- Cheshire West and Chester
- Coventry City
- East Hertfordshire
- East Suffolk
- Lincolnshire
- Liverpool City
- Manchester City
- Oxfordshire County
- Peterborough City
- Stevenage
- Sutton
- Walsall
- Welwyn Hatfield
