= ParkMobile =

Parking payment mobile application

- Company type: Private
- Industry: Parking
- Founded: 2008; 18 years ago
- Founder: Albert Bogaard
- Headquarters: Atlanta, GA, United States
- Area served: North America
- Services: Parking payments and reservations
- Owner: Arrive
- Website: parkmobile.io

ParkMobile is a mobile and web app providing parking payments in North America. Headquartered in Atlanta, Georgia, users can pay for on-street and off-street parking via app on their smartphone, web browser, or through calling a phone number. ParkMobile also offers parking reservations at stadiums or venues for concerts and sporting events, and in metro area garages.

== History ==
ParkMobile was founded in the United States in 2008 by Albert Bogaard after originally starting in the Netherlands. The initial product served only zone (on-demand) parkers and payment for the parking spot was made via a phone call through an IVR system.

In 2009, the ParkMobile app was released and the product launched in its first city, Grand Rapids, Michigan. Parking payments have since been accepted through a user's account by connecting a credit card. ParkMobile deployed in Washington, D.C., in 2011. As of 2023, ParkMobile now has over 50 million users.

Parking reservations were introduced in 2017, allowing users to reserve parking in advance. In 2018, the company recapitalized with BMW as the shareholder. ParkMobile was then acquired by a joint venture with BMW and Daimler. Under this joint venture, ParkMobile parking payment functionality was available and integrated with BMW's navigation system in many of its 2018 models. EasyPark Group, the Swedish-based parking solutions company, acquired ParkMobile in 2021 and is the current owner rebranded as Arrive.

In 2022, ParkMobile launched in the City of Boston with a city-wide parking app, ParkBoston, powered by ParkMobile.

== Operations ==
=== Products ===
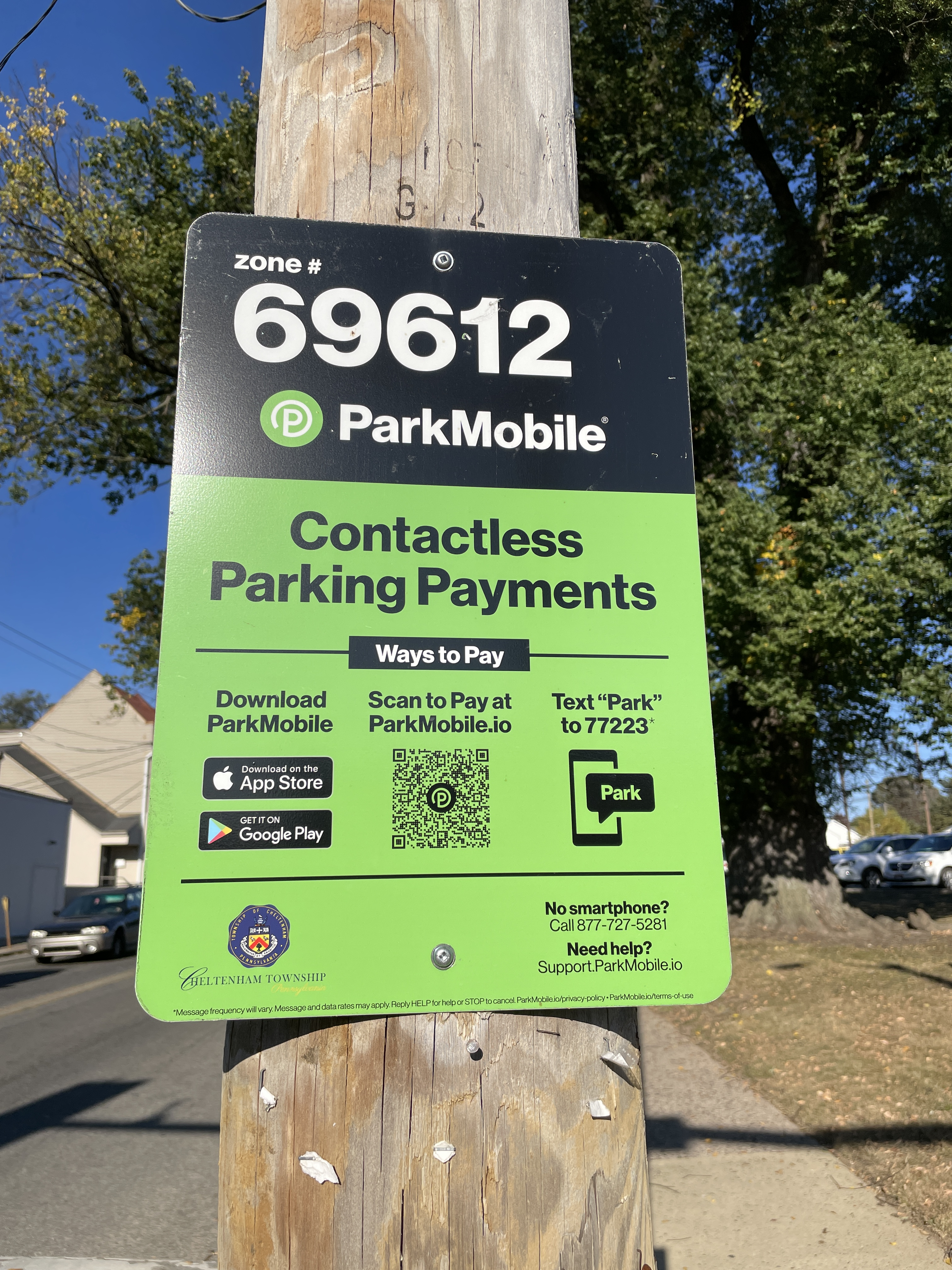
Sign for ParkMobile in Cheltenham Township, Pennsylvania

ParkMobile's product offerings include zone (on-demand) parking payments, parking reservations, and a self-service reporting engine. Zone parking is the company's most widely used service. Users can use the app on their smartphone to pay parking fees. In 2017, ParkMobile began offering parking reservations. The service is provided in addition to on-demand parking options at stadiums and venues, as well as metro area parking garages. After launching the reservations feature, ParkMobile became the first mobile parking app provider in North America to have a consolidated app with both on-demand and reservations parking in one.

ParkMobile 360, the company's self-service management and reporting platform for operators, launched in 2018. It is a web-based application for parking operators to manage parking inventory, adjust rates, create special parking events, and track analytics.

In 2020, ParkMobile began offering an option to pay for parking with Google through integrating the ParkMobile experience with Google Maps In 2021, ParkMobile launched its web application, allowing users to complete their parking transactions directly from the mobile website without having to download the app or have an account. ParkMobile integrates with parking gate equipment so customers can use their app to pay for parking and scan to enter and exit the garage.

=== Locations ===
ParkMobile has over 50 million users across the United States, Canada, and Puerto Rico. The app is available in over 550 cities in the U.S. and over 150 colleges and universities.

== Controversies ==
=== Predatory towing and excessive ticketing ===
Since all paid parking sessions from a single supplier are able to be viewed together, the ease of viewing and enforcing parking violations has caused controversy. Parking Enforcement Services in Birmingham, Alabama, has been the subject complaints by users of the ParkMobile app who had paid for a parking session and still had their vehicle towed. Customers often use old or expired license plates and forget to update to the correct number, or mistype when entering their information into the ParkMobile app. The complaints are that the towing companies offer no lenience for these mistakes. They return to their car as the session expires, and find their car has been towed.

Additionally, other municipality across the country have received complaints about excessive parking ticket issuing when inputting their information incorrectly in the ParkMobile app. In Stone Harbor, New Jersey, parking ticket violations increased by over 1,600% from the previous year since launching with the ParkMobile app. Police officers refute complaints of being "too strict" on writing tickets by admitting the ParkMobile system allows officers to "more seamlessly enforce" the city's parking laws.

=== Data security breach ===
In March 2021, ParkMobile suffered a cybersecurity incident "linked to a vulnerability in a third-party software," potentially exposing users' email addresses, phone numbers, and license plate numbers. ParkMobile responded by launching an investigation and notifying law enforcement authorities and affected municipalities. The investigation concluded "no sensitive data or Payment Card Information was affected" but ParkMobile confirmed that basic account information, such as license plate numbers and possibly email addresses or phone numbers, was accessed.
