= Parking meter =

Device for collecting money to use a given parking space

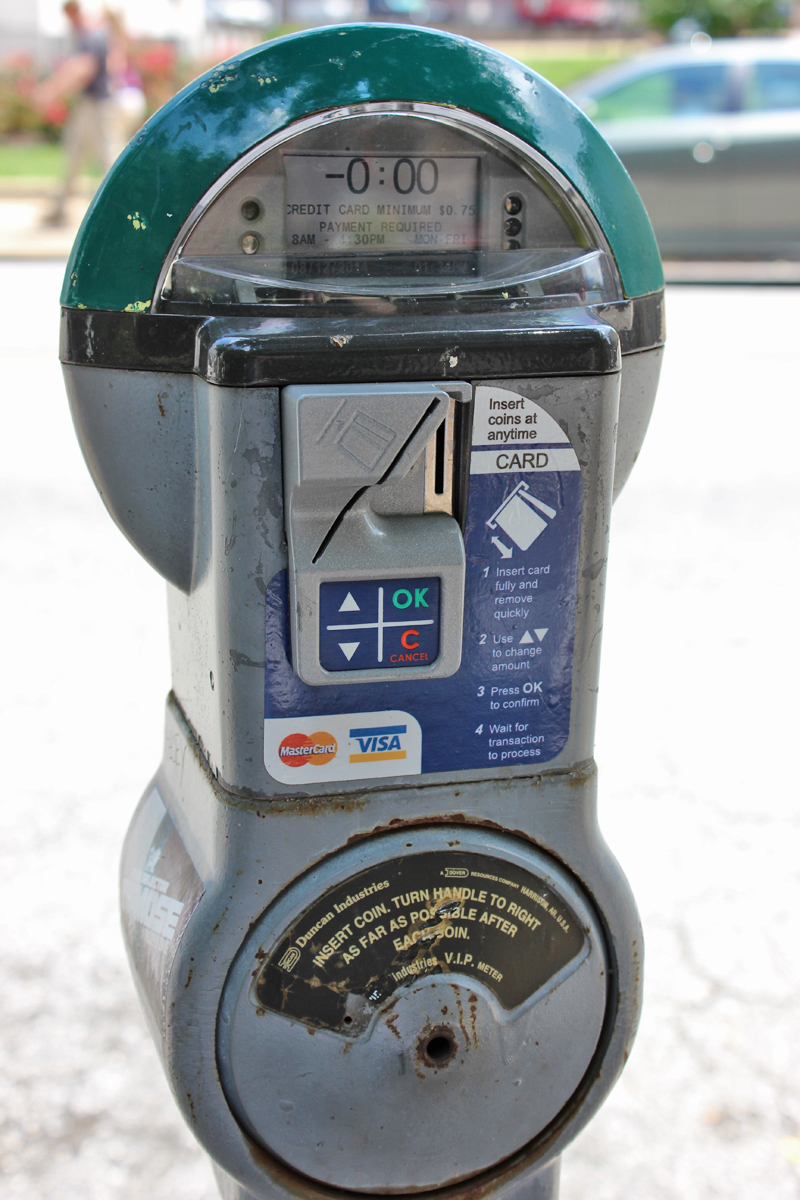
A digital CivicSmart brand parking meter which accepts coins or credit cards

A parking meter is a device used to collect money in exchange for the right to park a vehicle in a particular place for a limited amount of time. Parking meters can be used by municipalities as a tool for enforcing their integrated on-street parking policy, usually related to their traffic and mobility management policies, but are also used for revenue.

== History ==
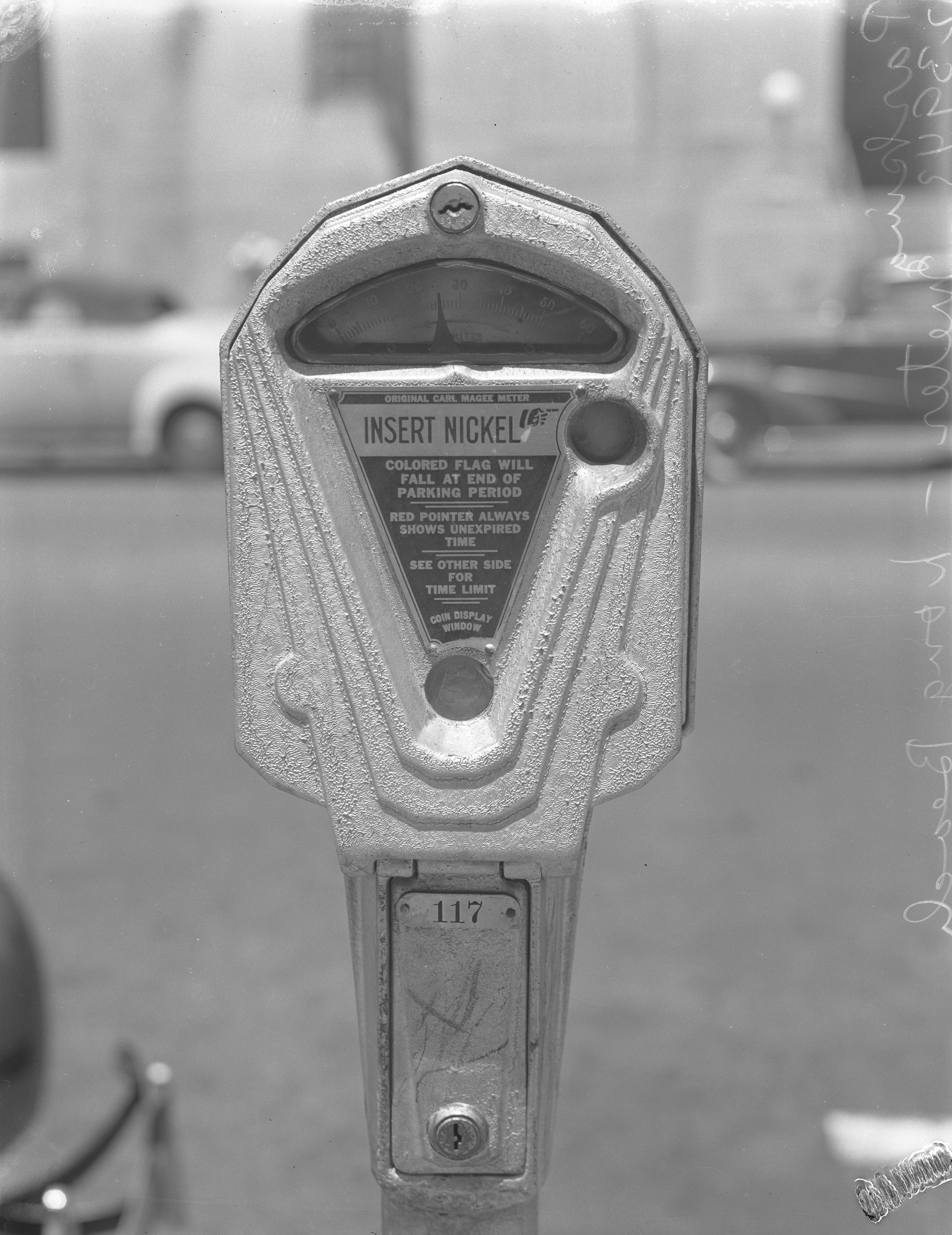
Parking meter c. 1940

An early patent for a parking meter, U.S. patent, was filed by Roger W. Babson, on August 30, 1928. The meter was intended to operate on power from the battery of the parking vehicle and required a connection from the car to the meter.

Holger George Thuesen and Gerald A. Hale designed the first working parking meter, the Black Maria, in 1935. The History Channel's... History's Lost and Found documents their success in developing the first working parking meter. Thuesen and Hale were engineering professors at Oklahoma State University. They began working on the parking meter in 1933 at the request of Oklahoma City, Oklahoma lawyer and newspaper publisher Carl C. Magee. The world's first installed parking meter was in Oklahoma City on July 16, 1935. Magee received a patent for the apparatus on 24 May 1938.

Industrial production started in 1936 and expanded until the mid-1980s. The first models were based on a coin acceptor, a dial to engage the mechanism, and a visible pointer and flag to indicate the expiration of the paid period. This configuration lasted more than 40 years, with only a few changes in the exterior design, such as a double-headed design (to cover two adjacent parking spaces) and the incorporation of new materials and production techniques.

M.H. Rhodes Inc. of Hartford, Connecticut started making meters for Mark-Time Parking Meter Company of Miami, where the first Rhodes meters were installed in 1936. These were different from the Magee design because only the driver's action of turning a handle was necessary to keep the spring wound. At the same time, Magee's meters needed a service worker to wind the spring occasionally.

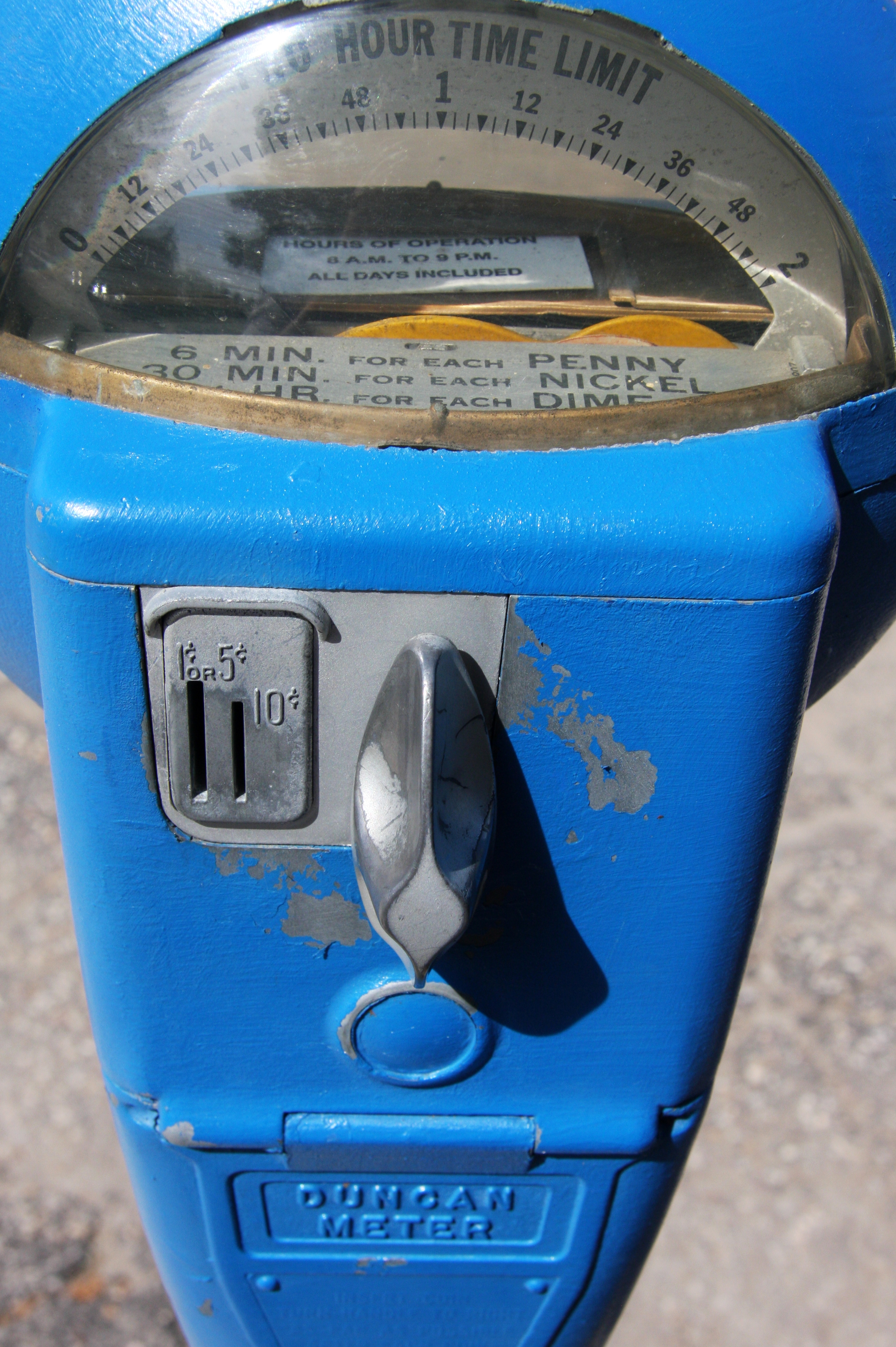
A fully mechanical Duncan brand parking meter which accepts U.S. pennies, nickels, and dimes

Upon insertion of coins into a currency detector slot or swiping a credit card or smartcard into a slot, and turning a handle (or pressing a key), a timer is initiated within the meter. Some locations now allow payment by mobile phone (to remotely record payments for subsequent checking and enforcement). A dial or display on the meter indicates the time remaining. In many cities, all parking meters are designed to use only one type of coin. Use of other coins will fail to register, and the meter may cease to function altogether. For example, in Hackensack, New Jersey, all parking meters are designed for quarters only.

In 1960, New York City hired its first crew of "meter maids"; all were women. It was not until 1967 that the first man was hired.

In the mid-1980s, a digital version was introduced, replacing the mechanical parts with electronic components: boards, keyboards, and displays. This allowed the meter more flexibility, as an EEPROM chip can be reconfigured more easily than corresponding mechanical components.

By the beginning of the 1990s, millions of parking meter units had been sold worldwide. Still, the market was already looking into new solutions, like the collective pay and display machines and new forms of payment that appeared along with electronic money and communication technologies.

=== Fully electrical ===
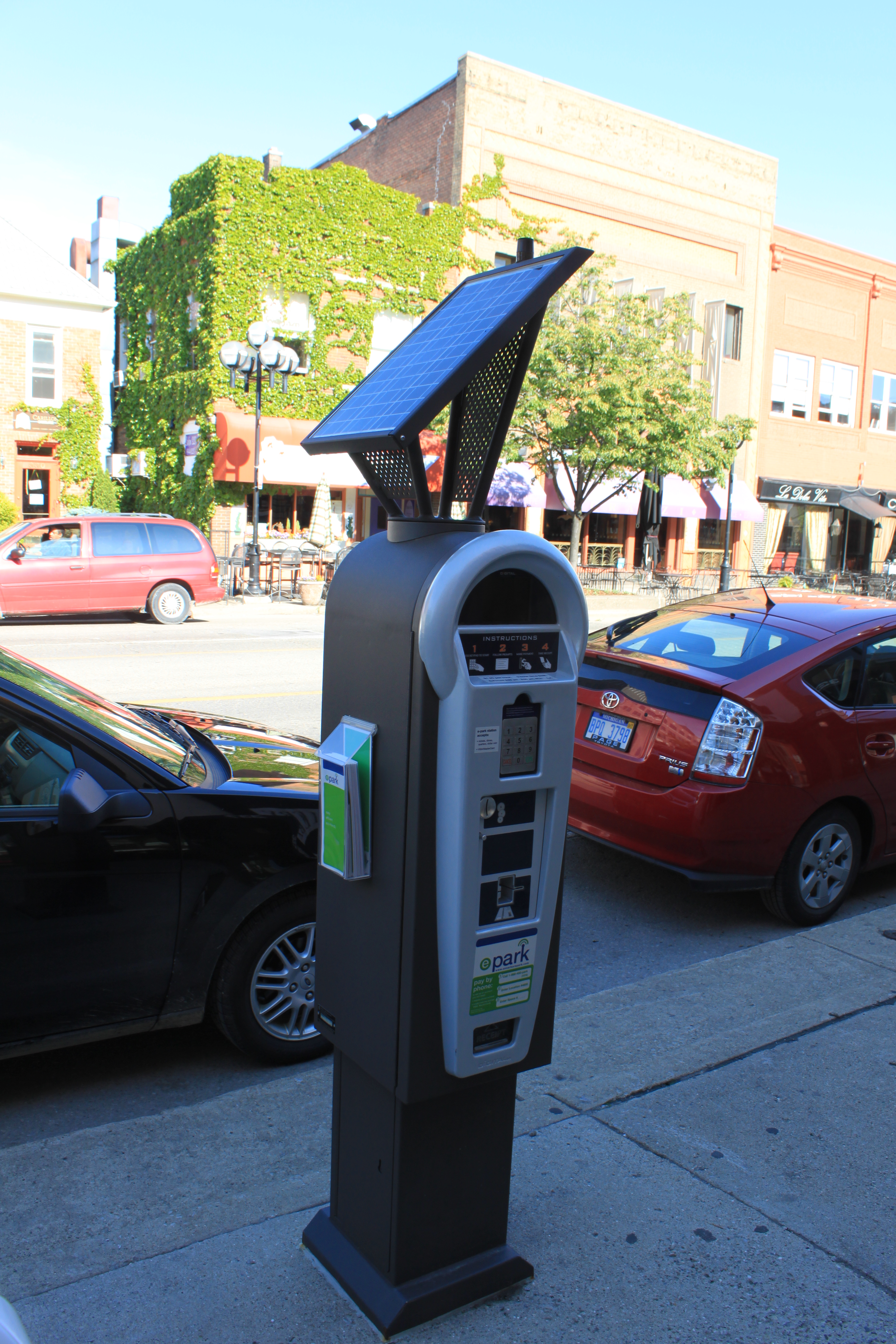
A solar-powered multi-space meter in Ann Arbor, Michigan. Similar meters are also used in White Rock, British Columbia, and Houston, Texas. Solar is optional.

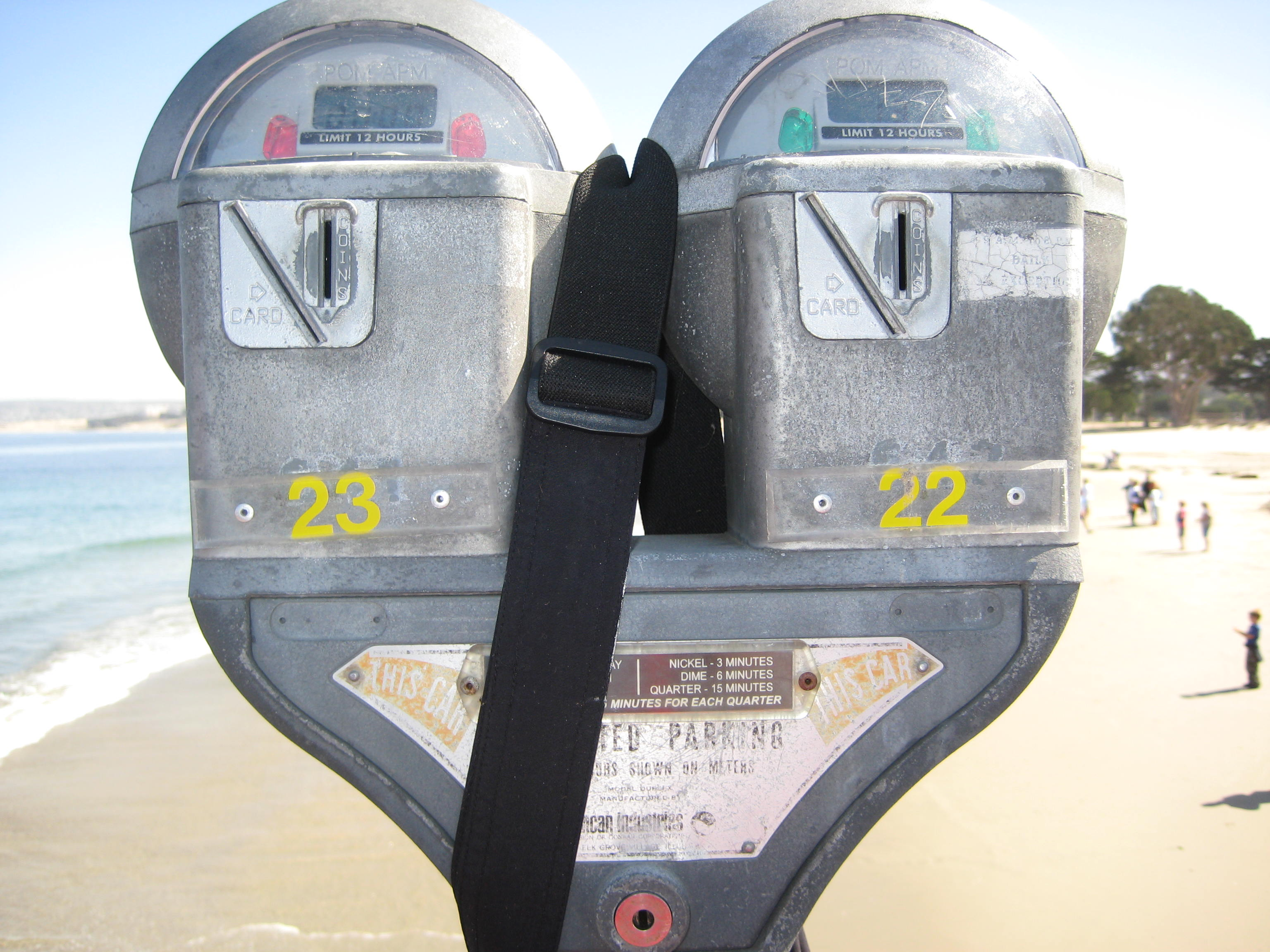
Parking meter with a digital display

More modern parking meters are generically called multi-space meters (as opposed to single-space meters) and control multiple spaces per block (typically 8-12) or lots (unlimited). While with these meters, the parker may have to walk several car lengths to the meter, there are significant customer service, performance, and efficiency benefits. Multispace meters incorporate more customer-friendly features such as on-screen instructions and acceptance of credit cards for payment—no longer do drivers have to have pockets full of coins. While they may still be prone to coin jams and other types of vandalism, most of these meters are wireless and can report problems immediately to maintenance staff, who can then fix the meters so they are not out of service for very long.

With pay-by-space meters, the driver parks in a space, goes to the meter, enters the space number, and makes payment. The meter memorizes the time remaining, and enforcement personnel press the bay buttons to check for violations.

Other advances in parking meters include vehicle detection technology, which allows the pay-by-space meters to know when a car is parked in a space. This opens the door for benefits for parking managers, including providing way-finding (directing drivers to unoccupied spaces via the web or street signs), enabling remote violation detection, and gathering vital statistics about parking supply and demand. Some meters allow payment for additional time by phone and notify drivers when they are about to expire. Parking meters in Santa Monica use vehicle detectors to prevent drivers from "feeding the meter" indefinitely, and to delete remaining time when a car departs so the next car cannot take any time without paying. Meters in Madrid give discounted and free parking to drivers of hybrid and electric vehicles, respectively. Drivers can reserve meters spots in Los Angeles by cellphone.

Another advancement with parking meters is the new solar-powered meters that accept credit cards and still coins. Credit card enabled solar powered "smart" single-space meters were installed in Los Angeles in 2010, and Mayor Antonio Villaraigosa stated "the city's Department of Transportation had projected the 10,000 Coin & Card parking meters installed over the last six months would generate 1-1.5 million in revenue each year". These parking meters replace the top of the meter, but use the existing pole, and use solar power, which can help with sending technicians a wireless signal when in need for repair. DDOT (the District of Columbia Department of Transportation) states that this new parking meter will provide: "better return on tax payer's investment, a variety of options, reduced maintenance, a variety of easy payment options, and increased reliability".

New digital meters now account for all of New York City's 62,000 single-space parking meters, which are more accurate and difficult to break into. New York City retired its last spring-loaded, single-space, mechanical parking meter at West 10th Street and Surf Avenue in Coney Island on December 20, 2006. "The world changes. Just as the [subway] token went, now the manual meter has gone", said Iris Weinshall, the city's transportation commissioner, at a small ceremony marking the occasion, The New York Times reported.

=== Security issues ===
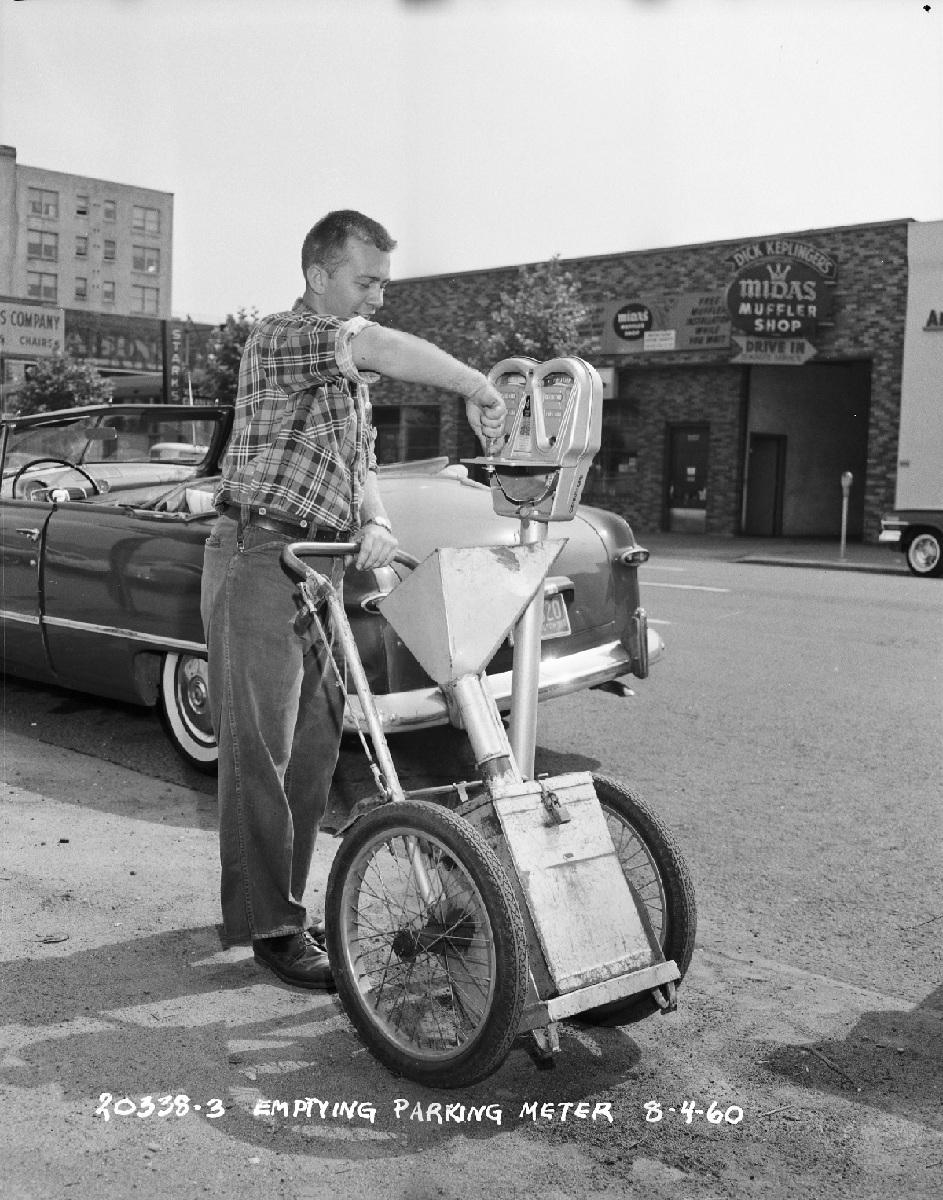
A worker emptying cash from a parking meter in 1960

Parking meters are exposed to the elements and vandals, so protection of the device and its cash contents is a priority. The meters are frequently targeted in areas where parking regulations and enforcement are widely perceived to be unfair and predatory.

Some cities have learned the hard way that these machines must be upgraded regularly, essentially playing an arms race with vandals. In Berkeley, California, the cut-off remains of meter poles were a common sight during the late 1990s, and parking was essentially free throughout the city until the city government installed digital parking meters with heavier poles in 2000 (which were eventually vandalized as well).

=== Legality in the United States ===
In a 1937 case in Oklahoma, H.E. Duncan contended that the ordinances impose a fee for the free use of the streets, which is a right of all citizens of the state granted by state law. The Courts ruled that free use of the streets is not an absolute right. Still, they agreed with an unpublished 1936 Florida court decision that said, "If it had been shown that the streets on which parking meters have been installed under this ordinance are not streets where the traffic is sufficiently heavy to require any parking regulations of this sort, or that the city was making inordinate and unjustified profits using the parking meters, and was resorting to their use not for regulatory purposes but for revenue only, there might have been a different judgment."

One of the first parking meter tickets resulted in the first court challenge to metered parking enforcement. Rev. C.H. North of Oklahoma City's Third Pentecostal Holiness Church had his citation dismissed when he claimed he had gone to a grocery store to get change for the meter.

The North Carolina Supreme Court judged that a city could not pledge on-street parking meter fee proceeds as security for bonds issued to build off-street parking decks. The court said, "Streets of a municipality are provided for public use. A city board has no valid authority to rent, lease, or let a parking space on the streets be rented by an individual motorist 'for a fee' or to charge a rate or toll. Much less may it lease or let the whole system of on-street parking meters for operation by a private corporation or individual."

A 2009 lawsuit filed by the Independent Voters of Illinois-Independent Precinct Organization claimed the City of Chicago's 2008 concession agreement for the operation of its parking meters to a private company violated state law. In November 2010, portions of the suit were thrown out by the Cook County Circuit Court, including the claim that the city was using public funds unlawfully to enforce parking regulations after the presiding judge decided that the city retained its ability to write tickets and enforce parking laws. However, the judge allowed other parts of the suit to stand, including an accusation that the city unlawfully conceded some of its policing power and its ability to set parking and traffic policy to the private company in the concession agreement. As of January 2011, the suit remained active, with the City of Chicago maintaining that the city retains all policing power, maintains responsibility for traffic management, and, through the concession agreement, retains control over rates.

=== Use in the United Kingdom ===
Parking meters were first used in Britain in 1958. They were used in most towns and cities although from c. 1980s they have mostly been replaced by Pay and display, pay on foot and Pay-by-phone parking.

== Alternatives ==
An example of an in-vehicle parking meter, the EasyPark device by Parx

In the US states of Texas, Maryland, California, Massachusetts, Utah, Virginia, and the whole of the European Union, holders of a disabled parking permit are exempt from parking meter fees on public streets. In some states, handicapped parking meters exist, which must be paid at the same rate as regular meters. However, one will also receive a violation ticket if a valid handicapped license plate or placard is not displayed on the vehicle.

Some cities have gone to a device called a Parkulator, where the users purchase a display device, usually for $5 or $10, then load it with as much time as they care to buy. They then activate the device when they park at a location, and place the display device on their dashboard so it is visible from the front windshield. The device counts down the time remaining on the device while it remains activated. When they return, the clock stops running, and the person does not overpay for unused time. In the UK, parking and paying with a credit or debit card through a dedicated telephone service is now possible. Civil Enforcement Officers that patrol the parking area are automatically informed through their handheld devices.

An in-vehicle parking meter is a handheld electronic device, the size of a pocket calculator, that drivers display in their car windows as a parking permit or as proof of parking payment. Implementation of IVPM began in the late 1980s in Arlington, VA, and is spreading to campuses and municipalities worldwide as a centralized method of parking management, revenue collection, and compliance enforcement. Another technology offers the possibility of reloading money (parking time) to the device via a secure Internet site.

== See also ==
- Coupon parking
- Ticket machine
- Decriminalised parking enforcement
- Disc parking
- Parking attendant
- Parking guidance and information
- Parking violation
- Parking Wars
- Pay and display
- Pay by phone parking
- Valet parking
- Automobile costs
- Coin parking

People

- Meade McClanahan, sued the city of Los Angeles to block the installation of parking meters

== Sources ==
- Oklahoma City site of first parking meter. (Historic film)
- "Parking Meters Yield $50,000 A Year" 1951 article with excellent illustration of coin-operated meters
- Articles from the Wausau Daily Herald
- Metergate from the SF Times (archived)
- Brink's 1978 parking meter theft
- Saskatoon, SK - the first Canadian City to offer cell phone parking payment option for its parking meters October 21, 2005
- Parking meter payment by cell phone from Slashdot, June 26, 2006
- Voice Of America Video
- New Parking Meter, calls you when time is up - with Pictures
- Sensor-based parking meter with push enforcement, bike share, wayfinding, and validation
- Secure Storage Technologies Smart Parking Meter
- The Case of the Parking Meter Thief, FBI
