= Coin parking =

Pay parking lots in Japan

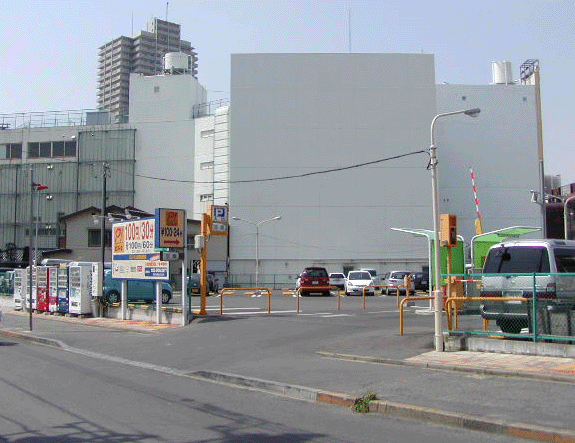
Gate style coin parking (outdoor)

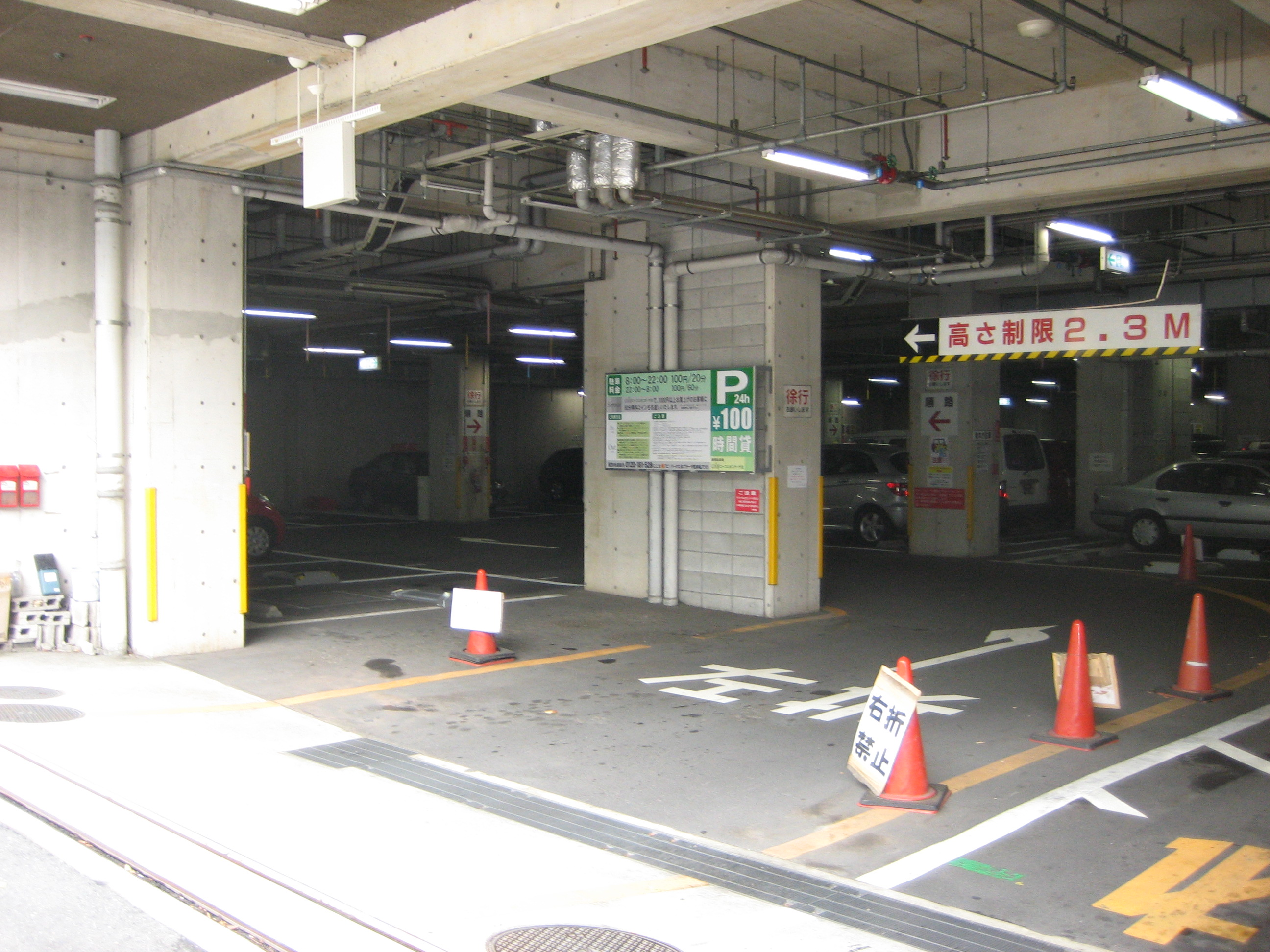
Locking device style coin parking (indoor)

Coin parking (コインパーキング, koin pākingu) is a type of parking facility where users can park their vehicles in available spaces and pay based on the time they use. It is also called an hourly parking lot. The term "coin parking" was created in Japan, corresponding to "pay parking lots" in English.

== Overview ==
They are often in operation 24 hours, unattended and rented by the hour. There are indoor and outdoor types, each utilizing a combination of locking devices, entrance gates, and payment machines to manage vehicles and fees.

In the locking device system, a car stopper will apply in the center or front of the car after the car is parked, locking the car to the lot, and preventing it from driving away.

When the user pays the parking fee at the payment machine, the obstruction is lowered, allowing the vehicle to exit. Although the parking lot is called “coin parking,” many operators nowadays accept credit cards and electronic currency as well as deferred payment for corporate clients.

Gate-system lots dispense at the entrance gate a ticket that is used to determine the parking duration and the fee collected at the exit gate. In recent years, some parking facilities have eliminated the need for a ticket by reading the user's license plate or linking a parking ticket to the license plate information and automatically opening and closing the gate at the exit when the fee is pre-paid.

Furthermore, there are other types that do not use locks or gates. These include the system where cameras installed in the parking lot read license plates to track parking duration (different from the gate system mentioned above), the system with parking ticket dispensers that print tickets that allow parking within the valid time, and the system with locked fee boxes where the fee and a slip of paper identifying the vehicle’s license number is inserted.

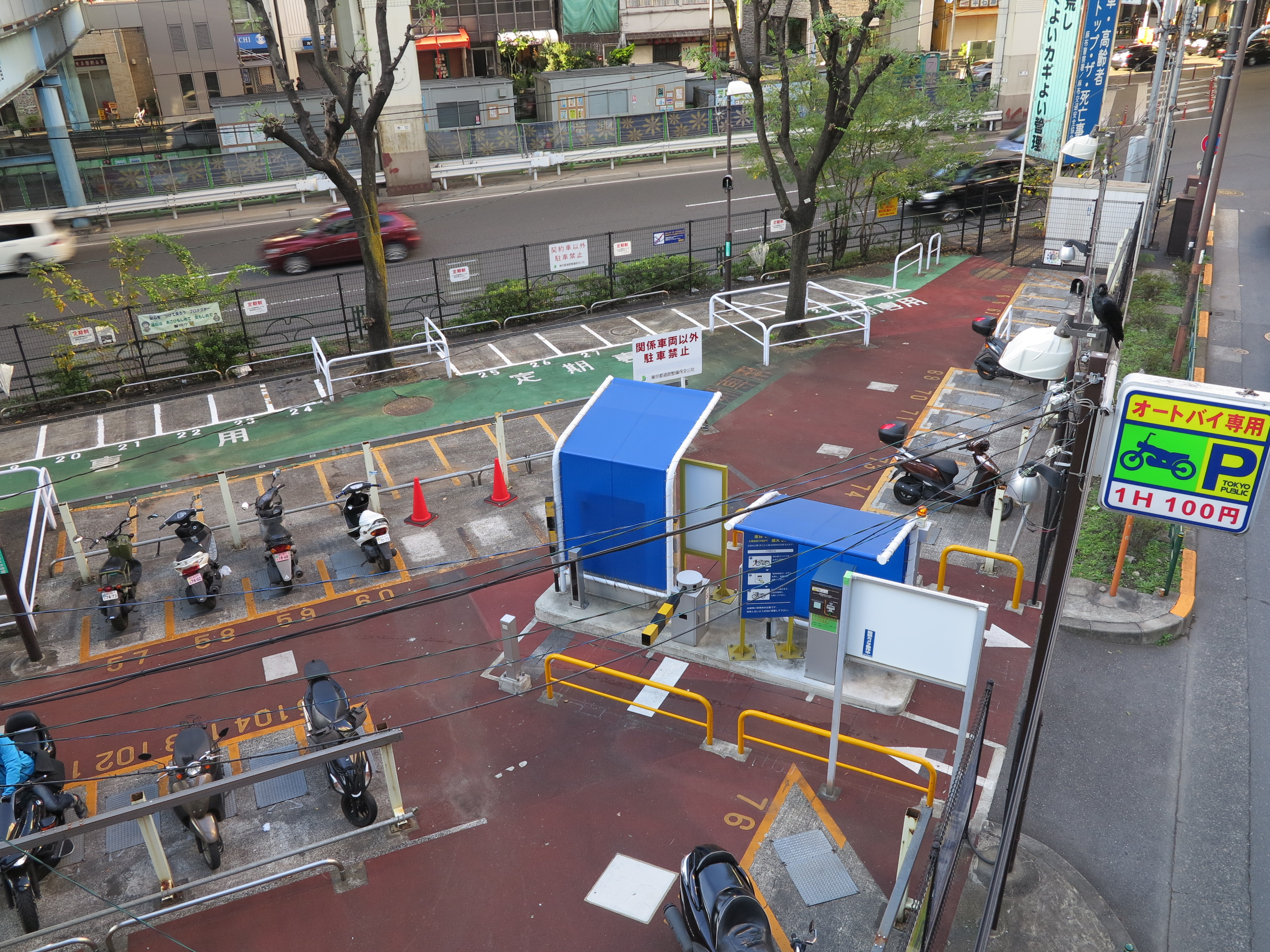
Bike-gate style coin parking

== Current status in Japan ==
While companies, organizations, and individuals have increasingly installed these facilities as a measure to make effective use of idle land, the number of those operating on sites leased by management companies and private operators is also increasing.

Charging expensive parking fees is becoming an issue with coin parking. For Instance, even though a sign might advertise “500 yen per day,” the fee could change the next day to 100 yen per hour, which is written in small font or on the back of the sign. This can be considered signboard fraud and has been increasing in recent years. The National Consumer Affairs Center of Japan also cautions that “ambiguous signage that is not easily understood at first glance is one of the contributing factors.”

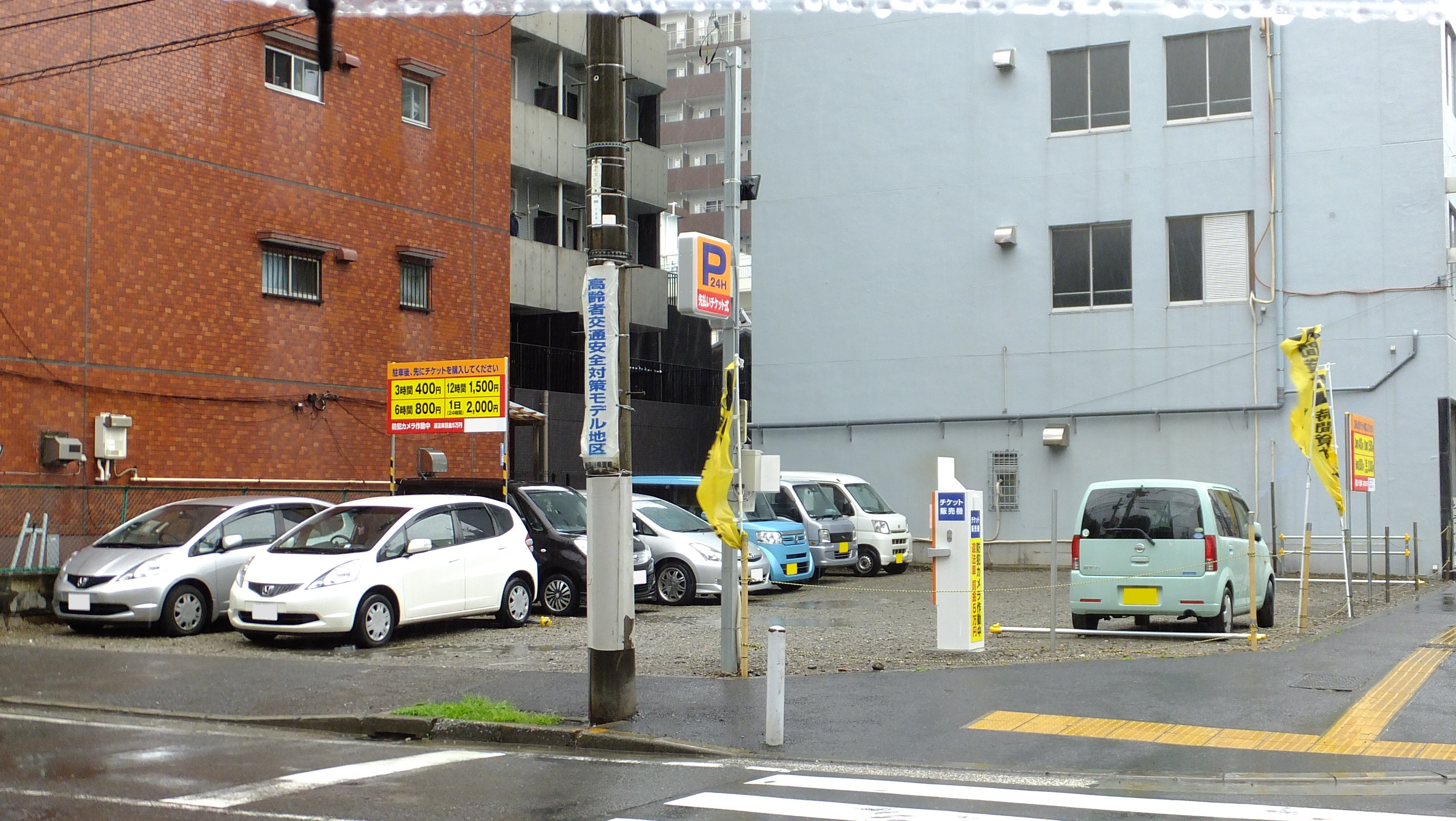
Simple installation style coin parking
