= Pay-by-phone parking =

Parking payment method

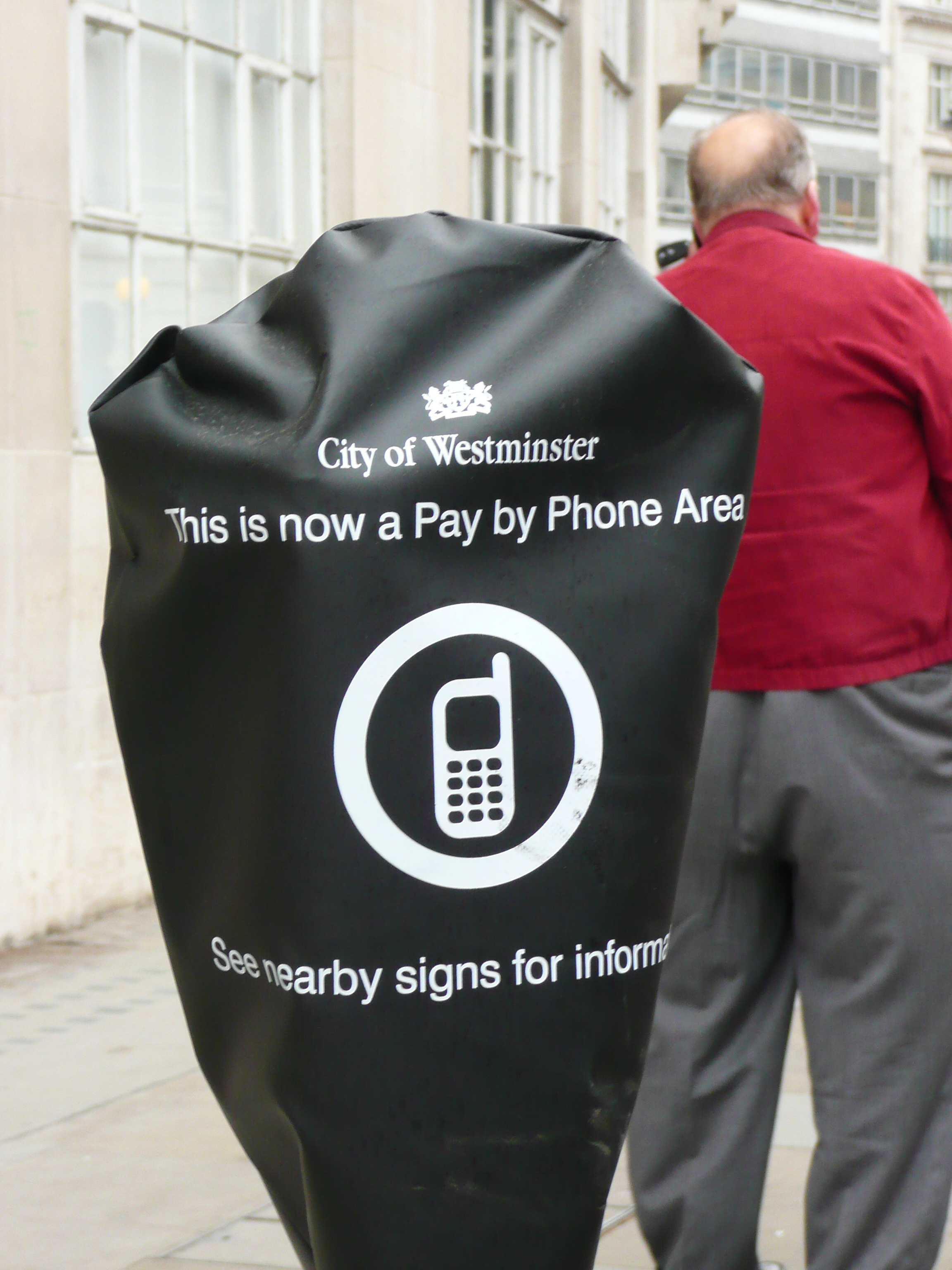
A closed (hooded / out of use) parking meter and a man paying for his parking by telephone. Seen in the Westminster area of London.

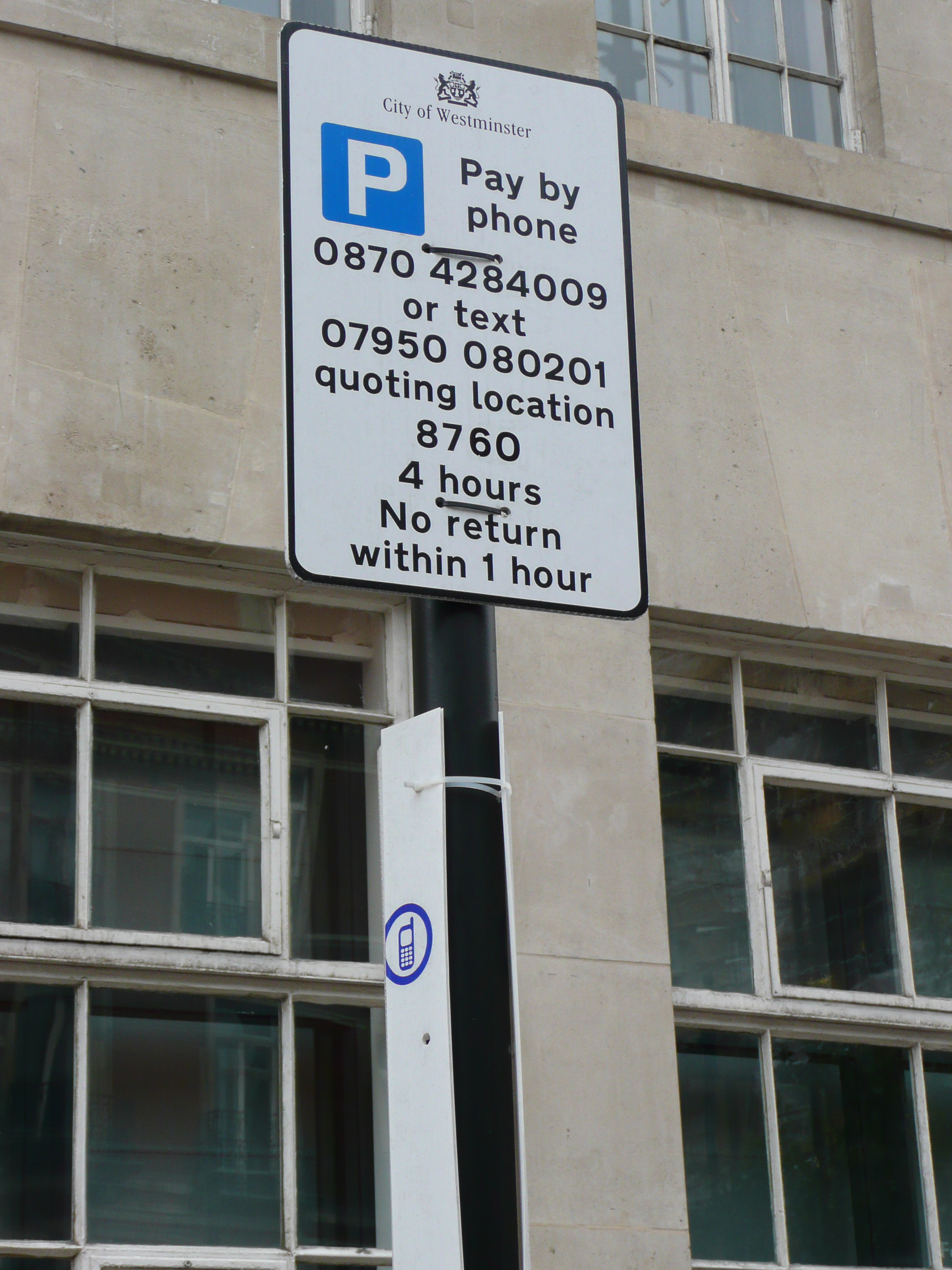
A sign telling people that they must pay for parking by telephone. Seen in the Westminster area of London.

Pay-by-phone parking is a system of paying for car parking via a mobile app or mobile network operator. It is an alternative to the traditional ways to pay for parking of parking meter or pay and display machines. SMS pay-by-phone parking was first introduced by Vipnet. Since its introduction in Croatian capital Zagreb in 2001 under the name M-parking, the number of registered users has steadily increased. By 2004, the Croatian M-parking scheme was the largest in Europe (with over 130,000 users). Today, pay-by-phone parking is used by millions of people all around the world.

== How it works ==
Pay-by-phone parking technology can be used in multiple ways: "start stop" and "start duration." "Start stop" parking requires the driver to contact the pay-by-phone provider first when the driver initiates the parking session and then again when the driver wishes to terminate the session. Alternatively, "start duration" requires the driver to only contact the pay-by-phone provider when the parking session is to be initiated, in which the driver dictates the amount of time the session will last. The driver can also add on additional time or extend the parking session if needed.

Most pay-by-phone solutions require pre-registration, including the need to provide either a credit card for parking charges or the use of a credit card to preload a prepaid account. There are some exceptions. For example, one provider allows new customers a one-time free parking opportunity without pre-registering, and then contacts the new customer by SMS (text) to invite him or her to register. The typical information required upon registration is data such as the mobile phone number(s) that the driver wishes to use to engage/disengage the parking session, license plate information of the vehicle(s) that the driver wishes to utilize and credit card information.

To activate a parking session, the driver must first arrive at a designated pay-by-phone parking area. In order for the service to be available, the operator of the parking space, whether a city or a private owner, must have contracted with the pay-by-phone service provider. But if the service is available it will be clearly marked on the street, meter, sign or space. Then the driver can either call the pay-by-phone service provider (via a toll free number) or use their mobile application.

For the "start stop" customer to complete a transaction, the driver must call the pay-by-phone service provider again or use their mobile application upon departure to stop their parking transaction. The provider should quickly recognize that the user has an active parking session and with the customer's discretion the session will be closed immediately.

== NFC technology development for pay-by-phone parking ==
It's anticipated that mobile carriers will be making it easier for drivers to use near-field communications (NFC) technology enabled mobile phones to pay for parking. Drivers use a downloaded app or call a toll-free number to start parking. Once this technology reaches critical mass among the phone carriers, there are a couple existing mobile payment providers that have mobile apps ready. Using a mobile phone to pay for parking will be as simple as tapping a NFC embedded logo.

== Advantages ==
For motorists pay-by-phone parking is more convenient and timely than standard methods of parking payment as cash is not required unlike a parking meter.

Data collection allows for customers to track their parking expenses and more easily allow the creation of receipts for expenses.

As 28-45% of congestion is due to drivers looking for places to park parking apps may decrease congestion as parking apps often include accurate data on where there are empty parking spaces.

Some mobile payment providers, and at the discretion of the parking operator (e.g., local council), drivers can opt to receive a text message several minutes before their expiry of their parking session, enabling them to extend the session without returning to their car. Most operators impose a maximum extension period.

For providers pay by phone parking is cheaper to run as the customer generally must pay a transaction fee to the pay-by-phone provider in addition to the standard parking rate instead of the provider paying for parking meter maintenance.

Accurate data management provides additional resources for the parking provider. Since transactions are submitted digitally, providers have access to information regarding each customer's parking sessions. With this data, legal challenges and complaints can be significantly reduced and enforcement can be handled more accurately and efficiently.

Parking apps do not need the same expensive maintenance as alternatives. As 3G networks are shut down, pay and display machines that rely on a 3G connection will need to be expensively upgraded or replaced.

== Disadvantages ==
The use of pay-by-phone parking has been criticised in the British media for isolating elderly and customers who are less likely to own a smartphone and are more likely to rely on cash if no alternatives are provided.

Pay-by-phone parking costs more for motorists as they have to pay a surcharge on top of the parking fee for the apps use.

Pay-by-phone parking requires a connection to either the internet or mobile signal and a lack of either can leave users liable to be fined for not paying for parking.

If the apps used for pay-by-phone parking are down it makes it impossible to pay for parking.

Cash cannot be used for pay-by-phone parking. Unlike parking meters that only accept cash pay and display machines commonly accept both card and cash.

Parking apps require much more personal information of the drivers using them than alternatives which makes them the target of hackers such as when EasyPark Group was hacked in December 2023 leaking customer's names, addresses, email addresses, phone numbers and partial payment information.

Parking apps are extremely unpopular with motorists. 70% of UK respondents in 2017 said that they would look for a car park elsewhere rather than use a parking app. Some places have seen dramatic decreases in traffic of up to 40% since changing to pay-by-phone systems.

Competing apps are not inter-operable and as such motorists would need many apps installed in order to use different car parks. In the UK there are 30 competing parking apps.

== Enforcement ==
Since pay-by-phone parking has been put into operation, several new ways of enforcing parking violations have been created:

- Use of a web browser
  The parking provider is given access to a web page which contains a list that includes all of the active parking sessions, each vehicle’s license plate information and the amount of time that each session has been active. There are options for a smartphone's web browser or software for the in-vehicle computers. Pro: simple setup, easy ramp-on. Con: complex operations, failure prone.
- Handheld computer
  These computers have the capability of scanning individual license plates in a similar fashion to which a barcode is read. Pro: convenient. Con: expensive.
- Drive-by scanners
  These scanners are mounted to an enforcement vehicle and use License Plate Recognition (LPR) technology which automatically scans each parked vehicle’s license plate and identifies the vehicles parking status. Pro: labor efficient. Con: expensive, unreliable.
- Automatic notification

== Providers ==
Major providers include Flowbird, RingGo, PayByPhone, ParkMobile, and SpotHero.

== See also ==
- Parking meter
- Pay and display
