= RingGo =

Pay-by-phone parking service

RingGo is a pay-by-phone parking service, based in the UK owned by Arrive, formerly EasyPark Group.

== Technology ==
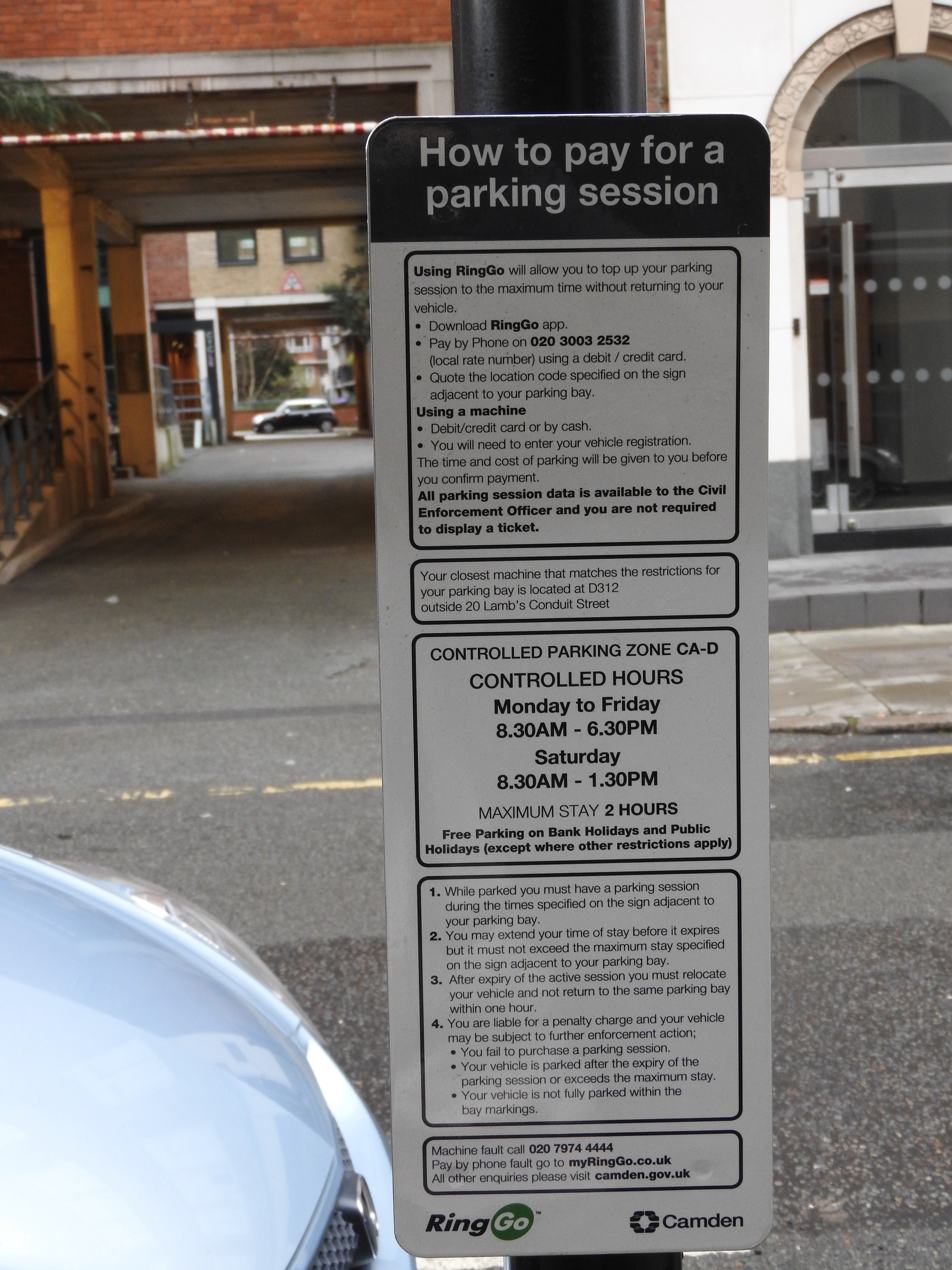
RingGo in use in the London Borough of Camden.

The system is used by local authorities for on-street parking and public car parks. In 2023 RingGo had 10 million yearly customers, revenue of £30m and operating profit of £6m.

== Criticisms ==
It has been suggested that councils that use RingGo are unfairly penalising users who find the technology difficult to use or do not own a smart phone. This has meant reduced customer numbers in some shopping centres that switched to smartphone-only parking.

Some car parks use the app's "Start-Stop" system that requires that users log both their arrival and departure time and failure to remember to sign out can lead to an overcharge. Not all car parks operate using this system.

== Incidents ==
On 10 December 2023 RingGo’s parent company, EasyPark Group, suffered a breach of customer names, addresses, email addresses, phone numbers and partial payment card information. Over two weeks later on 26 December EasyPark informed the UK's Information Commissioner's Office (ICO) and other data protection authorities.
