= Parking guidance and information =

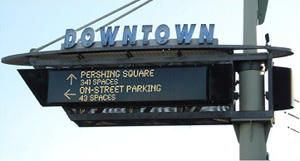
Variable message sign showing people driving where parking spaces are available.

Parking guidance and information (PGI) systems, or car park guidance systems, present drivers with dynamic information on parking within controlled areas. The systems combine traffic monitoring, communication, processing and variable message sign technologies to provide the service.

== Purpose and function ==
Modern parking lots utilize a variety of technologies to help motorists find unoccupied parking spaces, car location when returning to the vehicle and improve their experience. This includes adaptive lighting sensors, parking space indicators above every parking space (red for occupied, green for available, blue is reserved for disabled people), and indoor positioning systems (IPS).

PGI systems are part of the development of intelligent transportation systems in urban areas. PGI systems can assist in the development of safe, efficient and environmentally friendly transportation networks.

PGI systems are designed to aid in the search for vacant parking spaces by directing drivers to car parks where occupancy levels are low. The objective is to reduce search time, which in turn reduces congestion on the surrounding roads for other traffic with related benefits to air pollution with the ultimate aim of enhancement of the urban area.

Parking guidance systems have evolved a lot in recent times. Ultrasonic and laser technologies provide information on the availability of parking spaces throughout the parking facility. At the same time, new camera-based technologies now make it possible to read the license plate of the vehicle in each parking space. This is an added value since it allows the identification of a specific vehicle in a specific parking space and, in addition, sometimes records possible incidents occurring in that space. These new methods increase security and revenue for the parking owners.

== Components ==
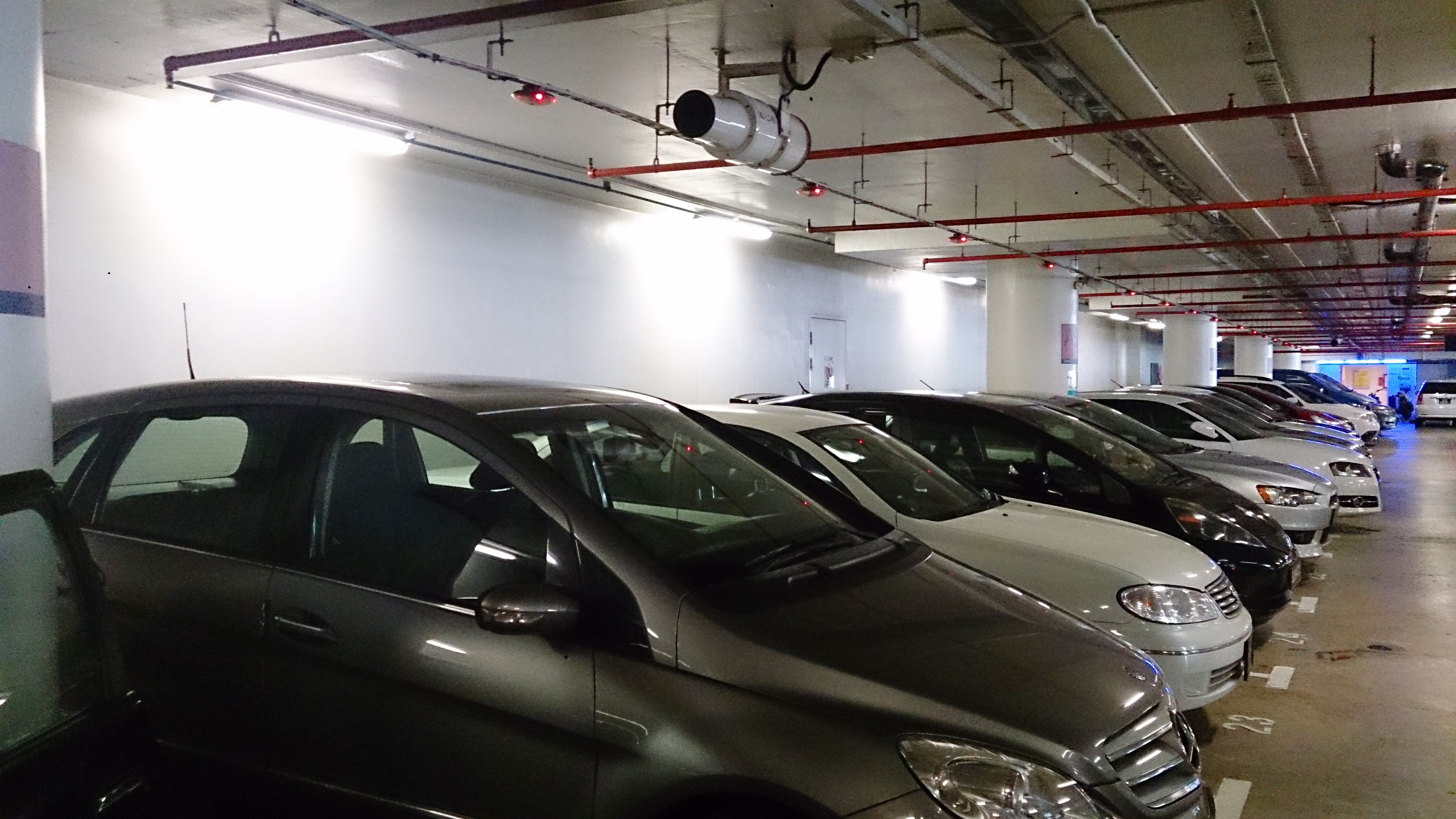
Ultrasonic sensors above each space in this indoor car park indicate if a car has already taken the space using LEDs.

Parking guidance systems (PGS) may use elements including:

- Ultrasound detectors
- Camera-based sensors and computer vision strategies
- Internet of things technologies
- Individual indicators
- Zone controllers
- Data / intermediate controllers
- Central control system
- Signs or displays
- Kiosks

== See also ==
- On-street parking sensing
