= Barnacle (disambiguation) =

A barnacle is a sessile marine animal.

Barnacle(s) may also refer to:

- Barnacle (surname)
- Barnacle (comics), a character from Marvel Comics
- Barnacle (parking), a device that prevents drivers from operating illegally parked vehicles
- Barnacle (slang), an electronic part manually installed onto a printed circuit board to correct a functional deficiency
- Barnacle, Warwickshire, a small hamlet in Warwickshire, England
- Seborrheic keratosis, a non-cancerous benign skin growth, known as the "barnacles of old age"
- "Barnacle", a 2021 song by Limp Bizkit from Still Sucks
- "Barnacles", a 2002 song by Ugly Casanova from Sharpen Your Teeth
- Captain Barnacles, a character from Octonauts

== See also ==
- The Barnacle Historic State Park, a Florida State Park
- Barnacle goose, a species of bird
- Barnacle Boy, a SpongeBob SquarePants character
