= CAG =

CAG or cag may refer to:

== Military ==
- CAG, the United States Navy's hull classification symbol for "cruiser, heavy, guided missile (retired)"
- Civil Affairs Group, the civil-military operations coordinators of the United States Marine Corps
- Commander Air Group, most senior officer of the embarked squadrons in a carrier air wing
- Delta Force (also Combat Applications Group), a special operations force of the United States Army

== Organizations ==
- Canadian Association of Geographers, an educational and scientific society in Canada
- Communication Arts Guild, an organisation dedicated to the Indian advertising industry
- Comptroller and Auditor General of India
- Conagra Brands (NYSE symbol: CAG), an American consumer packaged goods holding company
- Consumer Action Group, a UK forum which provides free help and support on all consumer issues

== Other ==
- CAG, a codon that encodes the α-amino acid glutamine
- CAG, ISO provincial code for the province of Cagayan, Philippines
- The Church of Almighty God
- Cagliari Elmas Airport (IATA code: CAG), an international airport in Elmas, Italy
- Carte archéologique de la Gaule, a series of books on French archaeology
- Chassis Air Guide, Intel's thermal system to PC chassis
- Cheap Ass Gamer, an online bulletin board system community which focuses on video game deals
- Commentaria in Aristotelem Graeca, the standard collection of extant ancient Greek commentaries on Aristotle
- Computer-assisted gaming, games which are at least partially computerized
- Craig–Moffat Airport (FAA LID: CAG), a public airport two miles southeast of Craig, Moffat County, Colorado
- Nivaclé language (ISO 639-3 code: cag), a Matacoan language spoken in Paraguay and in Argentina by the Nivaclé
