= ACS:Law =

British law firm

- Headquarters: London
- No. of offices: 1
- Major practice areas: Civil litigation, commercial litigation, debt and money advice, employment law, intellectual property law
- Date founded: unknown

ACS:Law was a United Kingdom law firm specialising in intellectual property law. Prior to 2009, its most notable case was the defence of a British national accused of public indecency in Dubai. The firm is best known for its actions against persons allegedly infringing copyright through peer-to-peer file sharing. The firm ceased pursuing file sharers in January 2011 and ceased trading on 3 February 2011.

== Firm ==
The main partner of the firm, and its only registered solicitor, was Andrew Jonathan Crossley. Crossley was found guilty of conduct unbefitting a solicitor by the Solicitors Regulation Authority in 2012. In 2012 he was suspended from practicing as a solicitor for two years. Crossley was declared bankrupt by the High Court in London on 20 May 2011. As of August 2023, Crossley is a consultant solicitor at Taylor Rose.

== Action against suspected copyright infringement ==
ACS:Law first started claims against suspected copyright infringement through peer-to-peer file sharing in May 2009. In November 2009, they announced plans to initiate claims against a further 25,000 individuals; a batch of 10,000 dunning letters were sent out in the first two weeks of January 2010.

ACS:Law say that "the majority" of people choose to settle outside of court rather than fight the claims, but others claim that only 15-40% of people threatened end up paying. According to Crossley, ACS:Law had recovered almost £1 million from suspected copyright infringers by April 2010. In the Patents County Court in January 2011, it was revealed that Crossley took 65% of the money recovered, with only 30% going to copyright holders. One of ACS:Law's clients was the now defunct Frankfurt based company DigiProtect, whose motto was "turn piracy into profit".

== Solicitors Regulation Authority investigation and tribunal ==
In September 2009, complaints made to the Solicitors Regulation Authority (SRA) about the conduct of ACS:Law constituted more than 16% of all complaints to the body for the whole month, and the SRA confirmed that the firm was under investigation. By July 2010, the SRA had received a record 418 official complaints from members of the public.

In August 2010, the SRA ruled that ACS:Law had "a case to answer" regarding its campaign against suspected copyright infringement, and would refer the case to the Solicitors Disciplinary Tribunal (SDT).

Crossley engaged the services of Andrew Hopper QC who, according to Crossley "literally wrote the SRA rules", to assist in his defence against the SRA/SDT. In a letter to the Law Society Gazette, Crossley complained about "the repeated attempts [of ACS:Law's critics] to whip up hysteria and public outcry" regarding ACS:Law's action. Crossley had been declared bankrupt and represented himself at subsequent hearings before the SDT.

On 16 January 2012, the SDT found Crossley guilty on seven charges, suspended him from practicing law for two years and ordered him to pay £76,326.55 in costs. A spokesman for the SRA commented "Some of those affected were vulnerable members of the public and this matter has caused them significant distress." Crossley was allowed to work as a solicitor again from 2013 subject to conditions including a ban from owning or running a law practice.

== Investigation by the Information Commissioner ==
On 21 September 2010, the website of ACS:Law was subjected to a DDoS attack suspected to be coordinated by online group Anonymous as part of Operation Payback. When asked about the attacks, Crossley said: "It was only down for a few hours. I have far more concern over the fact of my train turning up 10 minutes late or having to queue for a coffee than them wasting my time with this sort of rubbish."

When the site came back online, a 350MB file which was a backup of the site was visible to anyone for a short period of time. The backup, which included copies of emails sent by the firm, was downloaded and made available as a torrent. Some of the emails contained unencrypted Excel spreadsheets, listing the names and addresses of people that ACS:Law had accused of illegally sharing media. One contained over 5,300 Sky broadband customers whom they had accused of illegally sharing pornography, while another contained the details of 8,000 Sky customers and 400 Plusnet customers accused of infringing the copyright on music by sharing it on peer-to-peer networks. This alleged breach of the Data Protection Act became part of an investigation into ACS:Law by the Information Commissioner's Office.

In May 2011, ACS:Law was fined £1000 for the privacy breach, with the Information Commissioner Christopher Graham commenting: "Were it not for the fact that ACS:Law has ceased trading so that Mr Crossley now has limited means, a monetary penalty of £200,000 would have been imposed, given the severity of the breach." Graham criticised ACS:Law for having computer security measures that "were barely fit for purpose in a person's home environment, let alone a business handling such sensitive details." The consumer group Which? described the £1000 fine as "paltry".

== Court case and withdrawal from action against file sharers ==
In January 2011, ACS:Law, acting for its client MediaCAT, attempted to gain judgements against 26 suspected illegal file sharers. The case was heard in the Patents County Court in London by Judge Colin Birss. Shortly after proceedings started, ACS:Law attempted to drop the case. It was also reported that barristers for ACS:Law failed to provide vital documents due to them being "in storage". As the copyright holders were not present in court, Judge Birss was unable to end the case in a "simple" fashion. Judge Birss criticised ACS:Law, saying the case was "mind-boggling".

Through a statement read to court on 24 January 2011, Crossley announced that he was withdrawing from pursuing claims against alleged illegal file sharers, citing criminal attacks and bomb threats as reasons. In response, Judge Colin Birss said "I am not happy. I am getting the impression with every twist and turn since I started looking at these cases that there is a desire to avoid any judicial scrutiny". On 8 February 2011, Judge Birss told ACS:Law that the claims which had been brought to court could not be discontinued without the permission of the copyright holders, and a further hearing was set for 16 March. At this hearing the cases were officially closed. The judge deferred a decision on legal costs, saying: "If ever there was a case with conduct out of the norm it was this one".

== Successor firms ==
During the court case of January 2011, some of the 26 individuals who had had their cases dropped by ACS:Law then received a letter from GCB Ltd., a new law firm. In court, Judge Colin Birss questioned Andrew Crossley about his relationship to GCB Ltd. Crossley admitted that the founders of GCB Ltd. had previously been employed by him at ACS:Law. On 8 February 2011 judgment, Judge Birss commented that attempting to pursue claims through GCB whilst discontinuing the court claims was "an abuse of the court's process".

In July 2011, it was reported that some people in Greece had received emails purporting to come from ACS:Law, accusing them of file sharing and demanding payments of £1665. Andrew Crossley denied sending the emails and branded them a scam, saying that he would contact the police. The IP addresses listed in the emails were not from UK.

In 2016 The SRA removed the conditions on Crossley. He went on to work for Warren's Law and Advocacy, but is now practising again with his new company St Paul's Solicitors where he continues to deal with speculative invoicing cases along with data protection offences.

== Criticism and controversies ==
=== Investigations by regulatory authorities ===
As well as the investigation by the Solicitors Regulation Authority, complaints have also been received by The Law Society and the Consumer Action Group.

=== Quality of evidence against suspected copyright infringers ===
ACS:Law identify suspected copyright infringement through peer-to-peer file sharing by the IP address of the internet user's connection. However, ACS:Law's use of Logistep's technology has been the subject of an investigation by Which?, who said that "innocent people are being accused". Following the batch of 10,000 letters sent in January 2010, over 150 people contacted Which? saying that they had been falsely accused. In an interview with The Guardian, one person who had received letters from ACS:Law commented: "ACS:Law act as investigator, judge and jury without any regard for who their actions affect."

Researchers in Washington DC found that the technology often results in false positives. ACS:Law responded saying "we are happy that the information we get is completely accurate". A study by the ISP TalkTalk showed that unsecured Wi-Fi networks can easily be accessed without permission, leading to innocent users being accused of activity carried out by a third party. Andrew Heaney, spokesman for TalkTalk, explained "the lack of presumption of innocence and the absence of judicial process combined with the prevalence of wi-fi hacking will result in innocent people being [blamed]".

=== Lack of definitive court judgments ===
The only records of successful court cases which ACS:Law relied upon for its letter writing campaign in relation to copyright infringement through peer-to-peer file sharing were won by default when the defendants failed to appear. In 2009, the firm has admitted that they have yet to successfully prove a case in court. ACS:Law state that "it has been said that we have no intention of going to court but we have no fear of it".

=== Failure to gain default judgments ===
In December 2010, Judge Colin Birss QC rejected eight attempts by ACS:Law to seek default judgements in the Patents County Court. Citing issues including the failure to establish the age of the persons who might have downloaded the material, Birss stated: "In all these circumstances, a default judgment arrived at without notice by means of an essentially administrative procedure, even one restricted to a financial claim, seems to me to be capable of working real injustice."

=== Criticism from the music industry ===
ACS:Law has been criticised by representatives of the music industry. The British Phonographic Industry (BPI) said "our view is that legal action is best reserved for the most persistent or serious offenders - rather than widely used as a first response", adding that they would not be adopting the tactics of ACS:Law.

=== Criticism in the House of Lords ===
On 26 January 2010 Lord Lucas spoke out against the activities of law firms, including ACS:Law, calling it "blackmail" and explaining:

We must also do something about the quantum of damages that is being sought. In a civil procedure on a technical matter, it amounts to blackmail; the cost of defending one of these things is reckoned to be £10,000.

=== Attempts to silence Slyck.com ===
ACS:Law has also been accused of attempting to silence some of their critics. Three major discussion forums were started on Slyck.com in response to ACS:Law's action; many of the participants of these forums offer legal advice and actively organize against ACS:Law. ACS:Law sent Slyck.com a legal notice claiming defamation and threatening a lawsuit.

== See also ==
- Capitol v. Thomas
- Copyright law of the United Kingdom
- Digital Economy Act 2010
- MediaDefender
- Norwich Pharmacal order
- Prenda Law
