= British Parking Association =

Trade association in the UK

The British Parking Association
- Type: Trade association, Not-for-profit organisation
- Founded: 1968
- Headquarters: Chelsea House, 8-14 The Broadway, Haywards Heath West Sussex RH16 3AH
- Area served: United Kingdom
- Key people: Andrew Pester (Chief Executive); Steven Foster (President)
- Revenue: £4.18 million GBP (2019)
- Website: britishparking.co.uk

The British Parking Association (BPA), is a British-based trade association that focuses on parking and traffic management fields. The association is a company limited by guarantee, and non-profit organisation founded in 1968, though it was not registered until 1970.

== Description ==
The BPA is fully funded by its members.

The association's headquarters is in Haywards Heath, West Sussex. Parking News is its membership journal published six times a year for the BPA by James Pembroke Media Ltd.

The association publishes a list of its members and assets; there are currently over 740 corporate members as of 2025, which include manufacturers, suppliers, private car park operators, local authorities, providers of equipment hardware and technology software, health authorities, universities and colleges, airports, privately owned railway operating companies, shopping centres, bailiffs, debt collectors and consultants. Members, whether from the private or public sectors, pay a subscription fee based on their parking revenues. The BPA also offers membership for individuals and corporate organisations

== Safer Parking Scheme ==
The association managed the "Safer Parking Scheme"(formerly the Secured Car Parks Award) on behalf of the Police Crime Prevention Initiatives Ltd for over 20 years. The management of the Safer Parking/Park Mark initiatives returned to direct police oversight with effect from 1st April 2026.

The purpose of the scheme is to raise the standard of safety, security, design, and operation of UK car parks. Car parks that are found to meet the criteria set down by the scheme are awarded the Safer Parking Award. The award is made after inspection by an accredited assessor and is subject to re-assessment every 2 years.

The Safer Parking award may be granted to both council and privately operated car parks. In 2014 the Scheme celebrated its 10th anniversary since becoming the Safer Parking Scheme.

== Private parking enforcement ==
Advice and guidance for motorists parking on private land can be found on various websites including the BPA, Know Your Parking Rights, Citizens Advice and POPLA. Website forums such as Pepipoo and moneysavingexpert also debate the issues.

== Approved Operator Scheme and Code of Practice ==
The BPA's Approved Operator Scheme (AOS) launched in October 2007. The scheme is for BPA members that are involved in parking enforcement services on private land or in unregulated public car parks and was created after the DVLA announced it would only provide vehicle driver details to companies that joined an Accredited Trade Association. A condition of an ATA is that they have a Code of Practice in place. The BPA has been working with DVLA since their announcement, achieving ATA status and sharing all plans for the AOS with DVLA.

In complying with the Code, operators that are members of the AOS are able to demonstrate that their business operates to a set of standards and that it is recognised as an ostensibly professional and responsible member of the industry. However, if non-compliance to the Code is proven, it leads to sanctions being temporarily applied and could ultimately result in the member being suspended or expelled from the scheme.

== Keeper liability ==
Schedule 4 of the Protection of Freedoms Act 2012 allows parking operators to recover charges from vehicle keepers if certain conditions are met. This was introduced by the Government on the proviso that the parking sector provide the motorist with an Independent Appeals Service (IAS) and that the service is funded by the sector. On "relevant land", as defined by Sch. 4 para 3., the law allows the operator to recover any unpaid parking charges from the keeper of the vehicle, providing the requisite conditions are met.

Schedule 4 of the Protection of Freedoms Act 2012 applies only to England and Wales. Parking operators are therefore unable to recover unpaid parking charges from vehicle keepers in Scotland and Northern Ireland.

The potential introduction of Transport (Scotland) Act 2019 may introduce keeper liability to Scotland at a future date.

== Parking on Private Land Appeals (POPLA) ==
The Parking on Private Land Appeals (POPLA) is the independent appeals service established by the BPA and initially operated by London Councils from October 2012 to September 2015. Ombudsman Services took over as the service provider for POPLA on 1 October 2015. The service is now run by the Trust Alliance Group. The remit of POPLA to handle appeals by drivers and others wanting to challenge the issue of a parking charge notice issued by members of the BPA's Approved Operator Scheme on private land. POPLA only handles appeals after the recipient of the parking charge notice has been through the internal complaints procedures of the operator who issued the notice.

POPLA is available to all motorists who park on private land where parking is invited as well as locations where parking is not invited. POPLA is judicially independent when it comes to deciding the outcome of an appeal and their decision is binding on the operator only. The POPLA service is free to the motorist with the parking operator being charged a fee for every appeal that is considered. POPLA publishes an annual report which is available on its website.

At the official launch of POPLA, then Parliamentary Under Secretary of State for Transport Norman Baker welcomed the first annual report and the success of POPLA stating "This report shows that motorists are using this new free appeals service in significant numbers and, in more than half of cases, having their appeals upheld. This shows the new system is working for drivers and for the parking industry."

== Parking (Code of Practice) Act 2019 ==
In 2019 new legislation was passed when the Parking (Code of Practice) Act became part of the law. The BPA has consistently lobbied for change to introduce better regulation for the private parking sector. The Parking (Code of Practice) Act will bring in greater regulation of the private parking industry with a new independent appeals service, and all private parking operators will also have to follow a new industry backed Code of Practice. The Association set up the Approved Operator Scheme (AOS) in 2007 in response to concerns about the management of car parking on private land, an area of the parking profession in the United Kingdom which was at that time unlegislated. Members of the scheme are required to comply with the BPA's Code of Practice (CoP).

== Parking Charge Notices ==
Private car parks are managed by a private parking company, these can be at retail parks, healthcare facilities, universities, private residential areas and railway stations to name a few. A private parking company can issue a Parking Charge Notice (parking ticket) when a vehicle appears not to be complying with the rules and regulations. To manage parking on private land the operator must belong to an Accredited Trade Association in order to access keeper details from the DVLA, but in order to do so must adhere to the scheme's Code of Practice.

There are principles in contract law when applied to private parking, that the driver of a vehicle is invited by the parking operator (and/or the landowner) to park in a car parking site, and that the terms and conditions of the parking contract should be set out clearly and concisely through the placement of signs as upon entering and around the site. These are clearly specified in the BPA's Code of Practice for Parking on Private Land.

Operators do not have legal power to issue fines or penalties as a result of people parking on private land, as this is classed as misrepresentation of authority. They are able to issue a Parking Charge Notice (PCN) as specified in Schedule 4 of the Protection of Freedoms Act.

In parking at the site, a driver may have accepted those terms and conditions, provided they are clearly displayed, and the driver has read and understood them as set out in the case of Vine v London Borough of Waltham Forest [2000] EWCA Civ 106.

In his judgment, Lord Justice Roche stated:

The act of clamping the wheel of another person's car, even when that car is trespassing, is an act of trespass to that other persons property unless it can be shown that the owner of the car has consented to, or willingly assumed, the risk of his car being clamped. To show that the car owner consented or willingly assumed the risk of his car being clamped, it has to be established that the car owner was aware of the consequences of his parking his car so that it trespassed on the land of another. That will be done by establishing that the car owner saw and understood the significance of a warning notice or notices that cars in that place without permission were liable to be clamped. Normally the presence of notices which are posted where they are bound to be seen, for example at the entrance to a private car park, which are of a type which the car driver would be bound to have read, will lead to a finding that the car driver had knowledge of and appreciated the warning. In this case the Recorder might have reached such a conclusion about the appellant's state of knowledge, but he did not do so. The Recorder made a clear finding of fact that the appellant did not see the sign. That finding is not surprising in view of the absence of any notice on the wall opposite the southern parking space and the appellant's distressed state, the reason why the appellant parked and left her car hurriedly. It was the appellant's evidence that she did not see the sign. There was never any suggestion that the appellant was other than a truthful witness.

— Lord Justice Roche

In August 2010, the Coalition Government announced their intention to ban clamping on private land. The next two years saw the development and subsequent Royal Assent of the Protection of Freedoms Act which bans all forms of immobilisation without lawful authority.

The BPA welcomed the change as a move to marginalise rogue clampers, but felt that the legislation took away a valuable form of enforcement for landowners to use in the protection of their land. In order to ensure that private enforcement remained with a robust solution, the BPA's discussions with Government resulted in a form of keeper liability being introduced with the Protection of Freedoms Act, allowing the private operator in England and Wales to pursue the registered keeper of a vehicle if a named driver cannot be traced or denies liability.

Wheel clamping on private land was banned as of 1 October 2012 when the Protection of Freedoms Bill was passed into law.

On 10 July 2012, Martin Cutts of the Plain Language Commission made a speech at an event delivered by Landor Publishing "The Enforcement Summit '12" which was attended by some BPA executive members

I try to be fair but I've reluctantly formed the opinion that the BPA lacks the standards of integrity normally required of a Government-accredited trade association. My main evidence for this is what the BPA told the Government as it campaigned successfully to change the law on registered keeper liability. The BPA said 2–5% of its members' tickets were ending up in court, a huge number that in real figures is 36,000 to 90,000 a year, and that this would fall considerably, freeing up the courts' time, if registered keeper liability came in. The Government printed these figures twice as part of its evidence-base in the official impact assessment on the new law, swallowing the BPA argument whole. MPs were convinced, and the law was changed. But the BPA figures were false, and it's hard to imagine that the BPA – which claims to be the "recognized authority" on parking (BPA Masterplan 2012–13) – did not know they were false. The answer to a Freedom of Information request has shown that in 2011 only 845 cases from BPA private members were registered in the court system, and only 49 of them went before a judge for a final hearing. Not 90,000, not 36,000, but 49. A BPA spokesperson has tried to justify the phoney figures, saying: "I think the BPA's data was based on anecdotal conversations with the industry and it's certainly true that these were, a best estimate based on what operators are telling us." It all amounts to the fact that the BPA has conned the Government and it has conned MPs into changing the law.

— Martin Cutts

In a speech made at Europe's largest parking event Parkex on 10 June 2014, Parliamentary Under Secretary of State for Transport Robert Goodwill praised the private parking sector by saying that industry self-regulation can succeed and that the establishment of POPLA, providing motorists with independent and free appeals is testament to the high standards that are often promoted by parking professionals, who are providing well designed, fair and proportionate parking services.

== Media interest ==
Media interest in the association has changed over time. Although members of the BPA have previously had their actions featured on the BBC Consumer Affairs Programme Watchdog, media interest on the private parking profession has decreased since the introduction of the BPA's Approved Operator Scheme and launch of POPLA. The BPA regularly contribute to TV and radio broadcasts when private parking is debated. Consumer help websites including MoneySavingExpert.com forums, Pepipoo, Consumer Action Group also provide their own opinion on the profession.

== Combined Parking Solutions ==
On 30 August 2012 Combined Parking Solutions (CPS) was suspended from accessing the DVLA database for three months. The suspension was put in place as a result of CPS breaking the DVLA's rules on signage for privately issued parking tickets. The rules state(s) that parking companies must not make reference to liability by anyone other than the driver. On 14 June 2012, the DVLA sent a memo to the BPA about this issue and instructed them to put out a warning to their members. However, CPS was subsequently found to be in breach of this instruction on at least three separate occasions, and this resulted in their suspension. Being suspended from accessing the DVLA's registered keeper database will have had a major effect upon how CPS operates. Private parking companies use this database to find out who the registered keeper is of vehicles they wish to issue a ticket to so that they can send out demands for payment. Without this data, they have no way of trying to chase payment where the driver has not identified themselves (e.g. via an appeal). Further to this, the DVLA confirmed that CPS would not be able to retrospectively gather this data after the suspension ended or via another parking company. Furthermore, shortly before CPS was suspended, the British Parking Association had only just recently appointed a Combined Parking Solutions representative to the Board of its Approved Operator Scheme. They continued to be represented on the AOS Board and no further issues were been reported. Combined Parking Solutions ceased to be a member of the BPA in November 2014. As part of the BPA's changed Governance, the AOS Board ceased to exist in 2014. Approved Operator Scheme members are now represented on the BPA's Council of Representatives.
