= List of college visitors of the University of Cambridge =

This is a list of visitors of the constituent colleges of the University of Cambridge.

College	Visitor	Method of appointment
Christ's College	Chris Smith, Baron Smith of Finsbury	Chancellors of the University ex officio^{[note a]}
Churchill College	Philip Sales, Lord Sales	Appointed by the governing body of the college from among "those who hold or who have held high judicial office"^{[note b]}
Clare College	Chris Smith, Baron Smith of Finsbury	Chancellors of the University ex officio^{[note c]}
Clare Hall	Sir Colin Birss	Chancellors of the High Court ex officio
Corpus Christi College	Chris Smith, Baron Smith of Finsbury	Chancellors of the University ex officio
Darwin College	Sue Carr, Baroness Carr of Walton-on-the-Hill	Lords Chief Justices of England and Wales ex officio^{[note d]}
Downing College	The Crown	The Crown ex officio
Emmanuel College	Deborah Prentice	Vice-Chancellors of the University ex officio
Fitzwilliam College	Chris Smith, Baron Smith of Finsbury	Chancellors of the University ex officio
Girton College	Brenda Hale, Baroness Hale of Richmond	Elected by the governing body of the college^{[note e]}
Gonville and Caius College	The Crown	The Crown ex officio
Homerton College	Chris Smith, Baron Smith of Finsbury	Chancellors of the University ex officio
Hughes Hall	Chris Smith, Baron Smith of Finsbury	Chancellors of the University ex officio
Jesus College	Sarah Clark	Bishops of Ely ex officio
King's College	Stephen Conway	Bishops of Lincoln ex officio
Lucy Cavendish College	Chris Smith, Baron Smith of Finsbury	Chancellors of the University ex officio
Magdalene College	Richard Neville, 11th Baron Braybrooke	Barons Braybrooke ex officio
Murray Edwards College	Alan Watson, Baron Watson of Richmond	High Stewards of the University ex officio
Newnham College	Chris Smith, Baron Smith of Finsbury	Chancellors of the University ex officio^{[note f]}
Pembroke College	Philip Sales, Lord Sales	Elected by members of the society as provided in statute from "amongst the members of the Supreme Court of the United Kingdom" ^{[note g]}
Peterhouse	Sarah Clark	Bishops of Ely ex officio
Queens' College	Beverley McLachlin	Elected by the governing body of the college^{[note h]}
Robinson College	Chris Smith, Baron Smith of Finsbury	Chancellors of the University ex officio
St Catharine's College	The Crown	The Crown ex officio
St Edmund's College	Richard Moth	Archbishops of Westminster ex officio
St John's College	Sarah Clark	Bishops of Ely ex officio
Selwyn College	Dame Sarah Mullally	Archbishops of Canterbury ex officio
Sidney Sussex College	Philip Sidney, 2nd Viscount De L'Isle	Viscounts De L'Isle ex officio^{[note i]}
Trinity College	The Crown	The Crown ex officio
Trinity Hall	The Crown	The Crown ex officio
Wolfson College	Chris Smith, Baron Smith of Finsbury	Chancellors of the University ex officio

== Notes ==
^aStatute B.I(3): "When the office of Chancellor is vacant the powers of the Visitor shall be vested in the Vice-Chancellor of the University provided that he is not a member of the College."

^bStatute II.1: "There shall be a Visitor of the College who shall be appointed by the Governing Body from those who hold or who have held high judicial office."

^cStatute 2.4: "Any other duty assigned by these statutes to the Visitor, except that of interpreting the statutes, may at the Visitor’s request be discharged by the Vice-Chancellor of the University, provided that the Vice-Chancellor is not a member of the College."

^dStatute I.2: "The Visitor of the College shall be the Lord Chief Justice of England."

^eSupplemental Charter 28 July 1971: "…there shall always be a Visitor of the College elected by the Governing Body…"

^fStatute II.2: "The Visitor of the College shall be the Chancellor of the University if he will consent to act. In case of his refusal the Visitor shall be elected by the Governing Body."

^gOrdinance 3.1(4): "If no person has been elected to fill a vacancy in the Visitorship at the expiration of six months from the occurrence of a vacancy, the power of electing a person to fill the vacancy shall devolve on the Chancellor of the University."

^hStatute 2.I: "The Visitor shall be elected by the Governing Body."

^iStatute A.1: "…the Visitor of the College shall be the Viscount De L’Isle of Penshurst in the County of Kent, being the representative of the Sidney Family."
