= VMV College =

Higher-educational institution in Nagpur, India

VMV Commerce JMT Arts and JJP Science College, Nagpur
- Vrajlal Manilal Vasant Commerce, Jaydeoshankar Manishankar Thakar Arts and Jashbhai Jijibhai Patel Science College, Nagpur
- Type: Private
- Established: 1969 (57 years ago)
- Accreditation: NAAC Re-Accredited 'B' Grade
- Affiliations: Rashtrasant Tukadoji Maharaj Nagpur University
- Visitor: 199226
- Principal: Dr. Muralidhar Govindrao Chandekar
- Academic staff: 39
- Students: 3841
- Location: Wardhaman Nagar, Central Avenue, Nagpur, Maharashtra, 440008, India
- Campus: 3 acres (1.2 ha); Urban
- Language: Hindi, Marathi, English
- Nickname: VMV College
- Website: www.vmvjmtjjpc.edu.in

VMV Commerce JMT Arts and JJP Science College, commonly known as VMV College, established in 1969, is one of the oldest general degree colleges in Nagpur, Maharashtra. This college offers different courses in science, arts and commerce. It is affiliated to Rashtrasant Tukadoji Maharaj Nagpur University.

== Departments ==
- Commerce
- Hindi
- Marathi
- English
- History
- Economics
- Political Science
- Home Economics
- Physics
- Chemistry
- Mathematics
- Computer Department (BCA / B.Sc Data science/ B.Sc. Artificial intelligence/ BCCA / MCM)
- Master of Computer Application (MCA)
- Bachelor of Business Administration (BBA)
- Bachelor of Vocation
- Gujarati
- Physical Education
- Library

== Accreditation ==
The college is recognized by the University Grants Commission (UGC).
