= Temple Island Collections Ltd v New English Teas Ltd =

Temple Island v New English Teas was a case in the England and Wales Patents County Court, heard on 28 November 2011, in which Temple Island Collections Ltd. sued New English Teas Ltd. and Nicholas John Houghton over copyright infringement for using a monochrome image of the Houses of Parliament and London Bridge with a colour picture of a red London bus on the Westminster Bridge.

== Defence ==
The defence turned largely on the fact that similar works had been pre-existent and seen by the defendants before the creation of the image at issue. Some of these images pre-dated the work the claimant had created; some did not. The defence also drew attention to differences between the images.

== Judgment ==
Judge Birss QC, found for the claimant, as he found "the defendants' work does reproduce a substantial part of the claimant's artistic work."

Birss held that, while some aspects of the claimants' work were absent from the offending image, sufficient aspects were present to constitute copyright infringement, conversely he held that the claimant's submission of what would constitute an infringing work was over-broad saying "I am sure there are many things satisfying the claimant's definition which would not infringe."

Birss held that defence argument of prior works was irrelevant, since there was on the one hand no claim that the claimants work was influenced by these works, and on the other hand, there was a causal link between the defendants' desire to use an image like the claimant's image and the production of the offending image, that was not disturbed by the search for similar images.

== Controversy ==
The case caused some controversy, as appearing to widen the scope of copyright protection in the composition of visual images. Intellectual property barrister Jane Lambert expressed unease at the decision, over the move towards protection of idea rather than expression of an idea.
