= Total Car Parks =

British car park operator

Total Car Parks Limited
- Founded: 2008
- Headquarters: United Kingdom

Total Car Parks, established in 2008, is a British company with its head office in Colchester, UK. A member of the British Parking Association, the company operates car parks in various regions, in particular Manchester, using an online pre-payment model. Its aim, according to its head office, is to provide parking services to the average motorist at affordable prices.

== History ==
The firm launched a mobile-friendly webpage to facilitate pre-payment of tickets. This use of technology has led to an increase in accountability. It also sends the motorist a reminder 10 minutes before their ticket is due to expire, letting them know that they are in need of a new ticket. Other car parks have used this model of framework to their advantage.

Some of the car parks also have solar powered ticket machines and licence plate recognition technology.
