= Vine v London Borough of Waltham Forest =

2000 English legal case on wheel clamps

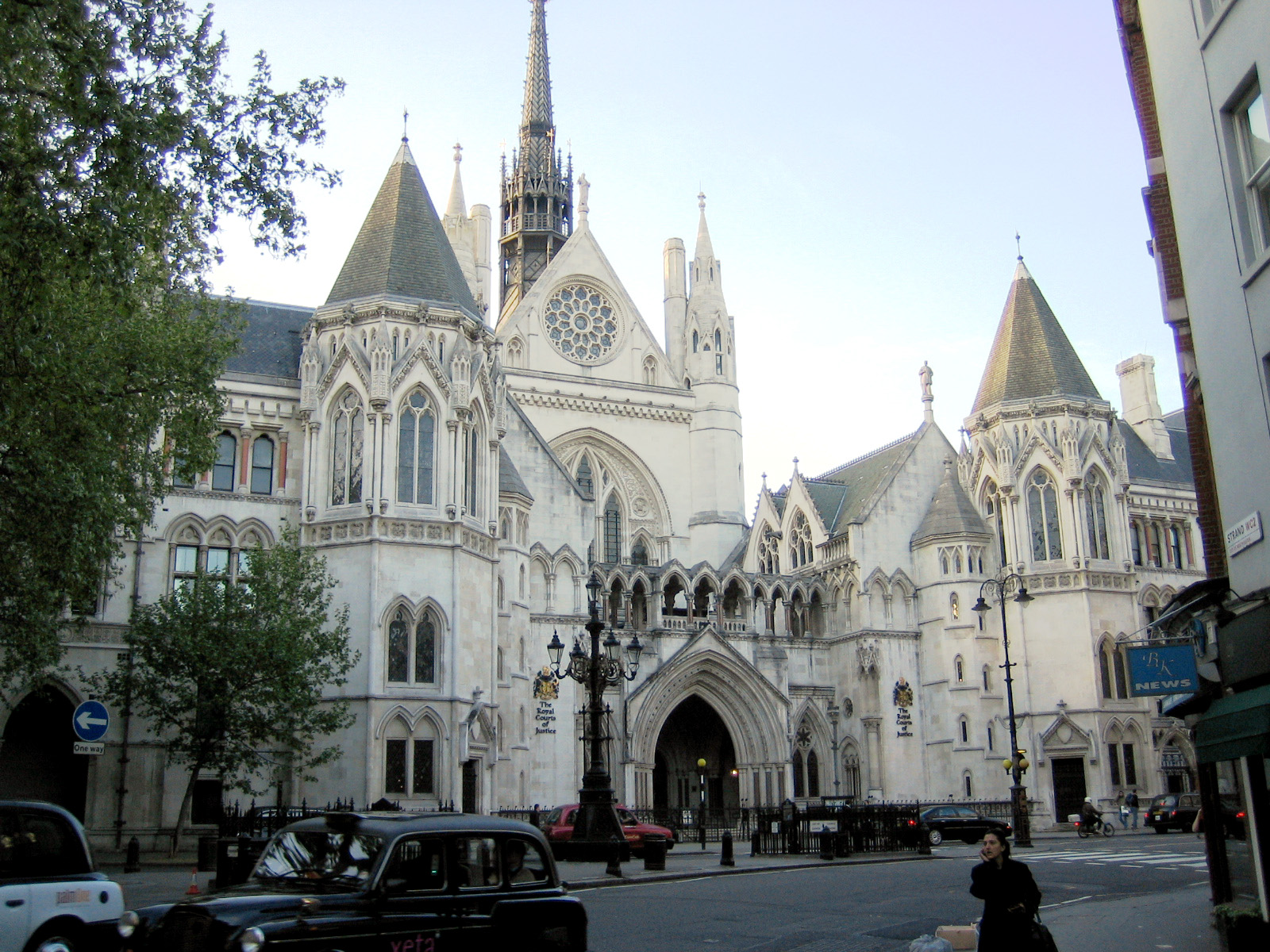
- Court: Court of Appeal
- Decided: 5 April 2000
- Citations: [2000] EWCA Civ 106, [2000] BLGR 481, [2000] 4 All ER 169, [2000] 1 WLR 2383, [2000] RTR 270
- Transcript: Full text of judgment

Case history
- Prior actions: Vine v London Borough of Waltham Forest, London County Court

Court membership
- Judges sitting: Roch LJ, Waller LJ and May LJ

Keywords
- Tort - Wrongful interference with goods - Cause of action - Parking on private property without authority - Immobilising a vehicle - Consent - Volenti non fit injuria.

Vine v London Borough of Waltham Forest was a case heard at the Court of Appeal of England and Wales in 2000 and set new case law with regard to the use of wheel clamps by establishing a legal precedent in relation to the concept of consent by expanding upon the decision in the case of Arthur & Another v Anker & Another [1996] 3 AER 783.

== Facts and initial hearing ==
The case arose out of an incident that had occurred in March 1997 when Ms Vine, the appellant, had parked her car in one of five parking spaces just off High Road, Leytonstone, in east London on land owned by the East London College. At that time the College issued licences to a limited number of people to use these spaces and, in turn, used a service provided by the respondent the London Borough of Waltham Forest to clamp or tow away unauthorised vehicles from them.

On the day in question Ms Vine, who that morning had been undergoing medical treatment at a nearby hospital and had just been informed that she needed an urgent operation, had suddenly felt unwell whilst driving home from the hospital. Unaware that they were on private property she hurriedly parked in one of the five spaces and stepped out and away from her car without seeing the signs warning of the possibility of clamping. She returned only three or four minutes later to discover that her car had been clamped by contractors operating on behalf of the London Borough of Waltham Forest.

The clamp was removed after some fifteen to twenty minutes, once Ms Vine had paid the release fee.

Later that year Ms Vine issued proceedings against the London Borough on the basis that they had wrongfully clamped her car. In their defence they in turn asserted that there was ample signage warning of the clamping of unauthorised vehicles and that their release fee did not represent an unreasonable charge.

The case was heard before the London County Court in May 1998 where the recorder, though very sympathetic towards Ms Vine, found in favour of the London borough. He was satisfied there was ample signage warning of the possibility of clamping and that these could have been seen by Ms Vine.

Ms Vine appealed and the matter came before the Court of Appeal on 5 April 2000.

== Judgment ==
The appellant's case was, essentially, that the recorder at the original hearing had erred in that although he had concluded that she had not seen the warning signs he failed to conclude that the clamping of her car was, as a consequence, a trespass.

The respondent stated that it was reasonable to infer from the recorder's judgment that as the signs were clearly visible that Ms Vine had therefore seen them and understood their content.

In allowing Ms Vine's appeal Roch LJ, said (Para. 19 of the judgment):

"The act of clamping the wheel of another person's car, even when that car is trespassing, is an act of trespass to that other persons property unless it can be shown that the owner of the car has consented to, or willingly assumed, the risk of his car being clamped. To show that the car owner consented or willingly assumed the risk of his car being clamped, it has to be established that the car owner was aware of the consequences of his parking his car so that it trespassed on the land of another. That will be done by establishing that the car owner saw and understood the significance of a warning notice or notices that cars in that place without permission were liable to be clamped. Normally the presence of notices which are posted where they are bound to be seen, for example at the entrance to a private car park, which are of a type which the car driver would be bound to have read, will lead to a finding that the car driver had knowledge of and appreciated the warning. In this case the recorder might have reached such a conclusion about the plaintiff's state of knowledge, but he did not do so. The recorder made a clear finding of fact that the plaintiff did not see the sign. That finding is not surprising in view of the absence of any notice on the wall opposite the southern parking space and the plaintiff's distressed state, the reason why the plaintiff parked and left her car hurriedly. It was the plaintiff's evidence that she did not see the sign. There was never any suggestion that the plaintiff was other than a truthful witness."

At paragraph 20 he went on to add:

"The Recorder held, correctly, that the plaintiff by parking her car where she did was trespassing. Unhappily, the recorder jumped to the conclusion that the plaintiff had consented to, or willingly assumed, the risk of her car being clamped. In making that leap the recorder fell into error, in my judgment. Consequently I am of the view that the recorder's decision on the basic issue in this case must be reversed."

— Lord Justice Roch

== Summary ==
In summary, the decision established that applying a wheel clamp to a vehicle constitutes a trespass to goods and that the onus remains with the clamper to demonstrate that the person parking the vehicle knew of the risks and happily took these on at the time that he parked the vehicle. Although it might reasonably be inferred that a motorist saw and understood the signs as a result of their numbers, size and location it was insufficient that an appellant had simply had the opportunity to see warning signs but that they must also have read and understood them and only then, by doing so, could they consent to the act of clamping if they parked in contravention to the notices.

By extension, it was held, if the fee was exorbitant then consent to its payment could not be implied.

Cases referred to:

Lloyd v Director of Public Prosecutions [1992] 1 All ER 982 - criminal offences
Arthur & Another v Anker & Another [1997] QB 564
Rookes - v - Barnard [1964] AC 1129 - as to damages only.
Metropolitan Water Board -v- Johnson and Co [1913] 3KB 900 - as to delay in court listing only.
Mendelssohn v Normand Ltd [1970] 1 QB177 - contractual terms
Thornton v Shoe Lane Parking Ltd [1971] 2 QB 163 - contracts in car parks

== See also ==
- English contract law
