= List of college visitors of the University of Oxford =

This is a list of visitors of the constituent colleges of the University of Oxford. Three of the university's 39 colleges, Kellogg College, Reuben College and St Cross College, do not have visitors, as they are societies of the university rather than independent colleges with a royal charter.

College	Visitor	Appointment	Since
All Souls College	Sarah Mullally	The Archbishop of Canterbury ex officio	2025
Balliol College	Robert Reed, Baron Reed of Allermuir	Elected by the Master and Fellows of the college (Note: When elected Visitor of Balliol, Lord Reed was serving as a Senator of the College of Justice. On becoming High Steward of the University in 2018, he became ex officio Visitor of Linacre and of Wolfson.)	2011
Brasenose College	vacant	The Bishop of Lincoln ex officio	2023
Christ Church	Charles III	The Crown	2022
Corpus Christi College	Philip Mounstephen	The Bishop of Winchester ex officio	2023
Exeter College	Mike Harrison	The Bishop of Exeter ex officio	2023
Green Templeton College	Sir John Chadwick	Elected by the governing body of the college	2011
Harris Manchester College	Saphié Ashtiany	Elected by the governing body of the college	
Hertford College	William Jefferson Hague, Baron Hague of Richmond	The Chancellor of the University of Oxford ex officio	2025
Jesus College	William Herbert, 18th Earl of Pembroke and 15th Earl of Montgomery	The Earl of Pembroke and Montgomery ex officio	2003
Keble College	Sarah Mullally	The Archbishop of Canterbury ex officio	2025
Lady Margaret Hall	William Jefferson Hague, Baron Hague of Richmond	The Chancellor of the University of Oxford ex officio	2025
Linacre College	Robert Reed, Baron Reed of Allermuir	The High Steward of the University of Oxford ex officio	2018
Lincoln College	vacant	The Bishop of Lincoln ex officio	2023
Magdalen College	Philip Mounstephen	The Bishop of Winchester ex officio	2023
Mansfield College	William Jefferson Hague, Baron Hague of Richmond	The Chancellor of the University of Oxford ex officio	2025
Merton College	Sarah Mullally	The Archbishop of Canterbury ex officio	2025
New College	Philip Mounstephen	The Bishop of Winchester ex officio	2023
Nuffield College	Sir Colin Birss	The Master of the Rolls ex officio	2026
Oriel College	Charles III	The Crown	2022
Pembroke College	William Jefferson Hague, Baron Hague of Richmond	The Chancellor of the University of Oxford ex officio	2025
The Queen's College	Stephen Cottrell	The Archbishop of York ex officio	2020
St Anne's College	Gavin Collins (acting)	The Bishop of Oxford ex officio	2016
St Antony's College	Charles III	The Crown	2022
St Catherine's College	Victor Adebowale, Baron Adebowale (Note: Following the death of HRH Prince Philip, Duke of Edinburgh, who was named as Visitor in the statutes at the foundation of the college in 1962.)	Elected by the governing body of the college	
St Edmund Hall	William Jefferson Hague, Baron Hague of Richmond	The Chancellor of the University of Oxford ex officio	2025
St Hilda's College	Elizabeth Butler-Sloss, Baroness Butler-Sloss	Elected by the governing body of the college from among "any person who holds or has held high judicial or ecclesiastical office or is a Member of Her Majesty's Privy Council" (Note: When elected, Lady Butler-Sloss was serving as President of the Family Division of the High Court.)	2002
St Hugh's College	Ingrid Simler, Lady Simler	Elected by the governing body of the college from among "any person who holds or has held high judicial or ecclesiastical office or is a Member of Her Majesty's Privy Council"	2024
St John's College	Philip Mounstephen	The Bishop of Winchester ex officio	2023
St Peter's College	Libby Lane	Appointed by the trustees of the college from among the diocesan bishops of the Church of England (Note: Lane is the incumbent Bishop of Derby.)	
Somerville College	William Jefferson Hague, Baron Hague of Richmond	The Chancellor of the University of Oxford ex officio	2025
Trinity College	Philip Mounstephen	The Bishop of Winchester ex officio	2023
University College	Charles III	The Crown	2022
Wadham College	Michael Beasley	The Bishop of Bath and Wells ex officio	2022
Wolfson College	Robert Reed, Baron Reed of Allermuir	The High Steward of the University of Oxford ex officio	2018
Worcester College	Sir Colin Birss	The Master of the Rolls ex officio	2026
