= Car boot =

Car boot may refer to:

- Boot (car), a storage space in a car
- Wheel clamp, a device to prevent a vehicle from being moved
- Car boot sale, a market where people sell unwanted possessions from their cars
