= Arthur v Anker =

1995 English legal case on wheel clamps

Arthur & Another v Anker & Another
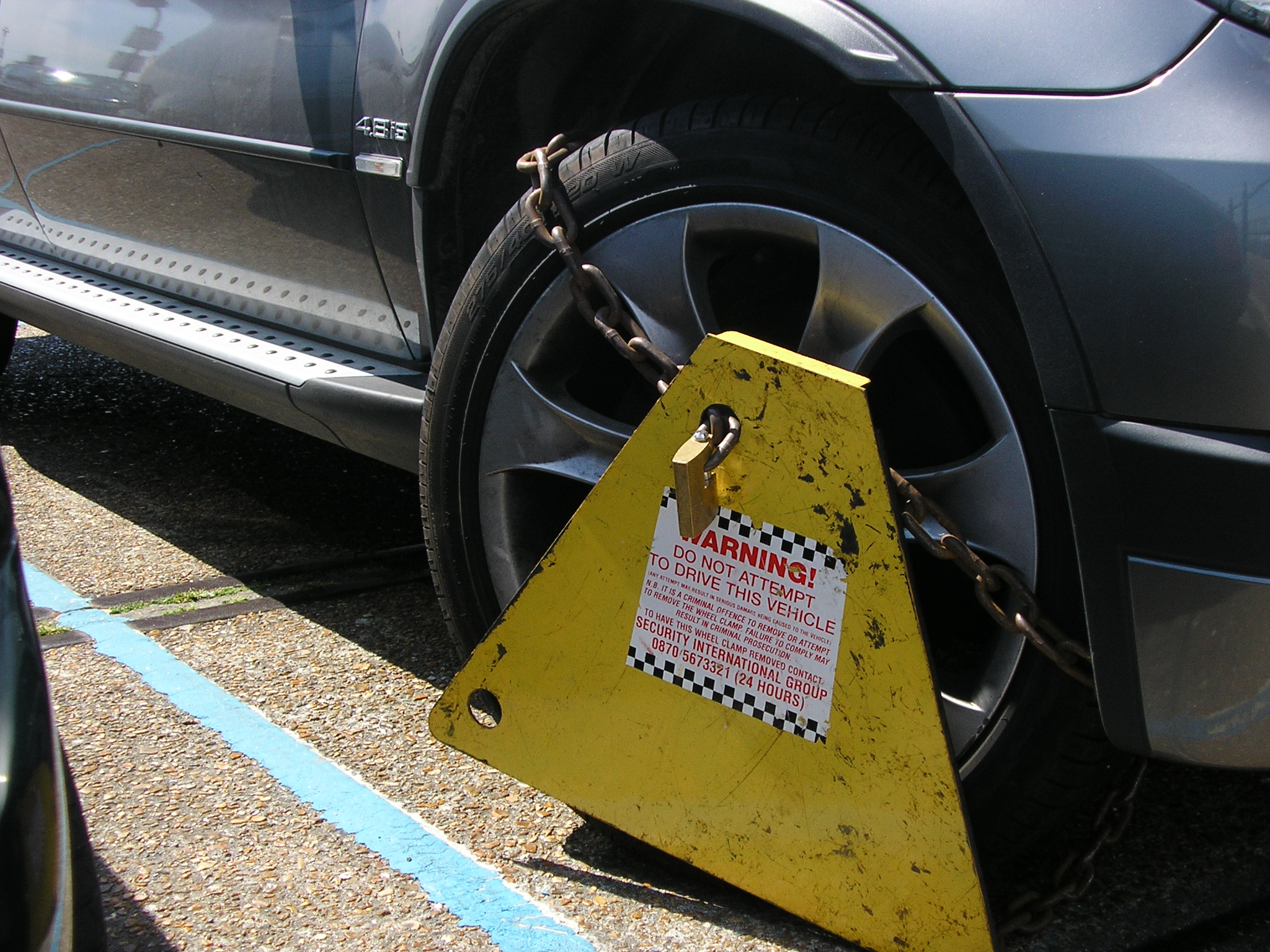
- Court: Court of Appeal
- Decided: 30 December 1995
- Citations: [1996] 3 AER 783 [1996] 2 WLR 602 [1996] 2 All E R 283 [1997] QB 564
- Transcript: Judgment (Word Document)

Case history
- Prior actions: Arthur & Another v Anker & Another, 30 April 1993, Truro County Court, before Judge Anthony Thompson QC

Court membership
- Judges sitting: Sir Thomas Bingham M.R., Neill LJ, Hirst LJ

Keywords
- Tort - Tortious interference - Cause of action - Parking on private property without authority - Immobilising a vehicle - Consent - Volenti non fit injuria.

Arthur & Another v Anker & Another is an English legal case that set new case law in respect of the use of wheel clamps to immobilise vehicles on private land and is regarded as the leading legal authority on the subject. The case established a legal precedent in relation to the use of wheel clamps and the concept of consent but some years later this was expanded upon in the case of Vine v London Borough of Waltham Forest.

== Facts & initial hearing ==
During the early afternoon of the 6 May 1992 the claimant, David Arthur, parked his car in an off-road area in Oak Street near the city centre of Truro in Cornwall. This area was privately owned and used by the leaseholders of local business premises as a car park for their use and that of their customers. It was not a public car park. Persistent abuse of the area by members of the public parking in it without permission or authority had caused obstruction and inconvenience and this led the leaseholders to engage the respondent, Thomas Anker's employers, Armtrac Security Services, in an effort to resolve the problem.

On being engaged, Armtrac erected a number of prominent notices warning those that parked in the area without authority or permission that it was private property and their vehicles were liable to being wheel clamped and might, also, be removed. The notices made clear that a release fee must be paid before a clamp was removed and that additional fees had to be paid if the vehicle was towed away. The prominence of the notices and the simplicity of the message they sought to convey was never at issue during the ensuing case.

Shortly after Mr Arthur parked his car, for which he had neither permission nor authority, Mr Anker came across it and on inspecting it and finding that no parking permit issued by the leaseholders was displayed he fitted a wheel clamp to it. Some forty-five minutes later Mr Arthur returned to his car and found that the clamp had been fitted to it. He refused to pay the release fee and Mr Anker refused to remove the clamp without the payment of the fee.

A prolonged and heated disagreement between the parties then followed that lasted into the early evening. During this Mrs Annette Arthur, who had arrived at the scene in another vehicle, assaulted Mr Anker, attempts were made to fit a wheel clamp to the vehicle she had been driving and Mr Arthur attempted, unsuccessfully to drive away in his car with the clamp still in place. Ultimately, the various parties departed and Mr Arthur's vehicle was left in the car park for the night with a second wheel clamp fitted to it. At some point during that night Mr Arthur returned and removed both wheel clamps. By the time that Mr Anker returned in the morning there was no sign of Mr Arthur's vehicle or of the wheel clamps, chains or padlocks.

At length, civil proceedings were initiated by the Arthurs and a counter suit issued by Mr Anker. This came before Truro County Court in April 1993 and was heard by Judge Anthony Thompson QC. The Arthurs sought to obtain aggravated and exemplary damages for malicious falsehood and tortious interference with their car. Mr Anker pleaded, by way of defence, that Mr Arthur had trespassed in the car park and that he was entitled therefore to fit the clamp, the notices warning of such had been seen by Mr Arthur who had effectively consented to the action. Mr Anker also claimed damages in respect of the assault by Mrs Arthur.

Judge Thompson found that Mr Arthur had been a trespasser from the outset and had importantly seen and understood the consequences of the warning signs. He also dismissed the argument, advanced by the Arthurs, that Mr Anker had committed the offences of theft and blackmail as set out in Black v Carmichael. The judge accepted the argument that Mr Anker's actions were founded in the ancient right of "self help" and that as the use of a car park space was a valuable commodity being prevented from using it as the result of the presence of a trespasser therefore incurred a loss. On this basis he found that the demand for £40 was reasonable. He further found that as Mr Arthur was fully aware of the warning contained in the prominent notices at the time he parked and that, as a consequence, he had consented to the clamping thereby rendering Mr Anker's actions lawful when they would otherwise have been tortious.

Mr and Mrs Arthur's case was rejected and Mr Anker was awarded damages in respect of the missing clamps and for the assault.

The Arthurs' appealed and the matter was transferred to the Court of Appeal

== Judgment ==
After considerable legal argument the judges dismissed the appeal.

They held that Mr Arthur was fully aware of the fact that he was trespassing and that by doing so he exposed himself to the risk of his vehicle being clamped. By entering onto the land and being aware of the risk he had consented to the clamping (Volenti non fit injuria - "to a willing person, injury is not done") and there had been no tortious interference with his vehicle on Mr Anker's part, by his fitting Mr Arthur's vehicle with a wheel clamp, as a consequence.

It was also held that a flat rate charge for the release of the clamp was appropriate - "a commercial figure covering the clamping firm's expenses plus an appropriate profit element" and that distress damage feasant (the distraining upon or withholding of goods involved in a trespass as a means of securing the payment of damages) did not apply in this case, as the judge at the original hearing had also decided. it was held that a mere trespass was insufficient and that some element of damage must be suffered. Such damage need not be physical but could be found in obstruction or denial of use but there no evidence of that in this case. In any event, based on the facts of this case, were distress damage feasant to be levied then the landowner or his agent could only seek the value of damages caused and nothing further.

Costs were awarded against the appellants.

== Subsequent events ==
On 1 October 2012, the clamping of vehicles on private land became a criminal offence as a consequence of the passing into law of the Protection of Freedoms Act 2012. However, the case remains relevant insofar as its interpretation extends to parking enforcement on private land.

=== Cases referred to ===
Smith v Baker & Sons [1891] AC 325 - (Volenti)
Cummings v Grainger [1977] QB 397 - (Consent)
Ashdown v Samuel Williams & Sons Ltd [1957] QB 409 - (Consent - verbal warning)
Lloyd v Director of Public Prosecutions [1992] 1 All ER 982 - (Consent - clamping)
Reynell v Champernoon [1631] Cro Car 228 - (Distress damage feasant)
Williams v Ladner [1798] 8 Dum & E 72 - (Distress damage feasant)
Ambergate, Nottingham and Boston and Eastern Junction Railway Co v Midland Railway Co [1853] 2 E & B 793 - (Distress damage feasant)
Boden v Roscoe [1894] 1 QB 604 - (Damage to land)
Sorrell v Paget [1950] 1 KB 252 - (Damage to land)
R v Howson [1966] 55 DLR 2d 582 - (Technical trespass insufficient for award of damages)
Controlled Parking Systems Ltd v Sedgwick [1980] 4 WWR 425 - (Necessity for actual damage) (Canadian case)
Jamieson's Tow & Salvage Ltd v Murray [1984] 2 NZLR 144 - (Necessity for actual damage) (New Zealand case)
Black v Carmichael [1992] SCCR 709 - (Finding that clamping amounted to theft and extortion) (Scottish case)
Silverstein v HM Advocate [1949] JC 160 (Legitimacy of demand) (Scottish case)
Bunch v Kennington [1841] 1 QB 679 (Property privileged from seizure without warning)

== Bibliography ==
- Clamping, Tony Weir, The Cambridge Law Journal, Vol. 55, No. 3 Nov., 1996, pp. 423–425
- Essential Tort Law, Richard Owen, Cavendish Publishing, Third Edition, 2000, p. 159
- Business Law, S.B. Marsh, J. Soulsby, McGraw-Hill Publishing. Eighth Edition, 2002, p. 100
