= Andrew Hopper =

British solicitor (1948–2018)

- Born: 1 October 1948
- Died: 25 July 2018 (aged 69)
- Occupation: Solicitor

Andrew Christopher Graham Hopper QC (1 October 1948 – 25 July 2018) was a British solicitor who practised on his own account in a niche practice concerned with professional regulation and discipline, principally in relation to solicitors.

He first acted for a solicitor before the Solicitors Disciplinary Tribunal in 1975; between 1979 and 2002 he advised and acted for the Law Society in disciplinary and regulatory proceedings, in matters before the Tribunal, the Divisional Court, the Court of Appeal and before the Master of the Rolls, and was the principal prosecutor in the Tribunal for over a decade.

He lately had an exclusively defence practice, but also acted for the Solicitors Disciplinary Tribunal itself when it became involved as a party to litigation, principally in claims for judicial review.

Hopper was joint general editor of Cordery on Legal Services, and was co-author of the Solicitor’s Handbook 2008, 2009, 2011 and 2012.

Hopper was admitted as solicitor in 1972, was appointed Queen's Counsel (Q.C.) in 2001, being the fifth solicitor appointed as QC. According to Chambers and Partners Hopper is "the oracle of all things relating to solicitors’ disciplinary proceedings".

Hopper advised Andrew Crossley of ACS:Law who was referred to the Solicitors Disciplinary Tribunal in relation to claims against people suspected of copyright infringement using peer-to-peer file sharing.

He developed cancer in 2017 and died in July 2018 at the age of 69.
