= Barnacle (surname) =

Barnacle is a surname. Notable people with the surname include:

- Gary Barnacle (born 1959), English musician
- Nora Barnacle (1884–1951), wife of author James Joyce
- Pete Barnacle, drummer for a variety of bands
- Thomas Barnacle (1846–1921), Irish trade unionist

== See also ==
- Neil Lyndon, (born 1946), English journalist and writer who was born "Neil Barnacle".
- Barnicle
