= Thermally Advantaged Chassis =

A Thermally Advantaged Chassis (TAC) is a computer enclosure that complies with the Thermally Advantaged Chassis specifications created by Intel. It is capable of maintaining an internal ambient temperature below 38 degrees Celsius when functioning with Intel's Pentium 4 and Celeron D processors based on 90 nm process technology, and an ambient temperature below 39 degrees Celsius when using a Pentium D processor. Intel maintains that using a thermally advantaged chassis is the absolute minimum requirement for using Pentium 4 (Prescott), Pentium D, and Celeron D, processors.

== Overview ==
In the 1.1 version, the TAC design is intended to disallow internal temperature rises of more than 3 degrees Celsius, and provide the processor with a cooler environment to work in. Its main feature is a Chassis Air Guide that directs room temperature air directly in the path of the CPU fan and heat sink. The chassis air guide is a passive cooling system, and relies completely on internal system fans to guide the air.

== Airflow pattern ==
As with most computers, the rear fan and power supply fan exhaust, moving hot air away from the computer. This causes a slight depressurization inside the chassis, and requires all other openings to become intake vents. Airflow from the front of the chassis moves around the Chassis Air Guide, allowing the processor fan to only draw air from outside the chassis, providing more effective cooling.

=== System fans ===
The rear chassis exhaust fan is required to be at least 92-mm or larger, providing a minimum of 55 CFM in free air. The processor is required to have an active cooling system, consisting of a fan and heat sink.

=== Side-panel venting ===
The side-panel is required to have an add-in card vent, which provides room temperature air to the add-in cards. High-performance graphics cards will benefit from the lower temperature air.
