= Barnicle =

Barnicle is a surname. Notable people with the surname include:

- George Barnicle (1917–1990), American baseball player
- Mary Elizabeth Barnicle (1891–1978), American folklorist, Medieval English literature professor, and activist
- Mike Barnicle (born 1943), American print and broadcast journalist, and social and political commentator

== See also ==
- Barnacle (surname)
- Barnacle
