= Barnacle (parking) =

Windshield-mounted enforcement device

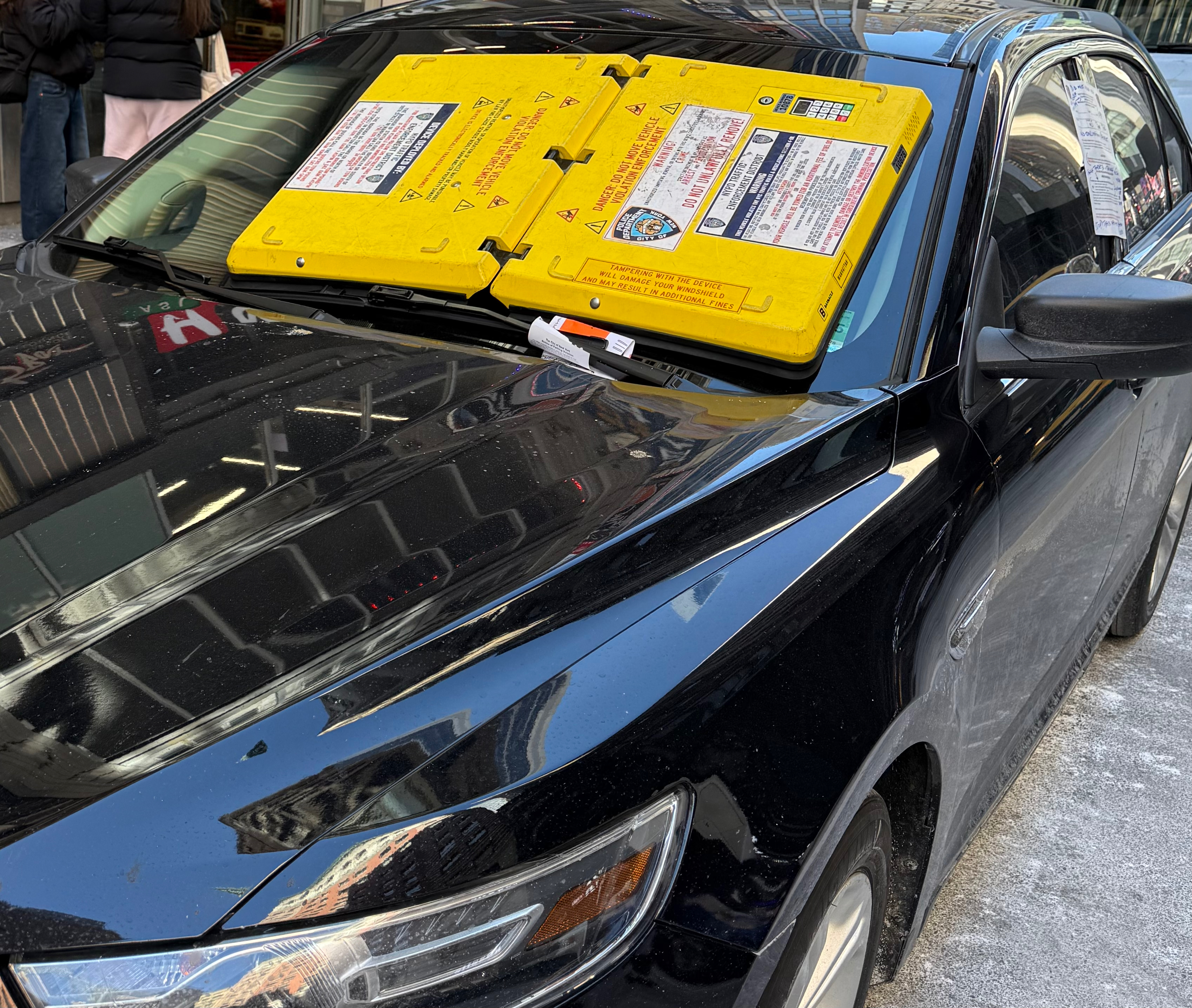
Barnacle on windshield

The Barnacle is a device that a parking enforcement officer attaches to a vehicle's windshield to prevent a driver from operating the vehicle until they resolve a parking violation. It attaches to a windshield using suction cups, but unlike a wheel clamp, does not physically prevent a vehicle from moving.

== Description ==
The Barnacle is a bright yellow, 20-pound (9.1 kg) piece of plastic that adheres to a windshield with 750 pounds-force (3,300 N) of force. It is equipped with an alarm that sounds if the vehicle is moved, and it has a keypad to input an unlock code so that the owner, after settling the parking violation, can release the device and drive away. It was introduced in 2016 by a company also named Barnacle, who envisioned drivers either delivering a deactivated Barnacle device to its owner or by using a ridesharing company to deliver it. Parking officials in Allentown, Pennsylvania and Fort Lauderdale, Florida were early testers of the Barnacle devices.

== Uses ==
The University of Oklahoma (OU) announced on January 14, 2020, that it would start using the Barnacle on illegally parked cars on its campus beginning on January 21. By January 16, OU students had figured out how to defeat the Barnacle using a variety of means, including by using a defogger and a credit card to release the suction cups, by blocking its signal with an aluminum Faraday cage, and by parking 12 decrepit cars as bait to exhaust OU's stock of Barnacle's devices. OU paused its deployment of the Barnacle before its start date. OU told students that they would be given 30 days' notice if the university decided to reintroduce the Barnacle.

In January 2020, a University of Houston (UH) student complained on Twitter about being charged $920 to remove the Barnacle from her car's windshield. She blamed the situation on a lack of available parking permits and affordable parking options. She also requested donations, while some users responded with humorous suggestions for removing the Barnacle herself. In response, the UH parking department stated that multiple parking options were available and explained that the Barnacle was used for repeat offenders with multiple unpaid parking violations. UH also outlined Barnacle costs and noted that charges may increase under certain circumstances.

In January 2022, the city of Bend, Oregon introduced the Barnacle as it resumed citing parking violators after a pause during the COVID-19 pandemic.

In October 2023, WPVI-TV news reporters found that a private towing service in Philadelphia, within minutes of a car's paid parking time expiring, adhered a Barnacle to the car's windshield, and demanded $475 upfront to release the device, of which $300 would be refunded after the driver returned the device in a nearby bin. The Philadelphia City Council intended to hold hearings about windshield-obscuring devices, which may violate a 2016 "ticket-to-tow" law that bans private lot operators from towing or immobilizing vehicles unless they have been ticketed by law enforcement authorities. In February 2024, although the city council had not yet regulated Barnacle devices, the tow operator in question lowered its net fee from $175 to $75.

In December 2023, drivers in downtown Raleigh, North Carolina complained that local private parking companies were charging hundreds of dollars to remove Barnacle devices from windshields, frustrating owners and customers of nearby businesses.
