= Intellectual Property Enterprise Court =

Intellectual property adjudication body in England and Wales

- IPEC
- Established: 1990
- Location: Rolls Building, Fetter Lane, London; Manchester Civil Justice Centre (small claims)
- Authorised by: High Court of Justice

Judge
- Currently: Richard Hacon

The Intellectual Property Enterprise Court (IPEC; previously the Patents County Court or PCC) in London is an alternative venue within the High Court of England and Wales for bringing legal actions involving intellectual property matters such as patents, registered designs, trade marks, unregistered design rights and copyright. Hearings are usually conducted in the at the Rolls Building in Fetter Lane, or in the Manchester Civil Justice Centre (or a number of other regional venues) for small claims.

== Original establishment ==
Originally established in 1990 by an order made under Section 287 (1) of the Copyright, Designs and Patents Act 1988, the intention was that the PCC should be a forum where simpler cases could be dealt with under a cheaper and more streamlined procedure than the High Court. In practice, following the Woolf Reforms of 1998, the streamlined procedure was then available in all courts. One remaining difference was that cases at the PCC could be argued by solicitors or patent attorneys, rather than having to be presented by separate qualified barristers.

== 2010 revitalisation ==
In order to revitalise the court and provide some procedural distinction from the High Court, a new set of procedural rules were introduced in Autumn 2010, at the same time that (as he then was) His Honour Colin Birss was appointed as the judge of the PCC. These rules meant that much more detail was required in the particulars of claim (the document that sets out the claimant's case), the procedure as a whole was streamlined further (no disclosure, no examination in chief of expert witness, tight control by the Judge of the issues that go to trial) and financial limits were introduced to both the damages (at £500,000) and the legal costs (at £50,000, now £60,000, with an additional cap per stage) recoverable. Trials should last no more than two days. The revitalised court has been generally viewed as a success.

== Move to the High Court ==
As of 1 October 2013, the PCC was reformulated as the Intellectual Property Enterprise Court, a specialist subdivision of the Business and Property Courts within the High Court. Whilst the IPEC is now part of the High Court, Patent and Trade Mark attorneys retain their rights of audience and litigation.

Cases can be transferred from the IPEC list to be heard by the main High Court at the discretion of the IPEC; the High Court also routinely transfers cases from its list to the IPEC. As with the High Court, appeals from IPEC decisions (if leave to appeal is granted) are heard by the Court of Appeal.

== Judges ==
Cases are heard by the judge or an appointed deputy judge. Since the founding of the court, there have been four judges:

- September 1990 to September 2000 : Peter Ford
- Autumn 2001 to Autumn 2010 : Judge Michael Fysh QC
- Autumn 2010 to Summer 2013: Colin Birss QC
- December 2013 onward: Richard Hacon
