= Chassis Air Guide =

Chassis Air Guide or CAG in abbreviation, is Intel's thermal system to PC chassis.

The system includes an air duct for CPU, because in an environment of increasing thermal loads, the processor is generally the most demanding component in terms of system thermal design.

It also describes optimal locations for intake and exhaust fans.

Lower chassis temperature brings lower processor die temperature, while most computer enclosures typically provide an internal thermal environment of approximately 40-45°C at a 35°C room, Intel claims. CAG provides a system to lower processor's thermal environment.

The initial revision known as CAG 1.0 was released in May 2002. The recent version known as CAG 1.1 was then released in September 2003.

== See also ==
- Thermally Advantaged Chassis
