= Visitor =

Overseer of an autonomous institution

A visitor, in English and Welsh law and history, is an overseer of an autonomous ecclesiastical or eleemosynary institution, often a charitable institution set up for the perpetual distribution of the founder's alms and bounty, who can intervene in the internal affairs of that institution. Those with such visitors are mainly chapters, chapels, schools, colleges, universities, and hospitals.

== England and Wales ==
The office of visitor arose in church government and the visitor of an ecclesiastical corporations is normally the bishop of that diocese. Outside of the church, visitors are sometimes appointed for eleemosynary foundations (those established for the perpetual distribution of the alms or bounty of the founder), such as hospitals or colleges. Blackstone, in his Commentaries on the Laws of England (1765), saw the crown as having visitorial jurisdiction over all civil corporations (i.e., non-eleemosynary lay corporations), with this being exercised through the courts.

Many visitors hold the office ex officio, as the British monarch (often exercised through the Lord President of the Council), the archbishop or bishop of a particular diocese, (Note: e.g., the Bishop of St Davids (or nominee) as visitor of University of Wales Trinity St Davids and the Bishop of Durham as visitor of Durham University) or as a senior member of the judiciary. (Note: e.g., the Master of the Rolls as visitor of University College London) Bishops are usually the visitors to their own cathedrals.

All eleemosynary corporations have a visitor as a necessity incident of their foundation; where no visitor is named, the sovereign is the visitor. Prior to the Constitutional Reform Act 2005, the sovereign's visitorial jurisdiction was delegated to the Lord Chancellor; powers concerning the visitorial function of the crown are now part of the ministerial prerogative powers of the UK government.

=== Universities and colleges ===
According to Farrington, visitorial jurisdiction in universities is derived from the rectorial jurisdiction of medieval European universities as well as the rights of the founder of an eleemosynary (charitable) foundation. This links the university or college visitor to the rector of a Scottish university, who originally exercised jurisdiction over most disputes both within the university and between the university and the townsfolk.

Universities and colleges in England and Wales established by royal charter are charitable corporations that have a visitor; if no visitor is specified in the charter, or if none has been appointed, then the monarch is the visitor. Other universities and colleges may have a visitor, if established as a charitable foundation whose founder has specified a visitor. Such foundations include Newcastle University and Royal Holloway, University of London, both established by local acts of Parliament, and St Chad's College, Durham, incorporated as a charitable company, while Canterbury Christ Church University had a visitor when operating as a charitable trust.

The right of the visitor, and not the courts, to adjudge on alleged deviations from the statutes of academic colleges was affirmed in the case of Philips v. Bury, 1694, in which the House of Lords overruled a judgment of the Court of King's Bench.

The first university (as opposed to college) in England and Wales to be constituted as an eleemosynary foundation and thus to have a visitor was Durham University, under the Durham University Act 1832. Following this, other universities were established with visitors by royal charter or act of parliament until 1992. The post-1992 universities do not have visitors. The colleges of Oxford and Cambridge universities are, with the exception of some modern foundations, eleemosynary corporations and thus have visitors, but the universities themselves are civil corporations and thus do not have visitors.

The Education Reform Act 1988 transferred jurisdiction for most employment disputes in universities to employment tribunals, and the Higher Education Act 2004 transferred the jurisdiction of visitors over the grievances of students in English and Welsh universities to the Office of the Independent Adjudicator.

The residual powers remaining to the visitor in higher education include the interpretation and enforcement of the charter and statutes, issues over membership of committees and the appointment or dismissal of officers of the institution, compliance with the charitable objectives defined by the founder, and disputes between academics and the institution that are not employment disputes or that have been otherwise transferred to the courts or tribunals. Decisions of the visitor are subject to judicial review for failure to apply the rules of natural justice or for lack of jurisdiction, but not for errors in fact or law. For areas within their jurisdiction, the visitor has "untrammelled power to investigate and right wrongs arising from the application of the domestic laws of the chartered institution". (Note: R v University of London, ex p Vijayatunga [1988] QB 322 at 344, 345, per Simon Brown LJ, quoted by) This might extend, according to Lord Browne-Wilkinson, to having the power to remove the university council or revoke the charter in extreme cases.

There were 51 higher education providers in England with visitors in 2026.

=== Medical schools ===
Under the Medical Act 1983, the General Medical Council may appoint visitors to medical schools to report on "the sufficiency of the instruction given in the places which they visit and as to any other matters relating to the instruction which may be specified".

== Other jurisdictions ==
The office also exists in other common-law jurisdictions that have followed the model of England and Wales.

=== Australia ===
Governors of the Australian states often serve as visitor ex oficio of schools and universities.

The University Acts (Amendment) Act 1996 made the Governor of Victoria the visitor of Ballarat (now Federation), Deakin, La Trobe, Melbourne, Monash, RMIT, and Victoria universities.

The Governor of New South Wales is the visitor to Macquarie, Sydney and Wollongong universities under various acts. Only ceremonial duties can be exercised by the governor in their role as visitor of the universities. They are also visitor of Sydney Grammar School, with "authority to do all things which pertain to visitors".

The Governor of Queensland is the official visitor to Brisbane Girls Grammar School, Brisbane Grammar School and the University of Queensland.

=== Canada ===
Prince Philip, Duke of Edinburgh, as a member of the Canadian royal family, served as the visitor to Upper Canada College from 1955 to his death in 2021. Prior to this, Prince Edward, Prince of Wales, acted as the school's visitor between 1919 and 1936.

The governor general of Canada, as the King's representative, serves as the visitor to McGill University. Similarly, the lieutenant governor of Ontario serves as the visitor to the University of Western Ontario in London, Ontario, and the lieutenant governor of Newfoundland and Labrador serves as the visitor to Memorial University of Newfoundland.

The Anglican Bishop of Montreal serves as the visitor to Bishop's University in Lennoxville, Quebec, and the Anglican Bishop of Huron serves as the visitor to Renison University College in Waterloo, Ontario.

=== Fiji ===
In Fiji, the Court of Appeal in Muma v University of the South Pacificdeclared that in default of appointment, the country's president was the visitor of a university established by the Queen, since Fiji had subsequently become a republic.

=== India ===
In India, the President of India is the visitor to 126 central government institutes, such as the Indian Institutes of Technology.

=== Ireland ===
Visitation was introduced to Ireland by the charter of Trinity College Dublin in 1592. In the modern Republic of Ireland, the Universities Act 1997 redefined the appointment, function and responsibility of visitors. Where a university does not have a visitor, the government may appoint a current or retired judge of the High Court or a retired judge of the Supreme Court as visitor under this act. The act also defined the visitor's responsibility as being to enquire into situations where "there are reasonable grounds for contending that the functions of a university are being performed in a manner which prima facie constitutes a breach of the laws, statutes or ordinances applicable to the university" at the request of the Minister for Education.

=== Nigeria ===
In Nigeria, the visitor in publicly funded tertiary institution is the most senior member of government. This is usually the president in federally-funded universities or the governor for state-funded universities.

=== Northern Ireland ===
Visitorial jurisdiction over most student complaints was removed by the Public Services Ombudsman Act (Northern Ireland) 2016, which transferred responsibility to the Northern Ireland Public Services Ombudsman.

=== United States ===
In the United States, the office of visitor, from its early use at some colleges and other institutions, evolved specifically into that of a trustee. Certain colleges and universities, particularly of an earlier, often colonial founding, are governed by boards of visitors, often chaired by a rector (rather than regents or trustees, etc.). Examples include the College of William and Mary and the University of Virginia.

== In literature ==
In the Jill Paton Walsh continuation of the Lord Peter Wimsey series of detective novels, The Late Scholar, Lord Peter (now the Duke of Denver) is the visitor of the fictional St Severin's College in Oxford, which is central to the plot.

== See also ==
- Apostolic visitor
- Provincial episcopal visitor
- List of college visitors of the University of Oxford
- List of college visitors of the University of Cambridge
- List of chancellors and vice-chancellors of British universities (includes visitors for those universities that have them)
