= Thomas Barnacle =

Thomas Barnacle (1846 – 9 July 1921) from Galway, Ireland was the father of Nora Barnacle and father-in-law of the novelist, James Joyce.

Barnacle was active in the trade unions from the 1860s to the 1890s. Though illiterate, he had a trade as a well-skilled baker—the family line of work—and was much in demand till the end of his life. He often freelanced beyond the town in such places as Oughterard.

He married Annie Honoria Healy in 1881 and they had children Mary, Nora, Bridget (known as Delia), Thomas, and Kathleen (born 1896). One other boy died in infancy, and two other daughters are known to have been born to the couple.

Thomas and Annie moved house some seven times by 1904, all in lowly working-class districts of Galway such as Newtownsmyth, Raleigh Row, and Abbeygate Street, before eventually settling at number 8 (now number 4) Bowling Green, an L-shaped street below the church of St. Nicholas.

Sometime around 1896, Annie threw Thomas out of the house due to his severe drinking which had led to the loss of his bakery shop. However, he remained in demand as a journeyman baker.

While his son-in-law James Joyce (who never met him) depicted him as rough, irresponsible man, Thomas himself was very well liked by all who knew him, and was remembered very fondly by his daughter Nora. Many years later, Nora wrote to her sister Kathleen, of Joyce: "He's a weakling, Kathleen. I always have to be after his tail. I wish I was married to a man like my father." Nora Barnacle's Galway biographer, Padriag Ó Laoi noted him as a genial man of five foot nine, good humored and an excellent storyteller and stated that "True, he took a drink, but he never disgraced his family".

Barnacle died in 1921, having been nursed during his illness by his estranged wife, Annie.
