= Barnacle (slang) =

The word barnacle is slang term in electrical engineering that indicates a change to a product on the manufacturing floor that was not part of the original product design. A barnacle typically corrects a product defect or adds new functionality. A barnacle is normally a quick fix pending a product redesign that incorporates the barnacle into the actual product. Technical personnel may also add a barnacle in the field to correct or enhance a design.

== Origin ==
The term appears to have originated from the barnacle—an animal that attaches itself to rocks, docks, ships, whales, and other objects. A barnacle in electronics is something added to the manufactured product. Typically a barnacle on a circuit board is very noticeable, much like the living barnacle on a rock or ship.

== Use in software ==
The term was originally used with electronic hardware, but spread the software industry, which uses it to describe software added to a system. The software meaning is code added as an expedient. A software barnacle may also refer to malware or spyware inserted into a computing system illegally.

== Examples ==
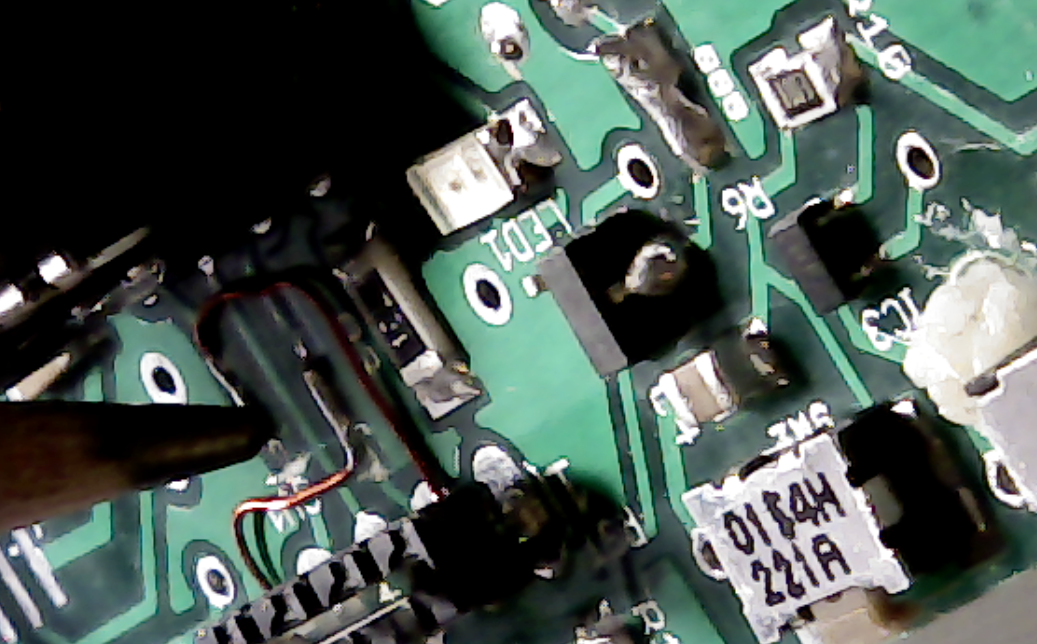
A 'barnacle' or engineering prototype fix in the form of wires and cut tracks on a printed circuit board

On printed circuit boards, a barnacle may be as simple as cutting a trace, soldering a wire to connect two points on the circuit board, or adding a component such as a resistor or capacitor. A barnacle may also be a complex subassembly or daughterboard. Barnacles in hardware assemblies allow an engineer to repair design errors, experiment with design changes or enhancements, or otherwise alter circuit behaviour.

Usually, a barnacle-implemented change is incorporated into a new fabrication cycle circuit before production, but there can be final-assembly barnacles. In such cases, engineers have determined it is less expensive to ship the product with a barnacle rather than redo the design.

== Use ==
Normal hardware development cycle contains two main phases. First is the development and prototype phase, in which engineers fist design and prototype the hardware (and often simulated it with a computer program such as PSpice). They typically manufactured the device in low quantity for testing. In the second phase, they update design documents based on testing and begin general manufacturing.

The testing phases usually reveal problems not found by the design process and simulation tools, which can't duplicate some environmental and electrical circumstances. During testing, engineers often use barnacles to patch (computing) or correct the hardware so they can continue testing in the face of defects (failures or faults). Ading barnacles at this phase reduces development costs by testing prototype hardware for as long as possible, before updating the design documentation or making a new version of the prototype.

During general manufacturing, the product may sometimes be used in circumstances that the specifications intended—but that reveal problems when they test the product in those circumstances. Engineering typically performs a root cause analysis to find the root cause of the problem. In some cases they must make manufacturing changes, such introducing trace contaminants during some phase of testing. In other cases, the problem in the design itself and requires a deeper change.

When possible, engineers design a barnacle so it can be applied to existing products. When possible, that spares the need to scrap and replace existing units do not need to be scrapped and replaced so in this case the use of a barnacle is an economic decision. The barnacle may be field installed or may require a product recall.

== See also ==
- Electronic design automation
- Electronic engineering
- Engineering
- Product design
- Product lifecycle management
- Product management
- Technical standard
