= Colin Birss =

English judge

The Right Honourable Sir Colin Birss
- Royal coat of arms of the United Kingdom

Master of the Rolls
- Incumbent
- Assumed office 1 November 2026
- Preceded by: Sir Geoffrey Vos

President of the Business and Property Division (Note: Chancellor of the High Court until 1 October 2026)
- In office 1 November 2025 – 1 November 2026
- Preceded by: Sir Julian Flaux

Lord Justice of Appeal
- In office 8 February 2021 – 1 November 2025

Justice of the High Court
- In office 13 May 2013 – 7 February 2021

Personal details
- Born: December 1964 (age 61) Thurso, Scotland
- Education: Downing College, Cambridge

Sir Colin Ian Birss (born December 1964) is an English judge who has served as Master of the Rolls since November 2026. He was the President of the Business and Property Division from 2025 to 2026.

== Career ==
Birss attended Largs Academy and then Lancaster Royal Grammar School. He graduated from Downing College, Cambridge in 1986 with a first class honours degree in metallurgy and materials sciences. Birss worked for Arthur Andersen until 1988 and after legal training at City University London he was called to the bar at Middle Temple in 1990, joining Three New Square, a specialist intellectual property set of barristers' chambers.

Birss was made a Queen's Counsel in 2008. He was appointed a Specialist Circuit Judge on 5 October 2010 and assigned to the Patents County Court in 2010 and authorised to sit as a deputy High Court judge. On 13 May 2013, he was appointed a High Court judge, assigned to the Chancery Division, and received the customary knighthood in the 2013 Special Honours. He was appointed a Lord Justice of Appeal on 8 February 2021. Upon his elevation to the Court of Appeal, he was appointed Deputy Head of Civil Justice in England and Wales.

On 9 July 2026, it was announced that Birss had been appointed as Master of the Rolls following the retirement of Sir Geoffrey Vos on 31 October 2026.

== Cases ==
In 2011 he sat on the controversial case brought by ACS Law on behalf of MediaCAT, relating to file downloading on peer-to-peer filesharing networks.

In 2012 he ruled on Temple Island v New English Teas, a case where a photograph of an AEC Routemaster London bus crossing Westminster Bridge was found sufficiently similar to another photograph of the subject to constitute copyright infringement.

In July 2012, Birss, sitting in the High Court, ruled that Samsung did not infringe Apple's registered design right in its iPad tablet. The judgment mirrored the decision made earlier in the US by a jury. In October 2012 the Court of Appeal upheld the judgment, including the publicity order imposed on Apple because it was necessary to clear up uncertainty in the market place after Apple took legal action in Germany against Samsung. The order required Apple to publicise that it had lost the case on its website and in the media. The Court of Appeal said:

because this case (and parallel cases in other countries) has generated much publicity, it will avoid confusion to say what this case is about and not about. It is not about whether Samsung copied Apple's iPad. Infringement of a registered design does not involve any question of whether there was copying: the issue is simply whether the accused design is too close to the registered design according to the test laid down in the law.

Birss is the first UK court of appeal judge to admit having used ChatGPT-generated content in a judgement, saying he found it "jolly useful".

== Personal life ==
Birss lives with his wife and their three children at their family home in Hertfordshire. His recreations include beekeeping.
