= Wheel clamp =

Device designed to prevent motor vehicles from being moved

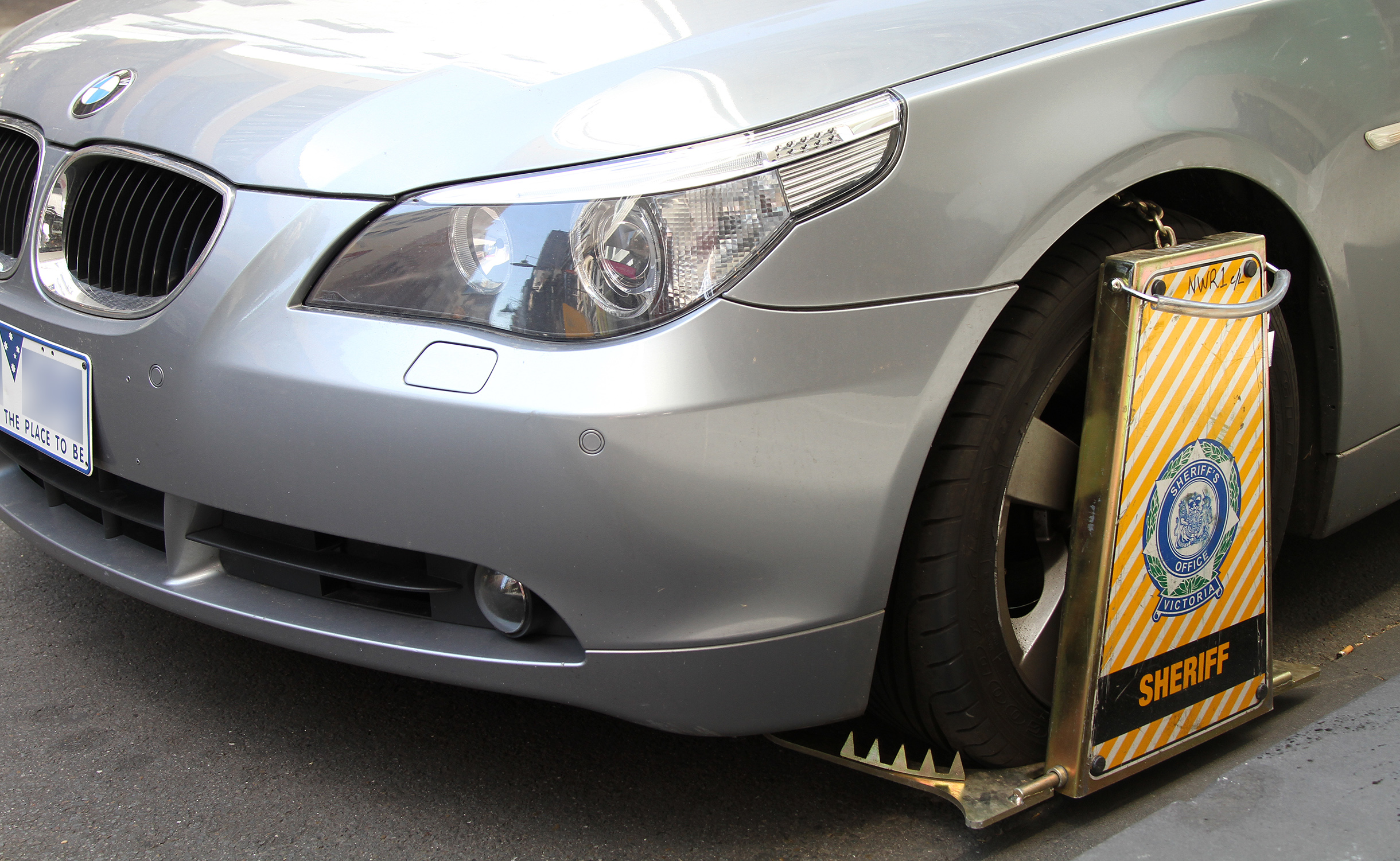
A modern wheel clamp placed on a BMW E60 5 Series for a parking violation in Melbourne by the Victorian Sheriff; note the tire spikes and panel preventing the vehicle being driven or the wheel being removed

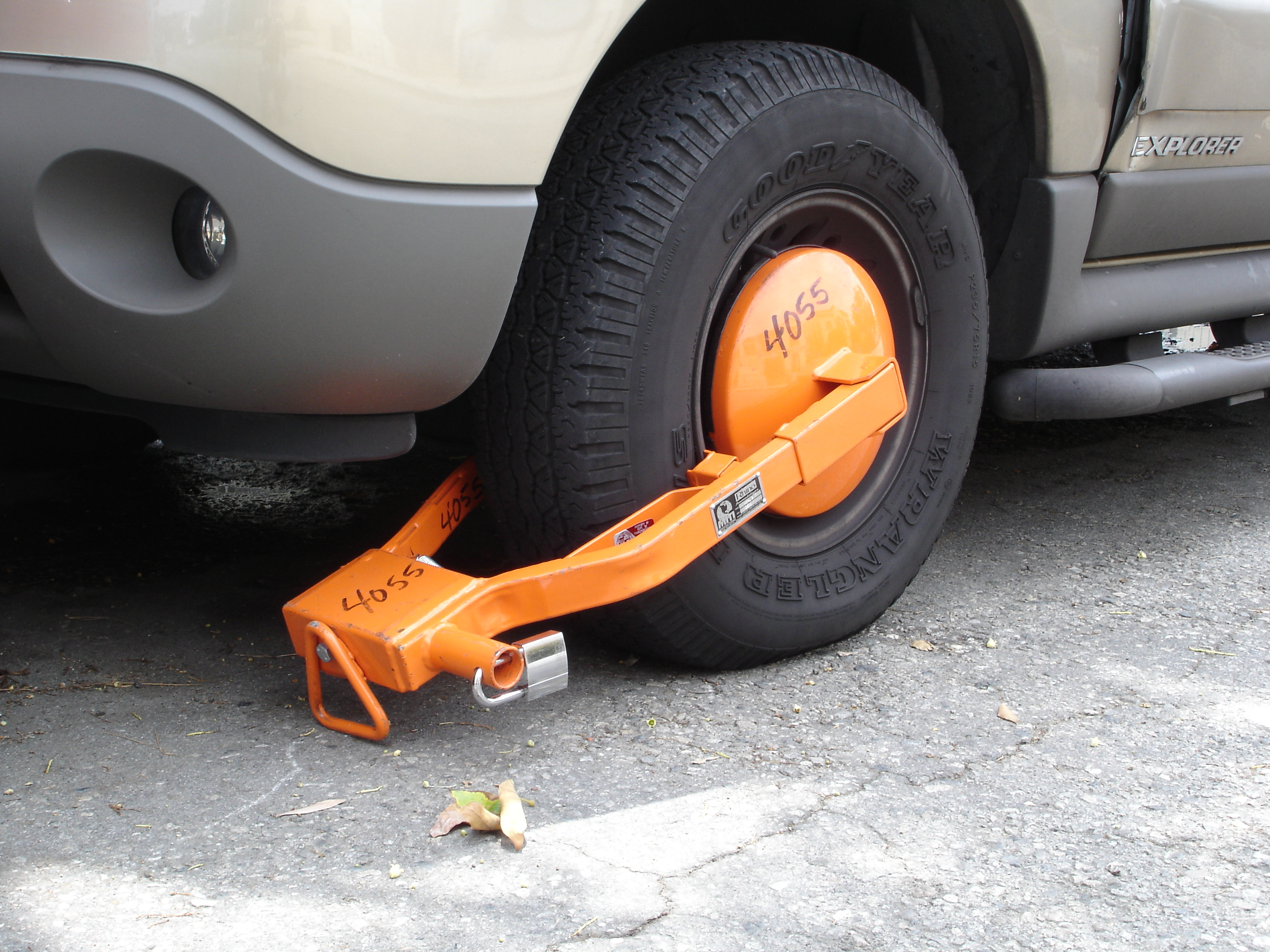
Wheel clamp as used by the Los Angeles Department of Transportation

A wheel clamp, also known as wheel boot, parking boot, Denver boot, or wheel lock, is a device that is designed to prevent motor vehicles from being moved. In its most common form, it consists of a clamp that surrounds a vehicle wheel, designed to prevent removal of both itself and the wheel.

In the United States, the device became known as a "Denver boot" after the city of Denver, Colorado, which was the first place in the country to employ them, mostly to force the payment of outstanding parking tickets.

While primarily associated with law enforcement and parking violations, a variety of wheel clamps are now available to consumers as theft deterrent devices for personal use as an alternative to the steering-wheel lock.

== Functions ==
Wheel clamps have five main functions:

- To punish unauthorised or illegal parking, in lieu of towing the offending vehicle; in these cases, police or property owners who place the clamp may charge a high "release fee" to remove it
- To enforce unpaid fines previously applied to the vehicle; a certain number of nonpayments or time elapsed from the issuance of the most recent fine results in clamping upon the next violation
- To prevent driving by a suspended driver or moving of a disabled vehicle
- To preclude escape of a prosecuted person
- For security purposes, such as preventing a car, trailer, or caravan from being driven or towed away by a thief

== History ==
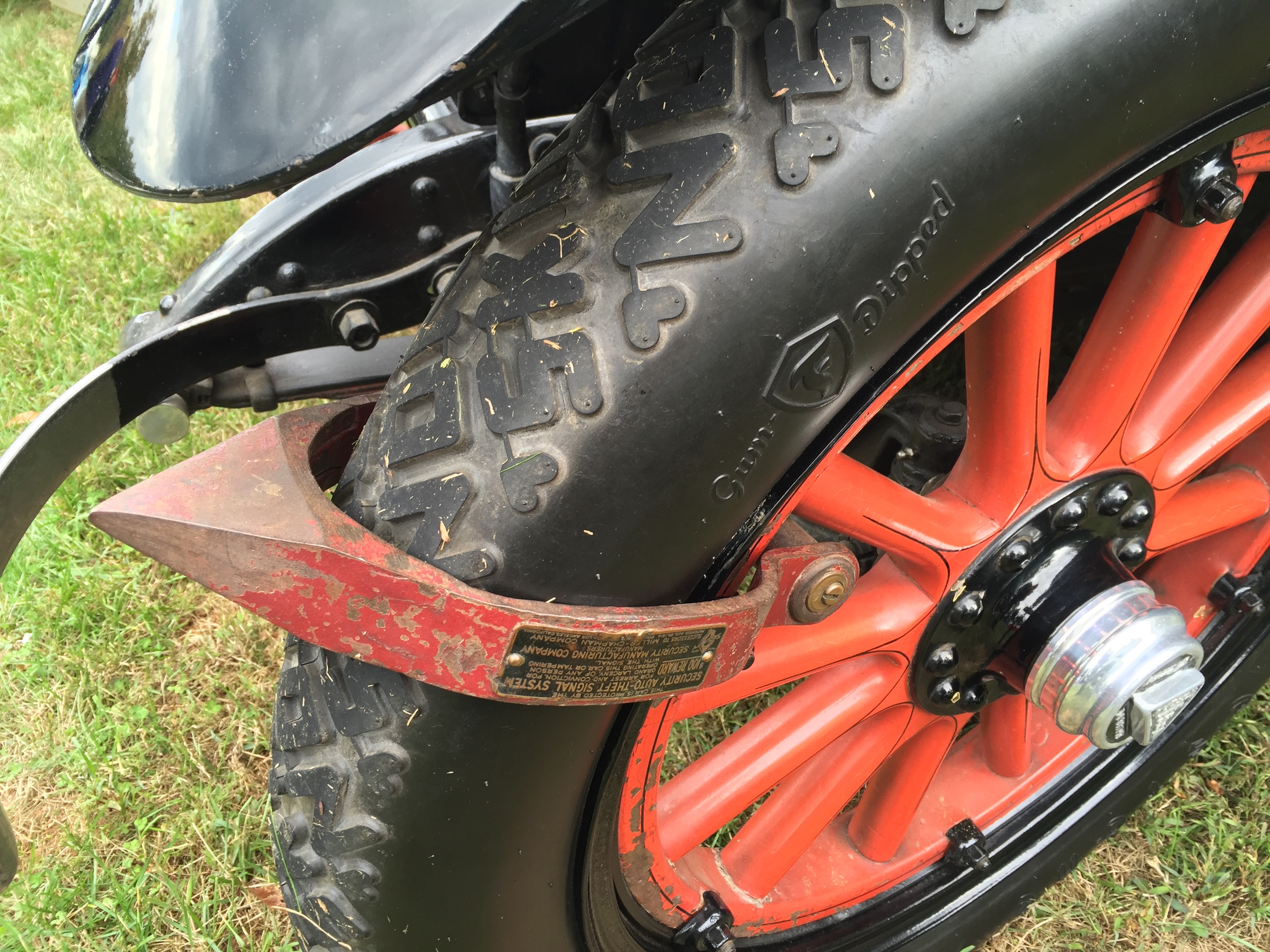
An early wheel clamp device offering a $100 reward for arrest of tamperers, mounted on a 1920 Hudson

As the automobile was introduced and became popular, cars also became a target for thieves and for a new concept that became known as joyriding. A variety of after-market security devices were introduced. An early invention were locking wheel clamps or chocks that owners could shackle onto one of the car's road wheels as a hobble, making it impossible to roll the vehicle unless the entire wheel was removed. Between 1914 and 1925 there were at least 25 patents related to wheel locks that attached on the tire and spoke wheel. These devices were available in many sizes from a number of manufacturers (including several patented by Miller-Chapman), and became popular during the early 1920s.

A version of the modern wheel clamp, originally known as the auto immobiliser, was invented in 1944 and patented in 1958 by Frank Marugg. Marugg was a pattern maker, a violinist with the Denver Symphony Orchestra, and a friend of many Denver politicians and police department officials. The police department needed a solution to a growing parking enforcement problem. The city towed ticketed cars to the pound, where they were often vandalised. Those whose cars were damaged sued the city for losses and the police had to itemize everything in the cars. Dan Stills, head of the city's traffic division, thought an immobilizer would avoid the expensive towing problem and approached Marugg with an idea to improve on the device to keep the cars where they were parked.

The Denver Police Department first used the wheel boot on 5 January 1955 and collected over US$18,000 (US$220,000 in 2025 dollars) in its first month of use. Although the wheel boot was first cast in steel, Marugg soon switched to a lighter aluminum-based alloy. Marugg later sold the device to parking lot owners, hotels and ski resorts, as well as a Jumbo version for farm equipment and larger vehicles. The Smithsonian Institution now has a copy of Marugg's boot on display in Washington, D.C. By 1970 Marugg had sold 2,000 boots. Although the patent ran out in 1976 and modern car and truck wheels necessitated a redesign, Marugg's daughter kept up the business until 1986. Clancy Systems International later bought the rights to the boot. The boot allowed Denver to maintain one of the largest collection rates for parking fines of any city in the US through its first fifty years. The Denver Sheriff ran the "Boot Trucks" for many years until the detail was transferred to Denver Parking Management.

The best known wheel clamp in the UK is the 'London Wheel Clamp'. The designer, Trevor Whitehouse filed the patent in 1991. He originally called the device the 'Preston', after his home town in Lancashire. Primarily used on private land, its notoriety grew once it was introduced to public roads under the Road Traffic Regulations Act of 1991 (commonly known as the de-criminalising of the yellow lines act). The first areas in the country to be decriminalised were the 33 London Boroughs during 1993/94, hence the name change.

== Controversy ==
Wheel-clamping is notoriously unpopular with unauthorised parkers. While a traffic warden or police officer has jurisdiction over public roads, in many countries, the law allows landowners to clamp vehicles parking on their property without permission.

One British man became so annoyed at having his car clamped that he removed the clamp with an angle grinder. He subsequently received publicity as a self-styled "superhero" called "Angle-Grinder Man", offering to remove clamps for free with his angle grinder.

Other motorists have cut the clamps off with bolt cutters or even clamping their own cars beforehand so that property owners will be unable to clamp an already-clamped vehicle and may think that another owner has clamped it. However, the practice of removing clamps is usually only done for those that were installed by private parties; the removal of clamps installed by authorities (chiefly the police) is an offence.

A New Zealand wheel clamper made national headlines in 2013 after he secretly recorded a police officer allegedly threatening to not help if an aggrieved member of the public attacked him. It was not the first time the clamper involved had been in the news.

There was a 2017/18 illegal boot operation around Los Angeles where a scammer booted unsuspecting drivers and demanded a high release fee. People were instructed to call 911 and report the scam if they fell victim. It has since ceased, and the scammer was arrested.

== Legal issues ==
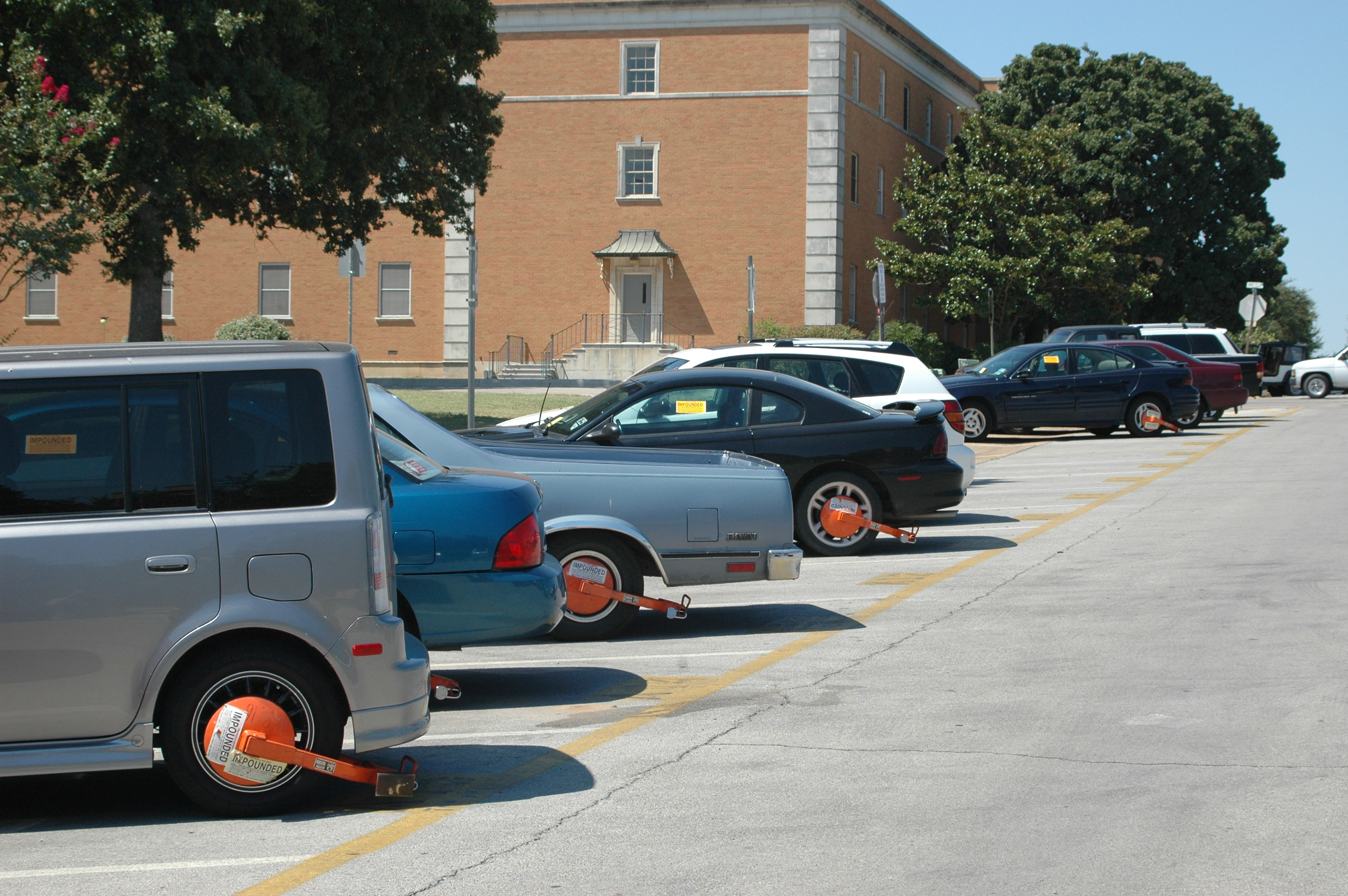
Several vehicles wheel-clamped at University of North Texas, Denton, Texas

=== United Kingdom ===
In Scotland, local authorities are permitted by statute to clamp, tow, or otherwise remove vehicles. Outside that statutory authority, clamping on private land was found to be unlawful in the case Black v Carmichael (1992) SCCR 709, which held that immobilising a vehicle constitutes extortion and theft. Writing in dismissal of parking contractor Alan Black's appeal to the High Court of Justiciary, the Lord Justice General (Lord Hope) cited case law which said "every man has a right to dispute the demand of his creditor in a court of justice" and himself wrote "it is illegal for vehicles to be held to ransom in the manner described in these charges".

In England and Wales, The Protection of Freedoms Act 2012 criminalised certain wheel-clamping activity on private land without lawful authority from 1 October 2012. This prohibits clamping in many common locations such as supermarket car parks, but clamping is not entirely banned. For example, a railway operator may clamp a vehicle under the provisions of Railway Byelaw 14(4). Immobilising a vehicle without lawful authority is itself the offence created by section 54(1) of the Act; a person acting under a separate specific statutory power – such as a local authority enforcing an unpaid penalty charge, the DVLA enforcing vehicle excise duty, or the police – has that lawful authority and does not commit the offence.

A local authority's own power to immobilise a vehicle for an unpaid penalty charge is set out separately, in section 79 of the Traffic Management Act 2004, and its use is graduated by statutory guidance. A vehicle with three or more penalty charge notices that have not been paid, represented against or appealed against within the statutory time limits, or where representations or an appeal have been rejected and the charge remains unpaid, is treated as belonging to a "persistent evader"; such a vehicle may be immobilised or removed after 15 minutes rather than the 30 minutes that otherwise applies, and the guidance directs authorities towards removal to a vehicle pound rather than clamping in the first place. To allow landowners to deal with unauthorised vehicles the same statute allows land owners to hold the registered keeper of a vehicle liable for any charges relating to breach of contract under certain circumstances. Landowners who seek to enforce 'Parking Charge Notices' (contractual payment terms) establish the contract through the use of onsite signage detailing the 'conditions'.

=== Ireland ===
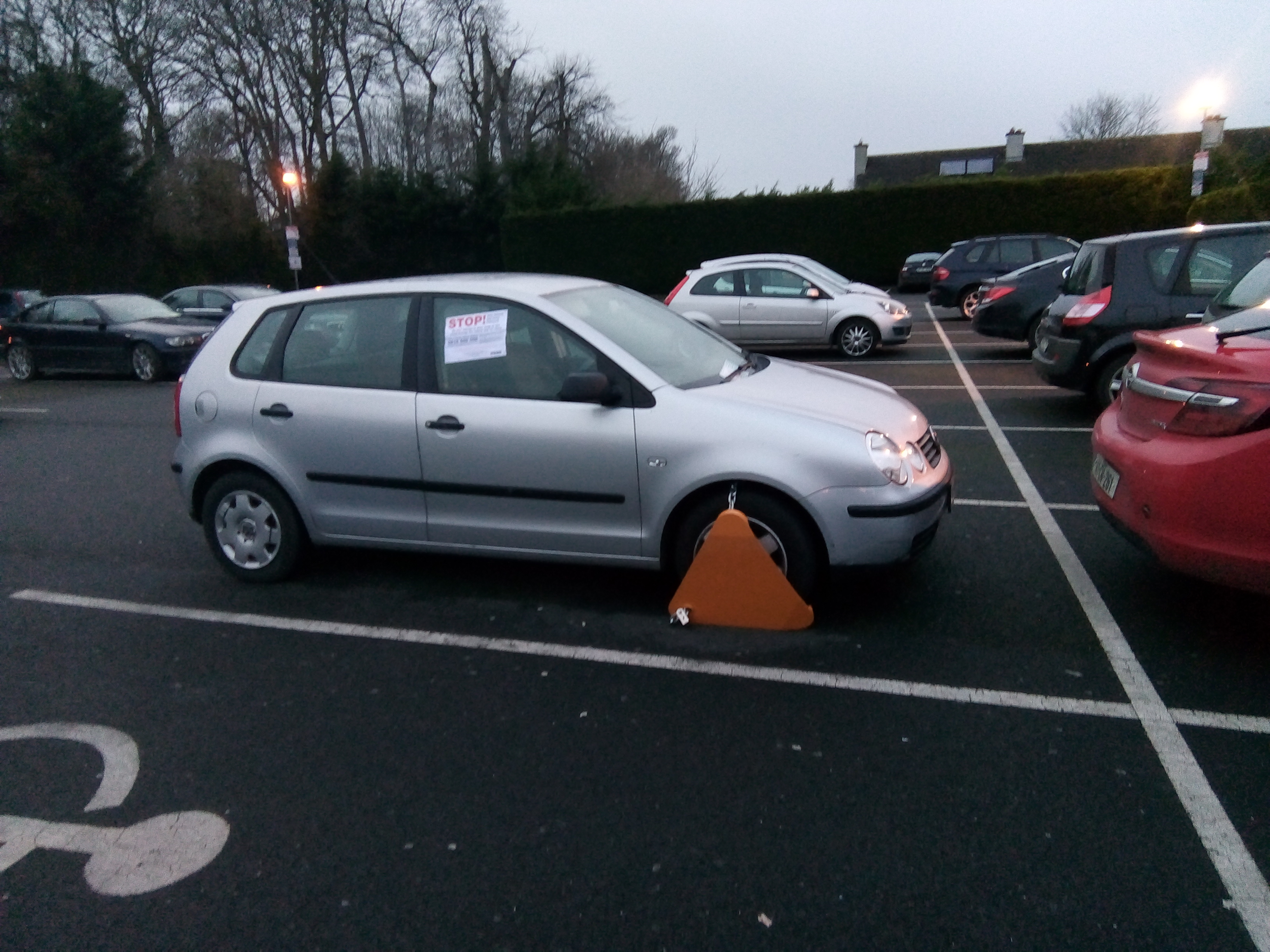
Clamped car (Volkswagen Polo Mk4) in Ireland, with note on driver's side window warning the owner not to attempt to drive away.

In the Republic of Ireland, clamping in public places is legal under a 1988 amendment to the Road Traffic Act 1961. Clamping in private car parks is widespread but not regulated by statute, and the legality of the practice is unclear. The breaches for which an "immobilisation device" may be fitted under the 1961 act are those specified in sections 35, 36, and 36A of the Road Traffic Act 1994 as amended (respectively "Regulations for general control of traffic and pedestrians", "Parking of vehicles in parking places on public roads", and "Bye-laws for restriction on parking – specified events"). Regulations under the 1994 act are made by statutory instrument by the minister responsible for transport (currently the Minister for Transport, Tourism and Sport). Local authorities have delegated the clamping activity to private companies. This contrasts with traffic wardens, who are employees of the authority.

Existing statutory provisions are due to be replaced by the Vehicle Clamping Act 2015, passed as part of the Fine Gael–Labour coalition's 2011 programme for government. The 2015 act regulates private as well as public clamping. It also seeks to improve and standardise the level of fines and the appeals process, which have been the focus of public dissatisfaction.

== See also ==
- Barnacle (parking), a device adhered to a windshield of an illegally parked vehicle
- Bicycle lock
- Predatory towing
