= Consumer Action Group =

The Consumer Action Group (CAG) is a UK forum which provides free help and support on all consumer issues. It is the U.K.'s National Consumer Service

It was founded by Dave Smith and Marc Gander as the Bank Action Group after meeting through Yahoo forum called Bank Charges Hell. The name was later changed to The Consumer Action Group.

In addition to the forums, there is wiki with over 400 articles which aim to act as a bridge between the legalese used by professions and layman's terms used by the majority. Members can calculate interest on any court claims by using their on-line calculator or can download and utilise a variety of spreadsheets. Many of the standard letters that are available on the site can be created automatically, simply by a member completing a small form with basic information.

The Consumer Action Group is funded primarily by donations from members.

Marc Gander, founder of Consumer Action Group, was until 2020 also a key addition to an Advisory Group, set up by Marston (The UK's largest judicial services group) in an attempt to set standards of transparency and ethical practice.
