= Franelero =

Informal valet who guards parked cars for tips

Franeleros are people who have as main activity guarding or keeping an eye on cars parked in several streets in certain places in large Mexican cities, getting a tip as a reward, which sometimes is established by them. The term comes from the Spanish word franela, meaning flannel, which is a small piece of soft light fabric (normally washed out red or gray) which they use to wash the cars if they are asked to, or to simply wave it around to give parking indications. Franeleros are sometimes also known as cuida-coches (car keepers) or "viene vienes" (literally "come come"), which is the phrase they commonly say while giving the parking indications. In 2007, due to the criticisms around this controversial "occupation" (mainly extortion, grand theft auto, relation with organized crime and illegal use of public space), this guarding activity became illegal in Mexico City, but it is still widely practiced. In areas where parking meters have been installed, franeleros no longer operate.

A central tenet of franeleros is the implicit threat that they will intentionally destroy or vandalize cars if the owner does not pay them, making the activity a form of extortion. Franeleros will often block empty spaces with trashcans, empty jugs, flowerpots or bricks, and remove them when their "customers" park.

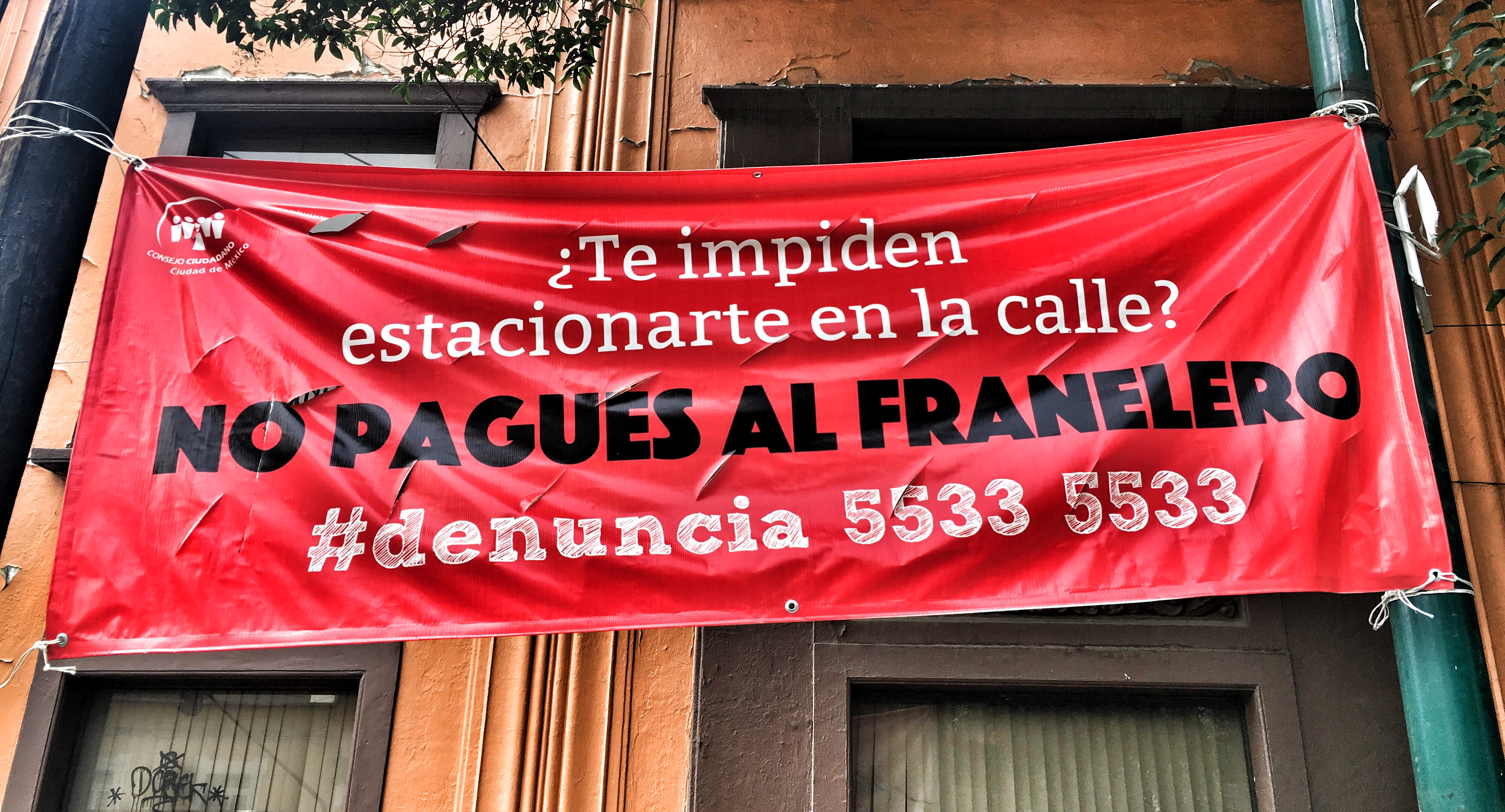
Banner exhorting citizens not to give money to franeleros in Colonia Roma, Mexico City, August 2016

== Location ==
Franeleros are commonly located in big- and medium-size cities, especially in areas with high demand for parking spaces; they may also be present when parking lots have high fares. They are usually found around touristic places (such as Mexico City downtown and Coyoacán), universities and schools, business and office areas (notably Santa Fe and Polanco), shopping malls, nightlife areas, restaurants, banks, markets, supermarkets and commercial zones. Since many of these places in Mexico often have a poor parking infrastructure, limited offer of parking spaces, high fares in parking lots, or simply an unusually high demand for parking spaces, many drivers leave their cars in streets, which attracts franeleros who are eager to earn tips.

== Tipping ==
Although tipping franeleros or not and the amount given should be optional for the driver as it is only a tip (optional by definition), it is often seen that franeleros ask for fixed amounts of money. The tip usually ranges from 2 to 30 Mexican pesos (0.2–3 USD), being this quantity a function of the:

- Area – Franeleros ask for bigger tips in business areas, getting up to 20 MXN (Mexican pesos) per car for the entire day. With people who use their "service" daily, they usually make a weekly arrangement which implies a 10–20% reduction; with this arrangement they sometimes save up a space for their client and they might even serve as valet parking. In touristic places and universities they often ask from 5 to 15 MXN for the while. In medium-demand places such as supermarkets and other commercial zones people tip them with 2 to 5 MXP; these places are of the few to remain really optional to tip. The highest tips are asked around nightlife areas, which normally lack adequate parking spaces; in these places franeleros ask from 15 to 30 MXP. In extremely high-demand situations (concerts and sports events), they may even charge 50 to 100 MXN.
- Space availability – Higher demand implies a higher tip. In some areas where there is continuous and permanent high affluence of cars (like business areas and universities), there are more franeleros and the tips they ask are higher.
- Time spent in the place – Franeleros sometimes ask for their tip according to the time that the car spent on "their" space. If it is really fast, the tip could be small and may even remain optional. For longer periods of time the ask for more. Sometimes they ask the driver how long will he/she delay to say an amount.
- Time of the day – As explained above, franeleros ask for more money during the night, even if it is the same place. Also, at peak hours where there is less availability, they charge more to find a space.
- Car's brand – Franeleros sometimes ask for bigger sums of money if it is an expensive car, inferring that if the driver has a good car, they might also have more money.
- Presence of other franeleros and parking lots – Franeleros sometimes compete among themselves; they reserve certain parking spaces for themselves and charge less or more to generate more income. If there is a parking lot nearby, they usually charge less than its tariff to give an incentive to drivers to leave their car with them.
- Presence of police in the area – As this activity became formally illegal in 2007 in some Mexican cities, sometimes franeleros incur in bribery to be allowed to do their "work". If this is the case, they charge more money so they are able to bribe the police daily and still have some income. This practice has led to corruption in many police organizations.

== See also ==
- Car guard
- Parking in Mexico City
- Trapito
- Valet boy
