= Car guard =

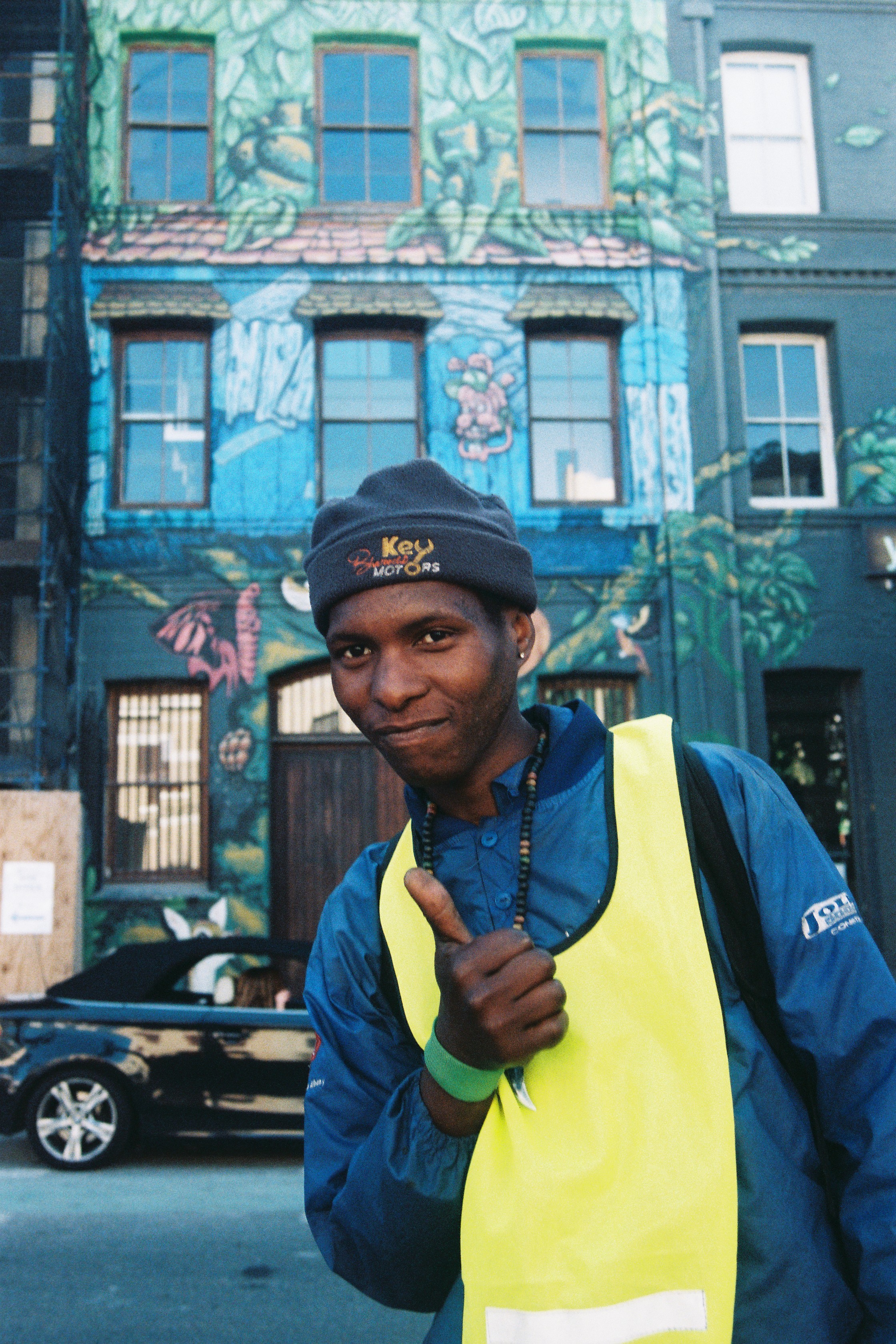
A car guard at work in South Africa

A car guard is an informally employed person in charge of finding parking spots for cars and ensuring the safety of those cars until their owners return. These self-employed individuals often charge a nominal fee. They may euphemistically be called parking attendants or parking assistants.

== Background ==
Car guarding can occur in any area where a lack of formal employment opportunities gives rise to an informal economy. While the process occurs most commonly in South African cities, it is commonplace throughout Southern Africa. Car guards deter crime by raising the probability of detection, deterring potential criminals, and inducing potential criminals to move elsewhere.

== South Africa ==
=== Background ===
South Africa has high unemployment rates and high crime rates, both violent and nonviolent - especially motor theft. Formal unemployment in South Africa is around 35%, and is expected to rise as the number of immigrants into South Africa vastly outweighs the opportunities in the formal sector. Individuals unable to find formal employment turn to car guarding as an alternative source of income. Except for the occasional article in the daily press, very little research has been done on the car guard industry in South Africa, and even less in other countries.

In the late 1990s and early 2000s, self-employed car guards began to expand into sporting events, concerts, and other venues on an ad hoc basis. Several private businesses were set up that hire out vests and equipment to car guards for these events - however, they do not employ or regulate the car guards. Due to the fact that the job requires little overhead cost, this employment opportunity draws many of the 16% of South Africans employed in the informal sector.

=== Demographics ===
The majority of car guards are black or coloured men, with a median age of late twenties to early thirties. Many have been previously employed in the formal sector. However, they earn lower wages on average than low-income jobs in the formal sector (e.g. domestic workers or waiters). Most car guards have not completed secondary education, and find it difficult to find jobs in the formal sector due to a lack of skills or formal education. Studies find that a large proportion of car guards are immigrants from outside of South Africa, who have even more barriers to formal employment than low-income South Africans.

In 2015, a comprehensive study was conducted on 144 car guards in the Pretoria region of South Africa. The survey showed that 63% of the respondents were from outside South Africa while the remaining 37% indicated they were South African citizens. Of those that responded they were from outside South Africa, 63% reported they were from the Democratic Republic of Congo, followed by 19% from Zimbabwe, and 8% from Nigeria.

With respect to education, this recent survey shows, that while it is true that South Africa car guards generally had not continued their education beyond secondary school, immigrant car guards often held tertiary qualifications such as diplomas or degrees.

=== Salary ===
In 2009, there was an amendment to the Basic Conditions of Employment Act that added car guards to the section as it pertained to private security and established a minimum wage in Pretoria and Johannesburg of R2,519 per month. In the 2015 survey referenced above, car guard earnings were also examined. The results showed that approximately 37% of those surveyed earned between R50-100 and 34% reported daily income of between R101-150. This appears to be generally aligned with the mandated minimum wage established in 2009. However, while car guards can potentially earn R4,500/month, there are additional fees that they must pay as "bay-fees" to shopping mall owners, agency fees, if applicable, and uniform rental fees. These additional fees can reduce daily wages below the prescribed minimum wage, or even into a negative daily rate being earned.

=== Issues ===
Because this process is almost completely unregulated, when one parks their car in an area with car guards, they have no guarantee of the guard's reliability. Many South Africans report being threatened by their car guards, or that the guards have often been old or infirm people who would have been unable to provide effective protection. Conversely, people working as car guards have no way of guaranteeing that they will get paid - many guards reporting being promised payment that they never receive. In this transaction, neither customer nor guard has any way of holding the other accountable. While the customer could put themselves at risk, the position is also dangerous for the guard, with some guards reporting receiving threats from car thieves and vagrants. Some car guards report that they prefer to go to "white events" over "black events," saying that they make more money at white events.

=== Future ===
In Cape Town, the car guarding industry is becoming increasingly formalised, with the municipality increasingly employing people to collect money for parking instead of utilizing parking meters. McEwen and Leiman argue that the nature of the industry has changed from "a survival activity of the local homeless and unemployed to one often typified by relatively capable and qualified local and regional migrants."

== Other countries ==
=== Egypt ===
Car guards in Egypt are known as sayes (السايس; singular, plural soyas). Some municipalities of Cairo began to license and regulate sayes in 1980. Roles of Egyptian car guards vary from informal parking valets who actually park the car on the owner's behalf, to simply watching the car to prevent vandalism. Because of their knowledge of the street, sayes are often used by the police as informers. The sayes role has often provided a lifeline for unemployed Egyptians.

In 2018, the Parliament of Egypt enacted legislation to license and regulate the sayes profession nationwide. The law provides for a maximum fee that a sayes may charge, to be set by the Ministry of Local Development, and imposes fines for violations. The law was part of a broader campaign to formalize Egypt's vast informal economy. Additional legislation to further regulate parking practices, with the potential to eliminate the sayes profession entirely, was proposed in 2020.

=== Mozambique ===
In Mozambique, car guards work in groups to prevent thieves from stealing items such as mirrors from parked vehicles. Each group is run by a chefe, or boss, who divides parking areas into zones and assigns guards to each zone. The chefe also serves as a liaison between the guards and the police.

=== Namibia ===
In Namibia, car guards that work in semi-private parking areas, such as malls or shopping centers, must actually pay the shopping center to work there. Consumer tipping of car guards is also not compulsory, minimizing the profits earned by the car guards themselves.

== See also ==
- Traffic police
- Traffic warden
- Traffic guard
- Bylaw enforcement officer
- Franelero
- Trapito
- Valet boy
