= Valet =

Personal attendant

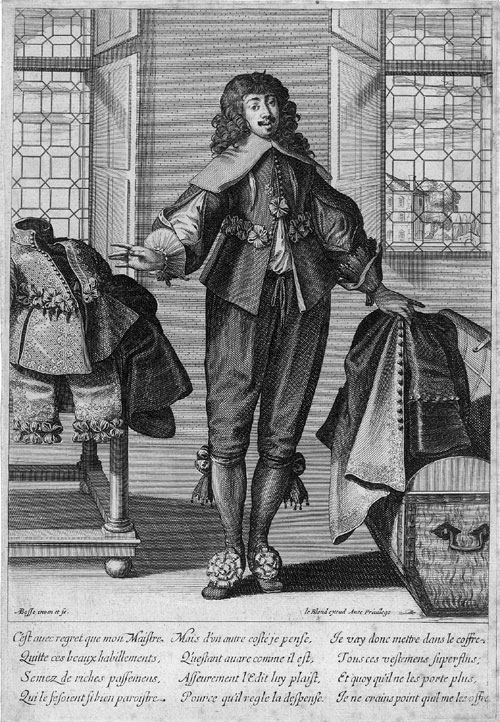
A 17th-century valet de chambre

A valet or varlet is a male servant who serves as personal attendant to his employer. In the Middle Ages and Ancien Régime, valet de chambre was a role for junior courtiers and specialists such as artists in a royal court, but the term "valet" by itself most often refers to a normal servant responsible for the clothes and personal belongings of an employer, and making minor arrangements. In the United States, the term most often refers to a parking valet, and the role is often confused with a butler.

== Word origins ==
In English, valet as "personal man-servant" is recorded since 1567, though use of the term in the French-speaking English medieval court is older, and the variant form varlet is cited from 1456 (OED). Both are French importations of valet or varlet (the "t" being silent in modern French), Old French variants of vaslet "man's servant", originally "squire, young man", assumed to be from Gallo-Romance Vulgar Latin *vassellittus "young nobleman, squire, page", diminutive of Medieval Latin vassallus, from vassus "servant", possibly cognate to an Old Celtic root wasso- "young man, squire" (source of Welsh gwas "youth, servant", Breton goaz "servant, vassal, man", Irish foss "servant"). See yeoman, possibly derived from yonge man, a related term.

The modern use is usually short for the valet de chambre (French for "room valet", in modern terms the bedroom, though not originally so), described in the following section.

Since the 16th century, the word has traditionally been pronounced as rhyming with pallet, though an alternative pronunciation, rhyming with array and allay, as in French, is now common, particularly in the United States. The Oxford English Dictionary lists both pronunciations.

== Domestic valet ==
A valet or "gentleman's gentleman" is a gentleman's male servant; the closest female equivalent is a lady's maid. The valet performs personal services such as maintaining his employer's clothes, running his bath and perhaps (especially in the past) shaving his employer.

In a great house, the master of the house had his own valet, and in the very grandest great houses, other adult members of the employing family (e.g. master's sons) would also have their own valets.

At a court, even minor princes and high officials may be assigned one, but in a smaller household the butler – the majordomo in charge of the household staff – might have to double as his employer's valet. In a bachelor's household the valet might perform light housekeeping duties as well.

Valets learned the skills for their role in various ways. Some began as footmen, learning some relevant skills as part of that job, and picking up others when deputising for their master's valet, or by performing valeting tasks for his sons before they had a valet of their own, or for male guests who did not travel with a valet. Others started out as soldier-servants to army officers (batmen) or stewards to naval officers.

Traditionally, a valet did much more than merely lay out clothes and take care of personal items. He was also responsible for making travel arrangements, dealing with any bills and handling all money matters concerning his master or his master's household.

Alexandre Bontemps, the most senior of the thirty-six valets to Louis XIV of France, was a powerful figure, who ran the Château de Versailles. In courts, valet de chambre was a position of some status, often given to artists, musicians, poets and others, who generally spent most of their time on their specialized work. The role was also, at least during the late Middle Ages and the Renaissance, a common first step or training period in a nobleman's career at court.

Valets, like butlers and most specialized domestic staff, have become relatively rare. A more common, though still infrequent, arrangement is the general servant performing combined roles.

A notable 20th century domestic valet was Sydney Johnson who served as personal valet to the Duke of Windsor and later to the businessman Mohamed Al-Fayed.

Another notable person is Walt Nauta, a former military valet, who worked at the White House and later at Mar-a-Lago as Donald Trump's personal valet.

=== Famous fictional valets ===
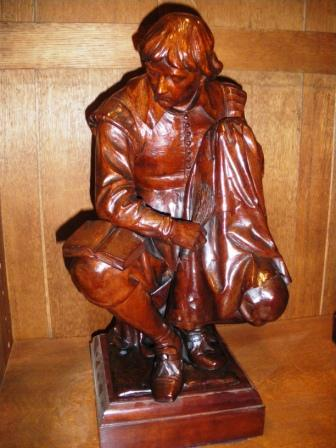
Carving of "Bazin", the valet to Aramis, of The Three Musketeers, was a studious person who later became a lay brother. (Thomas Nicholls carves him brushing his master's clothes whilst studying theology.)

- Albert, valet to the incarnation of Death in the Discworld series.
- Baptistin, in The Count of Monte Cristo (1844) by Alexandre Dumas
- Hugo Barrett, in the 1948 Robin Maugham novella, 1958 play and 1963 Joseph Losey film The Servant
- John Bates (Brendan Coyle), in the Julian Fellowes period drama Downton Abbey (2010–2015)
- Mervyn Bunter, created in 1923 by Dorothy L. Sayers in the Lord Peter Wimsey series
- Figaro, the Count of Almaviva's valet from Beaumarchais' play The Marriage of Figaro (1786), as well as the Mozart and Rossini operas based on it
- Giles French (Sebastian Cabot) in the sitcom Family Affair (1966–1971)
- George (or Georges), created by Agatha Christie in 1926, in the Hercule Poirot novels
- Hobson (Sir John Gielgud), from the 1981 comedy film Arthur
- Jeeves, created in 1915 by P. G. Wodehouse, starred in a series of stories until Wodehouse's death in 1975
- Rochester van Jones (Eddie Anderson), the valet of Jack Benny on Benny's radio and television shows, introduced in 1937
- Kato, Inspector Clouseau's valet and martial arts partner in the Pink Panther movies, introduced in A Shot in the Dark (1964)
- Kato, fictional sidekick/valet of The Green Hornet, created in 1936
- Leporello, valet of Don Giovanni in the 1787 opera by Mozart
- Edward Henry Masterman, the victim's valet and a suspect in Agatha Christie's Murder on the Orient Express (1934)
- Passepartout, in the 1873 novel Around the World in Eighty Days by Jules Verne
- Planchet, valet to D'Artagnan of The Three Musketeers (1844)
- Pork, Gerald O'Hara's valet in the 1936 novel Gone With the Wind
- Smerdyakov, the valet to Fyodor Pavlovitch in The Brothers Karamazov (1879) by Fyodor Dostoyevsky
- Sisk, created in Harry Segall's 1938 play, Heaven Can Wait, which was adapted into a 1941 film, Here Comes Mr. Jordan, and other films
- "Spicer" Lovejoy (David Warner), millionaire Caledon Hockley's (Billy Zane) English valet in the 1997 film Titanic
- The character "Valet" from No Exit (1944) by Jean-Paul Sartre
- Sam Weller, valet to Samuel Pickwick in The Pickwick Papers (1836) by Charles Dickens

== Other valets ==
Valet is also used for people performing specific services:

- hotel valet: an employee who performs personal services for guests.
- parking valet: a service employee who parks cars for guests, only from 1960.
- car valet: an employee who is paid to clean people's cars professionally.
- valet: a professional wrestling term for a person who accompanies a wrestler to the ring.
- jockey's valet: an employee who maintains a jockey's wardrobe and ensures the proper uniform is worn for each horse the jockey races.

Other forms of valet-like personnel include:

- Batman
- Bedder
- Dresser

=== Clothes valet ===
Clothes valets are a piece of furniture also referred to as a men's valet. A majority are free standing and made out of wood.

== Varlet ==
While in French this word remained restricted to the feudal use for a (knight's) squire, in modern English it came to be used for the various other male servants originally called va(r)let other than the gentleman's gentleman, when in livery usually called lackey, such as the valet de pied ('foot varlet', compare footman). In archaic English, varlet also could mean an unprincipled man; a rogue.

== See also ==
- Chauffeur
- Footman
- Housekeeper
- Jack
- Maid
- Majordomo
- Personal assistant
- Valet boy
