= Trapito =

Trapito is the Argentinian term for an extortionist who runs a protection racket in which they ostensibly guard parked cars, while actually vandalizing or stealing the cars of those who refuse to pay.

== Description ==
Trapitos ask for a substantial "tip" for guarding cars that motorists park on the street. The name trapito comes from the Spanish word for a small piece of cloth or rag, which the trapitos use for identification. If a driver refuses to pay the trapito will vandalize or steal the car. The amount of money is arbitrarily set by the trapito, not by the person who parks the car. The charge starts around $40 and can rise to $250 in locations near popular nightspots, attractions or events.

The NGO "Defendamos Buenos Aires" estimates that there are nearly 1,000 trapitos in Buenos Aires. Their activities are linked to the barra brava groups of football fans.

== Regulation ==
Article 79 of the Argentine Contraventional Code allows the request of tips, unless it involves extortion. This provision makes the law unenforceable, as it is almost impossible to prove a threat was made. Police would have to witness the trapito at the moment of the extortion, and the legal system must have proof of such extortion. There were 3,191 complaints in 2013, but 95% were dismissed for lack of evidence, and none went to trial. As the trapitos do not work in private parking lots their activity contravenes the rules for public spaces, for which only the state has rights to set limits on or charge for its usage.

In the legislature of Buenos Aires, the Republican Proposal (PRO, aligned with mayor Mauricio Macri) and the Front for Victory (FPV, aligned with president Cristina Fernández de Kirchner) have opposing views on the issue. The PRO wants to ban the activity completely, but has been unable to secure the votes needed to enact the proposed bill. The FPV wants instead to regulate cuidacoches (car guards) and proposed a law for this purpose, which was vetoed by Macri.

== See also ==
- Car guard
- Valet boy
- Franelero
