= Parking in Mexico City =

Street parking

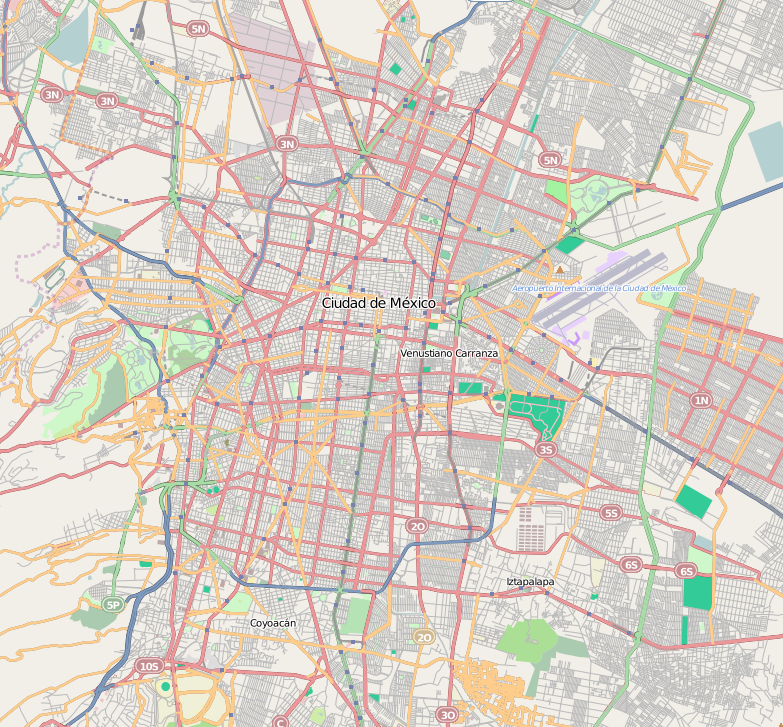
Colonias with parking meters (late 2013)

Parking in Mexico City is a mix of street parking controlled by franeleros or parking space holders, but in some areas meters have been introduced. According to a survey by IBM, Mexico City had North America's worst parking and tied for 10th worst in the world, to IBM's survey, with 73 per cent of drivers in Mexico City having had to abandon their search for parking at some point during the previous 12 months.

== Franeleros ==
Street parking in urban neighborhoods is mostly controlled by the franeleros (from franela, the red rag they wave to gain the attention of drivers), a.k.a. "viene vienes" (lit. "come on, come on"), who ask drivers for a fee to park; in the Condesa neighborhood in 2012, 20 to 40 pesos (USD 1.52 to 3.04). The requested fee can be as high as 200 to 300 pesos (USD 9.87 to 14.8), for example during sports events in the area surrounding the Plaza México bullring (the world's largest) and the Estadio Azul soccer stadium.

The fee is in theory a tip to guard the car, but is in fact extortion, since there is the implicit threat that the franelero will damage the car if the fee is not paid. Double parking is common (with franeleros moving the cars as required), impeding on the available lanes for traffic to pass.

As of October 2013, there are almost daily reports about franeleros, whether about local authorities trying to expel them, or franeleros refusing to leave such areas, or franeleros breaking parking meters.

== Metered parking ==
In order to mitigate that and other problems and to raise revenue, 721 parking meters (as of October 2013), in Spanish parquimetros, have been installed in the west-central neighborhoods Lomas de Chapultepec, Condesa, Roma, Cuauhtémoc, Juárez (including the Zona Rosa), Polanco and Anzures, in operation from 8 AM to 8 PM on weekdays and charging a rate of 2 pesos (USD 0.1) per 15 minutes, with offenders' cars booted, costing about 500 pesos (USD 25) to remove. 30% of the 16 million peso (USD 789344) per month (as of October 2013) parking meter income from the system (named "ecoParq") is earmarked for neighborhood improvements. The granting of the license for all zones exclusively to a new company without experience in operating parking meters, Operadora de Estacionamientos Bicentenario, has generated controversy.

=== Expansion plans ===
As of November 2013 there are plans to expand metered parking to Álvaro Obregón borough (colonias Guadalupe Inn, Florida, Crédito Constructor, Axotla and Agrícola) and Coyoacán borough (colonias Del Carmen, Barrio de Santa Catarina, Villa Coyoacán, Barrio de La Purísima Concepción and Barrio San Lucas), as well as colonias Escandón and San Miguel Chapultepec.

== Valet parking ==
As of October 2013, the same west-central neighborhoods are plagued by rogue valet parking services in front of hundreds of restaurants, bars and shops. Laws are being proposed to control valet parking services and require them to belong to a registered entity (razón social), present their rates, and the location where the car will be parked. It would require valets to own or rent spaces for the cars off street.
