= List of tipping customs by country =

Local customs concerning tipping, the giving of a gratuity, vary around the world.

== Asia ==
=== China ===
In China, traditionally there is no tipping. However, hotels that routinely serve foreign tourists allow tipping, as do tour guides and associated drivers.

During the Mao Zedong era, service workers (fuwuyuan 服务员) refused tips on the grounds that tipping implied a servile relationship (and was thus insulting) and ran contrary to the prevailing Chinese views of social and economic democracy.

In cities bordering Hong Kong like Shenzhen, some restaurants and hotels also started to charge gratuity since the 1980s.

=== Japan ===
As a service charge is typically included as part of bills at hotels and restaurants, tipping is generally not practiced in Japan. In addition, Japan has a set of traditions and customs regarding giving money as a gift, so tipping may cause confusion or be considered rude if the money is given without being placed in a special gift envelope first. Like many other countries in East Asia, Japanese people see tipping as insulting. The Tip Project was a 2021 plan to normalise tipping in Japan in 2021.

=== India ===
In India, tipping is not normal in hotels and restaurants, but may be appreciated. Tips can be rounding off the bill or 5%-10% of the bill. However, it is gaining popularity and the food delivery apps often nudge the customers to tip the delivery partners.

=== Iran ===
Tipping is not expected for occupations mostly.

=== Malaysia ===
In Malaysia, tipping is not the norm and is not expected for any service. Instead restaurants can add a service charge of 10% to the bill.

=== Pakistan ===
Tipping is not an obligation, and it is not considered rude not to tip, though workers will be pleased if tipped. Normally in low to medium-end restaurants, the bill is rounded up to the nearest Rs.100 or 1,000 and the change is given as tip either directly to the waiter or left on the table.

In more formal settings, hotels and restaurants add a 10% service charge to the bill, which is paid along with the bill itself.

=== South Korea ===
Tipping is not customary in Korean culture, and tipping is not expected in the general service industry. High-end hotels and restaurants often include a service charge of between 10% and 15%. It is always included in the bill and customers are not expected to leave an additional gratuity for servers.

=== United Arab Emirates ===
Tipping in the United Arab Emirates is optional, but it is common in restaurants, hotels, and other tourist-facing services. Some restaurants and hotels include a service charge in the bill, especially in higher-end venues. Customers may still leave a small extra tip for good service, and taxi fares are sometimes rounded up.

== Europe ==
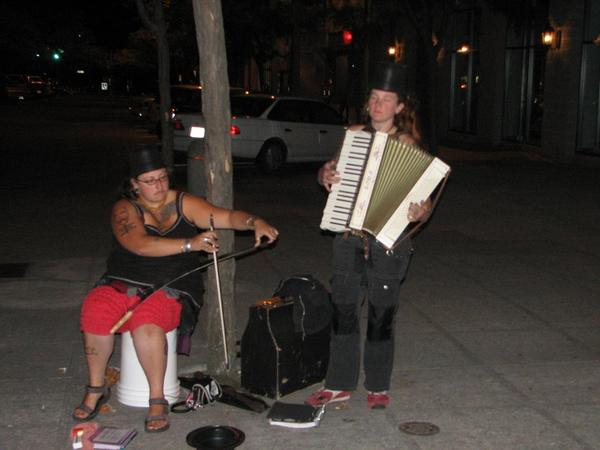
Buskers often punctuate their performances with requests for tips.

=== Albania ===
Tipping (bakshish) in Albania is very much expected almost everywhere. In recent times it has become more common, as many foreigners and Albanians living abroad visit Albania. Leaving a tip of around 10% of the bill is customary in restaurants; even porters, guides and chauffeurs expect tips. Duty-free alcohol is often used as a type of tip for porters, bellhops and the like, though some people (such as Muslims) can find it offensive.

=== Austria ===
Tipping is not required but often expected, particularly in restaurants where roughly 5% to 10% is common. This depends on the service one received and the restaurant level (low, medium, high prices). In standard restaurants it is acceptable to round up to the next euro. Another common setting where tipping is customary is taxis, where bills may be rounded up to the next euro.

=== Czech Republic ===
Tipping (spropitné, informally dýško or tuzér) in the Czech Republic, like in Germany and Austria, is optional but polite and very welcome, especially in restaurants, and less often in taxis, hairdressers and similar services. The usual practice is for the customer to round the price to the nearest higher "nice number" so as not to have to handle small coins, and to tell the waiter what amount to round the price to. The resulting tip tends to be around 10%, but this is not a hard and fast rule. So, for example, if the waiter says the price is 279 CZK, the customer pays with a 500 CZK note and says: "Three hundred crowns." This means that the waiter should return only 200 CZK and keep 21 CZK as a tip. When paying by card, the tip can either be added to the payment or given separately in cash. If the waiter does not have to return anything after rounding up (e.g. if the price is 174 CZK and the customer pays with a 200 CZK note), it is customary to say "To je v pořádku" ("Keep the change", literally "That's alright"). A tip of more than 10-15% is more likely to be given in recognition of outstanding service. On the other hand, especially in the case of dissatisfaction with the service, it is perfectly acceptable not to tip at all. It is not customary to leave a tip on the table. According to Czech law, service charge must always be included in the listed price (but tips do not appear in the bill). Some Prague restaurants have been reported to display "Service is not included" signs to persuade foreign tourists to pay more, mimicking the practice in the United States. However, this is a scam.

=== Denmark ===
Tips (drikkepenge, lit. "drinking money") are not required in Denmark since service charges must always be included in the bill by law. Tipping for outstanding service is a matter of choice, but is not expected.

=== France ===
Tips (pourboires, lit. "for drinking") in France are neither required nor expected, and should only be offered after the customer received outstanding service. Waiters are paid a living wage and do not depend on tips, and cafés and restaurants are required by law to include a service charge (usually 15%) in the menu price; it is not usually set out separately on the bill. Tipping is better received in venues accustomed to tourists, but can be treated with disdain in smaller food establishments and those in more rural areas. Should one decide to tip after experiencing excellent service, it is customary to round up to the next Euro for small bills, and up to 5% for larger ones. Anything over 5% is considered very generous. For superior service in higher-end eating establishments, a more generous (10% or more) tip would not be out of place.

=== Germany ===
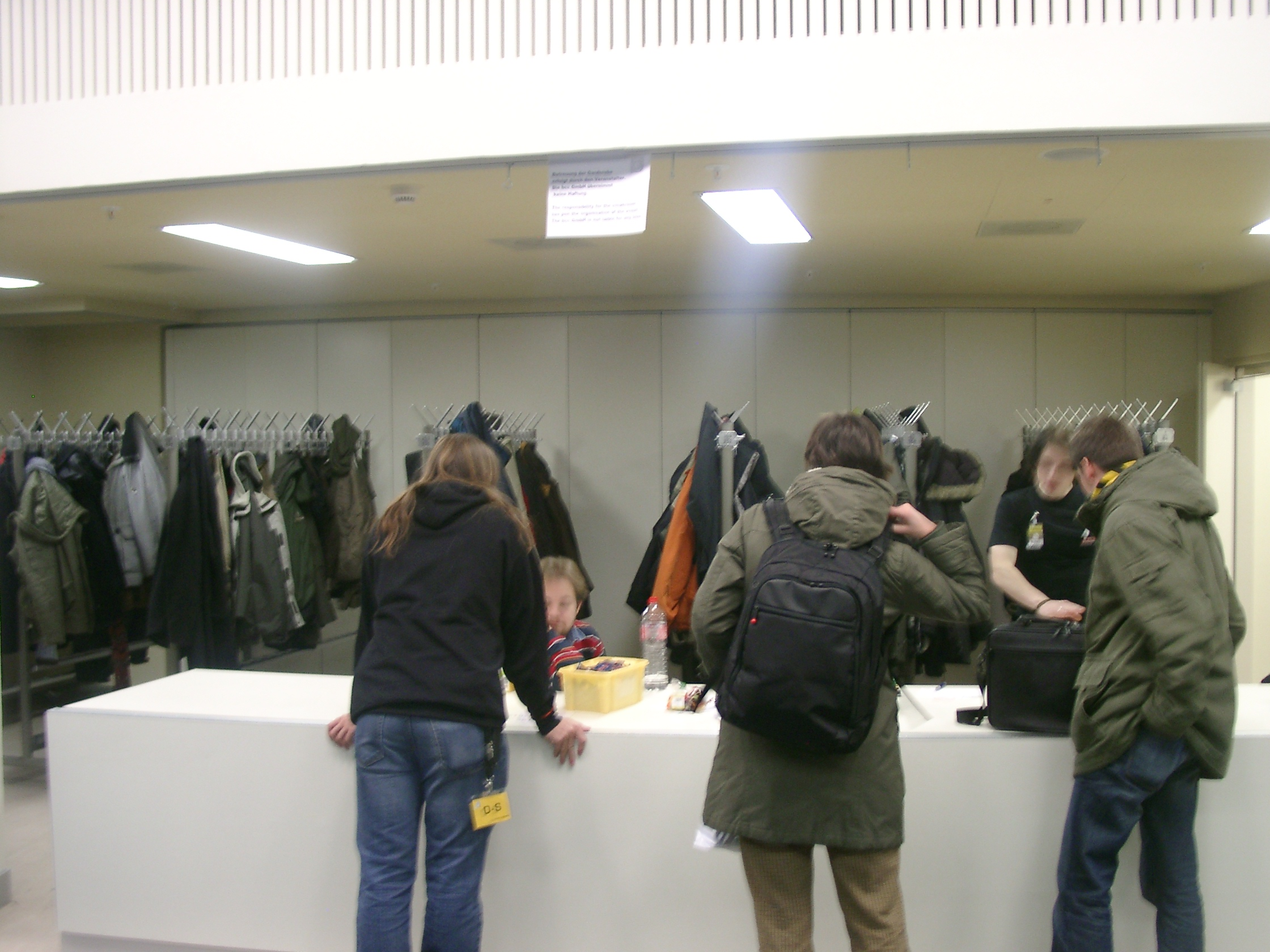
Coat check staff are usually tipped for their service and this photo shows a coat-check area at the Berliner Congress Centrum (BCC) in Alexanderplatz, Berlin, Germany.

At times, rather than tipping individually, a tipping box is set up. Rounding up the bill in Germany is commonplace, sometimes with the comment stimmt so ("keep the change").

Sometimes a sign reading Aufrunden bitte ("round up please") is found in places where tipping is not common (like supermarkets, or clothing retailers). This requests that the bill be rounded up to the nearest €0.10. This is not to tip the staff, but a charity donation (fighting child poverty), and completely voluntary.

In Germany, tips are considered as income, but they are tax free according to § 3 Nr. 51 of the German Income Tax Law.

=== Hungary ===
The Hungarian word for tip is borravaló (literally "intended for wine", a loose calque from German: Trinkgeld) or colloquially baksis (from Persian: بخشش bakhshesh), often written in English as backsheesh. Tipping is widespread in Hungary; the degree of expectation and the expected amount varies with price, type and quality of service, and also influenced by the satisfaction of the customer.

=== Iceland ===
In Iceland, tipping (þjórfé, lit. "serving money") is not customary and never expected. Foreign tourists sometimes still tip without thinking because that is the custom in their home country. Tourist guides in Iceland also sometimes encourage their guests to tip them, but there is no requirement to do so.

=== Ireland ===
Some people may choose to tip in restaurants and for food deliveries. When paying by cash, this is often to offload coins or avoid receiving them by allowing the change to be kept as the tip. Hairdressers or similar services may be tipped for a good job, most commonly by repeat customers, usually up to 5 euro as cash, even when paying for the service electronically.

Tips and service charges, whether mandatory or not, collected electronically such as by credit card payment must be distributed in full to staff. Tips distributed this way are to be treated as pay and tax deducted in the usual way, while cash tips must be declared by staff via a tax return.

=== Italy ===
Tips (la mancia) are not customary in Italy, and are given only for a special service or as thanks for high quality service, but they are very uncommon. Almost all restaurants (with the notable exception of those in Rome) have a service charge (called coperto or servizio). As restaurants are required to inform customers of any fees they charge, they usually list the coperto/servizio on the menu.

=== Norway ===
It is uncommon for Norwegians to tip taxi drivers or cleaning staff at hotels. In restaurants and bars it is more common, but not expected. Tips are often given to reward high quality service or as a kind gesture. Tipping is most often done by leaving small change (5–15%) at the table or rounding up the bill.

Oslo Servitørforbund and Hotell- og Restaurantarbeiderforbundet (The Labor Union for Hotel and Restaurant Employees) has said many times that they discourage tipping, except for extraordinary service, because it makes salaries decrease over time, makes it harder to negotiate salaries and does not count towards pensions, unemployment insurance, loans and other benefits.

=== Romania ===
A coin handling aversion has resulted in the widespread practice of rounding payments. This is not technically a tip, and as such is not aimed primarily at the individual at the counter, but rather at the business.

=== Russia ===
Tipping, or чаевые (lit. "for tea"), is optional and usually not expected, especially in budget cafes. The common custom is to leave about 10% of the total bill for good service as a sign of appreciation.

=== Slovenia ===
Tipping is common in Slovenia, but most locals do not tip other than to round up to the nearest euro. Absence of a tip is generally interpreted as dissatisfaction with the food or service. Since about 2007, areas visited by many tourists have begun to accept tips of around 10–20%.

=== Spain ===
Tipping (propina or bote; literally "can, jar" after the tipping jar) is not generally considered mandatory in Spain, and depends on the quality of the service received. In restaurants the amount of the tip, if any, depends mainly on the kind of locale: higher percentages are expected in upscale restaurants. In bars and small restaurants, Spaniards sometimes leave as a tip the small change left on their plate after paying a bill. Outside the restaurant business, some service providers, such as taxi drivers, hairdressers and hotel personnel, may expect a tip in an upscale setting. In 2007 the Minister of Economy, Pedro Solbes, blamed excessive tipping for the increase in the inflation rate.

=== Sweden ===
Tipping (dricks) is commonly not expected, but is practiced to reward high quality service or as a kind gesture. Tipping is most often done by leaving small change on the table or rounding up the bill. This is mostly done at restaurants (less often if payment is made at the desk) and in taxis (some taxis are very expensive as there is no fixed tariff, so they might not be tipped). Less often hairdressers are tipped.

=== Turkey ===
In Turkey, tipping, or bahşiş (lit. gift, from the Persian word بخشش, often rendered in English as "baksheesh") is usually optional and not customary in many places. Though not necessary, a tip of 5–10% is appreciated in restaurants, and is usually paid by "leaving the change". Cab drivers usually do not expect to be tipped, though passengers may round up the fare. A tip of small change may be given to a hotel porter. However, many customers started to tip generously ever since the pandemic in order to help, especially local, establishments.

=== Ukraine ===
In Ukraine, tips (чайові, chayovi — literally an adjective derived from "tea") usually range from 5% to 15%, the most common amount is 10%.

=== United Kingdom ===
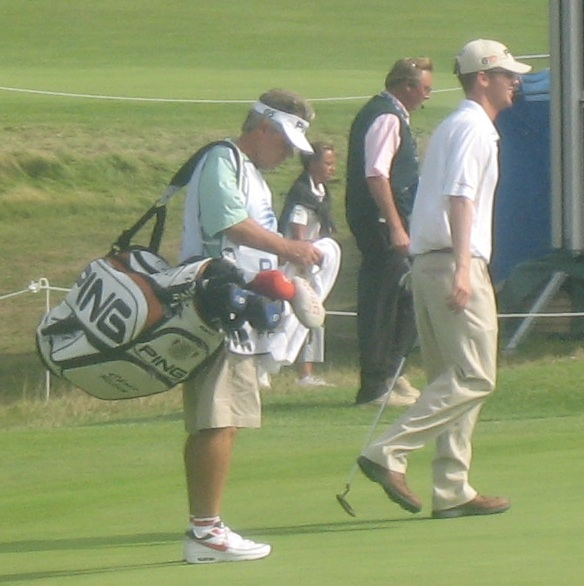
Golfers often tip the caddies who carry their golf clubs.

Tipping is not expected in Britain the way it is in some other countries; however, for the majority of people tipping in some circumstances is customary as a sign of appreciation. As all staff in the UK must be paid at least the National Minimum Wage, companies that accept tips are not allowed to use tips as a means to reduce wages below the minimum wage. The minimum wage varies by age: as of 2026, it is £12.71 for those aged 21 and over, £8.60 for those aged 18 to 20 and £6.40 for those under 18.

Employers are also banned from topping up wages with tips from customers.

Sometimes, more often in London than in other areas, or at expensive restaurants, a service charge may be included in the bill, or added separately. 12.5% is reported as a common amount. Since it is a legal requirement to include all taxes and other obligatory charges in the prices displayed, a service charge is compulsory only if it is displayed, or the trader makes it clear verbally, before the meal. Even so, if the level of service is unacceptable, and in particular it falls short of the requirements of the Supply of Goods and Services Act 1982, the customer can refuse to pay some or all of a service charge.

== North America and the Caribbean ==
=== Canada ===
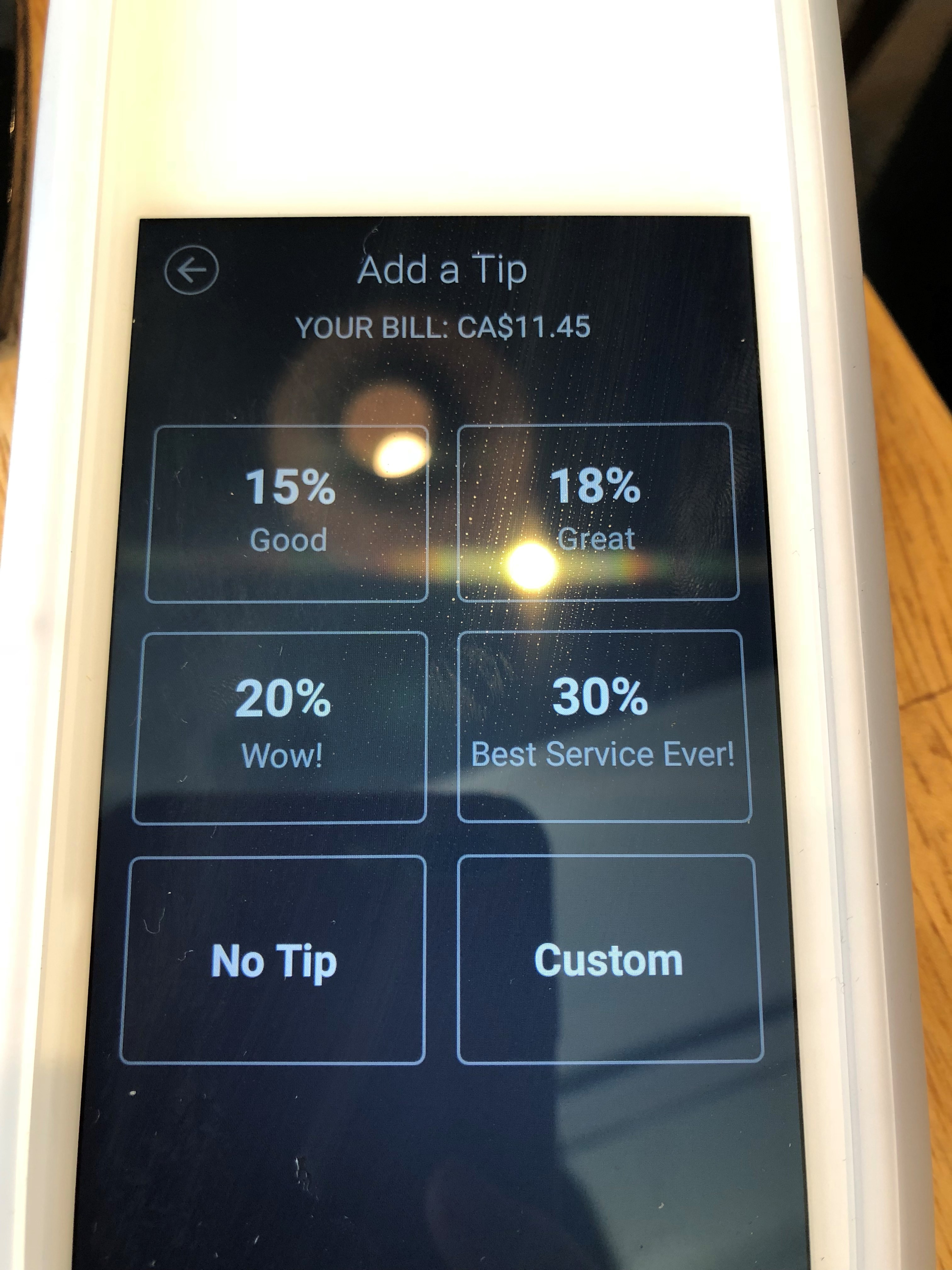
Tipping options on a chip card reader

Tipping is practiced in Canada in a similar, but often less vigorous manner than the United States. Though a 15-18% gratuity is fairly common when food is served, tipping is not otherwise as widespread as in American culture. Hospitality service workers in American border cities, where Canadian tourists are common, note that they receive smaller tips from them.

In Canadian provinces other than Quebec, a deeply entrenched practice is "tipping out", in which servers' tips are shared with kitchen staff. Another custom in some restaurants is "house tipping", in which the manager or owner takes a share of the tips, a practice that is permitted in some provinces and forbidden in others.

Canadian federal tax law considers tips as income. Workers who receive tips are legally required to report the income to the Canada Revenue Agency and pay income tax on it. In July 2012, The Toronto Star reported that CRA is concerned with tax evasion. An auditing of 145 servers in four restaurants by CRA mentioned in the report uncovered that among 145 staff audited, C$1.7 million was unreported. In 2005, The CRA was quoted that it will closely check the tax returns of individuals who would reasonably be expected to be receiving tips to ensure that the tips are reported realistically.

=== Caribbean ===
Tipping in the Caribbean varies from island to island. In the Dominican Republic, restaurants add a 10% gratuity and it is customary to tip an extra 10%. In St. Barths, it is expected that a tip be 10% to 15% if gratuity is not already included.

=== Mexico ===
Workers in small, economy restaurants usually do not expect a tip. However, tipping in Mexico is common in larger, medium and higher end restaurants. It is customary in these establishments to tip not less than 10% but not more than 15% of the bill as a voluntary offering for good service based on the total bill before value added tax, "IVA" in English, VAT. Value added tax is already included in menu or other service industry pricing since Mexican Consumer Law requires the exhibition of final costs for the customer. Thus, the standard tip in Mexico is 11.5% of the pre-tax bill which equates to 10% after tax in most of the Mexican territory, except in special lower tax stimulus economic zones.

Tips to taxi drivers are unusual in Mexico, but drivers used to ask for them from tourists, knowing that is common in other countries. Locally, taxi drivers are only tipped when they offer an extra service, like helping with the luggage or similar help.

A gratuity may be added to the bill without the customer's consent, contrary to the law, either explicitly printed on the bill, or by more surreptitious means alleging local custom, in some restaurants, bars, and night clubs. However, in 2012, officials began a campaign to eradicate this increasingly rampant and abusive practice not only due to it violating Mexican consumer law, but also because frequently it was retained by owners or management.

If a service charge for tip ("propina" or "restaurant service charge") is added, it is a violation of Article 10 of the Mexican Federal Law of the Consumer and Mexican authorities recommend patrons require management to refund or deduct this from their bill. Additionally, in this 2012 Federal initiative to eliminate the illegal add-ons, the government clarified that contrary even to the belief of many Mexicans, that the Mexican legal definition of tips ("propinas") require it be discretionary to pay so that an unsatisfied client is under no obligation to pay anything to insure the legal definition of a tip is consistent with the traditional, cultural definition, and going as far to encourage all victims subject to the increasing illicit practice report the establishments to the PROFECO, the Office of the Federal Prosecutor for the Consumer, for prosecution.

=== United States ===
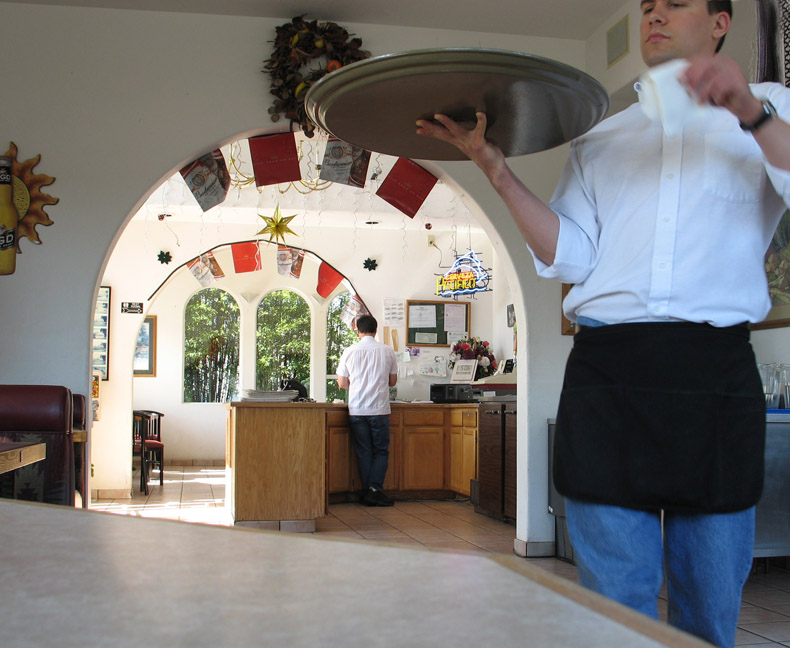
A server at an American restaurant

Tipping is a practiced social custom in the United States. Tipping by definition is voluntary – at the discretion of the customer. In restaurants offering traditional table service, a gratuity of 15–20% of the amount of a customer's check (before tax) is customary when good to excellent service is provided. In buffet-style restaurants where the server brings only beverages, 10–15% is customary. Higher tips may be given for excellent service, and lower tips for mediocre or subpar service. In the case of bad or rude service no tip may be given, and the restaurant manager may be notified of the issue at hand. Tips are also generally given for services provided at golf courses, casinos, hotels, spas, salons, and for concierge services, food delivery, and taxis. This etiquette applies to service at weddings where the host should provide appropriate tips to workers at the end of an event; the amount may be negotiated in the contract.

The Fair Labor Standards Act defines tippable employees as individuals who customarily and regularly receive tips of $30 or more per month. Federal law permits employers pay tippable workers a "submimimum" wage of $2.13 per hour, as long as, when combined with money earned from tips, the worker's hourly pay is equal to or greater than the standard federal minimum wage of $7.25 per hour. Some states and territories, however, provide more generous provisions for tipped employees. For example, laws in Alaska, California, Minnesota, Montana, Nevada, Oregon, Washington, and Guam specify that employees must be paid the full minimum wage of that state/territory (equal to or higher than the federal minimum wage) without regard to tips.

However, a report in 2012 from the Department of Labor's Wage and Hours Division (WHD) revealed that 84% of the 9,000 restaurants they investigated were acting in violation of the subminimum wage system. In the end the WHD "recovered $56.8 million in back wages for nearly 82,000 workers and assessed $2.5 million in civil money penalties."

Before 2018, a tip pool could not be allocated to employers, or to employees who do not customarily and regularly receive tips. These non-eligible employees included dishwashers, cooks, chefs, and janitors. In March 2018 an amendment was added to the Fair Labor Standards Act (FLSA) that allowed restaurants in a majority of states to split the split tips between front and back of house workers. Before this legislation passed there was concern of income inequality and the ability to pay rents between front and back of house workers. Over the span of 30 years since 1985 back of house workers in New York City restaurants had a compensation increase of about 25%. Meanwhile, their front of house counterpoints saw an increase of 300% in compensation. In 2015 the average wage of cooking staff in New York was $10–12, many of whom dealt with high monthly rent payments and also debt from culinary school. As seemingly low skilled front of house workers were making more money than the skilled back of house chefs, many cooks decided to switch over into serving instead.

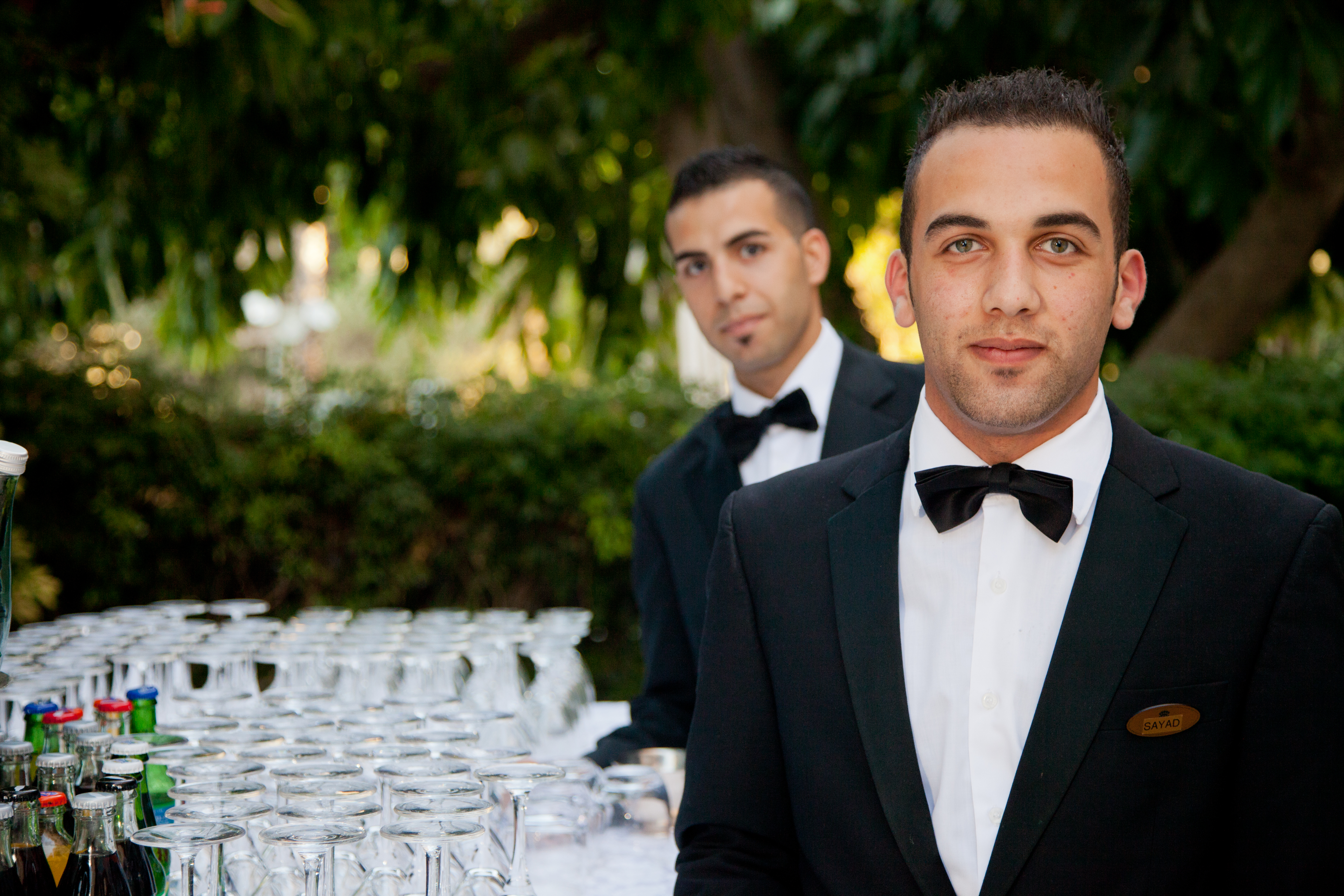
Waiters at the King David Hotel

There is only limited information available on levels of tipping. A study at Iowa State University provided data for a suburban restaurant surveyed in the early 1990s. The mean tip was $3.00 on a mean bill of $19.78. As such, the mean tip rate was 16.1%, and the median tip rate was about 15%. In a 2003 research study at Brigham Young University, the sample restaurants had an average tip percentage ranging from 13.57% to 14.69% between 1999 and 2002. A 2001 study done at Cornell University exploring the relationship between tip amount and quality of service has shown that quality of service is only weakly related to the amount the server is tipped by the guest. This study suggests that servers who provide amazing service are tipped marginally better, or not better at all, than servers who provide standard service.

Beginning in late 2022, concurrent with a global inflation surge, Americans have started to openly debate the nature of tipping. This is in part because many fast service restaurants have started adding a "tip screen" to the credit card process, asking a customer to tip before any service is actually provided or where the service provided is the minimum required to provide the goods purchased with no other interaction or service. The phenomenon, known as tipflation, has caused lower gratuities to be added by customers.

==== Service charges ====
Service charges are mandatory payments, typically added by caterers and banqueters. A service charge is not to be confused with a tip or gratuity which is optional and at the discretion of the customer. Restaurants commonly add it to checks for large parties. Some bars have decided to include service charge as well, for example in Manhattan, New York. Disclosure of service charge is required by law in some places, such as in State of Florida A standard predetermined percent, often ~18%, is sometimes labeled as a "service charge".

==== Taxation ====
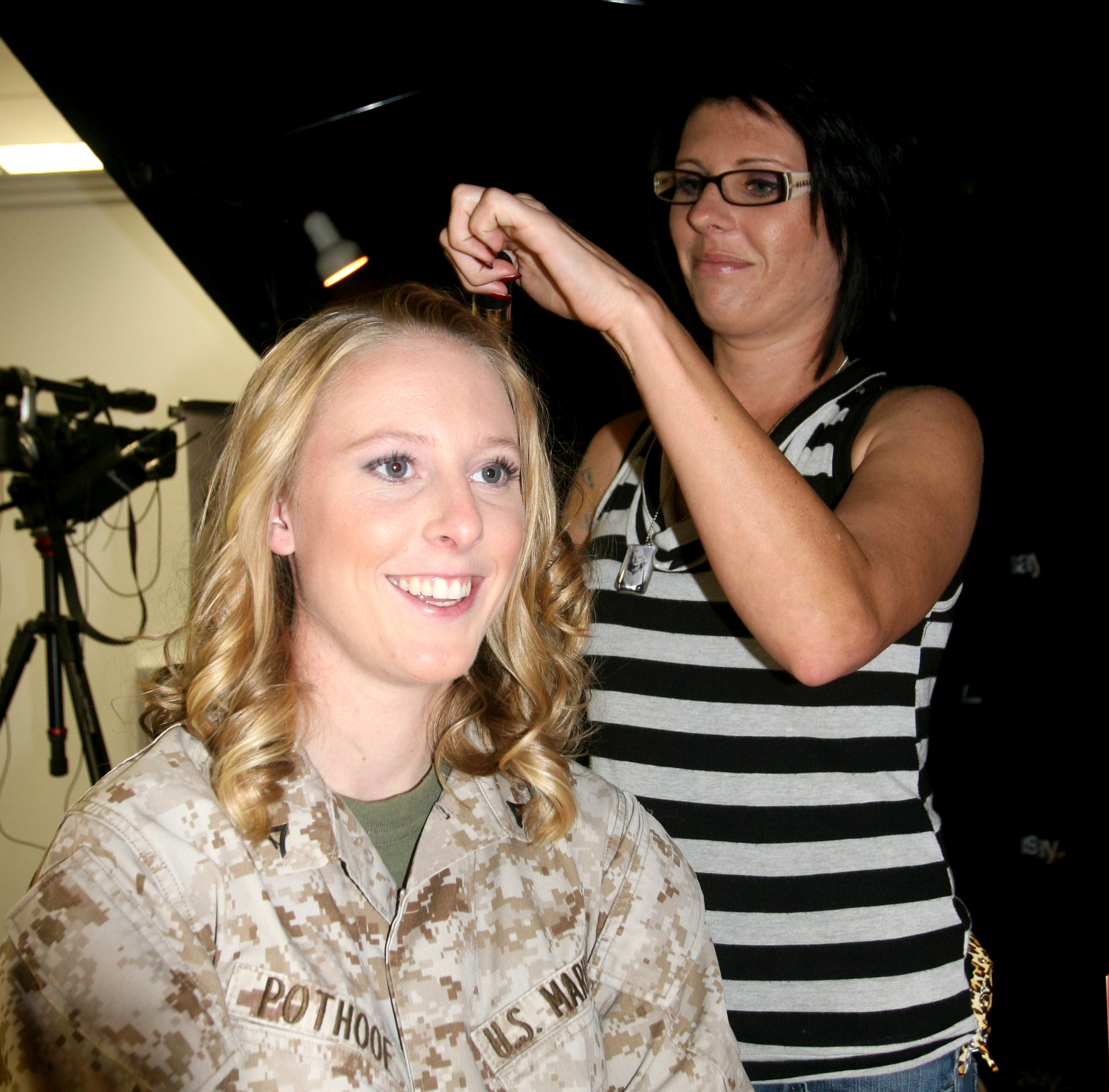
Hair stylists are among the service workers who are often tipped for their service in the United States.

Tips are considered income. The entire tip amount is treated as earned wages with the exception of months in which tip income was under $20. Unlike wages where payroll tax (Social Security and Medicare tax) are split between employee and employer, the employee pays 100% of payroll tax on tip income and tips are excluded from worker's compensation premiums in most states. This discourages no-tip policies because employers would pay 7.65% additional payroll taxes and up to 9% worker's compensation premiums on higher wages in lieu of tips.

Research finds that consistent tax evasion by waitstaff due to fraudulent declaration is a concern in the US. According to the IRS, between 40% and 50% of tips to waiters are not reported for taxation. Employers are responsible for Federal Unemployment Insurance premiums on tips paid directly from customers to employees, and this encourages employers to collaborate in under reporting tips.

==== Employee taxation responsibilities ====
The IRS states that employees making income from tips have three main responsibilities.

1. Keep a daily tip record.
2. Report tips to the employer, unless less than $20.
3. Report all tips on an individual income tax return.

Tips should be reported to employers by the 10th of the month after the tips were received unless the 10th ends up landing on a weekend day or a legal holiday. In that case the tips should be reported on the next available day that is not a weekend or a legal holiday. If the employee does not report the tips earned to their employer the employer will not be liable for the employer share of social security and Medicare taxes on the unreported tips. Employers will also not be liable for withholding and paying the employee's share of social security and Medicare taxes.

==== Employer taxation responsibilities ====
Employers that hire employees that make tips for their income have five main responsibilities with the IRS.

1. Retain employee tip reports.
2. Withhold employee income taxes.
3. Withhold employee share of social security and Medicare taxes.
4. Report this information to the IRS.
5. Pay the employer share of social security and Medicare taxes based on the reported tip income.

Employers should distinguish between service charges and tipped income and file and report the two separately. An employer operating a large food or beverage establishment will need to file a specific Form 8027 for each establishment they operate. A business that is recognized as a large food or beverage establishment must fall into all four categories shown below:

1. The food or beverage operation must be based in one of the 50 states in the United States or the District of Columbia.
2. Food and beverage is served for consumption on the premises. This does not include fast food operations.
3. Customers tipping employees at the food or beverage operation must be a common practice.
4. In the last year the operation employed over 10 employees on a typical business day regularly.

==== US federal employees ====
The US government recognizes tips as allowable expenses for federal employee travel. However, US law prohibits federal employees from receiving tips under Standards of Ethical Conduct. Asking for, accepting or agreeing to take anything of value that influences the performance of an official act is not allowed. A 2011 rule issued by the US Department of Labor which prohibited employers from tip pooling employees who were paid at least the federal minimum wage and who do not "customarily and regularly" receive tips was repealed in 2018. Instead, workers will have more rights to sue their employers for stolen tips, with assistance from the US Department of Labor.

==== Ride sharing ====
In the past ride sharing companies in the US were against the implementation of a tipping system. Uber wanted to prioritize quick transactions through their app and believed a tipping system would lead to an inconvenient experience for users. In 2017 Uber started its "180 days of change" to improve relations with its drivers. Part of the PR campaign included adding a tipping option to the app. The data shows that given the option to tip, close to 60% of Uber users never tip their drivers and only 1% will consistently tip their drivers. Only 16% of rides will result in the driver being tipped and the average tip amount in 2019 was $3.11.

==== Discrimination ====
A study from 2005 showed that average tips varied depending on the race of New Haven cab drivers. The average tip for white cab drivers was 20.3%, while black cab drivers received 12.6%, and cab drivers of other races received 12.4%. Both the study with cab drivers and another study about a southern restaurant showed that both white and black customers tipped black workers less on average than their white counterparts.

== South America ==
=== Bolivia ===
Service charges are included with the bill. A tip of around 5% or so is sometimes given, and is considered polite.

=== Brazil ===
The term "caixinha" (literally "little box") refers to a gratuity left at juice shops or similar establishments where full meals are not served. This gratuity is typically small and can be just the coins from the change, which are dropped into a decorated box beside the cashier. Additionally, tipping practices in Brazil vary across different service industries. While taxi drivers generally do not expect tips, delivery services may include a charge for convenience, leading to a decrease in tipping frequency. In other instances, tips ranging from 1 to 5 Brazilian reals, or more in luxury establishments, may be given to service providers such as parking attendants, luggage carriers, or gas station attendants who perform additional tasks beyond their primary duties.

=== Paraguay ===
Service charges are included with the bill and tipping is uncommon.

== Oceania ==
=== Australia ===
Tipping is not expected or required in Australia. The minimum wage in Australia is reviewed yearly, and as of 2025, it was set at A$24.95 per hour (A$31.18 for casual employees) and this is fairly standard across all types of venues. Tipping at cafés and restaurants (especially for a large party), and tipping of taxi drivers and home food deliverers is again, not required or expected. However many people tend to round up the amount owed while indicating that they are happy to let the worker "keep the change". Smaller cafes and similar places could have tip jars which people might put a bit of small change into but again, it certainly isn't a requirement.

There is no tradition of tipping somebody who is just providing a service (e.g. a hotel porter). Casinos in Australia—and some other places—generally prohibit tipping of gaming staff, as it is considered bribery. For example, in the state of Tasmania, the Gaming Control Act 1993 states in section 56 (4): "It is a condition of every special employee's licence that the special employee must not solicit or accept any gratuity, consideration or other benefit from a patron in a gaming area". There is concern that tipping might become more common in Australia.

=== New Zealand ===
Tipping is not a traditional practice in New Zealand, though has become more common in recent years, especially in finer establishments. Tipping in New Zealand is likely the result of tourists visiting from tipping cultures (such as the United States) who may follow their own tipping customs. It is still extremely rare among locals, especially among the working and middle-class. The minimum wage in New Zealand is reviewed yearly, and as of April 2024 was set at NZ$23.15 per hour for employees 18 and over.

Where tipping does occur among New Zealanders it is usually to reward a level of service that is far in excess of the customer's expectations, or as an unsolicited reward for a voluntary act of service. A number of websites published by the New Zealand government advise tourists that "tipping in New Zealand is not obligatory – even in restaurants and bars. However, tipping for good service or kindness is at the discretion of the visitor". A Sunday Star-Times reader poll in 2011 indicated 90% of their readers did not want tipping for good service to become the norm in New Zealand.
