= Tip Project =

Business venture and organization

Tip Promotion Association
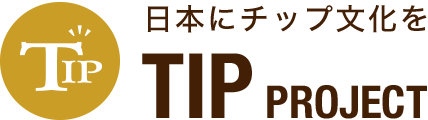
- Industry: Hospitality
- Founded: 2021
- Founder: Yoshihito Kamogashira
- Defunct: 2023
- Website: tip-culture.com (archived)

Tip Project was a business venture and organization which unsuccessfully pushed to introduce American practices of gratuity into Japanese culture. First launched in 2021 and managed by the Tip Promotion Association, it was shut down in the first half of 2023.

== Background ==
Japan was previously noted as a culture where gratuity practices largely did not exist. Numerous travel agencies, blogs, and companies have written about how in Japan, tipping is considered either something that should not be practiced, or in some cases, considered to be rude. In restaurants and food service, where American tipping is most prevalent, Japanese culture treats good service as something to be expected by default and not rewarded. Cultural customs also traditionally give Japanese food service workers at least one free meal per worked day. The only Japanese workers who traditionally receive gratuities are highly-personal staff, such as geishas and workers in ryokan hotels, though these workers frequently receive their gratuity similar to Chinese red envelopes rather than standalone cash.

Tip Project came at about the same time as Japanese taxi drivers giving the ability for riders to add gratuity. The effort was started by Japanese taxi operator Sanwa Kotsu in collaboration with the Respo company, a digital tipping firm; Sanwa Kotsu has previously recorded instances of the company's drivers receiving tips. Prior to Tip Project and the taxi driver tipping system, the only gratuity forms in Japan to gain traction was in a form of origami tips, where service workers were handed custom origami sculptures made from chopstick wrappers as gratuity.

== Project history ==
=== Beginnings ===
The project was founded in early 2021 by Yoshihito Kamogashira, a Japanese YouTuber. Kamogashira started the project because he believed that American tipping practices would help raise the self-esteem and happiness of Japanese service industry workers who were severely affected by the COVID-19 pandemic. The project also believes that the creation of the system will enable businesses to succeed not solely on the number of customers it receives.

=== Business model and promotion ===
Tip Project's primary source of revenue came from selling branded paper slips and supplementary goods, with the slips known as "tip tickets". These tip tickets read "premium Japan tip", which featured the tipper's name, the recipient server or worker's name, as well as an amount to be tipped in yen. The project noted that at least ten restaurants signed onto the idea.

One of the ways Tip Project promoted its practices was by producing and marketing a video in which the project's recommended usage of its tip tickets is used. In the video, set in a restaurant, a waiter offers a guest a blanket, though instead of vocally expressing her gratitude, decides to fill out a tip ticket.

== Reception ==
=== Pre-failure ===
The backlash against the project was immediate. Translations of Japanese comments in a Kotaku article that covered the project read "This doesn't suit Japan" and "This is a pain in the ass". One comment suggested that if 20% was the standard tip, discount all prices by 20%.

=== Dissolution ===
Tip Project vanished in 2023. The Financial Times celebrated the failure of Tip Project, with columnist Leo Lewis writing that the project's failure was a rare time when people should "relish the failure of a business venture". Lewis proceeds to describe the failure of Tip Project as Japan's culture being spared from a social "tyranny", in comparison to the overly-high gratuity amounts given in American culture. Lewis draws the ultimate conclusion that tipping is a fundamentally "un-Japanese" practice.
