= Valet boy =

Type of scammer

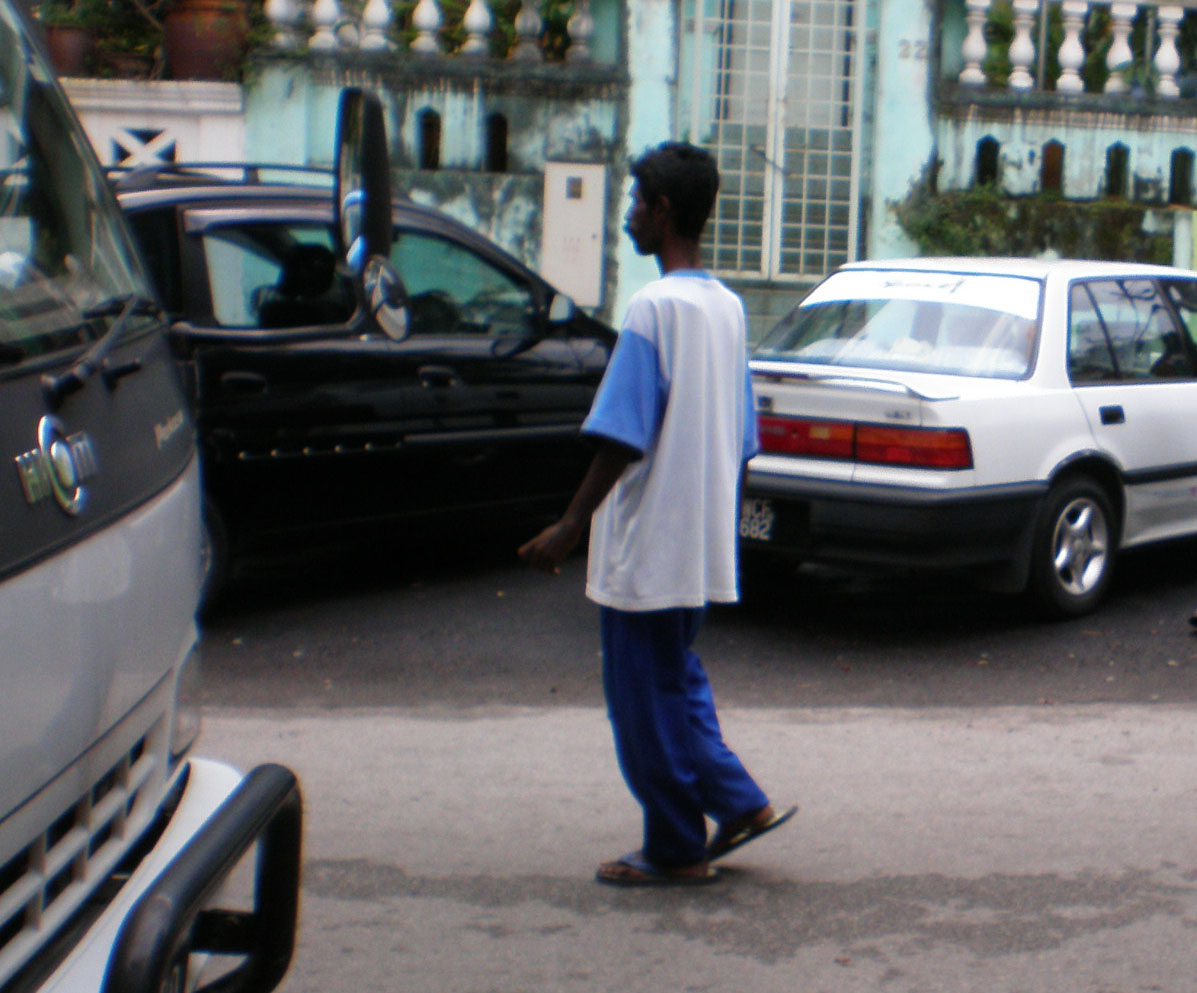
A valet boy at Puduraya district, Kuala Lumpur

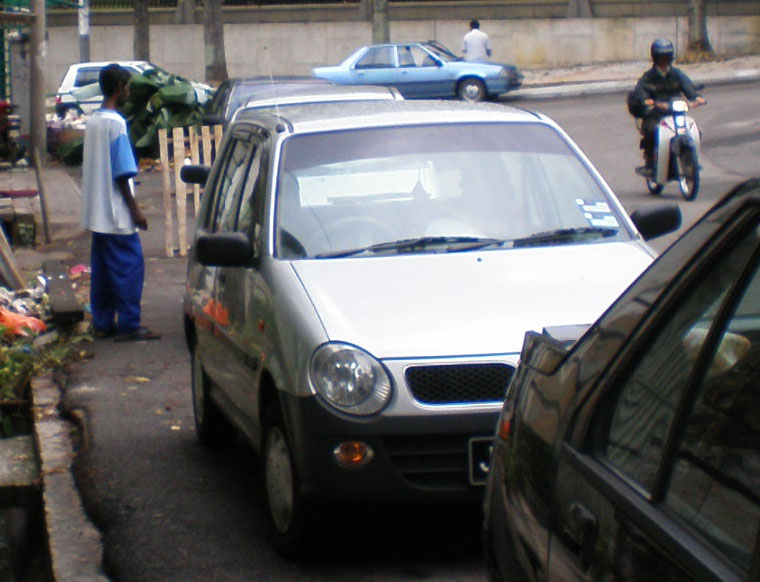
A valet boy at Puduraya district, Kuala Lumpur

Valet boy (Malay: Jaga kereta) is a term used in some countries to refer to young people who ask for fees from those who park at the roadside. Valet boys usually work in groups, and demand an RM 1-5 "parking fee" from car owners, under an agreement that they will protect the car. If the driver refuses to pay, the valet boys will vandalise the vehicle. This "protection" service is thus a form of extortion. The valet boys do not park the cars for the owners, but direct the owners into parking lots.

== See also ==
- Valet
- Valet de chambre
- Trapito
- Car guard
- Franelero
