= Valet parking =

Type of parking service

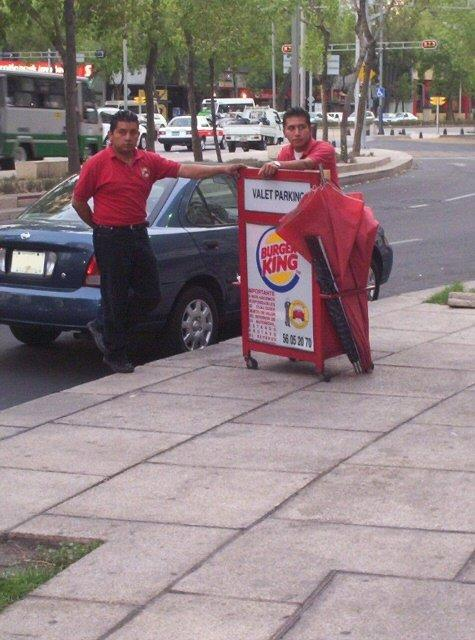
Valet parking offered at a Burger King restaurant in Mexico City

Valet parking is a parking service offered by some restaurants, stores, and other businesses. In contrast to "self-parking", where customers find a parking space on their own, customers' vehicles are parked for them by a person called a valet. This service either requires a fee to be paid by the customer or is offered free of charge by the establishment.

== Explanation ==
A valet is usually an employee of the establishment or an employee of a third-party valet service. When there is a fee, it is usually either a flat amount or a fee based on how long the car is parked. It is customary in the United States to tip the valet who actually parks the car. Valet parking is most often offered (and is most useful) in urban areas, where parking is scarce, though some upscale businesses offer valet parking as an optional service, even though self-parking may be readily available. For example, in wealthy suburban areas like California's Silicon Valley, some hospitals (like Stanford University Medical Center) offer valet parking for the convenience of patients and their visitors.

Some cars come with an additional key, known as a valet key, that starts the ignition and opens the driver's side door, but prevents the valet from gaining access to valuables that are located in the trunk or the glove box.

== Venues ==
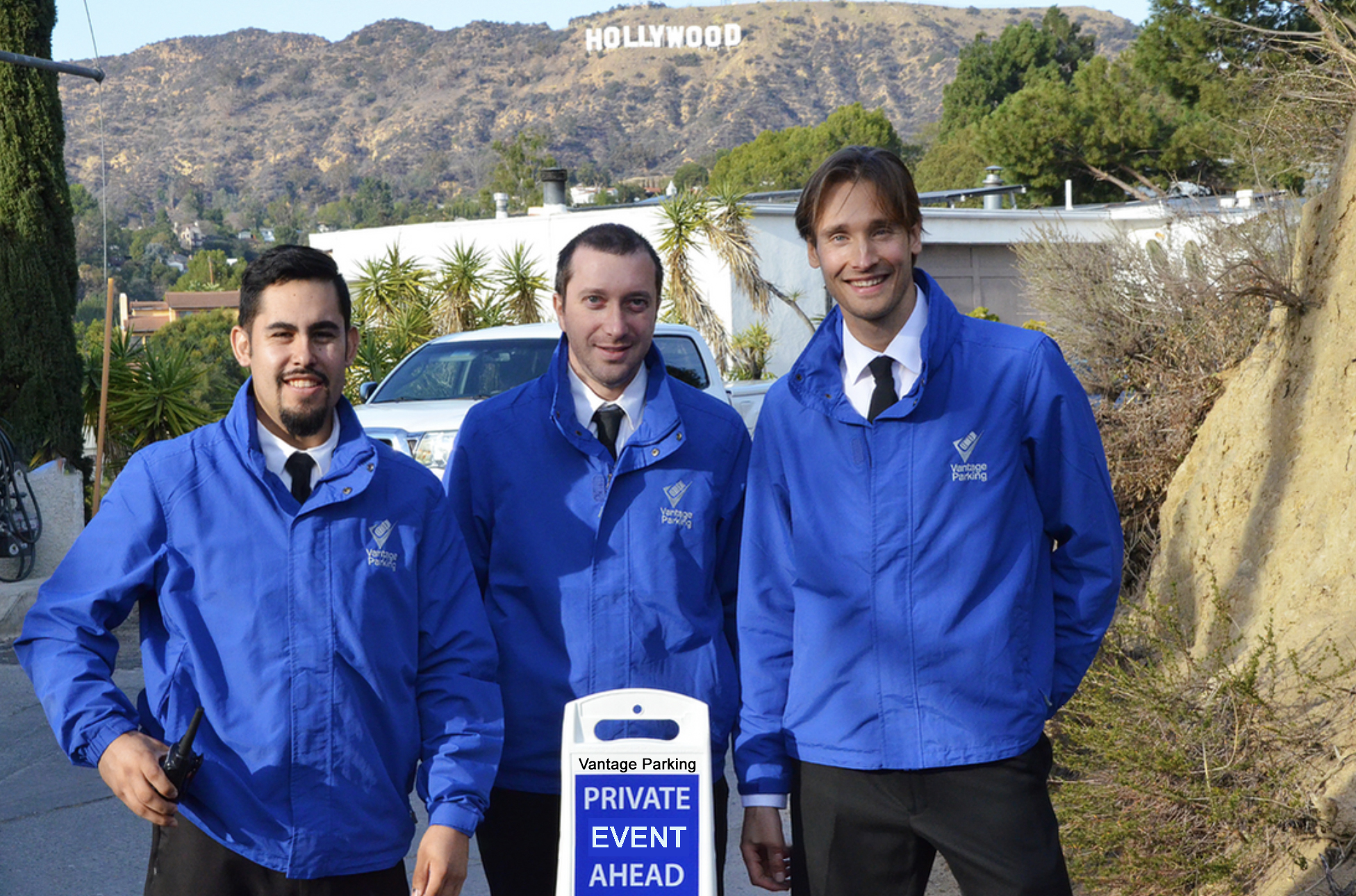
Valet parking in Hollywood, Los Angeles

Several different types of venues offer valet parking. These include:

- Single event: These valets are usually hired for just the evening and have assigned roles for efficiency. Parking may be at an off-site location that can handle many cars and can range from a dirt field to a multi-story parking lot. It might also be in the streets near the pickup location. At a wedding the cars may be stacked in order, respecting the hierarchy of importance of the visitors. For instance, at a Middle Eastern oil company executive party, the vehicles might be stacked in the order of the importance of the executives of the company.
- Restaurant or bar location: In this setting, parking is usually in the establishment's own lot, but may also be a blocked-off section of a nearby parking house or multilayer lot. Often a dozen spots in front will be reserved for the big spenders or frequent visitors.
- Bar or crowded urban setting: Here, space is a premium, yet the cars on the street may have a huge bearing on the clientele inside.
- Hotel location: Hotels can have all types mentioned above. Lots, multi-layer lots, parking houses, hydraulic structures, parking in front, parking in back, shuttles for car owners, shuttles for valets and more. The biggest difference between hotels and other types is the cost.
- Airports: In the United Kingdom, companies have offered valet parking at airports. The service is also offered when parking at an airport hotel.
- Casinos: Casinos in the U.S., particularly those in Las Vegas, Atlantic City, Niagara Falls and most larger Native American casinos provide either free or low-cost valet parking.
- Hospitals
- Malls: Major shopping centers with high traffic volume often results in full parking facilities. Some malls offer valets (with fees) to park the vehicle at a temporary location or a reserved lot. Keys are given to the valet and a ticket is issued to the driver. Upon the return of patron, the valet will drive the vehicle back to the valet booth. Temporary mall parking valets may be found during major holiday periods, like Christmas.

== Valet parking equipment ==
Common valet parking equipment includes articles such as valet podiums and key boxes for storing and protecting keys and valet tickets which are used to keep track of keys and their corresponding vehicles. Some valet parking providers also use specially designed umbrellas and signs to direct customers or display prices.

== Bike valet ==
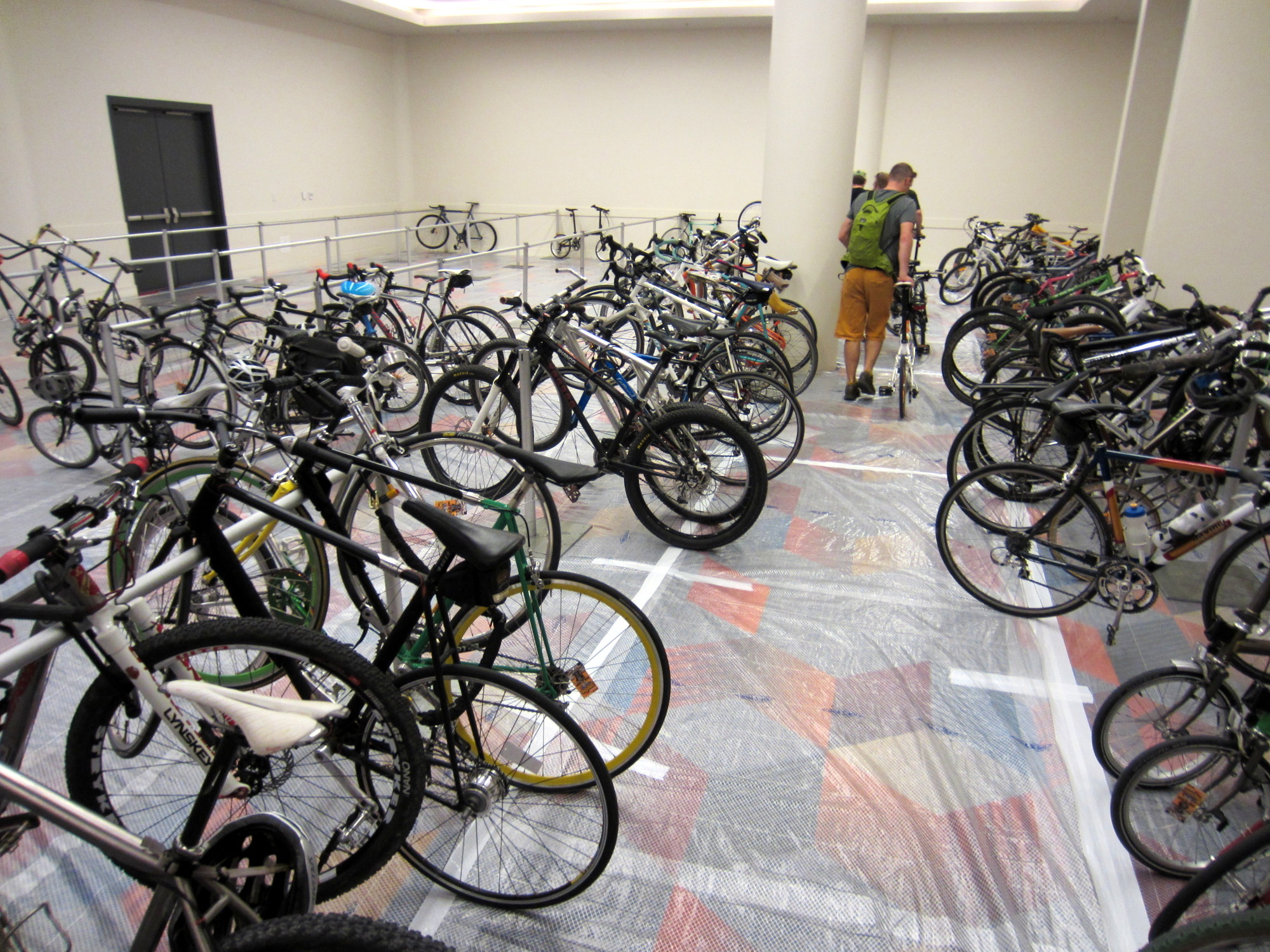
Valet parking in Las Vegas

In some urban areas where parking is exceptionally scarce, events and universities sometimes sponsor a valet parking service for bikes. This service is normally free of charge and offered to encourage riding a bike to the location.

== See also ==
- Valet boy
- Valet
